= Claude Chauchetière =

French Jesuit missionary and painter

- Born: September 7, 1645; Poitiers, Saint-Porchaire, France.
- Died: April 17, 1709 (aged 63)
- Occupations: Jesuit priest; missionary; biographer; painter
- Known for: Biography of Kateri Tekakwitha

Claude Chauchetière (September 7, 1645 - April 17, 1709) was a French Jesuit missionary, priest, biographer, and painter. Claude Chauchetière is well known for his published work Annual Narrative of the Mission of the Sault from Its Foundation Until the Year 1686 which detailed his time in New France as a Jesuit missionary. For most of his mission work he was placed in the village of Kahnawake where he encountered Kateri Tekakwitha, an Algonquin-Mohawk Jesuit convert, an encounter that immensely impacted his spiritual life. Later on Chauchetière would also actively work to get Kateri Tekakwitha canonized as a saint.

== Early life and education ==
Claude Chauchetière was born on September 7, 1645, in Poitiers, Saint-Porchaire, France. Chauchetière grew up in a moderately wealthy family. His father, Jehan Chauchetière, was an attorney and worked for the highest court in the region. Claude Chauchetiere's childhood was filled with losing the people he loved at a young age. His mother died when he was only nine years old and at age sixteen he lost his father. He had a good relationship with his father and he did not take his death well. Chauchetière had an older brother named Jean and a younger brother named Jacques. Despite the death of their parents the three brothers maintained close relationship with each other. Chauchetière and his brothers were all members of the Society of Jesus and served at different mission posts.

For their elementary school years, Chauchetière and his brothers attended a small parish school in their hometown of Poitiers. After receiving basic instruction in reading and writing in French at the parish school, Chauchetière enrolled at the nearby Jesuit college at the age of thirteen. After his graduation from the Jesuit college, Chauchetière joined the Society of Jesus as a novice. He studied at the Jesuit novitiate in Bordeaux in 1663. Chauchetière excelled academically at the Jesuit novitiate and grew spiritually. While he was a Jesuit trainee Chauchetière also worked as a teacher at a junior level.

== Kahnawake mission work ==
Claude Chauchetière chose to do his missionary work in Canada known as New France at the time, because he wanted to imitate the suffering and passion of Christ. To prepare for his mission post, Chauchetière studied the Huron language with the help of Reverend Father Mercier. When he first arrived to Canada, Chauchetière was appointed to the mission for the Hurons. After a year of working with the Hurons, he was appointed to work in Kahnawake. Chauchetière was a gifted painter and would draw biblical illustrations and paintings in his evangelization work with the natives. These illustrations were put together into small storybooks that the Indians could carry with them everywhere.

Chauchetière first arrived in Kahnawake, also known as Sault St. Louis, in the summer of 1677. When he first arrived there he was under the supervision of Jacques Frémin, a veteran missionary. After Jacques Frémin went back to France due to his failing health, Chauchetière was left alone with only one colleague, Pierre Cholenec, who would later serve an important role in helping him with getting Kateri Tekakwitha canonized.

His duty as a missionary in Kahnawake included celebrating mass, taking confession, visiting the sick, instructing newcomers, tending to the dying and dead, supervising work on the farm, and writing reports. Many of the converts of Kahnawake were very devoted and would practice self-mortification as evidence of their faith. Some took it so far that Chauchetière had to advise against excessive self-flagellation. The only constant problem that Chauchetière and his colleagues faced was the ill influence of liquor on the Indians. Despite having converted the Indians were seen drinking and still practicing their old ways. Chauchetière would go on to record about his mission work in his published work Annual Narrative of the Mission of the Sault from Its Foundation Until the Year 1686.

== Encounter with Kateri Tekakwitha ==
Claude Chauchetière's first encounter with Kateri Tekakwitha occurred in the spring of 1680. Tekakwitha was then 24 years old and Chauchetière was 34 years old. When Chauchetière met Kateri Tekakwitha for the first time she was in failing health and bedridden. Chauchetière regularly visited Tekakwitha's longhouse. Claude Chauchetière was performing his duty as a Jesuit priest to tend to the sick but he felt drawn to Tekakwitha and sensed that there was something special and saintly about her. Tekakwitha died on April 17, 1680, and Chauchetière got to witness her death. Chauchetière's strong interest in Tekakwitha was not unfounded. Tekakwitha was a devoted follower of the Catholic faith and often practiced self-mortification as prove of her faith despite being plagued with health complications. She was noted for being the most fervent disciple and was respected by her fellow natives.

Before his encounter with Tekakwitha Chauchetière was feeling dejected because the realities of life as a missionary in New France was very different from his idealistic views. However, after he met the fervent Kateri he became inspired. He was inspired by Kateri's devotion and childlike faith. He even began to view Kateri as his spiritual superior. Chauchetière's encounter with Kateri served as pivotal moment for his religious experiences. He would go on to write a biography of Kateri Tekakwitha as well as his encounter with her.

== After Kahnawake ==
Chauchetière left Kahnawake after seventeen years of living there as a Jesuit missionary. After his departure from Kahnawake, Chauchetière went to teach at the Jesuit College of Montreal in 1695. At the Jesuit college of Montreal Chauchetière taught mathematics to French-Canadian boys and military officers while also performing his priestly duties. He remained at the Jesuit college of Montreal for fourteen years and then he was transferred to the college at Quebec, the head Jesuit establishment in New France. Since 1692, Chauchetière had been suffering from many health complications. On April 17, 1709, Chauchetière died at the Jesuit college at Quebec at the age of sixty-three.

== Kateri Tekakwitha's canonization ==
After the death of Kateri Tekakwitha in 1680, Chauchetière became convinced that Tekakwitha was a saint when he received visits from Tekakwitha's apparition. Chauchetière and his colleague Pierre Cholenec played a major role in Kateri Tekakwitha's canonization through their detailed records of Tekakwitha's life. Chauchetière spent about fifteen years of his life trying to get Tekakwitha canonized because he believed it was his life's purpose. Chauchetière was the first person to write a biography of Kateri Tekakwitha. In his biography, Chauchetière wrote about her exemplary Christian virtues, penance, purity, her performing miracles, and her reputation for holiness. Canonizations were uncommon in the seventeenth and eighteenth centuries so his effort for Tekakwitha's canonization was taken lightly. However, on October 21, 2012, Kateri Tekakwitha was finally canonized by Pope Benedict XVI, thus becoming the first Native American saint.
