= National Shrine of the North American Martyrs =

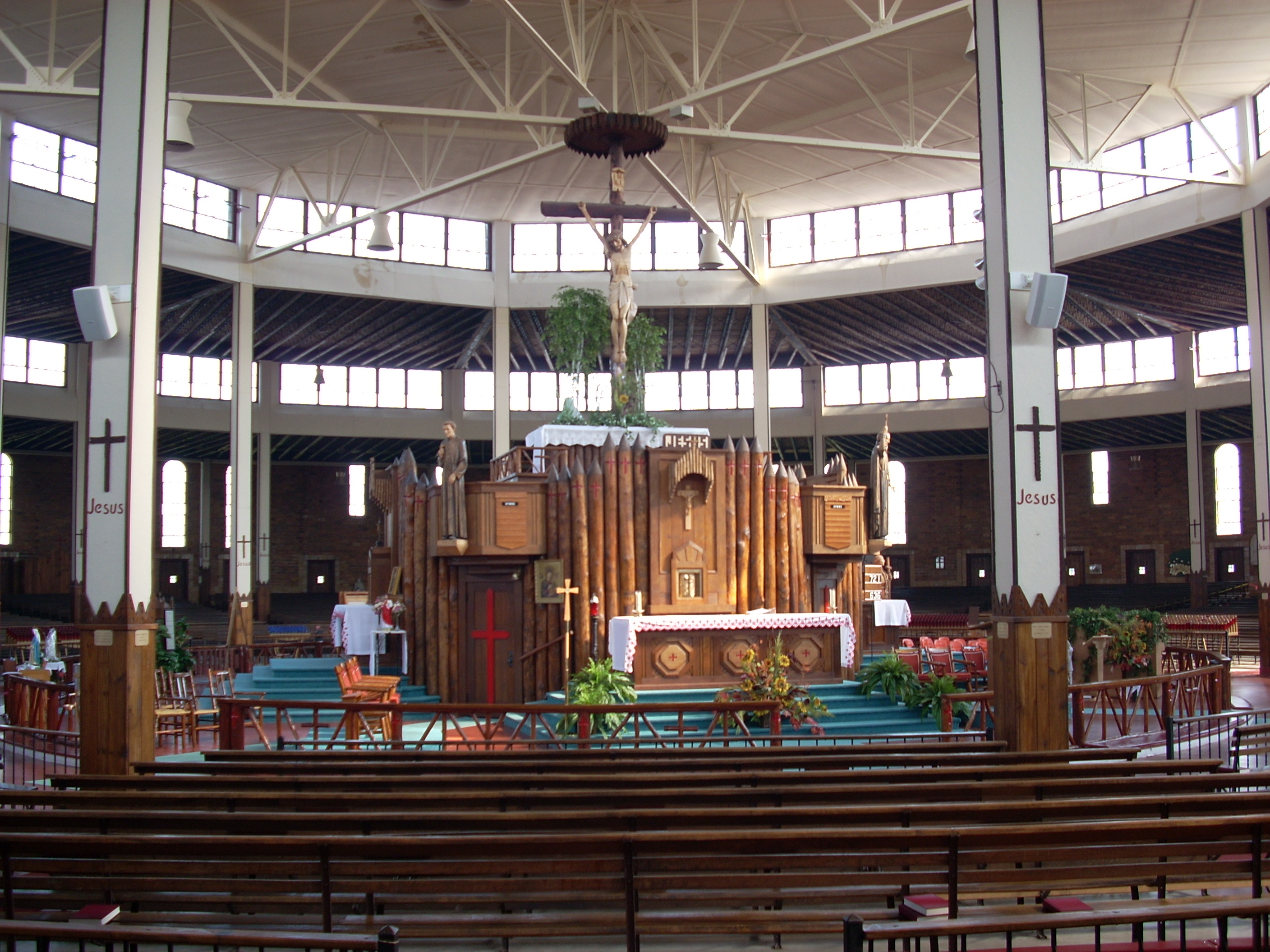
- Interior of the Coliseum at the National Shrine of the North American Martyrs, Auriesville, New York, showing the sanctuary and high altar.
- National Shrine of the North American Martyrs
- Address: 136 Shrine Road, Fultonville, New York 12072
- Country: United States
- Denomination: Catholic
- Website: www.ourladyofmartyrsshrine.org

History
- Status: national shrine
- Founded: 1884
- Founder(s): Rev. Joseph Loyzance, S.J.
- Dedication: North American Martyrs and St. Kateri Tekakwitha

The National Shrine of the North American Martyrs, also known as the Shrine of Our Lady of Martyrs, is a Roman Catholic shrine in Auriesville, New York dedicated to the three Jesuit missionaries who were martyred at the Mohawk Indian village of Ossernenon in 1642 and 1646.

While it is physically located within the Roman Catholic Diocese of Albany, it is owned and operated independently by the Friends of Our Lady of Martyrs Shrine, Inc. The original church was built in 1884. For over 130 years the Jesuits owned and directed the shrine. On March 22, 2017, the Jesuits transferred the deed of the main campus to the Friends.

== History ==
In 1642, a small band of Jesuit missionaries set out from Sainte-Marie among the Hurons, a settlement in Ontario, Canada, to work among the Wendat (Huron) of upstate New York and the territories in Canada. They were captured en route by a party of Mohawks, a tribe of the Haudenosaunee (Iroquois) Confederacy, and enemy of the Wendat. Rene Goupil, a surgeon and later Jesuit lay brother, and Father Isaac Jogues were brought to the Mohawk settlement of Ossernenon. Caught teaching a child the sign of the cross, Goupil was felled with a blow from a hatchet and died. He was the first of the Jesuit order in the Canadian missions to suffer martyrdom. Jogues remained a captive for thirteen months before Dutch traders and minister Johannes Megapolensis from Fort Orange (present-day Albany) paid a ransom and gained his freedom from the Mohawk; they arranged for his transportation by boat to New Amsterdam (present-day New York City), from where he returned to France.

Jogues returned to New France (present-day Canada) in the spring of 1644. He gave the name of "Lake of the Blessed Sacrament" to the body of water called by the Indians as Horicon, now known as Lake George. In 1646, accompanied by a lay missionary John LaLande, Jogues was sent to negotiate peace with the Haudenosaunee. In late September he began his third and last journey to the Mohawk. In the interim sickness had broken out in the tribe and a blight had fallen on the crops. This double calamity was ascribed to Jogues, whom the Indians always regarded as a sorcerer. The news of this change of sentiment spread rapidly, and though fully aware of the danger, Jogues continued on his way to Ossernenon. All his companions except Lalande fled. The Mohawk captured him near Lake George, beat him and led him to the village. On 18 October 1646 when entering a cabin, Jogues was struck with a tomahawk axe and killed. LaLande was killed the next day, while trying to recover Jogues' body. Together with Goupil, they are the only canonized Roman Catholic martyrs of the United States. (In 1970, the Russian Orthodox Church canonized two martyrs, St. Peter the Aleut and St. Juvenaly of Alaska.)

== Shrine ==
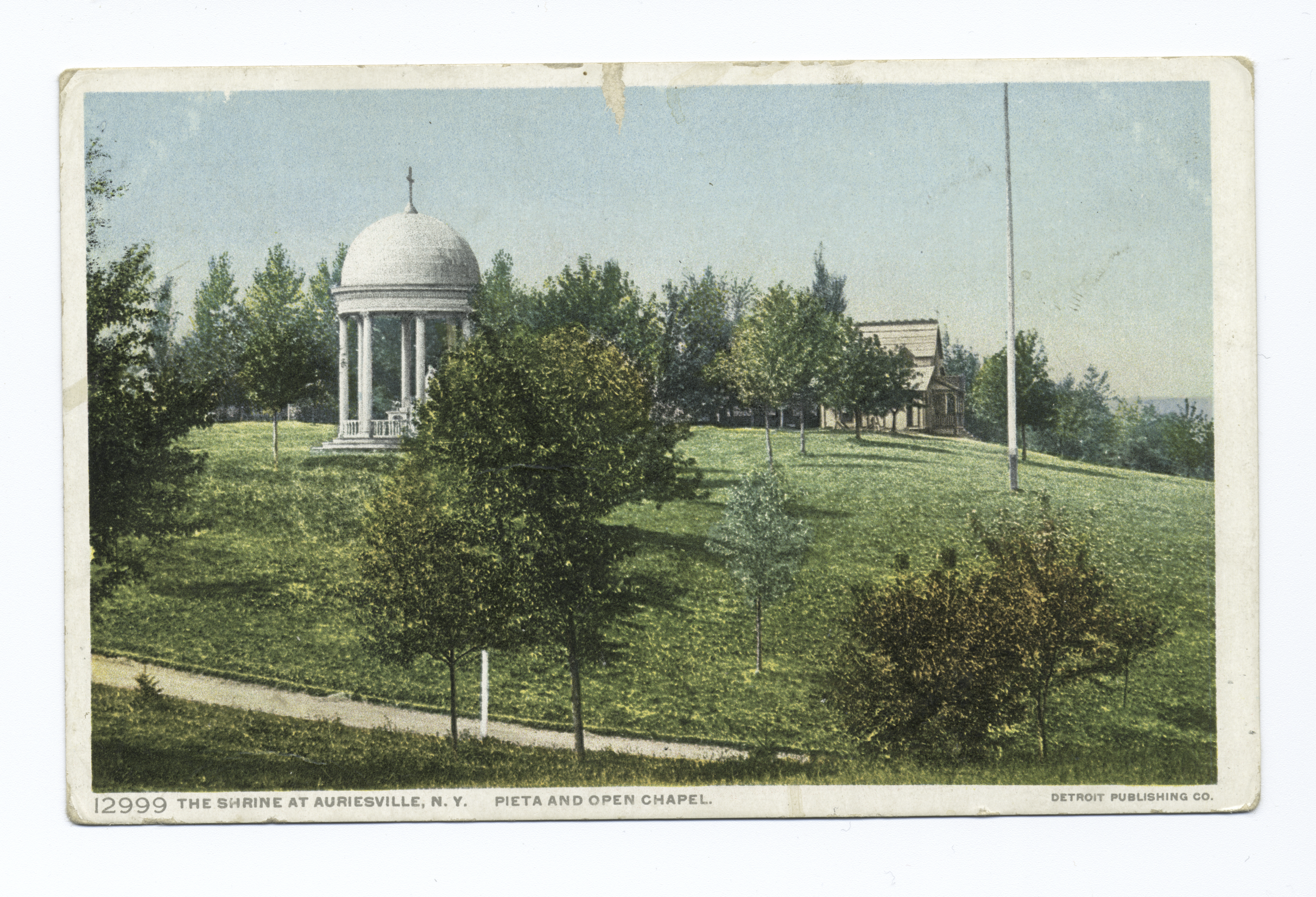

Auriesville is on the south bank of the Mohawk River, about 40 miles (64 km) west of Albany, New York. It is about 9 miles (14 km) miles east of what archeologists believe to be the site of Osserneonon, the Mohawk village where the three Jesuit missionaries were martyred. It was destroyed in the 17th century and the site was abandoned.

In the nineteenth century, research on the part of Catholic historian John Gilmary Shea and Gen. J. S. Clarke of Auburn, who had studied Indian sites both in New York and Huron territory, led to their believing they had identified the former site of Ossersnenon, where Father Jogues and his companions died. Rev. Joseph Loyzance, S.J., a parish priest of St. Joseph's, Troy, New York, had a lifelong interest in the lives of the early missionaries and supported honoring them at this site, which developed as Auriesville.

In 1884, Father Loyzance purchased 10 acres (4.0 ha) of land on the hill where the village had been located, and erected a small shrine under the title of Our Lady of Martyrs. Father Loyzance subsequently led a pilgrimage of 4,000 people from Albany and Troy to the shrine. Other parishes later adopted the practice of visiting Auriesville during the summer.

In 1930, a coliseum was built at the shrine, overlooking the Mohawk Valley, as one of the first circular churches built in the United States. The Coliseum's design allows for the seating of approximately 6000 worshipers for Holy Mass. Today the grounds of the Shrine cover some 600 acres (240 ha).

In the Shrine's Visitor Center is a chapel dedicated to Our Lady Undoer of Knots.

== See also ==
- Martyrs' Shrine (Midland, Ontario, Canada)
- North American Martyrs
- Top pilgrimage destinations in the United States
