= Kateri Tekakwitha =

Mohawk/Algonquin Catholic saint (1656–1680)

Saint Kateri Tekakwitha
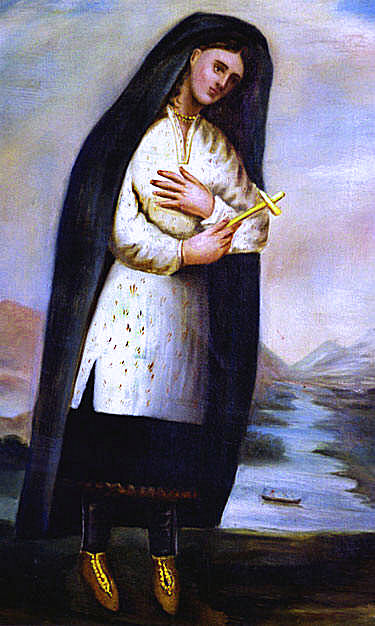
- Portrait of Catherine Tekawitha, c. 1690, by Father Chauchetière

Virgin
- Born: 1656; Ossernenon, Haudenosauneega (modern New York, United States)
- Baptized: 18 April 1676
- Died: 17 April 1680 (aged 24); Kahnawake (near Montreal), Canada, New France
- Venerated in: Catholic Church
- Beatified: 22 June 1980, Vatican City by Pope John Paul II
- Canonized: 21 October 2012, Vatican City by Pope Benedict XVI
- Feast: 17 April; 14 July (United States)
- Attributes: Lily; turtle, rosary, cross or crucifix
- Patronage: environment; ecology; people in exile; Native Americans; orphans; people ridiculed for their piety
- Controversy: Pressure to marry against will, shunned for her Catholic beliefs

Kateri Tekakwitha (Note: Mohawk pronunciation: [ˈɡaderi deɡaˈɡwita]) (1656 – April 17, 1680) was a Mohawk woman who converted to Catholicism. Committing to live as a virgin, she became known for her devotion to Jesus Christ, diligent work ethic, and dedicated prayers for her fellow Native people. She was canonized in 2012, becoming the first Native American saint. She is known as "the Lily of the Mohawks", "the Protectress of Canada", and "the Genevieve of New France".

Born in the Mohawk village of Ossernenon in present-day New York, she and her family contracted smallpox in an epidemic; she was the only one of the family to survive, but had scarring on her face. She was influenced by French Jesuit missionaries and converted to Catholicism at age 19, taking the baptismal name Catherine (or Kateri).

After taking a vow of perpetual virginity, she left her village, and moved to the Jesuit mission village of Kahnawake, just south of Montreal. There she died five years later, respected for her piety and good works.

She was beatified in 1980 by Pope John Paul II, and canonized by Pope Benedict XVI at Saint Peter's Basilica on 21 October 2012, along with six others: Jacques Berthieu, Pedro Calungsod, Giovanni Battista Piamarta, Maria of Mt Carmel Salles y Barangueras, Marianne of Molokaʻi, and Anna Schäffer.

== Early life and education ==
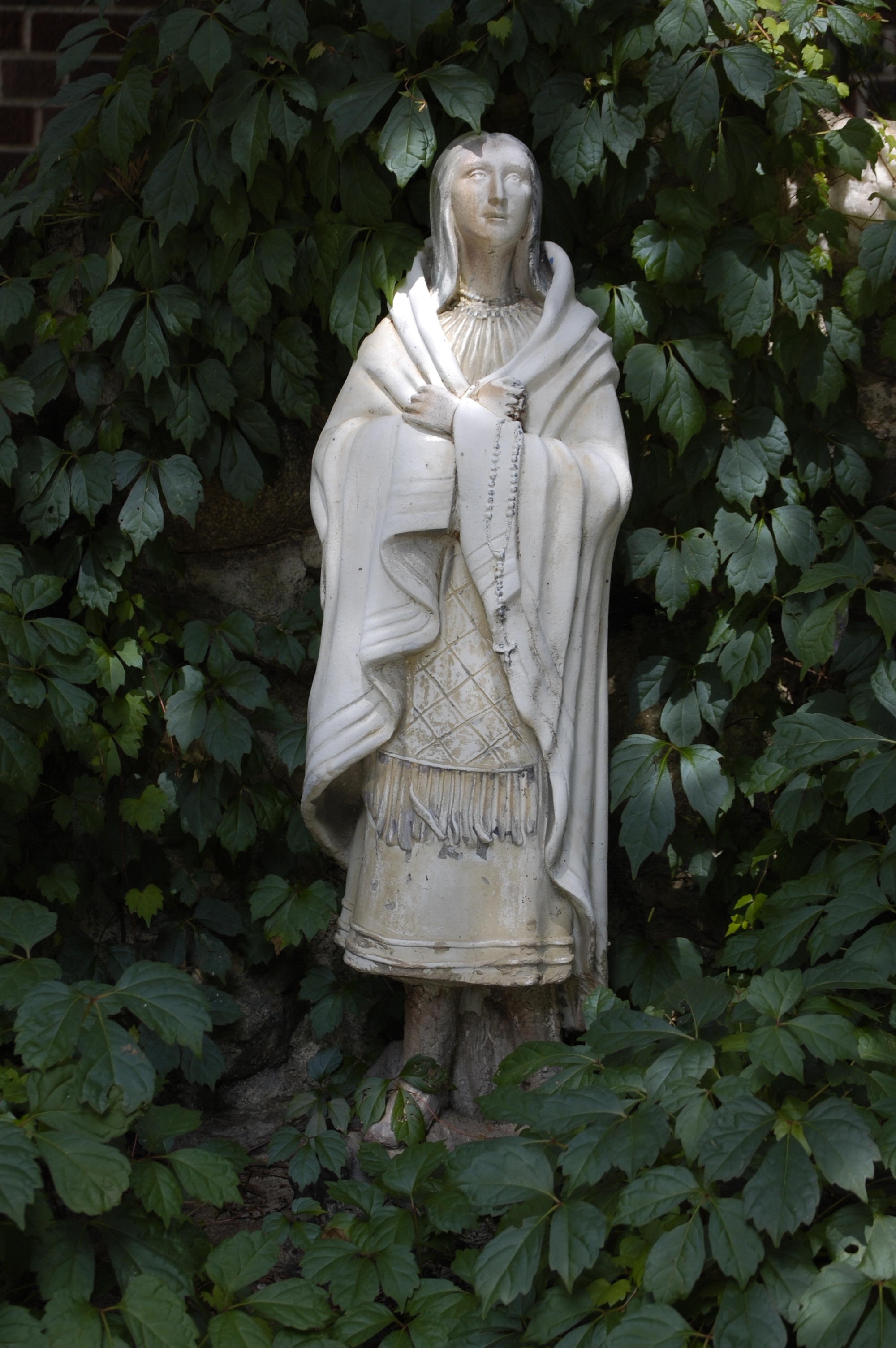
Sculpture of Saint Kateri Tekakwitha

She was born around 1656 in the Mohawk village of Ossernenon (Mohawk: Osserné:non) in what is now northeastern New York. Her given name was Tekakwitha or Tekaouïta, meaning "she who bumps into things" in the Mohawk language.

She was the daughter of Kenneronkwa, a Mohawk chief, and Kahenta, an Algonquin woman who had been captured in a raid and then adopted and assimilated into the tribe. Kahenta had been baptized Catholic and educated by French missionaries in Trois-Rivières, east of Montreal. Mohawk warriors captured her and took her to their homeland. Kahenta eventually married Kenneronkwa. Tekakwitha was the first of their two children. A brother followed.

When Tekakwitha was around four years old, her parents and her brother died of smallpox. Tekakwitha survived, but suffered from facial scars and impaired eyesight. Due to her scars, she wore head covering and cloths to cover them. She was soon adopted and went to live with her father's sister and her husband, a chief of the Turtle Clan.

At age 11, Tekakwitha was visited by three members of the Society of Jesus. Tekakwitha was greatly impressed by these Jesuits, who were likely the first white Christians she had encountered in her life. Tekakwitha began to lead a life according to the teachings of the three Jesuits. She was staying with an uncle at the time, and he and other people of her tribe opposed her conversion.

The Jesuits' account of Tekakwitha said that she was a modest girl who avoided social gatherings and covered her head because of her scars. She was skilled at making clothing, weaving mats, preparing food and other traditional women's arts. As was the custom, she was pressured to think about marriage around age thirteen, but she refused. When speaking to her confessor, she stated, "I can have no spouse but Jesus." She followed by proclaiming, "I have the strongest aversion to marriage."

== Upheaval and invasions ==
Tekakwitha grew up in a period of upheaval, as the Mohawks interacted with French and Dutch colonists, who were competing in the lucrative fur trade. Trying to make inroads in Haudenosaunee territory, the French attacked the Mohawks in present-day central New York in 1666. After driving the people from their homes, the French burned the three Mohawk villages. Tekakwitha, around ten years old, fled with her new family.

After being defeated by the French forces, the Mohawks accepted a peace treaty that required them to tolerate Jesuit missionaries in their villages. The Jesuits established a mission near present-day Auriesville, New York. They spoke of Christianity in terms with which the Mohawsk could identify.

The Mohawks rebuilt Caughnawaga on the north bank of the river later named for them. (The present-day town of Fonda, New York developed just east of here in the mid-18th century.) In 1667, when Tekakwitha was 11 years old, she met Jesuit missionaries Jacques Frémin, Jacques Bruyas, and Jean Pierron, who had come to the village. Her uncle opposed any contact with them because he did not want her to convert to Christianity. One of his older daughters had already become Catholic.

In the summer of 1669, several hundred Mohican warriors, advancing from the east, launched an attack on Caughnawaga. Tekakwitha, at that point around 13 years old, joined other girls to help priest Jean Pierron tend to the wounded, bury the dead, and carry food and water.

== Feast of the Dead ==
Later in 1669, the Haudenosaunee Feast of the Dead was convened at Caughnawaga. The remains of Tekakwitha's parents, along with others, were to be part of the ceremony. Father Pierron criticized the Feast of the Dead, but the assembled Haudenosaunee ordered him to be silent. Afterward, however, they relented and promised to give up the feast.

== Family pressures ==
By the time Tekakwitha turned 17, around 1673, her adoptive mother and aunt tried to arrange her marriage to a young Mohawk man. Tekakwitha fled the cabin and hid in a nearby field and continued to resist marriage. Eventually, her aunts gave up their efforts to get her to marry.

In the spring of 1674, at age eighteen, Tekakwitha met the Jesuit priest Jacques de Lamberville, who was visiting the village. In the presence of others, Tekakwitha told him her story and her desire to become a Christian. She started studying the catechism with him.

== Conversion and Kahnawake ==
In his journal, Lamberville wrote about Tekakwitha in the years after her death. This text described her before she was baptized as a mild-mannered girl. Lamberville also stated that Tekakwitha did everything she could to practice her Catholic faith in a non-Catholic society, which often caused minor conflicts with her longhouse residents. The journal, however, does not mention violence toward Tekakwitha, while other sources do.

Lamberville baptized Tekakwitha at the age of 19, on Easter Sunday, April 18, 1676. Tekakwitha was renamed "Catherine" after St. Catherine of Siena (Kateri is the Mohawk form of the name).

She remained in Caughnawauga for another six months. Some Mohawks opposed her conversion and accused her of sorcery. Other members of her village stoned, threatened, and harassed her. Tekakwitha fled her home and travelled 200 miles to St. Francis Xavier, a Christian Indian mission in Sault Saint-Louis. Tekakwitha found it was a community full of other Native Americans who had also converted. Tekakwitha joined them in 1677.

Tekakwitha was said to have put thorns on her sleeping mat and lain on them while praying for her relatives' conversion and forgiveness. Piercing the body to draw blood was a traditional ritual practice of the Mohawks and other Haudenosaunee nations. Many of the priests in her community opposed it, as they were concerned about her already poor health.

Tekakwitha reportedly pushed back against these concerns saying, "I will willingly abandon this miserable body to hunger and suffering, provided that my soul may have its ordinary nourishment." Around this time she also began a friendship with another woman named Marie Thérèse Tegaianguenta. The two of them tried to start a Native religious order, but Jesuits rejected that proposal. She lived at Kahnawake the remaining two years of her life.

Father Cholonec wrote that Tekakwitha said:

I have deliberated enough. For a long time, my decision on what I will do has been made. I have consecrated myself entirely to Jesus, son of Mary, I have chosen Him for husband, and He alone will take me for wife.

Many consider this decision, made in 1679 on the Feast of the Annunciation, to be the completion of Tekakwitha's conversion. Jesuit authors described her in early biographies as the "first Iroquois virgin." Although Tekakwitha is often regarded as a consecrated virgin, she could not, owing to circumstances, receive the consecration of virgins by a bishop. Nevertheless, the United States Association of Consecrated Virgins later took Kateri Tekakwitha as its patroness.

== Mission du Sault St-Louis: Kahnawake ==
The Jesuits had founded Kahnawake for the religious conversion of Native people. Natives built a traditional longhouses to be used as a chapel by Jesuits. Kahnawake was, however, at risk of being attacked by members of the Haudenosaunee Confederacy who had not converted to Catholicism.

After Tekakwitha's arrival, she shared the longhouse of her older sister and her husband. She would have known other people in the longhouse who had migrated from their former village of Gandaouagué (Caughnawaga). Her mother's close friend, Anastasia Tegonhatsiongo, and other Mohawk women introduced Tekakwitha to the regular practices of Christianity. This was normal. Pierre Cholenec reported that "all the Iroquois who come here and then become Christians owe their conversion mainly to the zeal of their relatives."

Kahnawake was a village set up like normal Haudenosaunee villages, moving from location to location after running out of resources. The village was originally not wholly French, but with northward migration towards Canada started by the Five Nations, the village started to gain more Native members. The Five Nations all happened to start migrating north around the same time, without any communication between them. In Kahnawake, there was representation from multiple tribes, and when the French came there were people from different ethnicities. The village was recognized by New France, and given autonomy to deal with problems that would arise. They were also able to form a friendship with New York through this autonomy.

There was fur trade in Kahnawake. The division between the French Church and the Natives was clear-cut in the village; there were few interactions between the two.

Kahnawake was drawn into a war among the different tribes that lasted around two and a half years.

=== Jesuit Missionaries Chauchetière and Cholenec ===
Jesuit priests Claude Chauchetière and Pierre Cholenec played important roles in Tekakwitha's life. Both were based in New France and Kahnawake. Chauchetière was the first to write a biography of Tekakwitha in 1695, and Cholenec followed in 1696. Cholenec, who had arrived first, introduced traditional items of Catholic mortification, that is, physical deprivation or self-harm, to the converts at Kahnawake. He wanted them to adopt these rather than use Mohawk ritual practices. Both Chauchetière and Tekakwitha arrived in Kahnawake the same year, in 1677.

Chauchetière came to believe that Tekakwitha was a saint. In his biography of Kateri, he stressed her "charity, industry, purity, and fortitude." In contrast, Cholenec stressed her virginity, perhaps to counter colonial stereotypes characterizing Indian women as promiscuous.

== Death and appearances ==
Around Holy Week of 1680, friends noted that Tekakwitha's health was failing. When people knew she had but a few hours left, villagers gathered together, accompanied by the priests Chauchetière and Cholenec, the latter providing the last rites. Kateri Tekakwitha died at around 15:00 (3 p.m.) on Holy Wednesday, April 17, 1680, at the age of 23 or 24, in the arms of her friend Marie-Therèse. Chauchetière reports her final words were, "Jesus, Mary, I love you."

After her death, the people noticed a physical change. Cholenec later wrote, "This face, so marked and swarthy, suddenly changed about a quarter of an hour after her death and became in a moment so beautiful and so white that I observed it immediately." Her smallpox scars were said to disappear.

Tekakwitha purportedly appeared to three individuals in the weeks after her death; her mentor Anastasia Tegonhatsiongo, her friend Marie-Therèse Tegaiaguenta, and Chauchetière. Anastasia said that, while crying over the death of her spiritual daughter, she looked up to see Tekakwitha "kneeling at the foot" of her mattress, "holding a wooden cross that shone like the sun." Marie-Thérèse reported that she was awakened at night by a knocking on her wall, and a voice asked if she were awake, adding, "I've come to say good-bye; I'm on my way to heaven." Marie-Thérèse went outside but saw no one; she heard a voice murmur, "Adieu, Adieu, go tell the father that I'm going to heaven." Chauchetière meanwhile said he saw Tekakwitha at her grave; he said she appeared in "baroque splendor; for two hours he gazed upon her" and "her face lifted toward heaven as if in ecstasy."

== Veneration ==
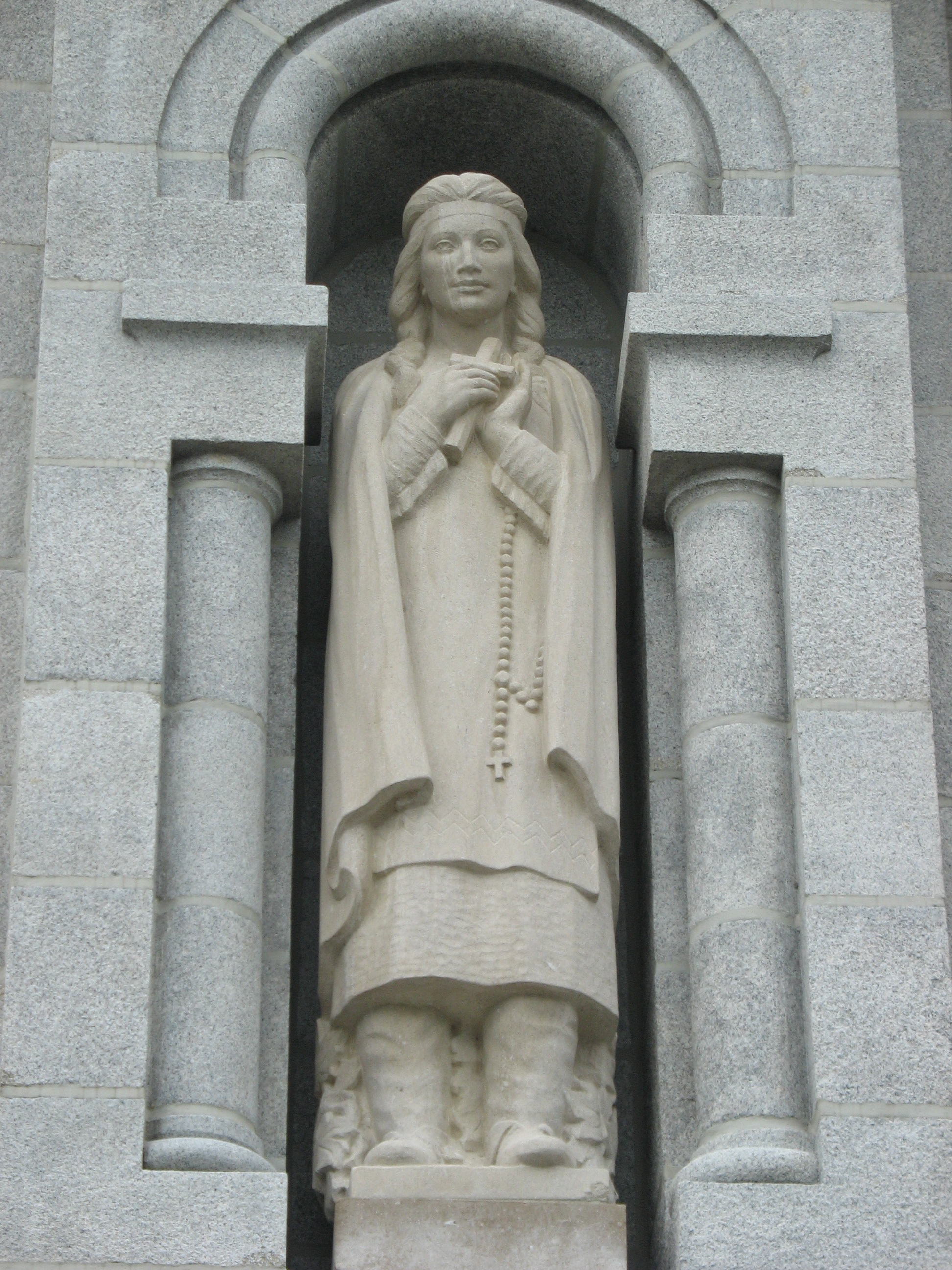
Statue of Saint Kateri Tekakwitha by Joseph-Émile Brunet at the Basilica of Sainte-Anne-de-Beaupré, near Quebec City

The first account of Kateri Tekakwitha was not published until 1715. Because of Tekakwitha's unique path to chastity, she is often referred to as a lily, a traditional symbol of purity. Religious images of Tekakwitha are often decorated with a lily and cross, with feathers or turtle as cultural accessories alluding to her Native American birth. Popular epithets for Tekakwitha are The Lily of the Mohawks (most notable), the Mohawk Maiden, and the Lily of Purity. Her tribal neighbors – and her gravestone – referred to her as "the fairest flower that ever bloomed among the redmen."

Fifty years after her death, a convent for Native American nuns opened in Mexico. Indian Catholic missions and bishops in the 1880s initiated a petition for officially allowing veneration of Kateri. They asked for the veneration of Tekakwitha in tandem with the Jesuits Isaac Jogues and René Goupil, two Catholic missionaries who had been slain by the Mohawks in Osernnenon a few decades before Kateri's birth. They concluded their petition by stating that these venerations would help encourage Catholicism among other Native Americans.

The process for Kateri Tekakwitha's canonization was initiated by United States Catholics at the Third Plenary Council of Baltimore in 1885, followed by Canadian Catholics. Some 906 Native Americans signed 27 letters in the US and Canada urging her canonization. Her spiritual writings were approved by theologians on July 8, 1936, and her cause was formally opened on May 19, 1939, granting her the title of Servant of God.

On January 3, 1943, Pope Pius XII declared her venerable. She was beatified as on June 22, 1980, by Pope John Paul II.

In 2006, a young boy from Whatcom County in Washington state, Jake Finkbonner, was lying near death due to flesh-eating bacteria. According to the parents, the doctors believed he was incurable. Being of Lummi descent, the boy's parents knew about Kateri Tekakwitha and prayed to her. Jake survived the ordeal and made a full recovery. His healing was the first of Tekakwitha's miracles accepted by the Vatican.

On December 19, 2011, the Congregation for the Causes of Saints certified a second miracle. She was canonized on October 21, 2012, by Pope Benedict XVI. She is the first Native American woman of North America to be canonized by the Catholic Church.

In 2022, the Episcopal Church of the United States gave final approval to a feast dedicated to Tekakwitha on April 17 on the liturgical calendar.

Kateri Tekakwitha is featured in four national shrines in the United States: the Saint Kateri Tekakwitha National Shrine in Fonda, New York; the National Shrine of the North American Martyrs in Auriesville, New York; the Basilica of the National Shrine of the Immaculate Conception in Washington, D.C.; and The National Shrine of the Cross in the Woods, an open-air sanctuary in Indian River, Michigan. The latter shrine's design was inspired by Tekakwitha's habit of placing small wooden crosses throughout the woods.

=== Statues ===
There are numerous statues of Tekakwitha, among them are:

- a granite monument in Kahnawake, financed by Clarence A. Walworth.
- the Basilica San Juan Capistrano in Orange County, California
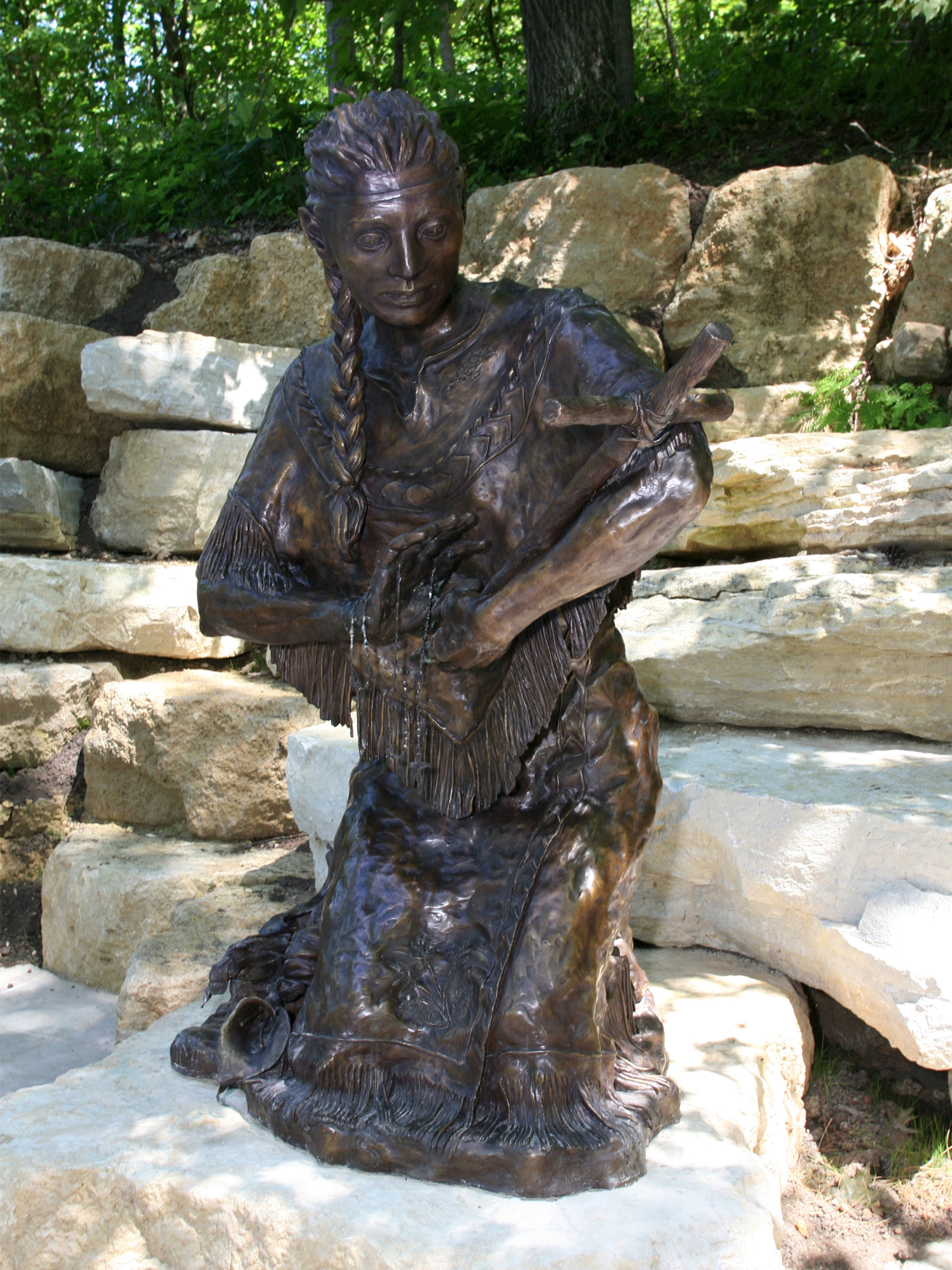
  Statue of Saint Kateri Tekakwitha by Cynthia Hitschler at the Shrine of Our Lady of Guadalupe, in La Crosse, Wisconsin
- in St. Kateri Tekakwitha Church in Santa Clarita, California. A statue of Saint Kateri Tekakwitha stands at the steps of Holy Cross School at San Buenaventura Mission in Southern California
- the Shrine of Our Lady of Guadalupe in La Crosse, Wisconsin
- the bronze portal of St. Patrick's Cathedral in New York City.
- the Maryknoll Sisters' church at Ossining, New York
- St. Patrick's church in the St. Stanislaus Kostka parish of Pittsburgh
- Holy Cross Chapel Mausoleum in North Arlington, New Jersey
- a Shrine of St. Kateri Tekakwitha is located in Paris, Stark County, Ohio
- a shrine and church in rural Centre County, Pennsylvania, United States, in the town of Spring Mills.
- a wooden statue stands prominent to the right of the main altar at San Xavier del Bac Mission, a mission church completed in 1797, south of Tucson, Arizona.
- Statue, Maryrest Cemetery and Mausoleum, Mahwah, New Jersey

== Miracles ==
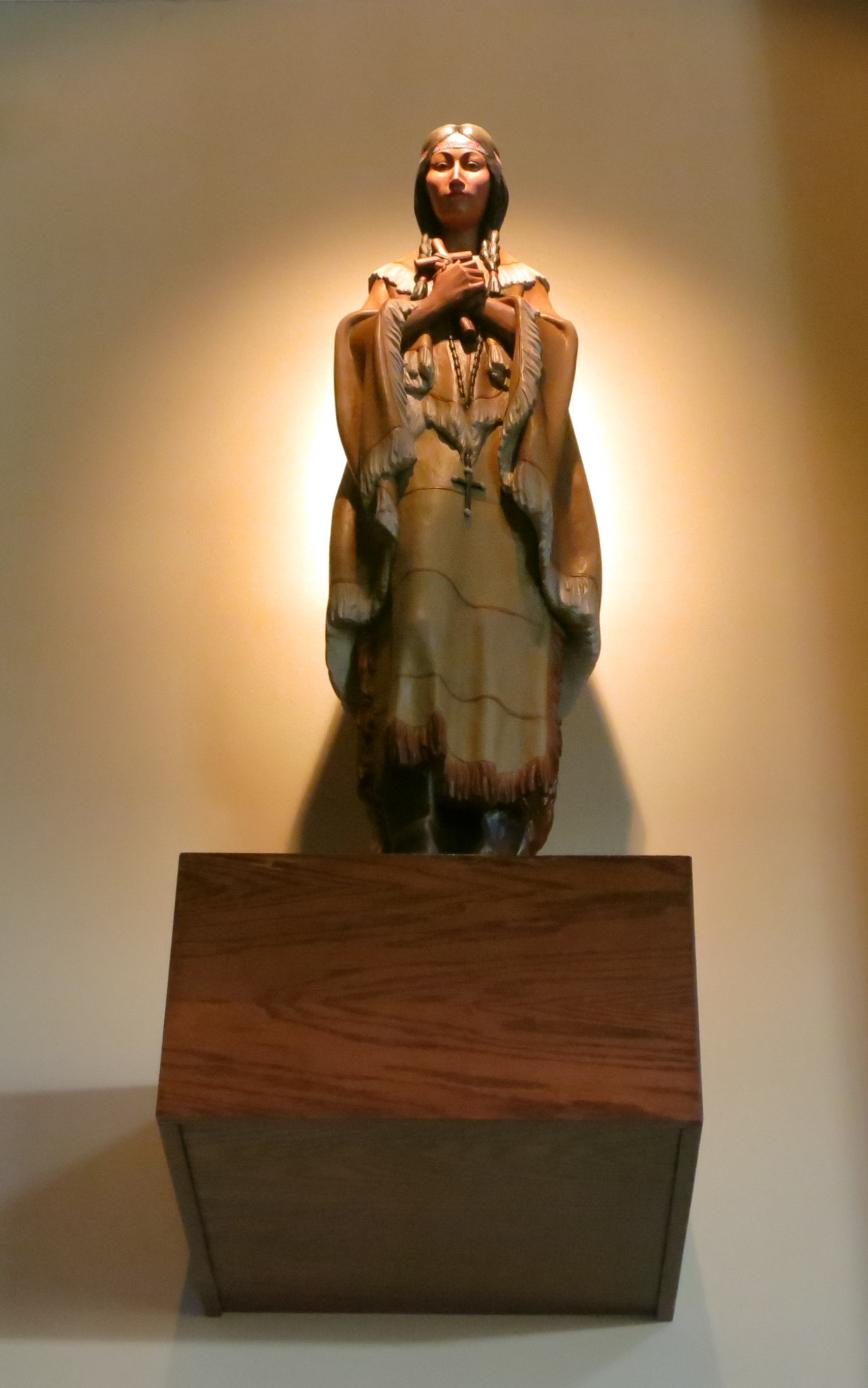
A statue of Saint Kateri Tekakwitha in Saint John Neumann Catholic Church, Sunbury, Ohio

Joseph Kellogg was a Protestant child captured by Natives in the eighteenth century and eventually returned to his home. Twelve months later, he caught smallpox. Jesuits treated him, but he was not recovering. They had relics from Tekakwitha's grave but did not want to use them on a non-Catholic. One Jesuit told Kellogg that if he would become a Catholic, help would come to him. Joseph did so. The Jesuit gave him a piece of decayed wood from Tekakwitha's coffin, which is said to have healed him. Historian Allan Greer takes this account to mean that Tekakwitha was known in 18th-century New France, and she was already perceived to have healing abilities.

Other miracles were attributed to Tekakwitha: Father Rémy recovered his hearing, and a nun in Montreal was cured by using items formerly belonging to Tekakwitha. Such incidents were evidence that Tekakwitha was possibly a saint. Following the death of a person, sainthood is symbolized by events that show the rejection of death. It is also represented by a duality of pain and neutralization of the other's pain (all shown by her reputed miracles in New France). Chauchetière told settlers in La Prairie to pray to Tekakwitha for intercession with illnesses. Due to the Jesuits' superior system of publicizing material, his words and Tekakwitha's fame were said to reach Jesuits in China and their converts.

As people believed in her healing powers, some collected earth from her gravesite and wore it in bags as a relic. One woman said she was saved from pneumonia (grande maladie du rhume) by wearing such. She gave the pendant to her husband, who was healed from his disease.

On December 19, 2011, Pope Benedict XVI approved the second miracle needed for Tekakwitha's canonization. The authorized miracle dates from 2006, when a young boy in Washington state survived a severe flesh-eating bacterium. Doctors had been unable to stop the disease's progress by surgery and advised his parents he was likely to die. The boy received the sacrament of Anointing of the Sick from a Catholic priest. As the boy is half Lummi Indian, the parents said they prayed to Tekakwitha for divine intercession, as did their family and friends, and an extended network contacted through their son's classmates. Sister Kateri Mitchell visited the boy's bedside and placed a relic of Tekakwitha, a bone fragment, against his body and prayed together with his parents. The next day, the infection stopped its progression.

== Indigenous perspectives ==
Mohawk scholar Orenda Boucher noted that, in her opinion, there were "mixed feelings" surrounding the canonization of Tekakwitha. There are traditionalist Mohawks who feel her story was tied into the tragedies of colonization that deeply affected the people of Kahnawake. Despite this dark past, Tekakwitha herself is generally respected among Catholic and traditionalist Mohawks alike. Much of the debate surrounding Tekakwitha's canonization is built upon the idea that it was done to bolster the image of the Church among Native Americans.

Boucher has stated that to understand the complexities of Takakwitha's life, it was important to look beyond the biographies written by clergymen who focus on what they consider her Christian virtues. Mohawk writer Doug George-Kanentiio further noted the concern that Tekakwitha's sainthood may be used as way to influence the Haudenosaunee away from their Indigenous ancestral values, stating:

[Tekakwitha's sainthood] should never obscure the best elements of our aboriginal spirituality, nor should Kateri's personal behaviors, given their extremities [i.e., self-mutilation with whips, thorns, and hot coals], be endorsed as a model for women anywhere. [...] Women in particular need not kneel in supplication to any man or any god but to rise to dance and sing in true joy. [...] We can never accept any institution which actively suppresses women or qualifies their potential.

Mohawk journalist Chaz Kader, a former Catholic now practicing longhouse traditions, noted that while many traditionalist Mohawks recognize the reverence their Catholic relatives and friends have for Tekakwitha, many were troubled by Catholic portrayals of her life. Kader highlights how church writings describe Tekakwitha's torment, ostracism, and persecution at the hands of other Mohawks, noting that "the contrast of good Mohawks and bad Mohawks still is affecting our people.

Some Catholics of Native American and European ancestries feel her sainthood reflects her unique position as a bridge builder and worker for unity. Paula E. Holmes interviewed several elderly Native American women in the late 1990s and found they considered Tekakwitha "part of their Indian familiar and familial heritage."

== In Art ==
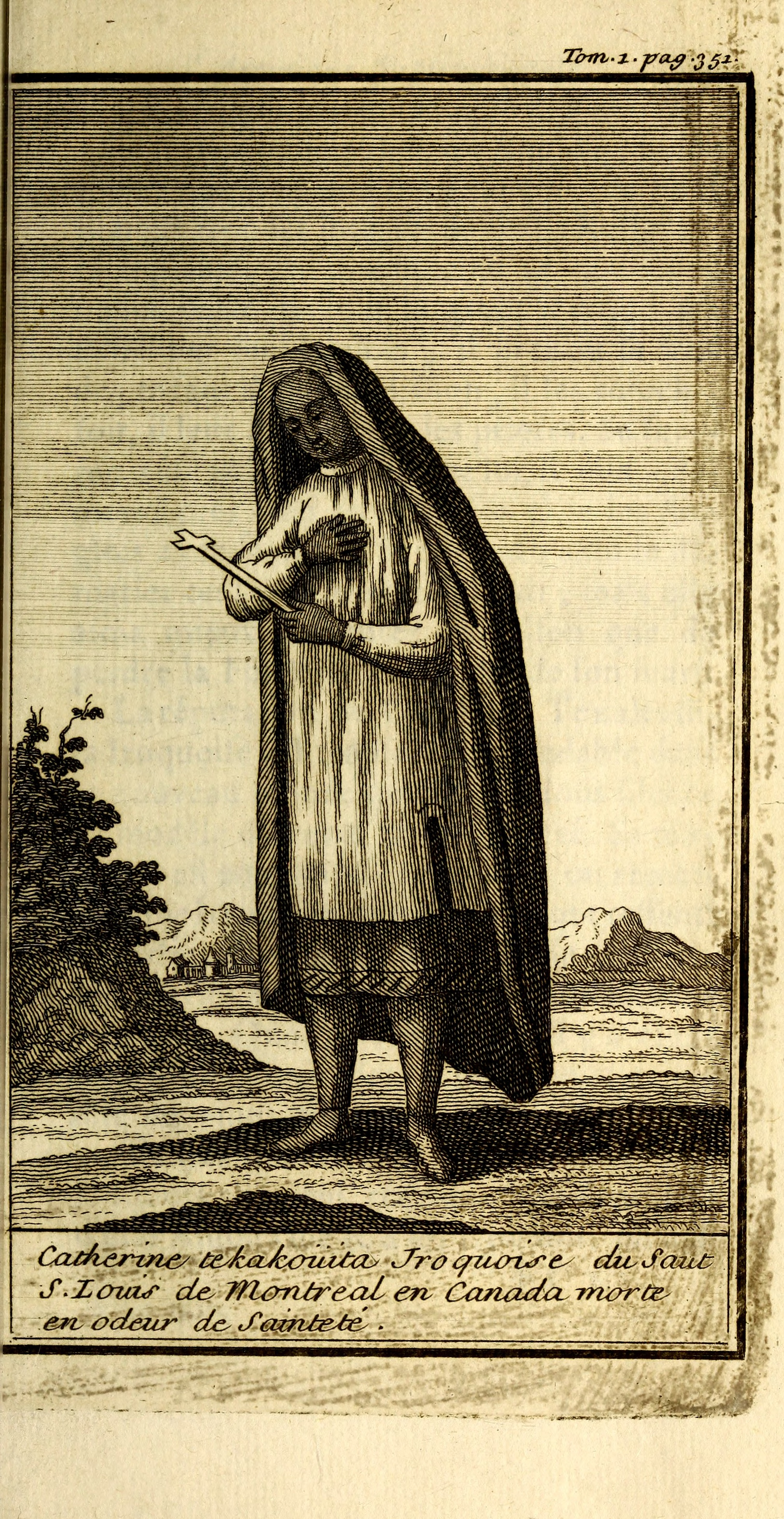
Bacqueville de la Potherie, Catherine Tekakouíta (1753)

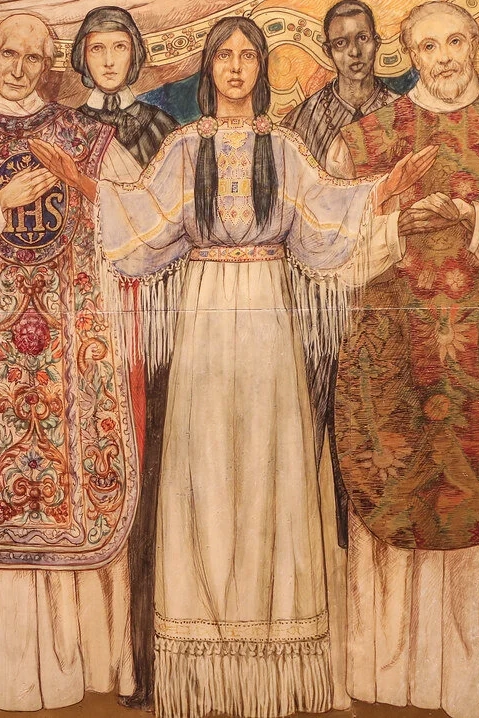
Jan Henryk de Rosen, Saint Kateri Tekakwitha (detail) (1943)

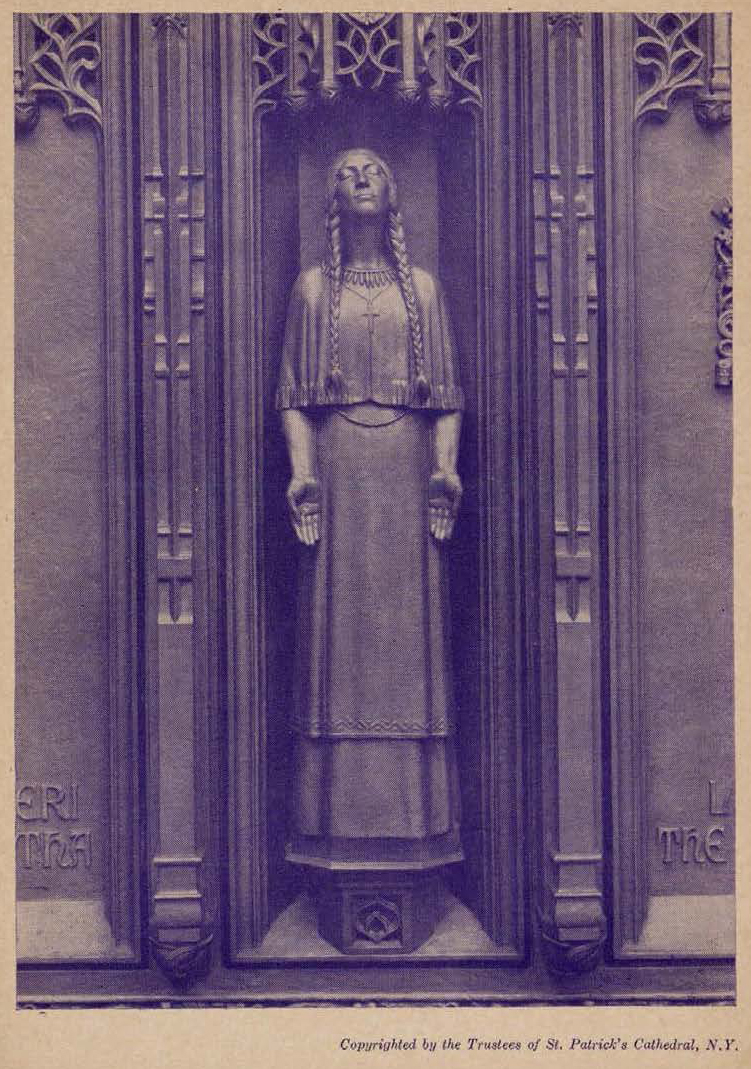
John Angel, Ven. Kateri Tekakwitha, Lily of The Mohawks (1949)

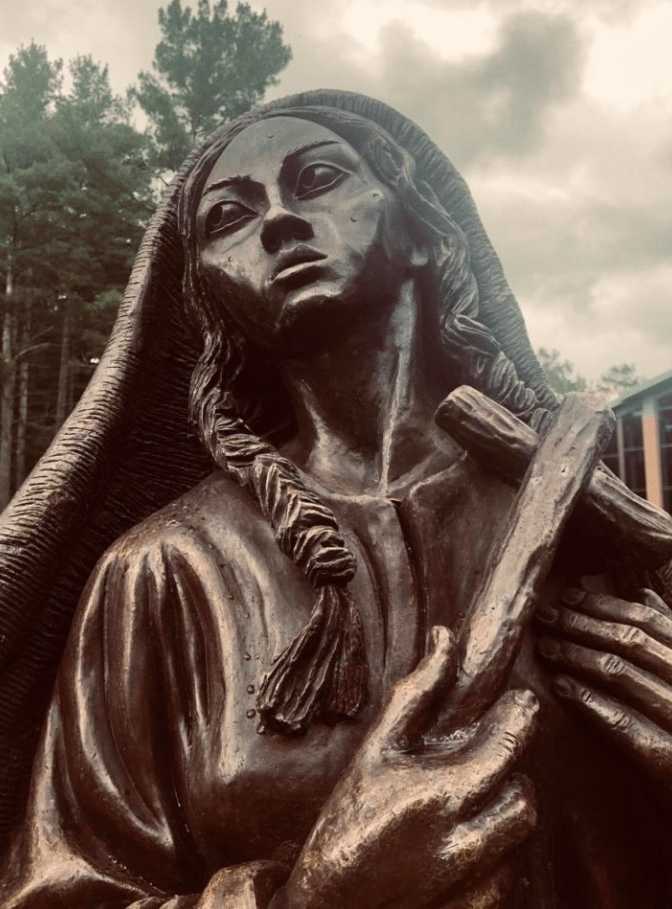
Timothy P. Schmalz, Saint Kateri Tekakwitha (detail) (2001)

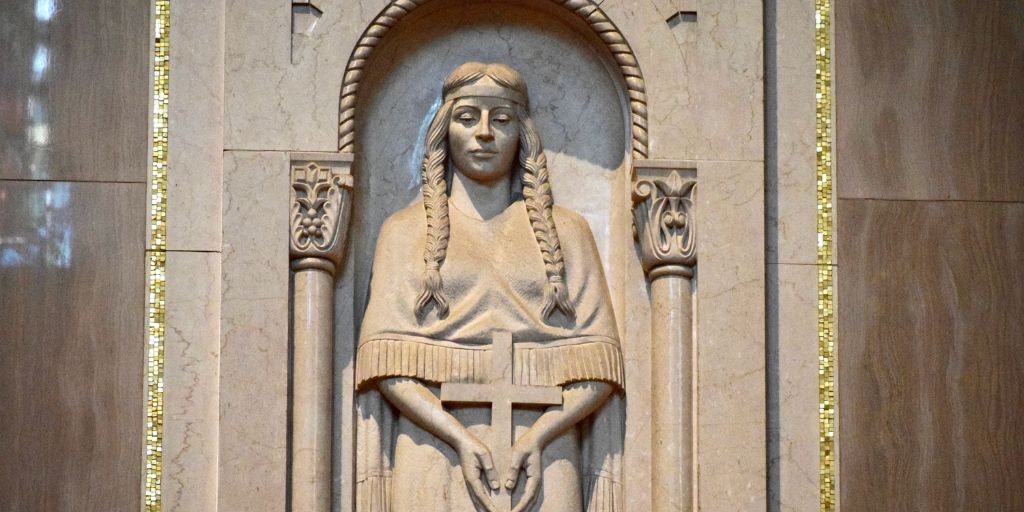
Dale Claude Lamphere, statue of St. Kateri Tekakwitha (2016)

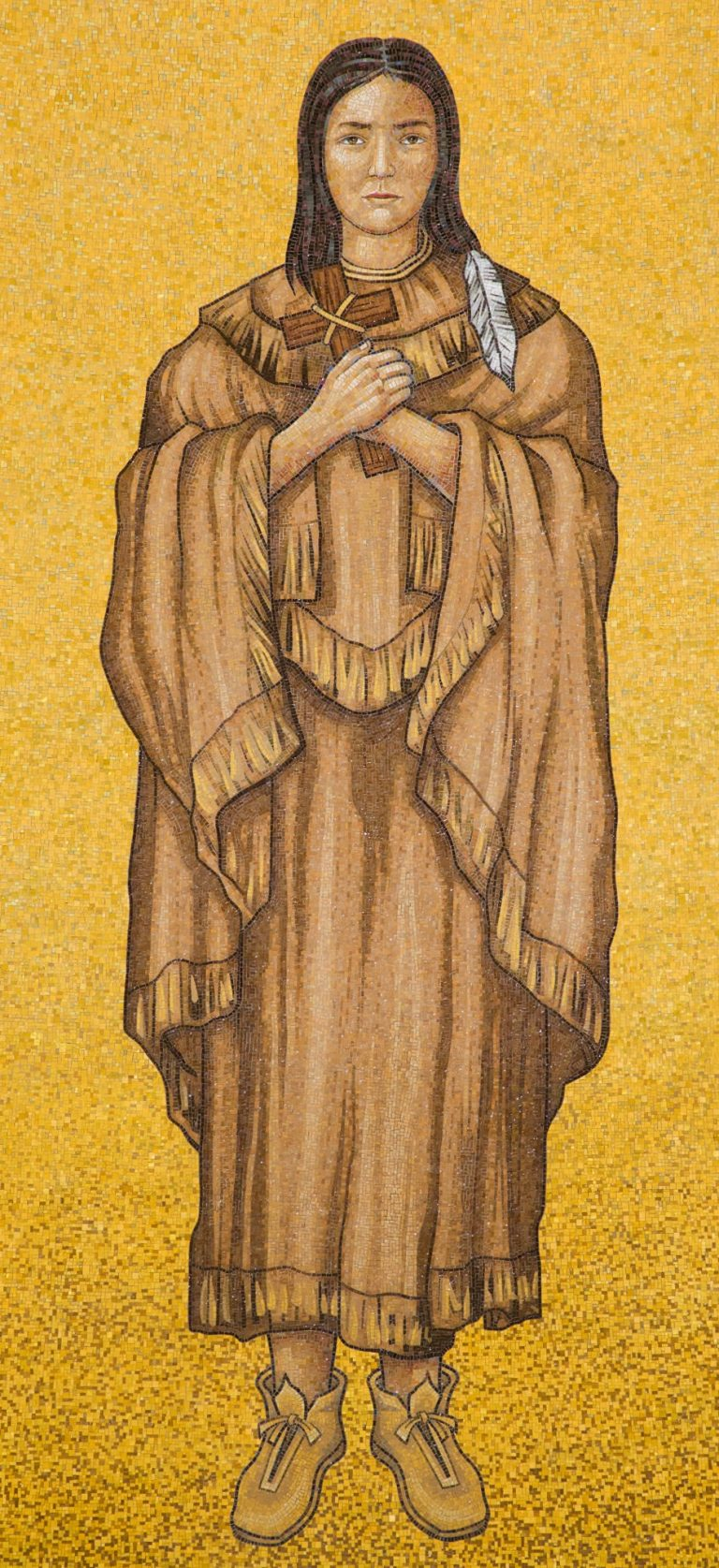
The Trinity Dome, Basilica of the National Shrine of the Immaculate Conception (detail) (2017)

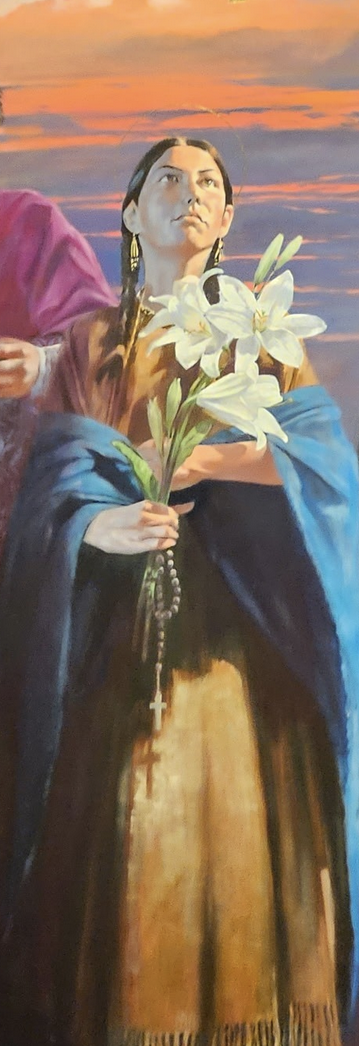
Adam Cvijanovic, What’s So Funny about Peace, Love and Understanding (detail) (2025)

== Cultural references ==
More than 300 books have been published in more than 20 languages on the life of Kateri Tekakwitha. The historian K. I. Koppedrayer has suggested that the Catholic Church fathers' hagiography of Tekakwitha reflected "trials and rewards of the European presence in the New World."

=== Stage performances ===
American composer Nellie von Gerichten Smith (1871–1952) created an opera entitled Lily of the Mohawks: Kateri Tekakwitha (text by Edward C. La More). It was not the first stage performance of her life; Joseph Clancy's play, The Princess of the Mohawks, was performed often by schoolchildren starting in the 1930s.

=== Literature ===
- Leonard Cohen, Beautiful Losers (1966)
- William T. Vollmann, Fathers and Crows (1992)
- Victor O'Connell, Eaglechild (2016)
- Louise Erdrich, Future Home of the Living God (2017)
- Diane Glancy, The Reason for Crows (2019)

=== Animation ===
- In the French animated series Clémentine, Clémentine Dumant meets and befriends Tekakwitha.

=== Music ===
- Niall Connolly, song "Lily of the Mohawks" on his album Sound (2013)

== Eponyms ==
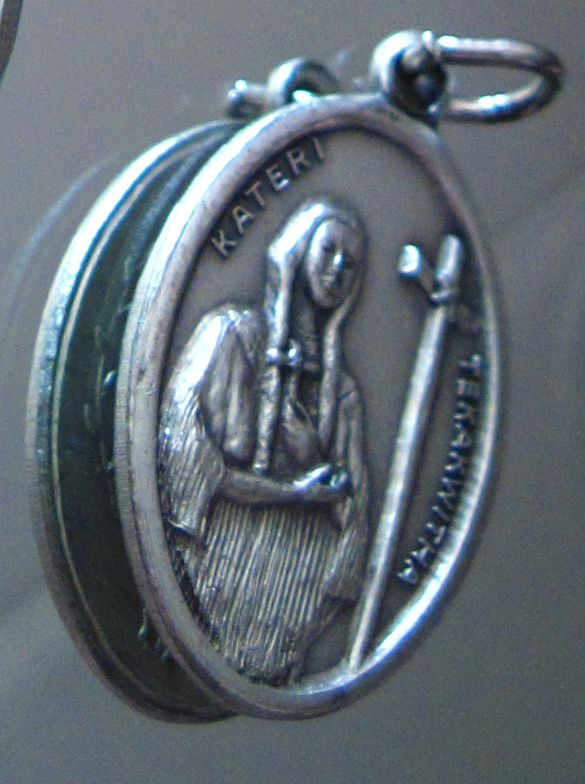
Blessed Kateri devotional medal

Numerous churches, schools and other Catholic institutions have been named for her, particularly since her canonization. Among these are Canadian schools in Kitchener, Markham, Hamilton, London, Orléans (Ottawa), and Calgary, Alberta. In the United States, Catholic Churches are named after her in Dearborn, MI, Buffalo, TX, Sparta, NJ, Schenectady, NY (parish and school), Irondequoit, NY (parish and school), Santa Clarita, CA, Warm Springs, OR, and Plymouth, MA. A school is named after her in Niskayuna, NY.

Kateri Residence, a nursing home in Manhattan, is named for her. The chapel of Welsh Family Hall at the University of Notre Dame, built in 1997, is dedicated to her.

Since 1939, the Tekakwitha Conference meets annually to support Catholic missions among Native Americans. People gather in Kateri Circles to pray together, seeking to become better Catholics. In 1991, the conference reported 130 registered Kateri Circles.

Tekakwitha Island (French: Île Tekakwitha) in the St. Lawrence River, part of the Kahnawake reserve, is named after her.

Tekakwitha Woods in St. Charles, Illinois is named after her at the request of the local Sisters of Mercy religious order who sold the land to the Forest Preserve District of Kane County, Illinois in 1992.
