= Canadian Martyrs =

French Jesuit martyrs

Saints Canadian Martyrs
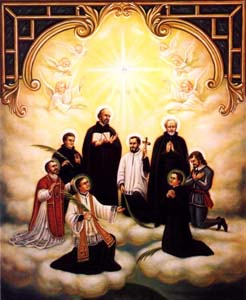
- Holy card depicting the martyrs

Martyrs Missionaries Apostles of the Hurons
- Born: France
- Died: 17th century, Canada and Upstate New York
- Martyred by: Haudenosaunee
- Venerated in: Catholic Church; Anglicanism
- Beatified: June 21, 1925, Rome, by Pope Pius XI
- Canonized: June 29, 1930, Rome, by Pope Pius XI
- Major shrine: Martyrs' Shrine, Midland, Ontario, Canada; National Shrine of the North American Martyrs, Auriesville, New York
- Feast: September 26 (in Canada and among Traditional Roman Catholics); October 19 (General Calendar); Anglican Church of Canada
- Patronage: Canada

The Canadian Martyrs (French: Martyrs canadiens), also known as the North American Martyrs (French: Saints martyrs canadiens, Holy Canadian Martyrs), were eight Jesuit missionaries from Sainte-Marie among the Hurons. They were ritually tortured and killed on various dates in the mid-17th century in Canada, in what is now southern Ontario, and in upstate New York, during the warfare between the Haudenosaunee and the Wendat (Huron). They have subsequently been canonized and venerated as martyrs by the Catholic Church.

The martyrs are:

Name	Date of death	Place of death	Means of death
Br. René Goupil	September 29, 1642	Ossernenon, near Auriesville, New York	tomahawk to the head
Fr. Isaac Jogues	October 18, 1646	Ossernenon, near Auriesville, New York	tomahawk to the head
Jean de Lalande	October 19, 1646	Ossernenon, near Auriesville, New York	tomahawk to the head
Fr. Antoine Daniel	July 4, 1648	Teanaostaye, near Hillsdale, Ontario	shot
Fr. Jean de Brébeuf	March 16, 1649	St. Ignace, near Sainte-Marie among the Hurons, Ontario	boiling water and fire at the stake
Fr. Gabriel Lalemant	March 17, 1649	St. Ignace, near Sainte-Marie among the Hurons, Ontario	boiling water and fire at the stake
Fr.Charles Garnier	December 7, 1649	near Collingwood, Ontario	shot
Fr. Noël Chabanel	December 8, 1649	Nottawasaga River, Ontario	tomahawk to the head

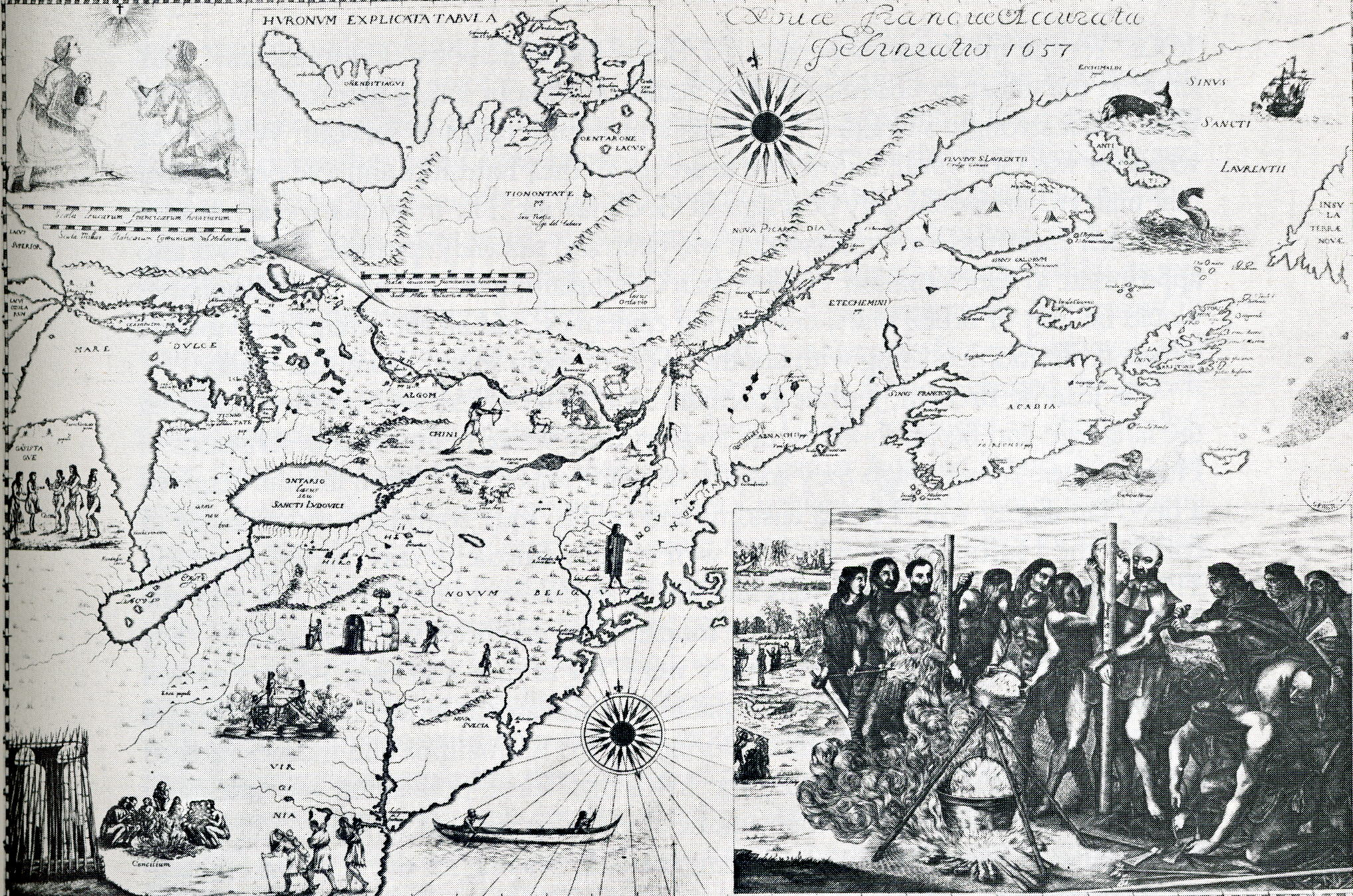
Jesuit map

== Background ==
Jesuit missionaries worked among the Wendat (Huron), an Iroquoian-speaking people who occupied territory in the Georgian Bay area of Central Ontario. The area of their traditional territory is called Huronia or Wendake. The Wendat in this area were farmers, fishermen and traders who lived in villages surrounded by defensive wooden palisades for protection. Sainte-Marie among the Hurons was the headquarters for the French Jesuit Mission to the Wendat people.

By the late 1640s, the Jesuits believed they were making progress in their mission to the Wendat, and claimed to have made many converts. But, the priests were not universally trusted. Many Wendat considered them to be malevolent shamans who brought death and disease wherever they travelled; after European contact, the Wendat had suffered high fatalities in epidemics after 1634 of smallpox and other Eurasian infectious diseases.

The traditional rivals of the Wendat were the Haudenosaunee (Iroquois), a confederacy of five nations located south and east of the Great Lakes. The nations of the Haudenosaunee Confederacy considered the Jesuits legitimate targets of their raids and warfare, as the missionaries were nominally allies of the Wendat and French fur traders. Retaliating for French colonial attacks against the Haudenosaunee was also a reason for their raids against the Wendat and Jesuits.

In 1642, the Mohawk, one of the nations of the Haudenosaunee captured René Goupil, and Father Isaac Jogues, bringing them back to their village of Ossernenon south of the Mohawk River. They ritually tortured both men and killed Goupil. After several months of captivity, Jogues was ransomed by Dutch traders and the minister Johannes Megapolensis from New Netherland (later Albany). He returned for a time to France, but then sailed back to Quebec. In 1646 he and Jean de Lalande were killed during a visit to Ossernenon intended to achieve peace between the French and the Mohawk.

Other Jesuit missionaries were killed by the Mohawk and martyred in the following years: Antoine Daniel (1648), Jean de Brébeuf (1649), Noël Chabanel (1649), Charles Garnier (1649), and Gabriel Lalemant (1649). All were canonized in 1930 as the Canadian Martyrs, also known as the North American Martyrs.

== Legacy and honours ==
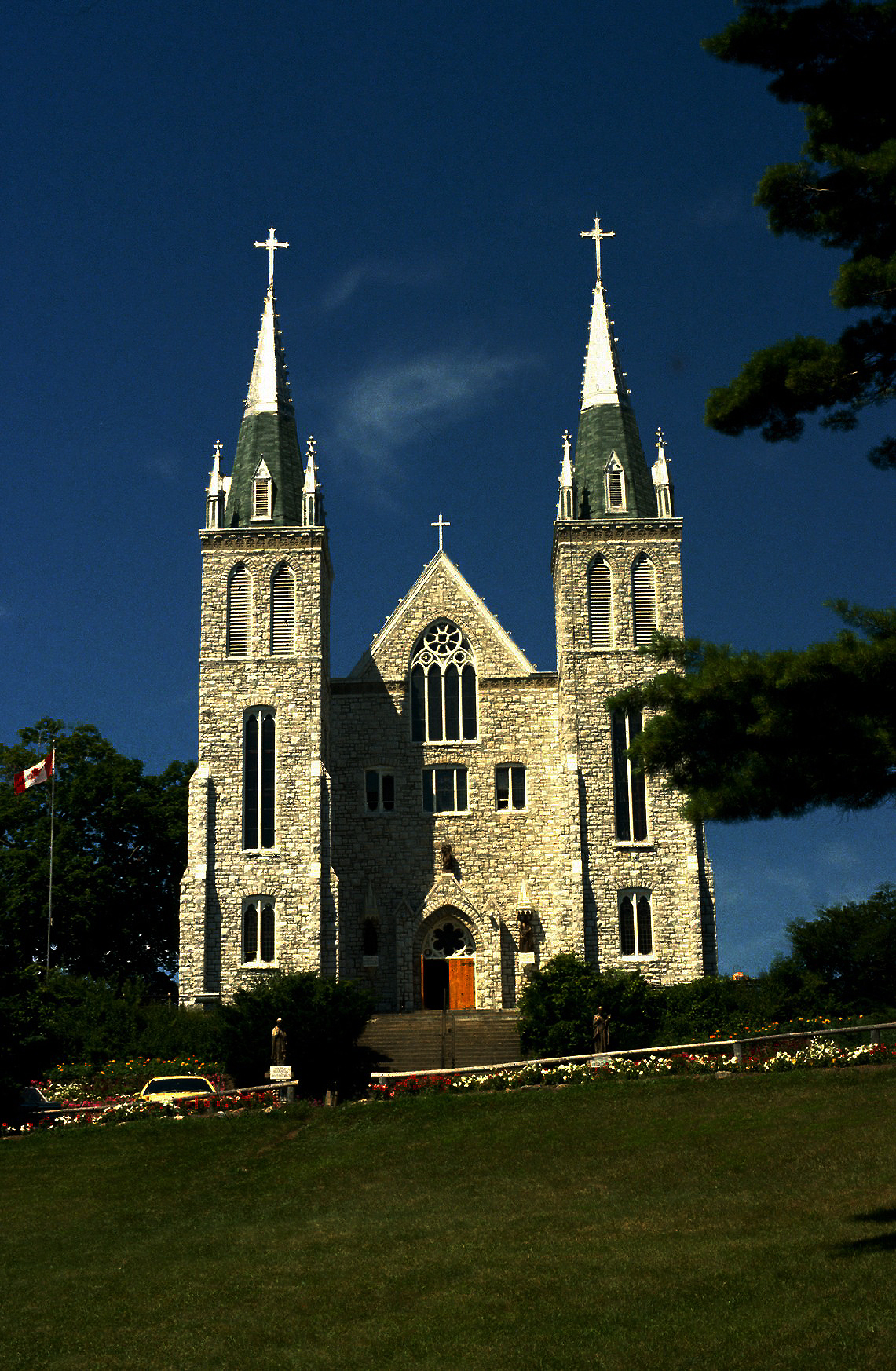
Martyr's Shrine, Midland, Ontario

The martyrs were canonized by Pope Pius XI in 1930. They are collectively the secondary patron saints of Canada. St. René Goupil, St. Isaac Jogues, and St. Jean de Lalande are the first three U.S. saints, martyred at Ossernenon, 9 miles (14.5 km) west of the confluence of the Schoharie and Mohawk rivers. Their feast day is celebrated in the General Roman Calendar and in the United States on October 19 under the title of "John de Brébeuf and Isaac Jogues, Priests, and Companions, Martyrs," and in Canada on September 26.

The Martyrs' Shrine in Midland, Ontario, the site of the Jesuits' missionary work among the Huron, is the National Shrine to the Canadian Martyrs.

A National Shrine of the North American Martyrs has been constructed and dedicated in Auriesville, New York. It is located south of the Mohawk River, near a Jesuit cemetery containing remains of missionaries who died in the area from 1669 to 1684, when the Jesuits had a local mission to the Mohawk.

The torture of the martyrs by the Haudenosaunee is the subject depicted in the twelve-light World War I memorial window (1933) by Charles William Kelsey at the Loyola College (Montreal) chapel, at the Chapel of Our Lady of Lourdes on the campus of Georgetown Preparatory School in North Bethesda, Maryland, and a side shine at Madonna Della Strada Chapel on the campus of Loyola University Chicago. Fordham University additionally has named the Martyrs' Court residential complex in their collective honour, as well as individual halls in the complex being named for Jogues, Goupil and Lalande. The North American College in Rome has a crypt chapel dedicated to the North American Martyrs.

The martyrs are also honoured at Camp Ondessonk, a Catholic summer camp in Ozark, Illinois, where each unit of cabins is named after one of the martyrs, and also at the American Martyrs Retreat House in Cedar Falls, Iowa.

=== Churches ===
Churches dedicated to the martyrs include the following:

- National Shrine of the North American Martyrs in Auriesville, New York.
- Nostra Signora del Santissimo Sacramento e Santi Martiri Canadesi, the Canadian national church in Rome
- Martyrs' Shrine in Midland, Ontario
- Canadian Martyrs Parish in Calgary, AB
- Canadian Martyrs Church in Halifax, Nova Scotia
- Canadian Martyrs Catholic Church in Ottawa, Ontario
- Canadian Martyrs Parish in Richmond, British Columbia
- Canadian Martyrs Parish in Invermere, BC
- The parish of Saints-Martyrs-Canadiens founded in 1961 in St. Boniface (now part of Winnipeg), Manitoba
- North American Martyrs Parish and School in Monroeville, Pennsylvania
- North American Martyrs Catholic Church in Lincoln, Nebraska
- North American Martyrs Catholic Church in Auburn, Massachusetts
- North American Martyrs Catholic Church, a parish of the Priestly Fraternity of St. Peter in Seattle, Washington
- St. Isaac Jogues Catholic Church in Wayne, Pennsylvania
- American Martyrs Parish in Manhattan Beach, California
- American Martyrs Roman Catholic Church in Bayside, New York.
- American Martyrs Catholic Church in Kingsford, Michigan.
- The Chapel of the North American Martyrs at the University of Detroit Jesuit High School Detroit, Michigan
- The Chapel of the North American Martyrs at Jesuit High School Sacramento, California
- The Chapel of the North American Martyrs at Jesuit High School New Orleans New Orleans, Louisiana
- The Chapel of the North American Martyrs at Walsh Jesuit High School in Cuyahoga Falls, Ohio
- The Kaboni Catholic Church (St. Anthony Daniel Parish), located in Wiikwemkoong First Nation, Ontario.
- Canadian Martyrs' Church in Hamilton, Ontario
- St-Charles Garnier Church in Hamilton Ontario
- St-Charles Garnier Church in Kelowna, British Columbia
- The parishes of Saints-Martyrs-Canadiens in Montréal, in the City of Québec, in Victoriaville, in Trois-Rivières, and in Beauharnois (province of Québec, Canada).
- Holy Martyrs of North America Catholic Church in Falmouth, Maine.

=== Schools ===
Many schools also honour the martyrs, including the following:

- The sports teams of the Pontifical North American College in Rome
- Elementary schools named after them in Guelph, Ontario, Newmarket, Ontario, East York, Ontario, Hamilton, Ontario, Burlington, Ontario, Penetanguishene, Ontario, Niagara Falls, Ontario and Victoria Harbour, Ontario
- Brebeuf Jesuit Preparatory School in Indianapolis, Indiana
- Jesuit High School in Sacramento, California, where each building on the campus has been named after one of the saints
- Jesuit High School in New Orleans, Louisiana
- Walsh Jesuit High School in Cuyahoga Falls, Ohio, which holds the martyrs as their patron saints. Walsh Jesuit's chapel is named in their honour.
- Brebeuf College School, Jesuit (formerly) Catholic Secondary School in Willowdale (north Toronto) established in 1963, named after St. Jean de Brébeuf
- Canadian Martyrs Elementary School (Grades Kindergarten to Grade 8) Ottawa, Ontario established by Oblates Of Mary Immaculate 1930-1983

=== Municipality ===
- The parish municipality of Saints-Martyrs-Canadiens, in Quebec, Canada

== See also ==
- Ajacán Mission 1571 massacre [Jesuit Martyrs]
- Jesuit missions in North America
- Christian martyrs
- Martyrs' Shrine
- National Shrine of the North American Martyrs
