= Jean de Lalande =

French Jesuit missionary and martyr

Saint John de Lalande SJ
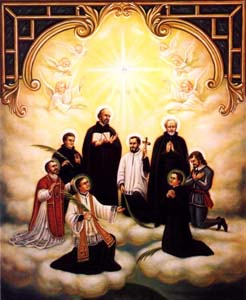
- North American Martyrs

Martyr
- Born: Dieppe, Seine-Maritime, France
- Died: October 19, 1646 (over the age of 20); Ossernenon, Haudenosauneega
- Venerated in: Catholic Church
- Beatified: June 21, 1925, Rome, Italy by Pope Pius XI
- Canonized: 29 June 1930, Rome, Italy by Pope Pius XI
- Major shrine: National Shrine of the North American Martyrs, Auriesville, New York, USA (where he was martyred)
- Feast: 19 October (general calendar), 26 September (Canada)

Jean de Lalande, SJ (French pronunciation: [ʒɑ̃ də lalɑ̃d]; died October 19, 1646) was a French Jesuit missionary at Sainte-Marie among the Hurons and one of the eight North American Martyrs. He was killed at the Mohawk village of Ossernenon after being captured by warriors.

== Life ==
Jean de Lalande was a native of Dieppe, Normandy. He arrived in New France at the age of nineteen to serve with the Jesuits in New France as a donné, a lay brother. In late September 1646, Lalande was a member of a party led by Jesuit Isaac Jogues as an envoy to the Mohawk lands to protect the precarious peace of the time. However, Mohawk attitudes towards this peace had soured during the men's journey, and a Mohawk party attacked them on route.

They were taken to the Mohawk village of Ossernenon (9 miles/14 km west of the current site of Auriesville, New York). The moderate Turtle and Wolf clans ruled they should be set free but, angered by this, members of the Bear clan killed Jogues on October 18. The next day, they killed Lalande when he attempted to recover the body of Father Jogues from the path of the village.

Jean de Lalande was beatified by Pope Pius XI on June 21, 1925, and canonized on June 29, 1930. His feast day is October 19 in the US and September 26th in Canada.

== Legacy ==
At Fordham University's Rose Hill Campus in the Bronx, New York, a freshman dormitory—Martyrs' Court—has three sections, which are named for the three U.S. martyr-saints: Jean Lalande, René Goupil, and Isaac Jogues.

Jean de Lalande is the patron saint of the Saint John LaLande Catholic Parish in Blue Springs, Missouri. A seven-foot-tall limestone statue of St. Jean Lalande, carved by Fritz Carpenter of the Stefan Mittler Monument Company in Madison, Wisconsin, stands outside the church. A second wooden statue depicting Jean Lalande dressed in buckskin was commissioned from Studio Demetz in Ortisei, Italy, and dedicated on May 18, 2013, in honor of the parish's seventy-fifth anniversary.

Jean de Lalande also has special meaning to the Catholic youth camp Camp Ondessonk, which honors the North American martyrs and their Native American friends.
