= René Goupil =

French Jesuit lay brother, missionary and martyr (1608–1642)

Saint René Goupil SJ
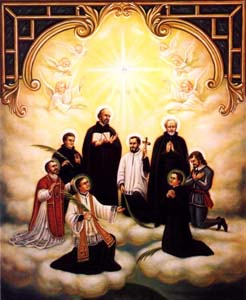
- North American Martyrs

Martyr
- Born: 15 May 1608; Saint-Martin-du-Bois, Anjou, Kingdom of France
- Died: 29 September 1642 (aged 34); Ossernenon, Haudenosauneega
- Venerated in: Roman Catholic Church (Canada, United States)
- Beatified: 21 June 1925, Vatican City by Pope Pius XI
- Canonized: 29 June 1930, Vatican City, by Pope Pius XI
- Major shrine: National Shrine of the North American Martyrs, Auriesville, New York, US
- Feast: 26 September (Canada); 19 October (United States)

René Goupil, SJ (15 May 1608 – 29 September 1642), was a French Jesuit lay missionary (French: donné, "given" or "one who offers himself") who became a lay brother of the Society of Jesus shortly before his death. He was the first of the eight North American Martyrs of the Roman Catholic Church to receive the crown of martyrdom and the first canonized Catholic martyr in North America.

== Life ==
Goupil was baptized in St-Martin-du-Bois, near Angers, in the ancient province of Anjou, on 15 May 1608, the son of Hippolite Goupil and Luce Provost. He was working as a surgeon in Orléans before entering the novitiate of the Society of Jesus (Jesuits) in Paris on 16 March 1639. He had to leave the novitiate due to deafness.

Goupil volunteered to serve as a lay missionary working to assist the Jesuit Fathers. In 1640 he arrived in New France. From 1640 to 1642, he served at the Saint-Joseph de Sillery Mission, near Quebec, where he was charged with caring for the sick and wounded at the hospital. His work primarily involved wound dressings and bloodlettings.

In 1642 Goupil traveled to the Wendat (Huron) missions with about forty other persons, including several Wendat chiefs and Jesuit Father Isaac Jogues. They were captured by the Mohawk, taken to their easternmost village of Ossernenon (about 9 miles west of present-day Auriesville, New York), and tortured. After teaching a Mohawk boy the sign of the cross, Goupil was killed on the Feast of St. Michael the Archangel, 29 September 1642, by a blow to the head with a tomahawk. He died uttering the Holy Name of Jesus, as he had practiced in case of martyrdom. Fr. Jogues was present and gave Goupil absolution before expiring. Before being martyred, Goupil had professed religious vows as a Jesuit lay brother before Fr. Jogues. Many of the 24 Wendat accompanying Goupil were baptized Catholic converts. Traditional enemies of the Mohawk, they were slowly tortured per Haudenosaunee ritual before being killed.

== Veneration ==
Goupil is venerated as the first Jesuit martyr of Canada and one of three martyrs of the present United States territory. He was canonized on 29 June 1930 by Pope Pius XI along with the seven other Canadian Martyrs or "North American Martyrs." He is the patron saint of anesthetists.

At Fordham University's Rose Hill Campus in the Bronx, New York, a freshman dormitory—Martyrs' Court—has three sections, which are named for the three US martyr-saints: René Goupil, Isaac Jogues, and Jean Lalande. Goupil is also honored at the Catholic youth camp Camp Ondessonk, where a unit is named after him.

== See also ==
- Jesuit missions in Canada
- Sainte-Marie among the Hurons
- List of U.S. saints
- Roman Catholicism in the United States#American Catholic Servants of God, Venerables, Beatified, and Saints
- Christian martyrs
