= Jean Pierron =

French missionary

Jean Pierron (born at Dun-sur-Meuse, France, 28 September 1631; date and place of death unknown) was a French Jesuit missionary to New France (Canada).

== Life ==
He entered the Jesuit novitiate at Nancy, 21 November 1650. After studying at Pont-à-Mousson, he became an instructor at Reims and Verdun. He completed the curriculum in 1665 and spent two years more as an instructor at Metz.

On his arrival in Canada in June, 1667, he was sent to the mission of Sainte-Marie, which ministered primarily to the Huron people, an Iroquoian-speaking group. In a letter written to friends in France the same year, Oierron described his impressions of the country, the characteristics and customs of the Native Americans, and expressed an admiration for the Iroquoian Huron language, which reminded him of Greek. He arrived at Tionontoguen, one of the three principal villages of the Mohawk Nation, on 7 October 1668, where he replaced Jacques Frémin as missionary. These people were one of the most flourishing of the five Iroquois nations: warriors, and difficult to convert.

Pierron made use of pictures which he painted in order to express his teachings in a way the Mohawk could grasp. He invented a game by means of which the Indians learned the doctrines and devotions of the Catholic Church. He taught the children to read and write.

Returning north, Pierron spent one winter in Acadia to ascertain whether it would be possible to re-establish the missions, which had been expelled in 1655. He also travelled through New England, Maryland (which at that time had a Catholic governor, Charles Calvert, 3rd Baron Baltimore, and a policy of religious tolerance), and Virginia. Returning to the Iroquois, he worked among them until 1677 and returned to France the following year. He is often credited with the conversion of St. Kateri Tekakwitha.
