= North American Martyrs Parish =

Coordinates: 47°47′18″N 122°21′58″W

- North American Martyrs Parish
- Location: 9924 232nd St SW; Edmonds, Washington
- Country: United States
- Denomination: Catholic
- Tradition: Traditional Catholic
- Religious order: Priestly Fraternity of Saint Peter
- Website: northamericanmartyrs.org

History
- Status: Parish
- Founded: 5 October 2008
- Founder(s): Fr. Gerard Saguto, FSSP
- Consecrated: 23 November 2019

Administration
- Archdiocese: Seattle
- Deanery: Snohomish

Clergy
- Archbishop: Most Rev. Paul D. Etienne
- Vicar(s): Fr. Brian Myers, FSSP
- Pastor(s): Fr. John Shannon, FSSP

North American Martyrs Parish is a Roman Catholic parish in Edmonds, Washington, served by the Priestly Fraternity of St. Peter (FSSP). The FSSP offers the Mass according to the form that was in use before the liturgical reforms of the Second Vatican Council in the 1960s. Following the publication of Pope Benedict XVI's motu proprio Summorum Pontificum in 2007, North American Martyrs Catholic Church became the first Tridentine Mass parish in Seattle to be directly supported by the Archdiocese of Seattle since Vatican II. Established as a quasi-parish, it was elevated to parish status in 2015. The parish is named after the North American Martyrs, eight Jesuit missionaries martyred in the mid-17th century.

== History ==
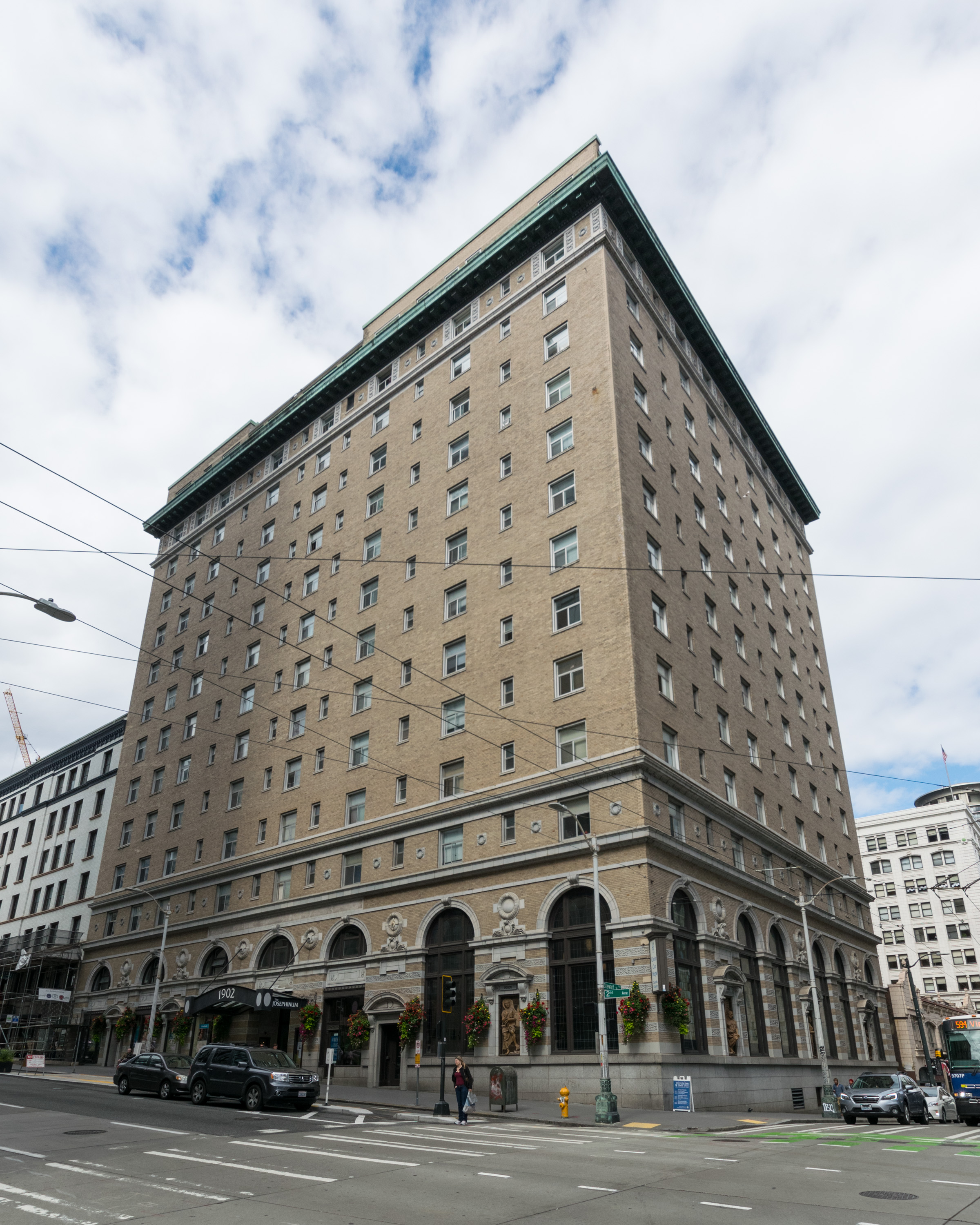
The Josephinum, now Christ Our Hope Parish, previously the site of Seattle's weekly Latin Mass from 2001 to 2008

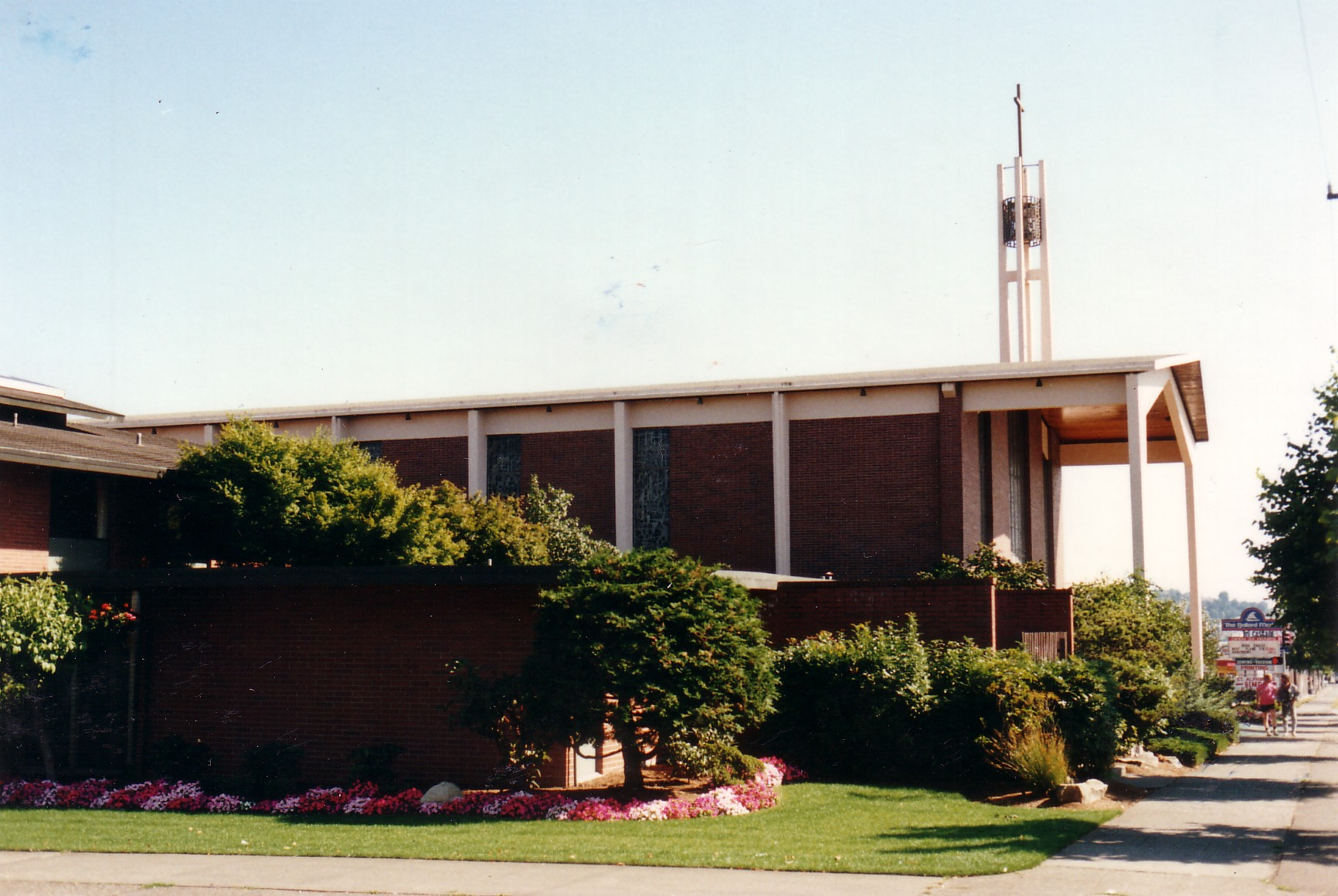
St. Alphonsus Church in Ballard, Seattle, which hosted North American Martyrs Parish from 2008 to 2019

Before the arrival of the Priestly Fraternity of Saint Peter in Seattle in 2008, the traditional Catholic community in Seattle was served by Father James Reichmann, SJ, a Seattle University professor who offered a weekly Latin mass in the St. Joseph Chapel at the Josephinum in Downtown Seattle. After the traditional Catholic community moved to Ballard, Christ Our Hope Parish was established at the Josephinum, focusing on inner-city outreach.

On September 28, 2008, Archbishop Brunett invited the FSSP to Seattle and established a quasi-parish under the patronage of the North American Martyrs and placed the community under the leadership of Father Gerard Saguto, FSSP. The following year, on the patronal feast of North American Martyrs, Archbishop Brunett visited for the first pontifical high mass celebrated in the Archdiocese of Seattle in over 40 years.

From 2008 to 2019, North American Martyrs offered most Masses at St. Alphonsus Church in Seattle's Ballard neighborhood, with a weekly mass at Holyrood Cemetery in Shoreline and Holy Week liturgies at the Bastyr University Chapel (formerly St. Thomas Seminary) in Kenmore.

On September 30, 2018, the parish celebrated its tenth anniversary with a Solemn Mass with Archbishop Sartain in attendance. During his homily, Archbishop Sartain remarked, "The Church gives us a beautiful liturgy, with fitting prayers and readings, to remind us that each of us is called to be a witness — literally a martyr, in Greek — by steadfastly holding on to our faith in Jesus in His holy Church."

In July 2019, Father Reichmann died and days later the parish purchased the property and building of a defunct Lutheran church in Edmonds, Washington, which became its permanent home in November 2019. This is the first time in the parish's eleven-year history that it has had its own church building. On November 23, 2019, Archbishop Paul D. Etienne blessed the new church. Since 1977, Edmonds has also been the home of another Latin mass community, Corpus Christi Chapel, operated by the Society of Saint Pius X outside the authority of the Archdiocese of Seattle.

Since the reduction of Latin mass churches under Traditionis custodes in 2021, North American Martyrs is one of two parishes in the Archdiocese of Seattle in which the Latin mass is permitted. The other parish is Saint Joseph Parish in Tacoma, Washington, also staffed by the FSSP.

Its current pastor is Fr. John Shannon, FSSP.
