= Isaac Jogues =

French missionary and martyr (1607–1646)

Saint Isaac Jogues SJ
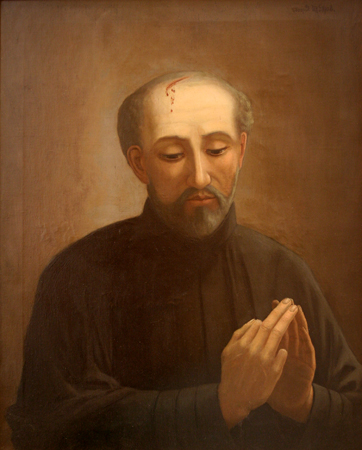
- Portrait by Donald Guthrie McNab, 1895

Martyr
- Born: 10 January 1607; Orléans, Orléanais, Kingdom of France
- Died: 18 October 1646 (aged 39); Ossernenon, Haudenosauneega
- Venerated in: Catholic Church (Canada and the United States)
- Beatified: 21 June 1925, Rome, Italy, by Pope Pius XI
- Canonized: 29 June 1930, Vatican City by Pope Pius XI
- Major shrine: National Shrine of the North American Martyrs, Auriesville, New York, United States
- Feast: 19 October (General Roman Calendar), 26 September (1962 Calendar, Canada)

Isaac Jogues SJ (10 January 1607 – 18 October 1646) was a French missionary and martyr who traveled and worked among the Haudenosaunee, Wendat (Huron), and other Native populations in North America. He was the first European to name Lake George, calling it Lac du Saint Sacrement (Lake of the Blessed Sacrament). In 1646, Jogues was martyred by the Mohawk at their village of Ossernenon, near the Mohawk River.

Jogues, Jean de Brébeuf and six other martyred missionaries, all Jesuit priests or laypeople associated with them, were canonized by the Catholic Church in 1930; they are known as the Canadian Martyrs, or the North American Martyrs. A shrine was built in their honor at Auriesville, New York, formerly believed to be the location of the Mohawk village. Their feast day is celebrated on 19 October in the General Roman Calendar and 26 September in Canada.

== Early life and education ==
Isaac Jogues was born to Laurent Jogues and Françoise de Sainte-Mesmin on 10 January 1607. He was born in Orléans, France, into a bourgeois family, where he was the fifth of nine children. He was educated at home until the age of ten, at which point he began attending Jesuit schools. In 1624, at the age of seventeen, he entered the Jesuit novitiate at Rouen in Northern France. Here, his master of novices was Louis Lallemant. The Jesuit community had a strong missionary spirit, beginning in 1625 with their first mission to New France, including missionary pioneers, Énemond Massé, and later, Jean de Brébeuf. Lallement had two brothers and a nephew serving as missionaries in the colony of New France. These Jesuit missionaries inspired Jogues, and he aspired to follow in their footsteps.

Jogues professed simple vows in 1626, and went to study philosophy at the royal college of La Flèche. In 1629, he taught humanities to boys in Rouen. In 1633, Jogues was sent to the Collège de Clermont in Paris to pursue his studies in theology. In 1636, he was ordained a priest at Clermont.

== Early missions ==
In 1636 missionary fathers Brébeuf, Charles Lallemant and Massé returned from New France. They told Jogues of the hardships, treacheries, and tortures which ordinarily awaited missionaries in New France. Their accounts however, increased Jogues's desire to "devote himself to labour there for the conversion and welfare of the natives". Soon after Jogues was ordained, he accepted service in the missions and embarked to New France with several other missionaries, among them Charles Garnier. Jogues was assigned as a missionary to the Wendat (Huron) and Algonquian peoples; both were allies of the French in New France.

Jogues sailed from France on 8 April 1636, and eight weeks later, his ship dropped anchor in the Baie des Chaleurs. Jogues arrived in Quebec City only several weeks later, on 2 July. On arrival, Jogues wrote to his mother: "I do not know it is to enter Heaven, but this I know—that it would be difficult to experience in this world a joy more excessive and more overflowing than I felt in setting foot in the New World, and celebrating my first Mass on the day of Visitation."

Jogues joined Jean de Brébeuf, the superior of the Jesuit mission, at their settlement on Lake Huron, the village of St-Joseph (Ihonatiria), on 11 September. Upon his arrival, Jogues was stricken by fever. Soon after that, a similar epidemic broke out among other Jesuits and the native people. Due to recurring epidemics, the Wendat blamed the "Black Coats", as they called the Jesuits, threatening to kill them all. Father Brébeuf conciliated them, and by the following year, relations had improved as evidenced by one of his reports: "We are gladly heard, and there is scarcely a village that has not invited us to go to it... And at last, it is understood from our whole conduct that we have not come to buy skins or to carry on any traffic, but solely to teach them and to procure them their souls' health."

For six years, Jogues lived in the village of St-Joseph and learned the Wendat's ways and language. The missionaries "accommodated themselves to the customs and food" of the Wendat as much as possible to show them that they intended to share their life. Gradually, the native people began to accept Jogues. This did not last long, however, as there were some native people who had been "among the English and Dutch settlers to the south" who spread reports that the missionaries brought "calamity wherever they went and that they had in consequence been driven out of Europe."

Jogues traveled with Garnier to the Petun, a native band located in modern-day southern Ontario, who were also known as the Tobacco Nation for their main commodity crop. The natives of the village were so uninviting to the missionaries that the fathers thought it would be impossible to do any missionary work among them. The rumors that had encircled them spread to the village and they quickly discovered that their cause was just as hopeless as in St-Joseph. They traveled from village to village, until after a couple of months, they decided that they could not continue their missionary work. Their luck changed however, when in 1639 the new superior of the Jesuit mission, Father Jérôme Lalemant, entrusted the building of Fort Sainte-Marie to Jogues.

In September 1641, Jogues and Charles Raymbault went into the territory of the Saulteurs (Oijbwe). Some two thousand natives welcomed them upon their arrival. Jogues settled down to the duties of a resident missioner at Sainte-Marie for some time.

== Capture by the Haudenosaunee ==
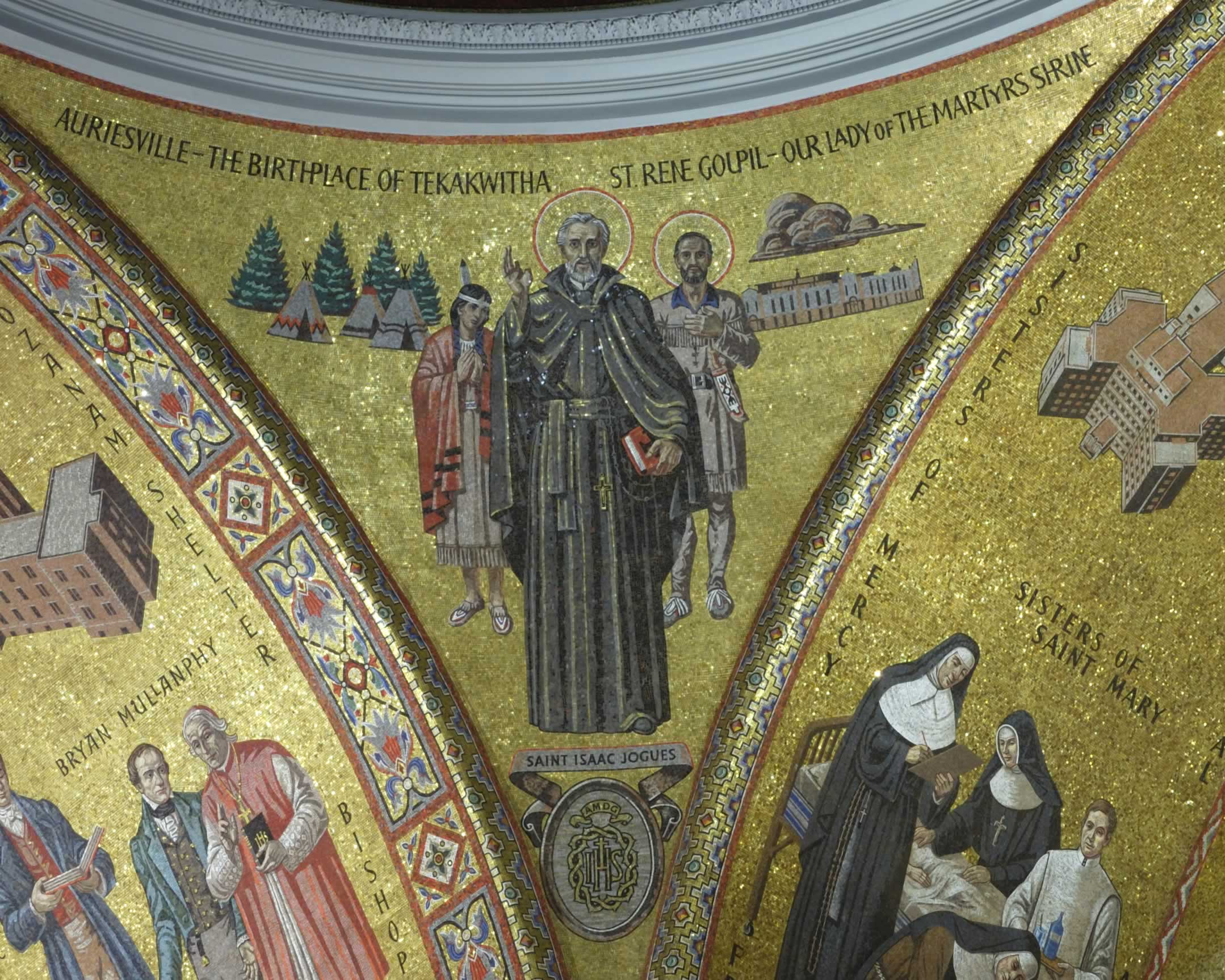
Mosaic of Jogues in the Cathedral Basilica of Saint Louis

On 3 August 1642, Jogues, Guillaume Couture, René Goupil, and a group of Christian Wendat were heading back from Quebec City when they were waylaid by a war party of the Mohawk Nation, part of the Haudenosaunee Confederacy. Jogues allegedly hid in reeds and bushes but decided to leave his hiding place to join the prisoners so that he could comfort them and ensure that their faith in Christianity remained strong. Shortly after that, and in retaliation for comforting a tortured Couture, the Mohawk beat Jogues with sticks, tore out his fingernails, then gnawed the ends of his fingers until finger bones were visible. The war party then took their captives on a journey to a Mohawk village. The villagers marched them through a gauntlet, consisting of rows of Mohawk armed with rods and sticks, beating the prisoners walking in single-file. Afterward, they forced the prisoners onto an elevated platform where they were mocked. A captive Algonquin woman then cut off Jogues's thumb. At night, the prisoners were tied spread-eagle in a cabin. Children threw burning coals onto their bodies. Three days later, Jogues and the other prisoners were marched from one village to another, where the Haudenosaunee flogged them in gauntlets and jabbed sticks into their wounds and sores. At the third village, Jogues was hung from a wooden plank and nearly lost consciousness until an Haudenosaunee had pity on him and cut him free. Throughout his captivity, Jogues comforted, baptized, heard confession from, and absolved the other prisoners.

Hearing of their capture, Arent van Curler, commis of Rensselaerswyck, visited the "first castle" and attempted to ransom them. Van Curler was unsuccessful, but was able to elicit a promise not to kill the captives. Instead of being put to death or integrated into a Mohawk family, Jogues remained a captive at large. Perpetually malnourished and inadequately dressed for the harsh winters, he spent his days gathering wood, praying, and proselytizing his captors. Seeking solace in his faith, Jogues prayed so intensely that he had visions: in one, he suddenly appeared in a bookstore covered in crosses and bought a book that reminded him that, to enter into Heaven, it was necessary to experience many tribulations. His captivity dragged on, lasting about a year, during which he experienced severe malnourishment and exposure to the cold. During this period, some noteworthy incidents were when he saved the life of a pregnant woman that had fallen into a deep, fast-flowing creek during the winter and when he baptized the Haudenosaunee man who had freed him from the wooden torture device.

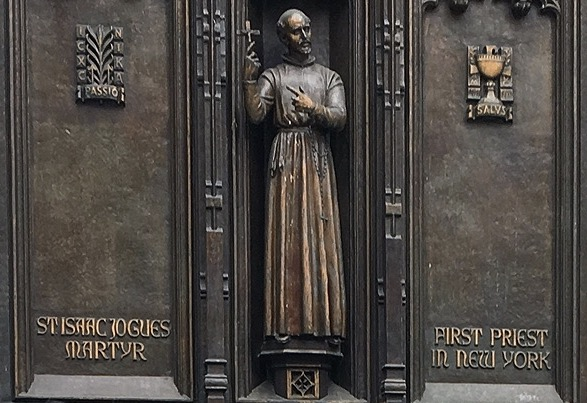
Sculpture of Jogues on a door to St. Patrick's Cathedral in New York City

In the autumn of 1643, the Mohawk were persuaded to bring the priest with them when they came to Beverwijck to trade. Once there, van Curler helped Jogues escape, hiding him in his barn until a deal could be reached. The Frenchman boarded a ship to take him downriver. Reformed minister Johannes Megapolensis accompanied him to New Amsterdam, where Jogues stayed with the minister while waiting for a ship to take him to France. Jogues was the first Catholic priest to visit Manhattan Island.

== Return to France ==
Pope Urban VIII considered Jogues a "living martyr" and gave him dispensation to say Mass with his mutilated hand. Under Catholic Church law of the time, the Eucharist could not be touched with any fingers but the thumb and forefinger. Jogues was unable to follow this law after losing two fingers while in Haudenosaunee captivity, resulting in the requirement for dispensation by the pope. Jogues visited his mother in Orléans, but was eager to return to the missions. Jogues experienced regret over his time in captivity, and a longing for martyrdom that motivated his return to New France in 1644 after a year and a half in France, first to Quebec, followed by a trip to Wendake.

== Return to New France and death ==
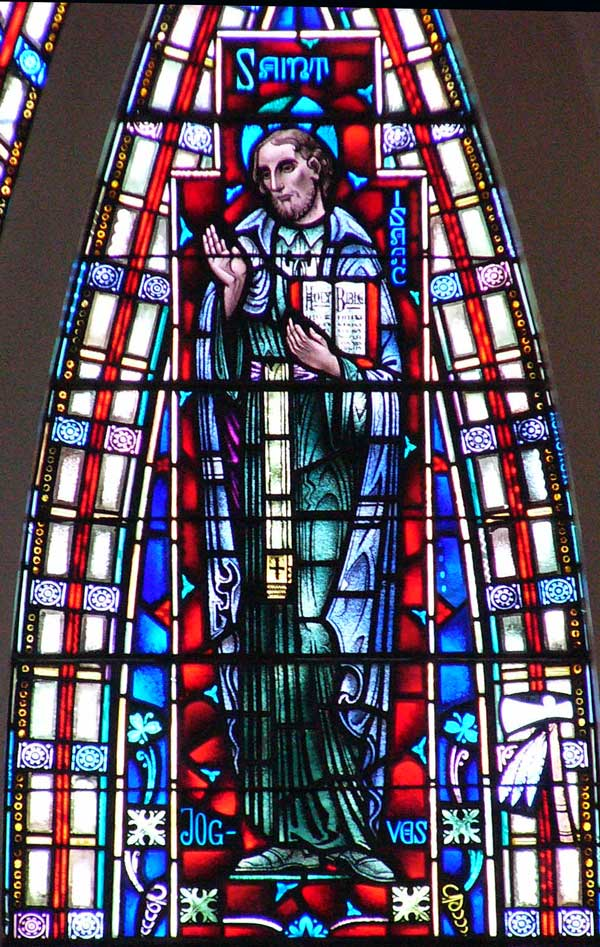
Jogues, along with the other seven Canadian Martyrs, on a stained-glass window in St. John's Church in Omaha, Nebraska

In the spring of 1646, Jogues returned to Haudenosaunee territory, along with Jean de Lalande, to act as the French ambassador to the Mohawk. His ambassadorship was intended to maintain the tentative peace reached in 1645 between the Haudenosaunee and the French, the Wendat and the Algonquin. This was done to ensure a safe passage for trade and travel.

Jogues and Lalande were met with hesitation upon arrival, as some Mohawk regarded missionaries as evil practitioners of foreign magic. The Europeans transmitted European diseases, such as smallpox and measles, that spread among Native Americans. These diseases resulted in high fatality rates among the Mohawk, who lacked immunity to the new diseases. When the Mohawk suffered yet another outbreak of infectious disease and crop failure at Ossernenon, they blamed these unfortunate events on Catholic paraphernalia left behind by the Jesuits, which the Mohawks perceived as magically harmful. Additionally, as a result of his previous experience on the territory, Jogues demonstrated an uncanny knowledge of the territory, which the Mohawks perceived as threatening.

On 18 October 1646, the Mohawks killed Jogues with a tomahawk; they killed Lalande the next day. They threw the missionaries' bodies into the Mohawk River. The killing seems to have been the work of an anti-French faction within the Mohawk community.

Native allies of the French captured Jogues's killer in 1647 and condemned him to death. While awaiting his execution, the man was baptized and given the Christian name of Father Isaac Jogues. His death represented a secondary martyring of Isaac Jogues.

== Attitudes towards martyrdom ==
Jogues's refusal to escape and how he embraced torture demonstrate selflessness that, like many other Jesuits in New France, he believed that being martyred would mean partaking in the torment that Jesus had endured on the cross. This would indicate his acceptance "into the pantheon of heroes whose physical and spiritual strength had been equal to the cruel persecutions inflicted on the primitive church." Jogues is quoted as saying: "He [Jesus] was making us share his sufferings, and admitting us to participate in his crosses."

At another point, Jogues speaks of, "The procession [of torture victims] beginning to enter this narrow way of Paradise... it was indeed then that I could say with my Lord and master, Supra dorsum meum fabricaverunt peccatores,—'Sinners have built and left monuments and marks of their rage upon my back.'" Jogues regarded his torture, and the death he thought would follow, as allowing him to imitate, and thus participate in, the passion of Jesus.

== Veneration and legacy ==
Jogues was canonized on 29 June 1930 by Pope Pius XI along with seven other Canadian Martyrs. His feast day is celebrated on 19 October in the General Roman Calendar, and on 26 September in Canada. Jogues and his companions are patron saints of North America.

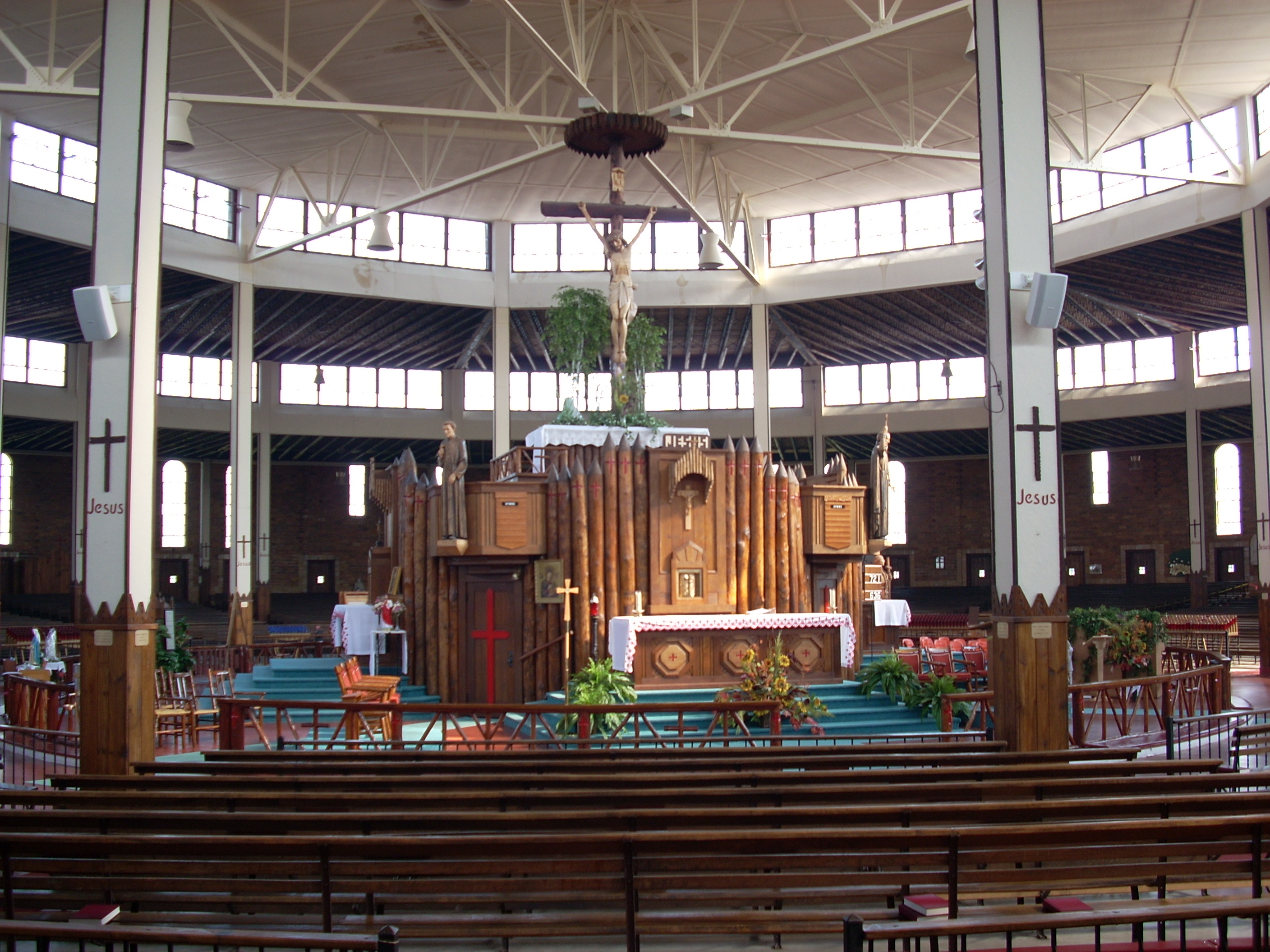
Interior of the Shrine of the North American Martyrs

There are several buildings and monuments dedicated to Jogues. The largest of these monuments is the Shrine of the North American Martyrs, built in Auriesville, New York in 1930. It honors Jogues, René Goupil, Jean de Lalande, and Kateri Tekakwitha. The shrine also honors Jean de Brébeuf and five of his companions killed in Canada in 1648 and 1649.

There is also the Martyr's Shrine located in Midland, Ontario, Canada, which honors the Canadian Martyrs (another term for the North American Martyrs).

A seasonal chapel on the east shore of Saratoga Lake, New York is named after Jogues. A statue of Jogues stands in front of the main entrance to the chapel that faces the lake. While he was being taken into captivity, Jogues is said to have been the first European to see this lake.

Fordham University, a Jesuit university in New York, has a dormitory building at its Rose Hill Campus named Martyrs' Court. The three wings of the building are named after Jogues, Goupil, and de Lalande.

Another statue of Jogues was erected in 1939, in the village of Lake George, in the Battlefield Park by the lake.

Camp Ondessonk, a Catholic youth camp located in Ozark, Illinois, is named after Jogues's Mohawk name. The living quarters for campers are named for the North American Martyrs and others influenced by their ministry, including Tekakwitha, de Brébeuf, Noël Chabanel, Antoine Daniel, Garnier, Goupil, de Lalande, and Gabriel Lalemant.

== Bibliography ==
- Anderson, Emma (2013). The Death and Afterlife of the North American Martyrs. Cambridge, Massachusetts: Harvard University Press. p. 25. ISBN 978-0-674-05118-8.
- Scott, Martin (1927). Isaac Jogues: Missioner and Martyr. New York: P. J. Kenedy & Sons. p. 45. OCLC 2104827.
- Talbot, Francis (2002) [1935]. Saint Among Savages: The Life of Saint Isaac Jogues. San Francisco: Ignatius Press. ISBN 0-89870-913-X.
- The Captivity of St. Isaac Jogues. Bristol, PA: Arx Publishing. 2003. ISBN 1-889758-52-3.
- Vann, Joseph, ed. (1953). Lives of Saints. John J. Crawley.
