= Pierre Cholenec =

French Jesuit missionary and biographer

Pierre Cholenec (June 29, 1641 – October 30, 1723) was a French Jesuit missionary and biographer in New France. He ministered to First Nations in present-day Canada, particularly at the village of Kahnawake south of Montreal. He served as superior of the Jesuit residence in Montréal. He is known for writing multiple biographies about Kateri Tekakwitha which contributed to her canonization in 2012 by Pope Benedict XVI.

== Early life and education ==
Cholenec was born in Saint-Pol-de-Léon, Diocese of Saint-Pol-de-Léon, Finistère, in the west of Brittany. He attended Catholic schools.

After completing his education in seminary, Cholenec entered the Society of Jesus in Paris, 8 October 1659 at the age of eighteen. He taught in the colleges of Moulins, Allier and Eu, Seine-Maritime from 1661 to 1670. Also during that period, he studied philosophy for three years at Collège Henri IV in La Flèche. After four years more of theology study in Paris at Collège de Clermont, Cholenec departed for Canada in August 1674. In Montreal he learned the Mohawk and Algonquian languages before starting to work with the natives.

Two years into his missionary work, Cholenec was a high ranking Jesuit as a "professed father."

== Missionary ==
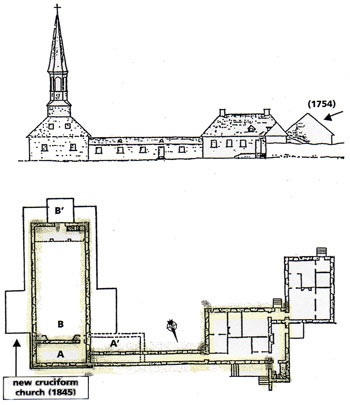
The first stone Church of Saint Francis Xavier, Kahnawake 1716 (Pierre Cholenec was Superior of the Mission from 1711 to 1722), seen from the river (drawing by Captain R. Piper of the Royal Engineers, 1830)

From 1683 to 1688 Father Cholenec performed mission work at Lorette, a Jesuit colony now known as L'Ancienne-Lorette, Quebec. For many years, Cholenec was stationed among the Praying Iroquois at St. Francis Xavier du Sault, a Jesuit mission village also known as Kahnawake, located south of Montreal along the St. Lawrence River. This is where Kateri Tekakwitha, a converted Mohawk woman, came in the fall of 1677 where Cholenec was her confessor. She became part of a group of women in the village who were very devout and regularly practiced mortification of the flesh. The natives who practiced mortification of the flesh caused the Jesuit priests to worry. Cholenec brought European self-torture devices to Kahnawake, such as whips and iron belts, in order to regulate the rituals. However, some of the most devout individuals simply began using the instruments Cholenec introduced while also practicing the indigenous methods of self-torture.

Cholenec wrote multiple letters regarding the Iroquois Mission at St. Francis Xavier du Sault, which are found in The Jesuit Relations and Allied Documents.

Kahnawake became a Mohawk reserve, as did Akwesasne, founded by Mohawk families upriver on the St. Lawrence in 1745.

=== Contribution to Kateri Tekakwitha's Canonization ===
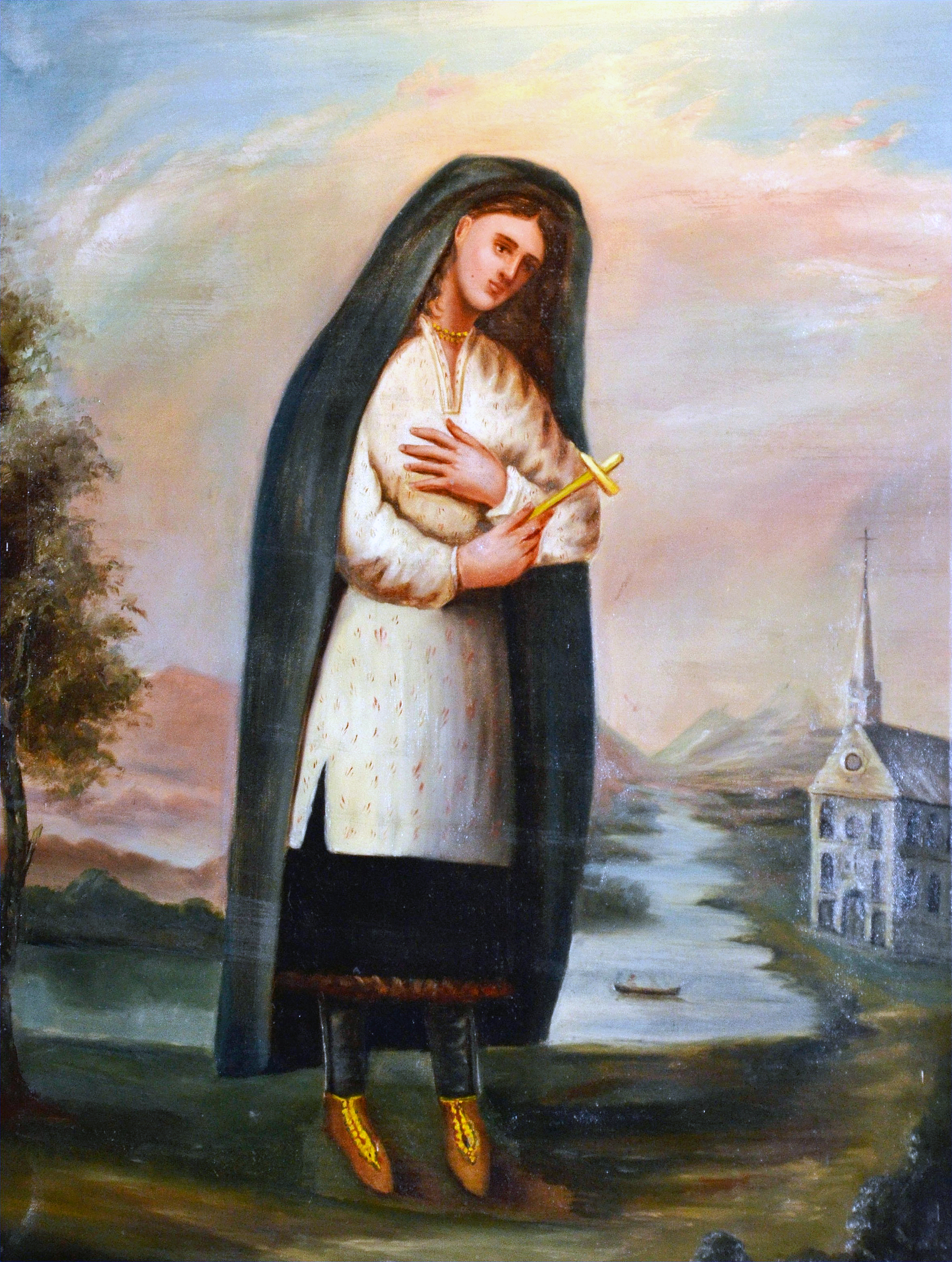
Portrait of Kateri Tekakwitha completed by Father Claude Chauchetière in 1690

On Easter Sunday in 1677 at the age of 19, Tekakwitha was baptized as Catherine, after Saint Catherine of Siena. Baptismal names in Christian traditions link the convert to ancestors, often the converts patron saint. The patron saint is viewed as a protector and spiritual model.

Following the death of Kateri Tekakwitha in April 1680, another Jesuit Missionary Claude Chauchetiere, and eventually Cholenec, came to believe she was a saint. Both Cholenec and Chauchetiere wrote of many extraordinary circumstances after she died, somewhat differing in their respective accounts. An excerpt from Cholenec reads:

“This face, so marked and swarthy, suddenly changed about a quarter of an hour after her death, and became in a moment so beautiful and so white that I observed it immediately (for I was praying beside her) and cried out. . . . I admit openly that the first thought that came to me was that Catherine at that moment might have entered into heaven, reflecting in her chaste body a small ray of the glory of which her soul had taken possession.”

There was a disagreement between Cholenec and Chauchetiere regarding the location Tekakwitha was to be buried. Chauchetiere wanted her to be buried in the church, which was only allowed for the elites of Catholic Europe. Cholenec instead allowed her to be buried in the cemetery. While Chauchetiere was already starting to believe Kateri was a saint, Cholenec had doubts, and considered the possibility that the things he had witnessed were of the devil. Not long after Tekakwitha's death, Cholenec said she was "the most fervent" and wrote about a light that surrounded her when she engaged in mortification of the flesh. Two weeks after Tekakwitha died, Cholenec wrote a letter describing Tekakwitha's many virtues and pious nature. Cholenec also wrote multiple biographies (or more accurately, hagiographies) regarding Tekakwitha.

Father Cholenec completed an account of her life in 1696. It was published in the Lettres édifiantes (1781) and (1839). A translation is given in Kip, Jesuit Missions (New York, 1846). This is an abridgment of a more extended biography, which is preserved in the archives of the Jesuits in Montreal.

Cholenec also wrote about miracles and healings that had occurred in Tekakwitha's name. One writing from Cholenec reads: "We have noticed that she usually heals the soul as well as the body of those who need such a double cure, even if they do not ask for it."

With regards to Cholenec's biographical accounts about Tekakwitha, not only did he write of her self mortification, the extraordinary events surrounding her death, the miracles that occurred in her name, but also her decision not to marry. Cholenec also exalted Tekakwitha because of her virgin status, and added the subtitle of "The First Iroquois Virgin" to his 1696 account "Life of Catherine Tegakouita."

== Later years ==
Cholenec was appointed as the superior of the Jesuit residence in Montreal. He died there at the age of 82.
