= Auriesville, New York =

- Hamlet
- Location within New York Location within the United States
- Coordinates: 42°55′46″N 74°18′59″W
- Country: United States
- State: New York
- County: Montgomery
- Town: Glen
- Elevation: 312 ft (95 m)
- Time zone: UTC-5 (Eastern (EST))
  - Summer (DST): UTC-4 (EDT)
- ZIP Code: 12016
- Area code: 518
- GNIS feature ID: 942705

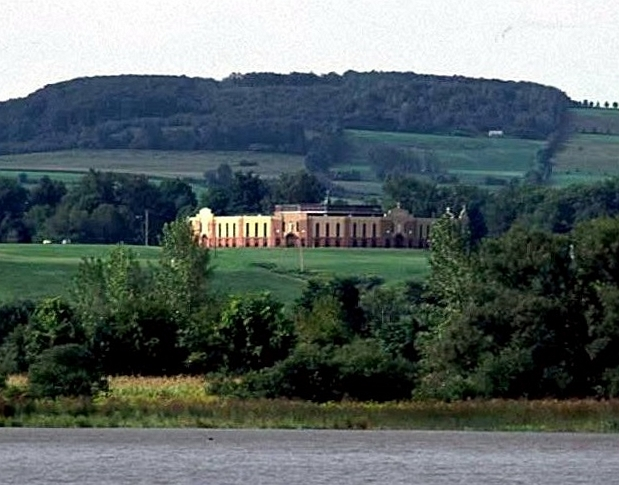
The National Shrine of the North American Martyrs at Auriesville, New York; the Mohawk River is in the foreground.

Auriesville is a hamlet in the northern part of New York State, 41 miles west of Albany, the state capital. Catholic tradition holds that it was the site of Ossernenon (Mohawk: Osserné:non), a Mohawk village where French Jesuits operated a mission from 1667 until 1684, when the Mohawk destroyed it as part of continuing confrontations with French colonists. Auries is said to have been the name of the last Mohawk known to have lived there. Later settlers named the village after him.

Since the late 19th century, a Catholic tradition developed associating Auriesville with the site of the Mohawk village Ossernenon, where Jesuit missionaries were martyred in 1642 and 1646. The National Shrine of the North American Martyrs was built here in 1930 and has added to its grounds. But, according to Dean R. Snow and other late 20th-century archeologists specializing in Native American history, Ossernenon was located about 9 mi (14 km) west on a tributary on the south side of the Mohawk River. Archeologists who have excavated there refer to it as the Bauder site. The association of Auriesville with Ossernenon has not been supported by archeological evidence.

== History ==
Auriesville, located in Montgomery County, has been said to have developed at the presumed site of the Mohawk village known as Ossernenon. But, according to archeologist Dean R. Snow, it was not until the late nineteenth-century that this Catholic tradition developed. It is disproved by archeological evidence discovered by Snow, Donald A. Rumrill, and other 20th-century archeologists who assert that Ossernenon was located approximately nine miles west of Auriesville on a tributary south of the Mohawk River. The archeological site associated with the former village of Ossernenon is known as the Bauder site.

Catholic historians wanted to establish the location of the deaths of three Jesuit Catholics who were martyred in the 1640s by the Mohawk, as well as others held and ritually tortured by the tribe. Ossernenon was also known as the birthplace of Kateri Tekakwitha, whose reputation as a Mohawk virgin had grown since the 17th century. In 2012, she was canonized, with the distinction of being the first Native American so honored. More than 2,000 Native Americans, the majority of them Mohawk, from both the United States and Canada traveled to Rome for the canonization.

Archeologists have identified the Mohawk village of Caughnawaga (also spelled Gandawaga), where Tekakwitha lived during her childhood, as a new village site on the north side of the river, founded in 1659. Caughnawaga was settled at what archeologists refer to as the Freeman site. As was their custom, its Mohawk residents took the name with them also when they moved the village to another site nearby, now known in archeology as the Fox Farm site. Excavations have supported conclusions of Mohawk settlement here. The sites are both to the west of present-day Fonda.

The Jesuits in Nouvelle France (Canada) later developed a mission village known as Caughnawaga and spelled as Kahnawake, reflecting Mohawk pronunciation. The Jesuits founded the mission south of Montreal in 1718 for Mohawk and other Iroquois peoples, and other converts to Catholicism. Most residents were Mohawk. Today, Kahnawake is recognized as a Mohawk Indian reserve within the boundaries of Quebec.

== Commemoration ==
In 1884, Joseph Loyzance, then parish priest of St. Joseph's, Troy, New York, purchased 10 acres (40,000 m^{2}) of land on the hill at Auriesville. A student of the lives of the early missionaries, Loyzance erected a small shrine under the title of Our Lady of Martyrs. He was the first to lead a number of pilgrims to the place, on 15 August of that year. It was the Feast of the Assumption, as well as the anniversary of when Isaac Jogues was first taken as a Mohawk captive to Ossernenon in 1642. Four thousand people went on a pilgrimage from Albany and Troy to Auriesville on that day.

Other Catholic parishes subsequently adopted the practice of visiting Auriesville during the summer. Frequently there were as many as 4,000 to 5,000 people gathered there. Many of the pilgrims would fast for their journey, pray and receive Holy Communion there. The Catholic Church purchased and consecrated more ground to keep the surroundings free from undesirable development. Following the canonization of Jogues in 1930, the church built the National Shrine of the North American Martyrs at this site, recognizing other Jesuit martyrs from the French colonial period. It built a large coliseum-sanctuary on the grounds, with seating for up to 6000 worshipers. The property now includes more than 400 acres (1.6 km^{2}).

While in the 19th century Ossernenon was associated with Auriesville, twentieth-century research has placed it approximately nine miles west of the current hamlet by that name.

== See also ==
- North American Martyrs
- Ossernenon
- Early history of Upstate New York
