= Ossernenon =

Former Mohawk nation town in New York, United States

Ossernenon (Mohawk: Osserné:non) was a town of the Mohawk people in the Mohawk Valley of present-day New York State, United States. The town was destroyed ca. 1666 in a punitive French raid in retribution for the killing of French missionaries, after which its exact location became lost. French Jesuit missionaries Saint René Goupil, Saint Isaac Jogues, and Saint Jean de Lalande, were martyred by the Mohawk at Ossernenon: Goupil in 1642 and Jogues and LaLande in 1646.

== History ==
Ossernenon was located south of the Mohawk River, about nine miles to the west of present-day Auriesville, New York. Taken captive in Canada by Mohawk warriors, Jogues and Goupil were brought as prisoners in 1642 to Ossernenon. They were ritually tortured and then enslaved by the Mohawk. Goupil was killed later in 1642. After several months, Jogues was ransomed by Dutch traders from Fort Orange (Albany), with the aid of Protestant minister Johannes Megapolensis, who had good relations with the Mohawk. Jogues sailed down the Hudson River to return to France by way of New Amsterdam.

In 1644, François-Joseph Bressani was ritually tortured by Mohawk at Ossernenon after being taken captive. Later on, Joseph Poncet also suffered that treatment. Jogues returned to Quebec as a missionary. In late September 1646, he set out for Ossernenon on a peace mission to the Mohawk with Lalande, a young Jesuit lay brother. Jogues was killed on October 18, 1646. Lalande was killed the next day while trying to recover his colleague's body from the village path.

From 1655 to 1658, Father Simon Le Moyne reported traveling a number of times to Ossernenon from Quebec as an ambassador to negotiate peace with the Mohawk. Many Mohawk left Ossernenon, establishing a new village circa 1659, which they called Caughnawaga (Mohawk: Kahnawà꞉ke), on the north side of the Mohawk River. As noted above, archeologists have correlated references to this with evidence found at what are known as the Freeman and Fox Farm sites.

In 1666, the Marquis de Tracy conducted a punitive expedition against the Mohawk, destroying Ossernenon and their two other villages on the south side of the river. The French forced the Mohawk to agree to accept Jesuit missionaries. In the next years, the French established a permanent Jesuit mission at what developed as Auriesville. Father Boniface, James de Lamberville, Jacques Frémin, Bruyas, Jean Pierron and others laboured here until 1684, when the Mohawk destroyed the mission.

== Location ==
The exact location of Ossernenon, closely associated with the founding of Catholicism in present-day New York, was debated by scholars. After its destruction by French forces in the 1660s, the site gradually was lost. Nineteenth-century historians, such as John Gilmary Shea and Gen. J. S. Clarke of Auburn, disagreed over the location. They concluded that the present Auriesville is where Father Jogues and his companions were martyred in the 1640s. They based this on documentation describing Ossernenon as being on the south side of the Mohawk and west of Schoharie Creek, as is Auriesville. They thought they established it from contemporary maps, and from the letters of Jogues, Bressani, and Poncet.

Joliet had put the village of Ossernenon at the confluence of Schoharie and Mohawk rivers. Jogues described the ravine in which Goupil's body was found, with features which people believed they recognized in the 19th century. Lastly, Jogues gave the distances from the Mohawk villages of Andagaron and Tionontoguen, by which the historians figured the site. As noted above, based on extensive archeological work and analysis of historic documents, late 20th-century ethnohistorians and archeologists disagree with this conclusion. They have established that Ossernenon was located nine miles west of Auriesville at what they call the Bauder site, also on a tributary of the Mohawk river.
