= Jacques Frémin =

French Jesuit missionary

Jacques Frémin (12 March 1628, in Reims – 21 July 1691, in Quebec) was a French Jesuit missionary to New France (Canada).

== Life ==
Frémin entered the Society of Jesus in 1646, and taught for five years at Alençon. He was ordained in 1655 at Moulins. He studied languages and culture to prepare to serve as a missionary. In 1655 he sailed to Canada, where he was assigned to the Onondaga mission. The Onondaga were part of the Haudenosaunee Confederacy and located south of Lake Ontario. He devoted the rest of his life to evangelization. He made a brief trip to France in 1659, and upon his returned served among the Montagnais near Trois-Rivières.

At the invitation of a Cayuga chief he set out, in 1666, for Lake Tiohero, near the present Cayuga. He stayed there a short time. The next year he was sent to revive the mission founded by Father Jogues among the Mohawk Nation. On his way, he founded the first Catholic settlement in Vermont, on Isle La Motte. After settling at Tinnontoguen, the Mohawk capital, he acquired the language and won respect. His chief work seems to have been to attend to the Huron captives who were already Christianized.

In October 1668, Frémin proceeded to the Seneca Indian country. They were engaged in war with the Odawa and the Susquehannock, which prevented his making much progress or many conversions. In August 1669, he left for Onondaga to preside at a general meeting of the missionary priests. Soon he returned to Tinnontoguen to resume his work among the captive Huron.

In 1670, he was recalled to La Prairie, the Christian settlement near Montreal where the converted Indians had been gathered. He improved conditions at the settlement, eliminating the liquor traffic and establishing a regular cycle of prayers. From that time on, with the exception of several voyages to France in the interest of the mission, he devoted himself exclusively to the work of preserving in the Catholic faith those Indians who had been baptized.

Fermin died in Quebec 21 July 1691.

According to J. Monet, "Father Frémin’s intelligence was not great, and his manners lacked refinement, but his courage and good sense were particularly outstanding."
