= Brebeuf College School =

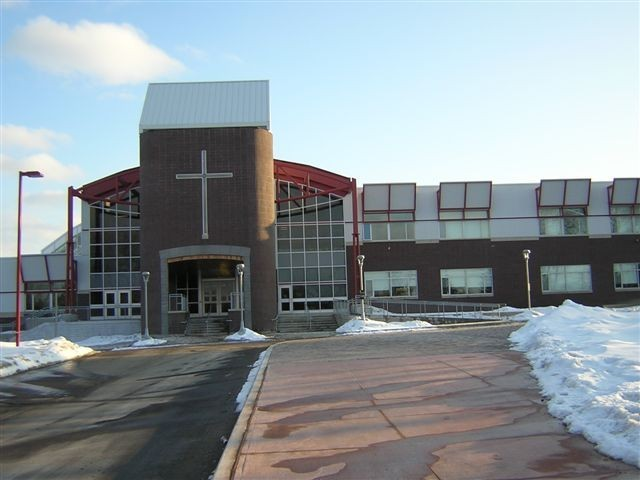

Location
- 211 Steeles Avenue East; Toronto, Ontario, M2M 3Y6; Canada; 43.800206°N 79.402624°W

Information
- School type: Catholic High School
- Motto: Men for Others Studio Gradum Faciant (To Win Merit Through Study)
- Religious affiliations: Roman Catholic; Jesuit (Presentation Brothers)
- Established: 1963
- School board: Toronto Catholic District School Board
- Superintendent: Cristina Fernandes; Area 4
- Area trustee: Maria Rizzo; Ward 5
- School number: 508 / 690961
- Principal: James Tanchez
- Vice principals: Christine Hughes-Butler; Andrew Muia
- Grades: 9-12
- Enrolment: 700 (2021-2022)
- Language: English
- Campus: Suburban (14 acres)
- Colours: Red, white, and black
- Mascot: Redmen (1963–2004); Bullsworth (2004–present)
- Team name: Brebeuf Bulls
- Parish: Blessed Trinity
- Specialist high skills major: Arts and Culture; Health and Wellness; Information and Communications Technology
- Program focus: Advanced Placement; STEAM
- Website: sites.google.com/tcdsb.ca/brebeufcollege

Brebeuf College School (Brebeuf College, BCS, or Brebeuf) is a Roman Catholic all-boys high school in Toronto, Ontario, Canada endorsed by the Jesuits of Canada. Founded by the Jesuits in 1963, it is part of the Toronto Catholic District School Board and associated with the Presentation Brothers since 1984. Brebeuf is the brother school of nearby St. Joseph's Morrow Park Catholic Secondary School.

Students participate in a various activities, including faith and service-related clubs, music and drama productions, and athletic programs at both the intramural and extramural levels. Extended French, Gifted, ESL, and co-operative education programs are available for students with appropriate qualifications. Brebeuf offers an Enriched program that allows students to study advanced material and to develop university-level skills, preparing them to take the AP exam and earn an Advanced Placement university credit while still in high school. The school began offering a Congregated Advanced Placement IT application-based STEAM (Science, Technology, Engineering, Arts, and Mathematics) program in 2020.

The school operates on the semester system and has an enrolment of 958 students in the 2017-18 school year. The majority of students come from Willowdale and northern Scarborough; roughly 20% live in York Region and students travel from as far away as Newmarket, Mississauga, and Pickering to attend the college. Almost 20% of the teaching staff are alumni. The motto of the school is "Studio Gradum Faciant" (To win merit through study).

== History ==
=== St. Jean de Brébeuf ===
The school was named after Saint Jean de Brébeuf, a French Jesuit priest (the priests who founded the school in 1963 were Jesuits of the Upper Canada Province) who first came to Canada in 1625, 17 years after the founding of the country by Champlain's French colonists in 1608. Brebeuf journeyed to the area around what is now Midland, Ontario and preached to the Huron people of that area. In 1649 an Iroquois raid on a Huron village captured de Brébeuf, aged 56, and others; they were ritually tortured and killed. De Brébeuf was canonised as a saint in 1930. In 1954 his grave was discovered by Father Denis Hegarty, S.J. at the present site of Ste.-Marie-among the Hurons, near Midland, with a plaque reading "P. Jean de Brébeuf /brusle par les Iroquois /le 17 de mars l'an/1649" (Father Jean de Brébeuf, burned by the Iroquois, 17 March 1649). De Brebeuf is the patron of Brebeuf College School.

=== Beginnings ===
The school opened with 100 students in grades 9 and 10 in September 1963. Brebeuf's first graduation class in 1966 consisted of 30 students, among them Michael Daoust, who became head of mathematics at Brebeuf.

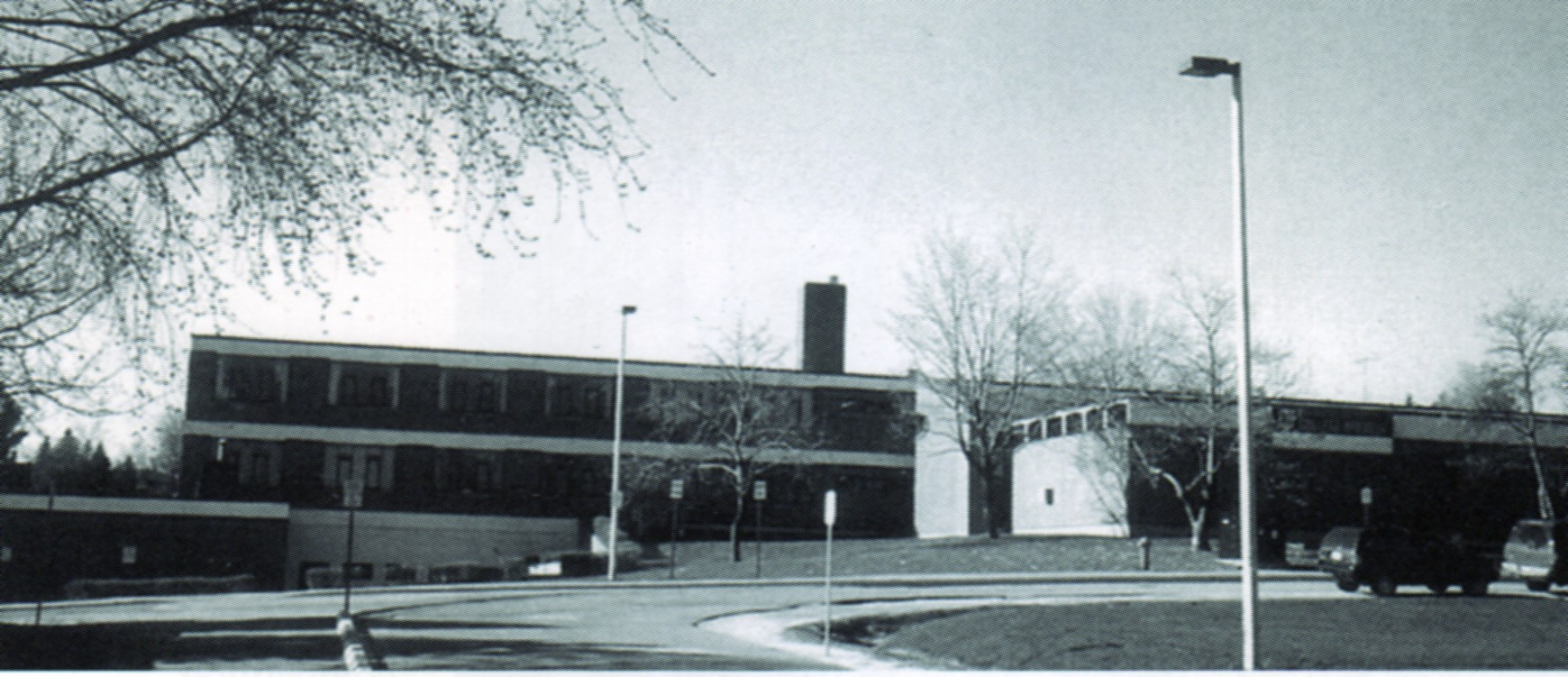
Original Brebeuf College

In 1967, the school entered an agreement with the Metropolitan Separate School Board (now the Toronto Catholic District School Board), whereby grade 9 and 10 students would be under the publicly funded separate school system and grades 11, 12, and 13 would continue as a private school. This arrangement happened at most Catholic high schools in Ontario at the request of the bishops of the province. 74 students graduated, two of whom were Michael Daoust and Dr. Robert Lato, formerly the head of guidance at Brebeuf.

=== Presentation Brothers ===
In May 1983, Father Winston Rye, the Provincial of the Jesuits, announced that the Jesuits were going to give up responsibilities for the operation of Brebeuf College School by June 1984. This decision was made necessary by the steady decline of available manpower. Immediately, Cardinal Gerald Emmett Carter and the staff of the Archdiocese of Toronto began to explore the possibilities to ensure the continual operation of Brebeuf. In February 1984, Cardinal Carter's office announced that the Presentation Brothers were willing to assume responsibility for Brebeuf College, and would officially take over on July 31, 1984. Brother Lawrence Maher FPM was the new Principal until 1996.

The Presentation Brothers of Mary are a religious congregation founded with a single intention—to work for the Christian education and the formation of youth. The Order was founded in 1802 in Ireland by Blessed Edmund Ignatius Rice, a businessman of Waterford. By the age of 40, Rice was noted as a generous layman, particularly concerned with the plight of the poor. After entering a monastery in Europe, he realized that his real vocation lay with the uneducated and poverty-stricken youth of Waterford. In 1802 Edmund Rice gave up his personal wealth, and by 1822 had become the founder of the Presentation Brothers and the Congregation of Christian Brothers. Today the Presentation Brothers operate elementary and secondary schools in the West Indies, Ireland, Ghana, Nigeria, and Canada.

In June 1984, the Ontario Government announced it would begin funding Catholic high schools beyond grade 10 beginning in 1985. In 1987, Brebeuf ceased to be a private school.The school's population grew from approximately 600 to over 1,200 by 1992.

In 2001, the Toronto Catholic District School Board announced funding for a new building to replace Brebeuf's outdated facilities, and invested $23 million CAD. The main architect was Rod Robbie. The new school buildings came into use in 2004.

== Crest and motto ==
Crest from the second chapel

The Brebeuf crest was designed by Father Robert Meagher S.J., Brebeuf's founding principal. It symbolizes the rich heritage and history of Brebeuf.

The black bull is taken from the family coat of arms of St. Jean de Brebeuf.

The cross of St. George and maple leaves are taken from the arms of the Province of Ontario.

The blazing sun forms the arms of the Society of Jesus, which founded the school, and of which Brebeuf was a member. The flames on the circle symbolize the infinite love of Christ, and the little cross, the pinnacle of that love. The Greek letters "iota", "eta," and "sigma" are the first three letters of Jesus's name.

The angel's wings behind the large cross are those of St. Michael, the patron saint of the Archdiocese of Toronto. The five small crosses on the larger cross represent each of the five Canadian Jesuit martyrs (Jean de Brebeuf, Gabriel Lalement, Antoine Daniel, Charles Garnier, and Noel Chabanel).

The Latin motto "Studio Gradum Faciant" translates as "To win merit through study", emphasizing the academic nature of the school.

== Overview ==
=== Religious life ===
The school follows the Catholic Church's sacramental and liturgical calendar. Students take religion courses in each year of school. Each day begins with a community prayer over the public address system and a communion service in the chapel. The Angelus is recited at 10:00 each day. Students participate in a day-retreat as part of their religion class. Kairos (retreats) are offered to students in grade 11. Masses are held throughout the year (Feast of Brebeuf, Thanksgiving, Advent, Feast of Edmund Rice, Closing Mass, etc.) and on every first Friday of the month. Exposition and adoration of the Blessed Sacrament takes place following the first Friday mass.

Students are encouraged to put their faith into action as "men for others" in various charity drives and social justice initiatives. Students and staff organize a social justice symposium annually for Catholic high school students. Its aim is to highlight social injustices in Toronto and around the world and to give students ways of putting their faith into action by fighting injustices.

In 2011 the school instituted the first of its international service and leadership programmes with a trip to Ghana in conjunction with the Presentation Brothers. Since 2012, students and staff have participated in similar trips to St. Lucia, Peru, Grenada, and Ireland.

The school maintains relations with the Jesuits, the school's founding religious order, and the Presentation Brothers, through chaplaincy, masses, guest speakers, retreats, guest speakers, fundraising, and other collaborative ventures.

=== Awards and scholarships ===
The Honour Roll recognizes students who have an overall average of 80% with no marks below 60%. Students who achieve Honour Roll status for every year of high school are inducted into the Blessed Edmund Rice Society, named for the founder of the Presentation Brothers, at Graduation.

There are awards for the highest overall average in each grade and these are named for the college's Jesuit principals:

- Grade 9 - Father Robert Meagher S.J. Award
- Grade 10 - Father Clement Crusoe S.J. Award
- Grade 11 - Father Kenneth Casey S.J. Award
- Grade 12 - Father Winston Rye S.J. Award

In 2012, the school created the Order of St Jean de Brebeuf to recognize members of the school community who exemplify the values and ideals for which Brebeuf College School stands, namely: faith, discipline, integrity, hard work, humility, excellence, success, pursuit of the greater good, friendship, and community, and for always being "Men and Women For Others".

=== Varsity sports ===
Varsity sports include hockey, football, tennis, golf, volleyball, basketball, track and field, cross country, table tennis, badminton, soccer, and indoor soccer.

=== House system ===
In 2010, the school reintroduced a house system. All students are placed in one of six houses named for the Canadian Jesuit martyrs who were contemporaries of St. Jean de Brebeuf. Students participate in a variety of athletic and academic competitions. The house names are:

- St. Isaac Jogues S.J.
- St. Charles Garnier S.J.
- St. Jean de Lalande S.J.
- St. Antoine Daniel S.J.
- St. Noel Chabanel S.J.
- St. Gabriel Lalemant S.J.

=== School media ===
The B newspaper has been published continuously since 1963. Brebeuf Relations is the newsletter sent out 3-4 times per year to the parent community and friends of the school. Alumni B has been published each December for former pupils, starting in 1982. Brebeuf's yearbook, Echon, takes its name from St. Jean de Brebeuf's name in the Huron language, and has been produced annually since 1967.

Brebeuf TV is a closed-circuit television system consisting of eight televisions placed throughout the school. It broadcasts announcements, weather, the house competition leaderboard, video clips produced by the school's media arts and communications technology courses. The system is primarily run by the school's ICT SHSM team.

=== Uniform ===
The school consists of a distinctive black blazer, or black fleece polo top with white dress shirt and grey pants. In the warmer weather, students have the option of wearing a crested golf shirt. The school crest, in the school colours of red, black and white, bears the motto "Studio Gradum Faciant".

== Principals ==
Principal	Previous school	Date started	Date finished	Notes
Father Robert Meagher S.J.		1963	1972	Founding principal of Brebeuf College under the Jesuits
Father Clement Crusoe S.J.		1972	1976	
Father Ken Casey S.J.		1976	1979	
Father Winston Rye S.J.		1979	1984	Last principal under the Jesuits
Brother Lawrence Maher F.P.M.		1984	1996	Only principal under the Presentation Brothers, last principal from a religious order
Joseph Brisbois		1996	2000	First lay principal
Michael Pautler '76		2000	2004	Served as principal under Brebeuf's temporary site at Bathurst Heights Secondary School. Oversaw construction of the new building.
Nicola D'Avella		2004	2008	
Derek Chen		2016	2020	
Linton Soares		2020	2022	
James Tanchez		2022	Present	

== Notable alumni ==
- Joseph Boyden, Giller Award-winning author of Through Black Spruce, Three Day Road and The Orenda
- Richard Ciano, former president of the Ontario PC Party and former vice-president of the Conservative Party of Canada
- Fabrizio Filippo, actor
- Charles Foran, writer
- Vince Gasparro, Member of Parliament
- Marc Kielburger, Rhodes Scholar and co-founder of Me to We, Free the Children and Leaders Today
- Gar Knutson, former Member of Parliament and Minister of the Crown (Secretary of State for Central and Eastern Europe and the Middle East and Minister of State for International Trade)
- Christopher E. Rudd, professor at Harvard and Cambridge universities, credited with major discoveries in immunology
- Kevin Sullivan, director of such Canadian films as Anne of Green Gables and Road to Avonlea
- Larry Uteck, CFL player and former deputy-mayor of Halifax; namesake of Uteck Cup, awarded annually to the top collegiate football team in Eastern Canada

== Notable former staff ==
- Terrence Prendergast S.J., archbishop of Ottawa

== See also ==
- Education in Ontario
- List of secondary schools in Ontario
- List of Jesuit sites
