= Sainte-Marie among the Hurons =

Coordinates: 44°44′03″N 79°50′43″W

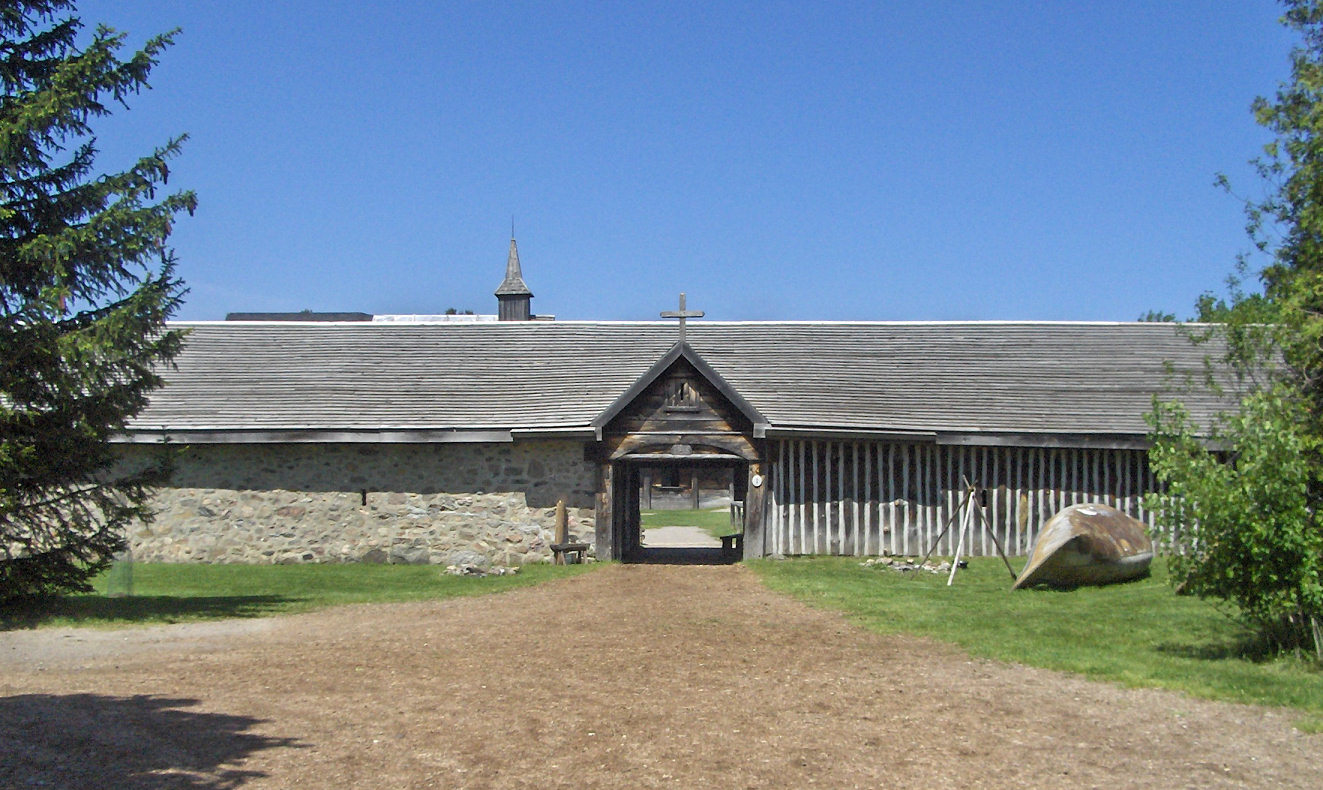
- Established: 1639
- Location: Midland, Ontario, Canada
- Type: living museum
- Website: www.saintemarieamongthehurons.on.ca/

National Historic Site of Canada
- Designated: 1920

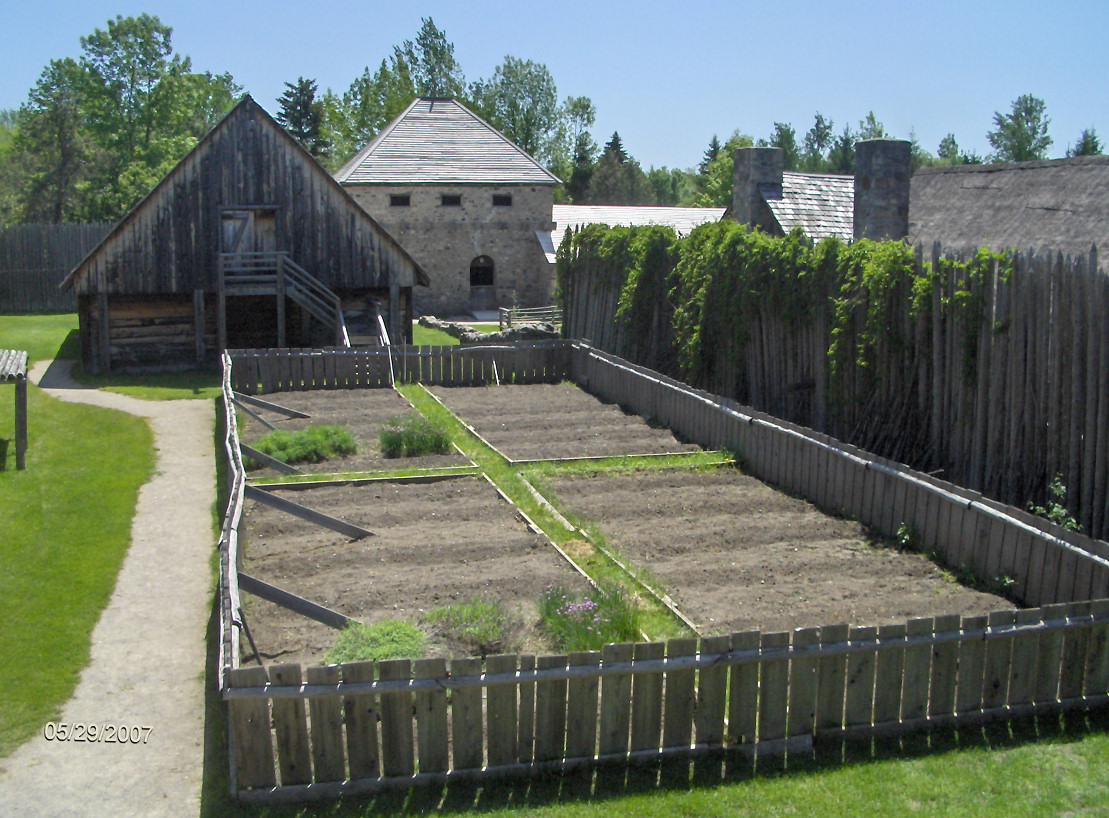
Vegetable garden.

Sainte-Marie among the Hurons (French: Sainte-Marie-au-pays-des-Hurons) was a French Jesuit settlement in Huronia or Wendake, the land of the Wendat (Huron), near modern Midland, Ontario, from 1639 to 1649. It was the first European settlement in what is now the province of Ontario. Eight missionaries from Sainte-Marie were martyred by the Haudenosaunee and were canonized by the Catholic Church in 1930. Sainte-Marie Among the Hurons was designated a National Historic Site of Canada in 1920. A reconstruction of the mission now operates as a living museum.

A nearby historic site, Carhagouha, marks the spot where an earlier Récollet missionary to Wendake, Father Joseph Le Caron, presided in 1615 over the first Catholic mass conducted in present-day Ontario. Another related site of historical interest is Saint-Louis Mission National Historic Site, located in present-day Victoria Harbour, Ontario. It was at Saint-Louis that Jesuit missionaries Jean de Brébeuf and Gabriel Lalement were captured when the Wendat village was attacked by the Haudenosaunee on March 16, 1649.

== History ==
Sainte-Marie among the Hurons was established in 1639 by French Jesuits, Fathers Jérôme Lalemant and Jean de Brébeuf in the land of the Wendat. The fortified missionary settlement acted as a centre and base of operations for Jesuit missionaries on the outskirts of what is now Midland, Ontario as they worked amongst the Wendat. It also provided an example of a functioning European community to the Wendat. The mission was built near the Wendat settlement of Quieunonascaranas, led by chief Auoindaon.

The mission was initially founded by 18 men. Arriving in November 1639, the priests erected a makeshift shelter out of "cypress" (probably eastern white cedar) pillars and a birch bark roof, using clay to build the interior walls. After the arrival of carpenter Charles Boivin, further construction resulted in a chapel, a residence for the Jesuits, a cookhouse, a smithy and other buildings. Sainte-Marie became the Jesuit headquarters in Huronia, from which the Jesuits travelled among the Iroquoian-speaking Wendat and Petun, and the Algonquian-speaking Nipissing, Odawa and Ojibwe peoples, whose languages were distinct but related to each other.

== Missionary life ==
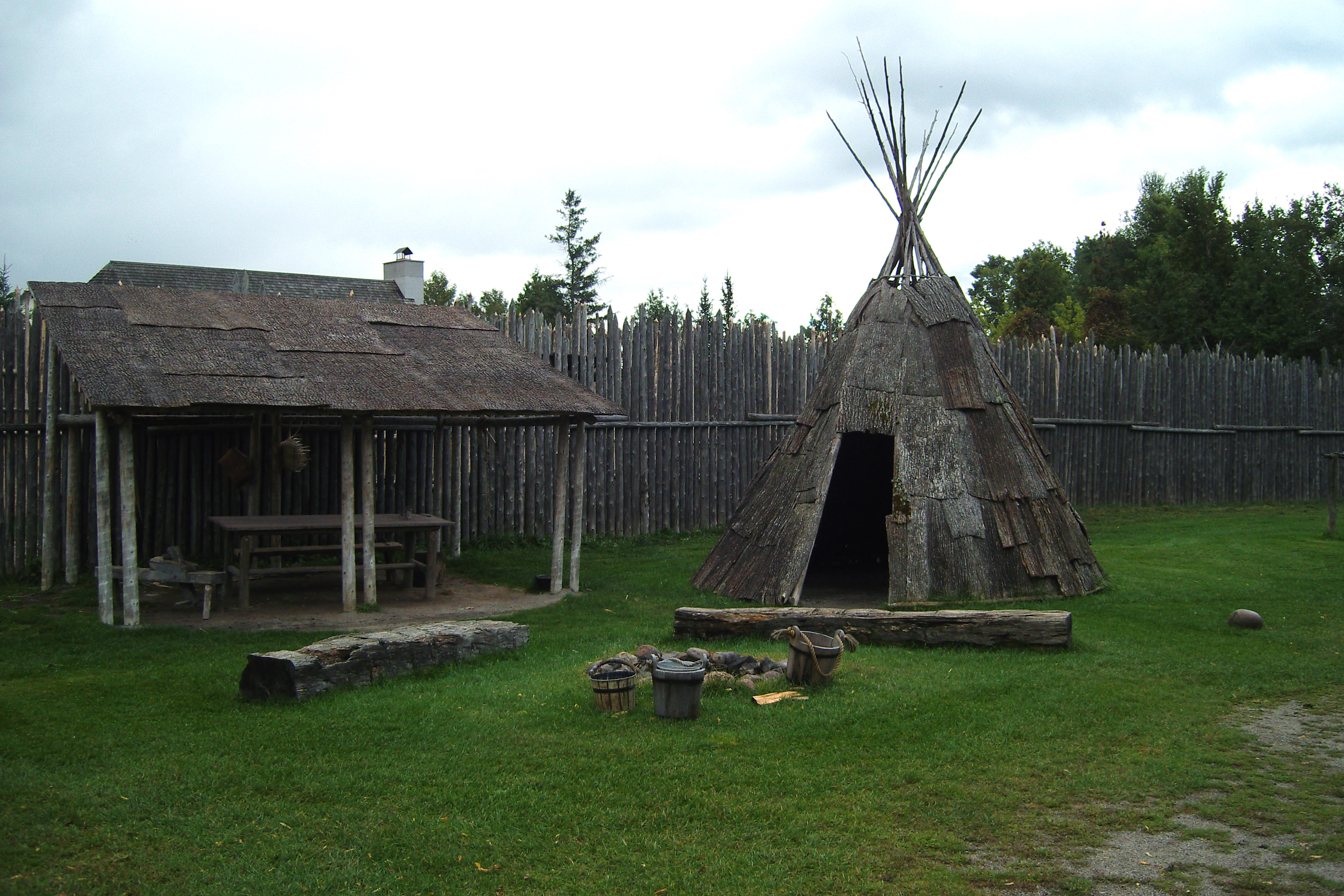
Wigwam

A small group of religiously devoted men, also known as donnés (offered, given or gifts), worked at Sainte-Marie among the Hurons, in return for food, clothing, and shelter. The Jesuits hired engagés, labourers, and non-clerical Jesuits known as "lay brothers". The Jesuits preached the Christian Gospel to the Wendat, often adapting the story to local customs and symbols. One of the most famous examples of this was the "Huron Carol", a Christmas hymn written by Jean de Brébeuf. A translated version of this song remains popular in Canadian churches to this day.

Soldiers had a small but important presence at the mission. Twenty-three soldiers wintered at Sainte-Marie in 1644, but many of the Jesuits resisted the idea of a military presence. They feared the soldiers would "bring the worst of Europe" with them.

The founding of the mission led to division amongst the Wendat, with conflict between those who converted to Christianity and those who maintained traditional beliefs. Infectious disease, an unintended result of first contact between the Jesuits, their farm animals and the Wendat, served to further the gap between the traditional Wendat and the missionaries. Epidemics of smallpox, which raged from 1634–1640, were brought by the increased number of children emigrating to the colonies with families from cities where the disease was endemic in France, England and the Netherlands. Also during this time, the rivalry between the Wendat and Haudenosaunee began to reignite. The Wendat were weakened by their internal divisions and their losses from disease. Prior to their contact with Europeans, the Wendat numbered twenty to twenty-five thousand. By 1642, after epidemics of Old World diseases, they numbered 9,500.

== War and martyrdom ==
With Haudenosaunee aggression on the rise, an additional six soldiers were dispatched from France in 1649. The weakened Wendat nation was little match for the strengthened Haudenosaunee, who had used their trading alliances with the Dutch to gain firearms.

Eight of the missionaries—St. Jean de Brébeuf (1649), St. Noël Chabanel (1649), St. Antoine Daniel (1648), St. Charles Garnier (1649), St. René Goupil (1642), St. Isaac Jogues (1646), St. Jean de Lalande (1646), and St. Gabriel Lalemant (1649)—were killed in the Huron-Iroquois War. Owing to the proximity of their deaths to Sainte-Marie, the French recovered the bodies of Brébeuf and Lalemant to be buried at the mission.

== Burning of Sainte-Marie ==
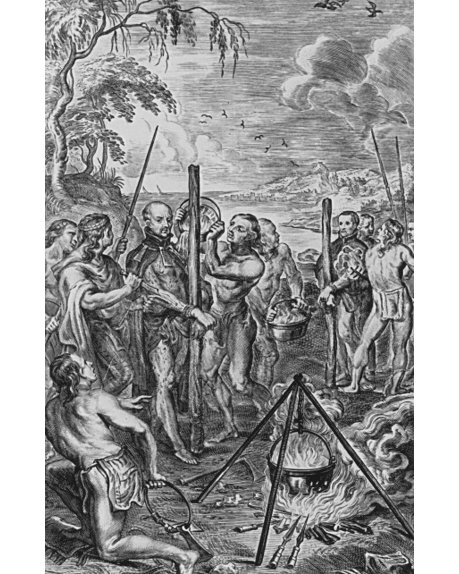
Brébeuf and Lallemant stand ready for boiling water/fire "Baptism", flaying

On June 16, 1649, the missionaries chose to burn the mission rather than risk it being desecrated or permanently overrun by Haudenosaunee in further attacks. Father Paul Ragueneau wrote,

"We ourselves set fire to it, and beheld burn before our eyes and in less than one hour, our work of nine or ten years."

Before the burning, the survivors had decided that Brébeuf and Lalemant would be canonized as martyrs. Shoemaker Christophe Regnault had to extract the bones of the two men to save as relics. Regnault exhumed the bodies, placed them into a lye solution and wrapped the bones in linens. The men's flesh remains were reburied together in the same grave.

The missionaries travelled to Gahoendoe with the Wendat in an effort to construct a second mission designed especially for defence. It was named Ste. Marie II. A severe winter and the constant threat of Haudenosaunee attack eventually forced the French from the area, and they travelled back to New France. They took along the bones of Brébeuf and Lalemant on both trips. The bones have been held as holy relics at Ste. Marie II, which can be visited across from the Anglican church on Christian Island.

== Modern reconstruction ==
The site lay dormant until 1844, when Jesuit Fr. Pierre Chazelle conducted initial site excavations. Father Félix Martin continued this in 1855. In 1940 the Society of Jesus purchased the property where Sainte-Marie had stood. In 1941, Kenneth Kidd of the Royal Ontario Museum undertook the first scientific excavations of the site, aided by W.J. Wintemberg. Wilfrid and Elsie Jury of the University of Western Ontario undertook additional excavations. In 1954 Fr. Dennis Hegarty discovered the graves of Brébeuf and Lalemant.

Starting in 1964, Sainte-Marie was reconstructed as a historical site and living museum. All of the buildings and their contents are reproductions. A popular tourist attraction, it draws thousands of visitors each week during the summer months. The site is managed by Huronia Historical Parks, an agency of the Ontario Ministry of Tourism and Culture.

Canonized by Pope Pius XI in 1930, the eight martyred missionaries are collectively known as the Canadian Martyrs. The site adjacent to the Martyrs' Shrine was visited by Pope John Paul II in 1984 as part of his papal visit to Canada.

On August 22, 2006, three of the reconstructed buildings—the blacksmith forge, carpenter's workshop and the chapel—were severely damaged in a fire. They have since been rebuilt.

== Affiliations ==
The museum is affiliated with the Canadian Museums Association, the Canadian Heritage Information Network and the Virtual Museum of Canada.

== Grounds ==
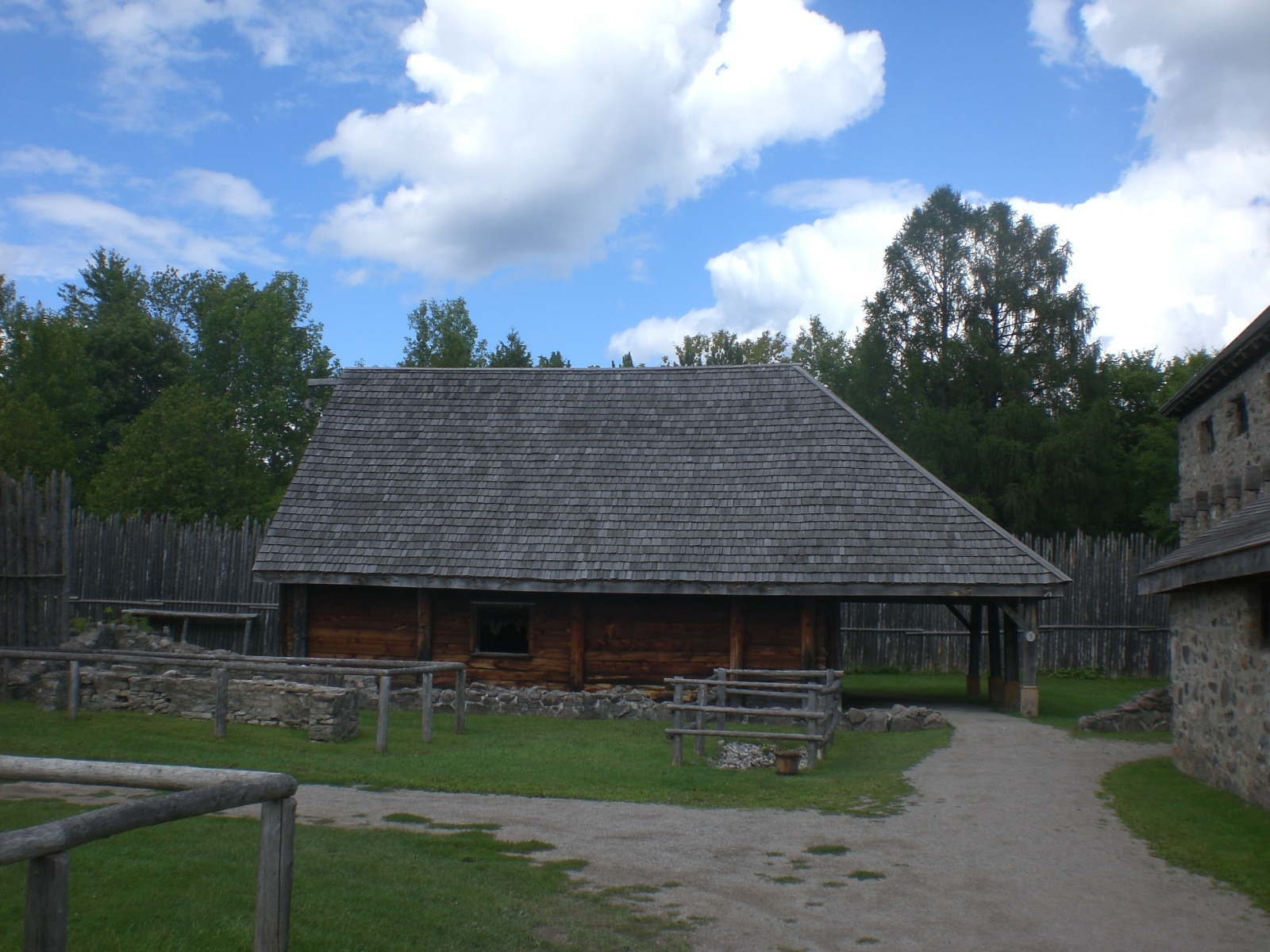
Jesuit community reconstructed building

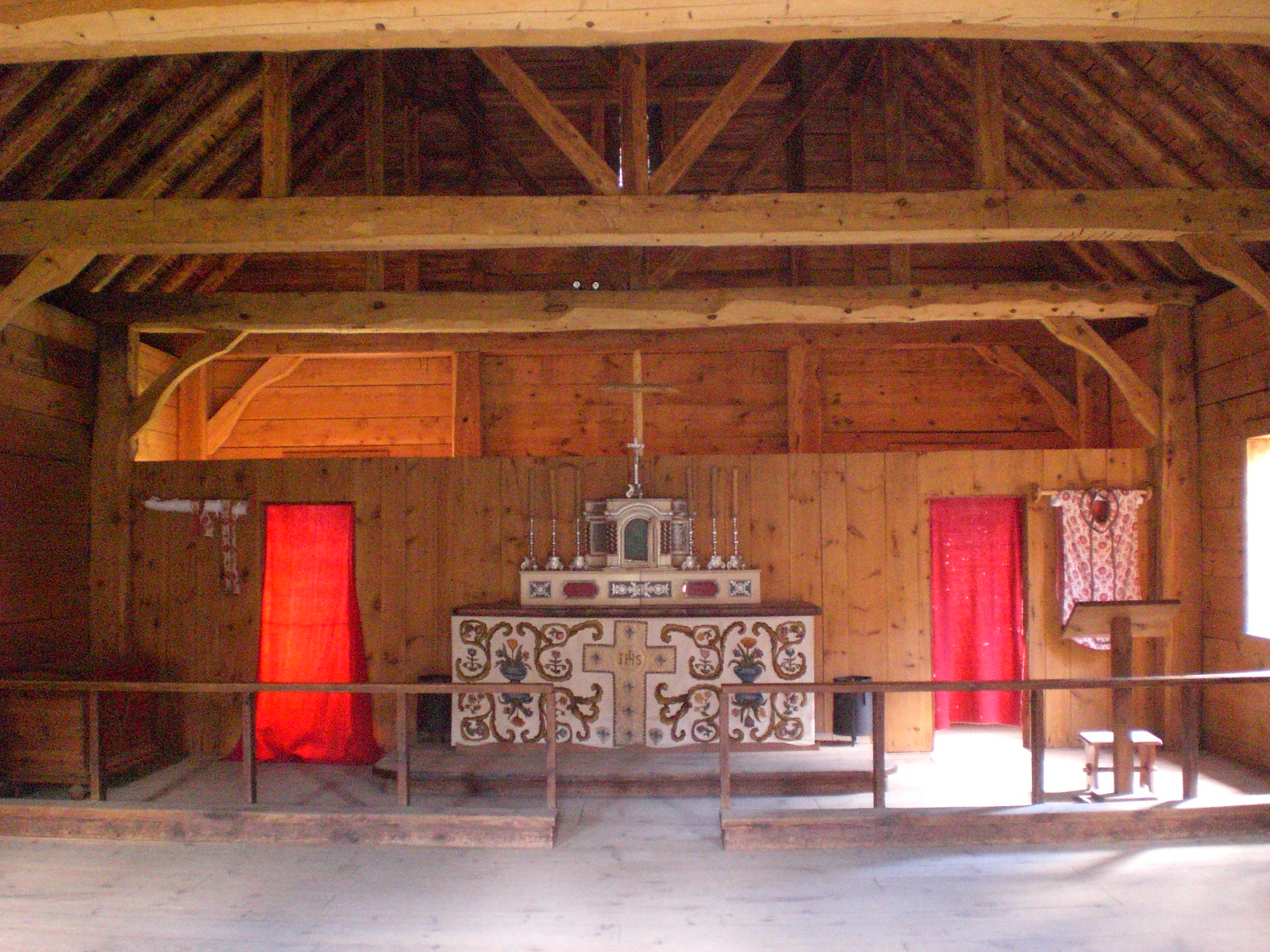
Jesuit chapel interior

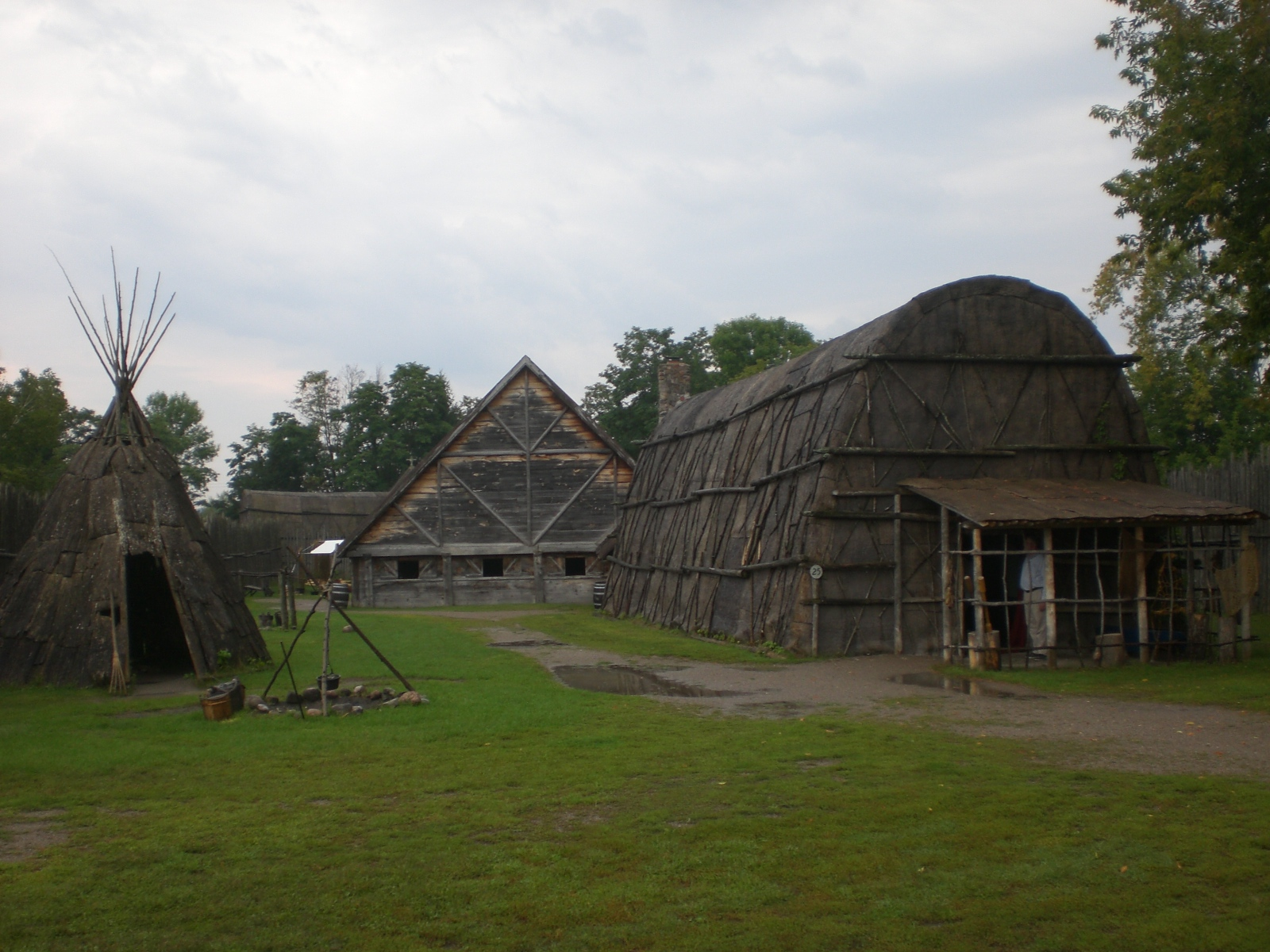
Reconstructed buildings in First Nation section

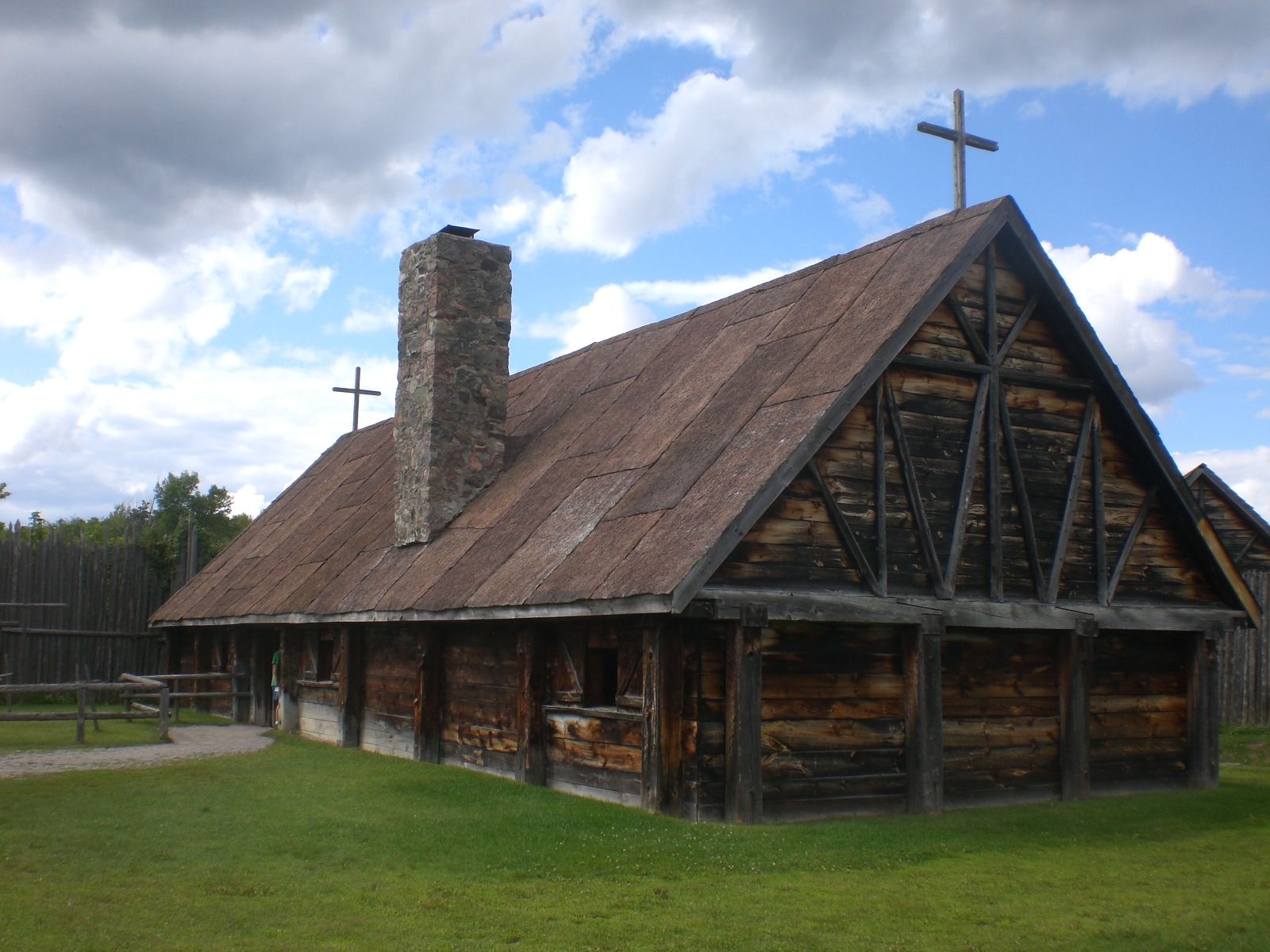
First Nations Chapel exterior

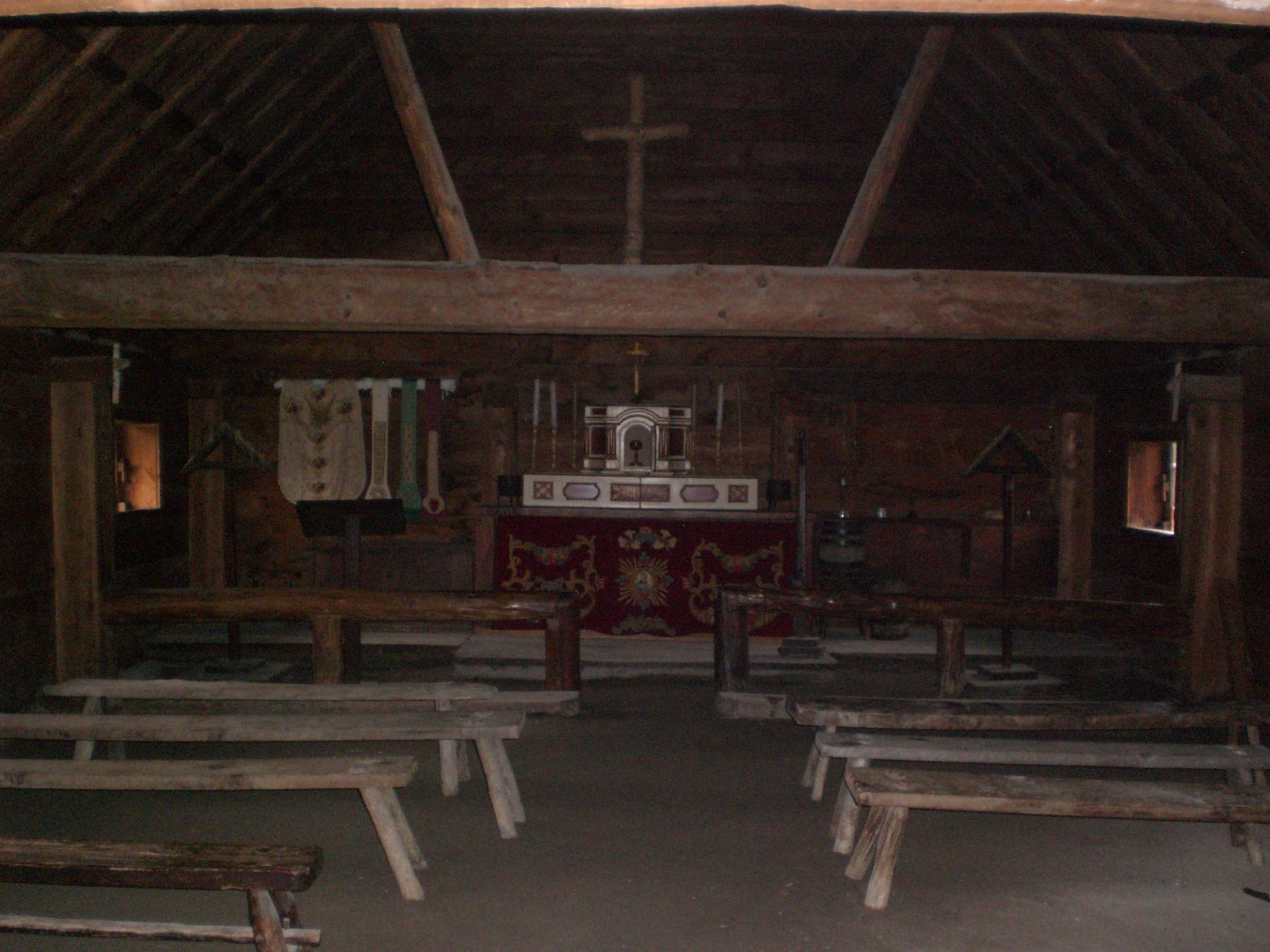
Chapel interior

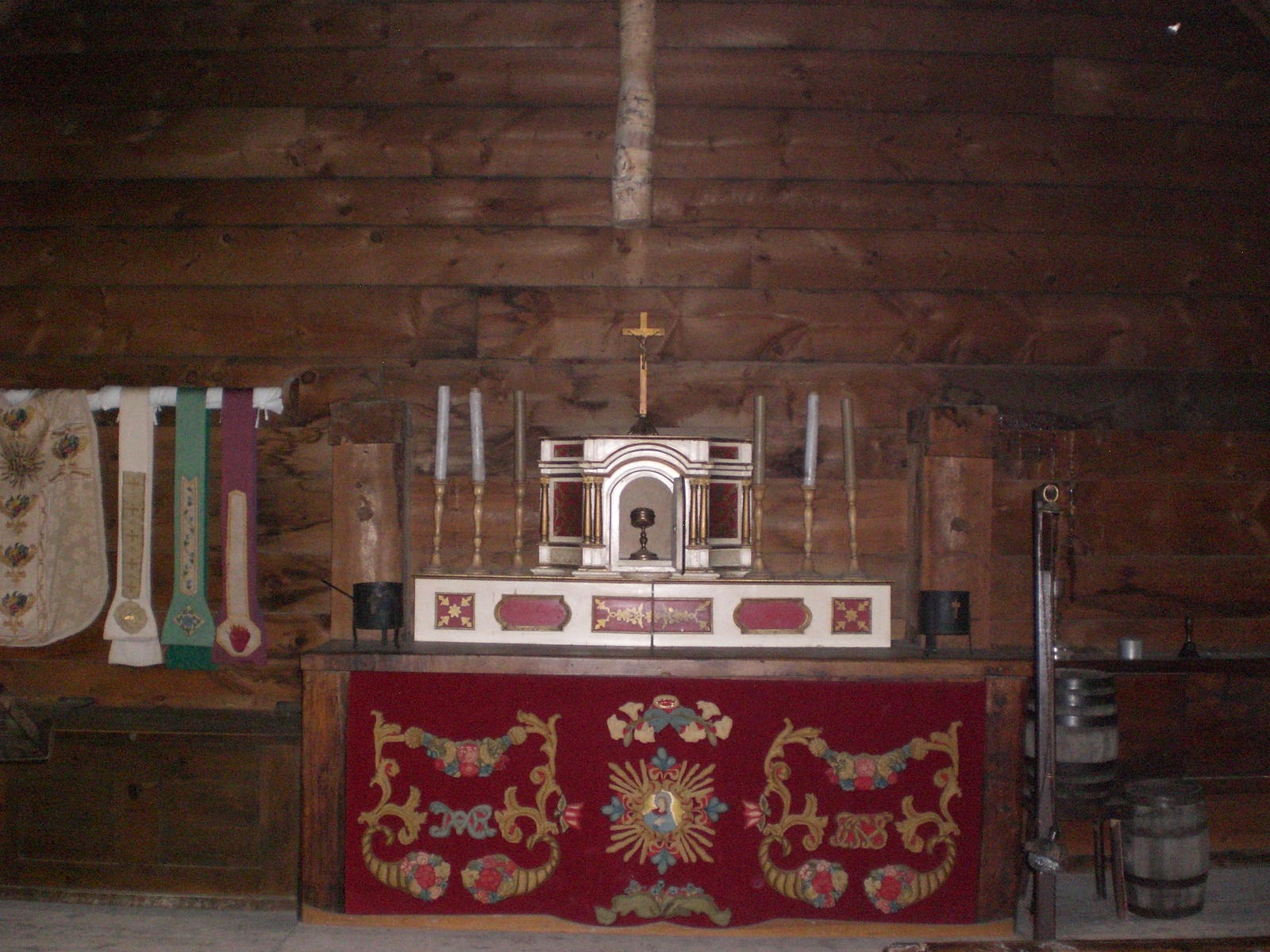
Chapel altar

== See also ==
- Jesuit missions in North America
- List of Jesuit sites
- Sainte Marie among the Iroquois
- Wendat people
