= Charles Garnier =

Charles Garnier may refer to:

- Charles Garnier (missionary) (1606–1649), Jesuit missionary, martyred in Canada in 1649
- Charles Garnier (architect) (1825–1898), French architect
- Charles Garnier (rower) (1887–1963), French Olympic rower

== See also ==
- Charlie Garner (born 1972), American football player
