= Shrine of the Canadian Martyrs =

Church in Ontario, Canada

Coordinates: 44.73661°N 79.84208°W

Martyrs' Shrine
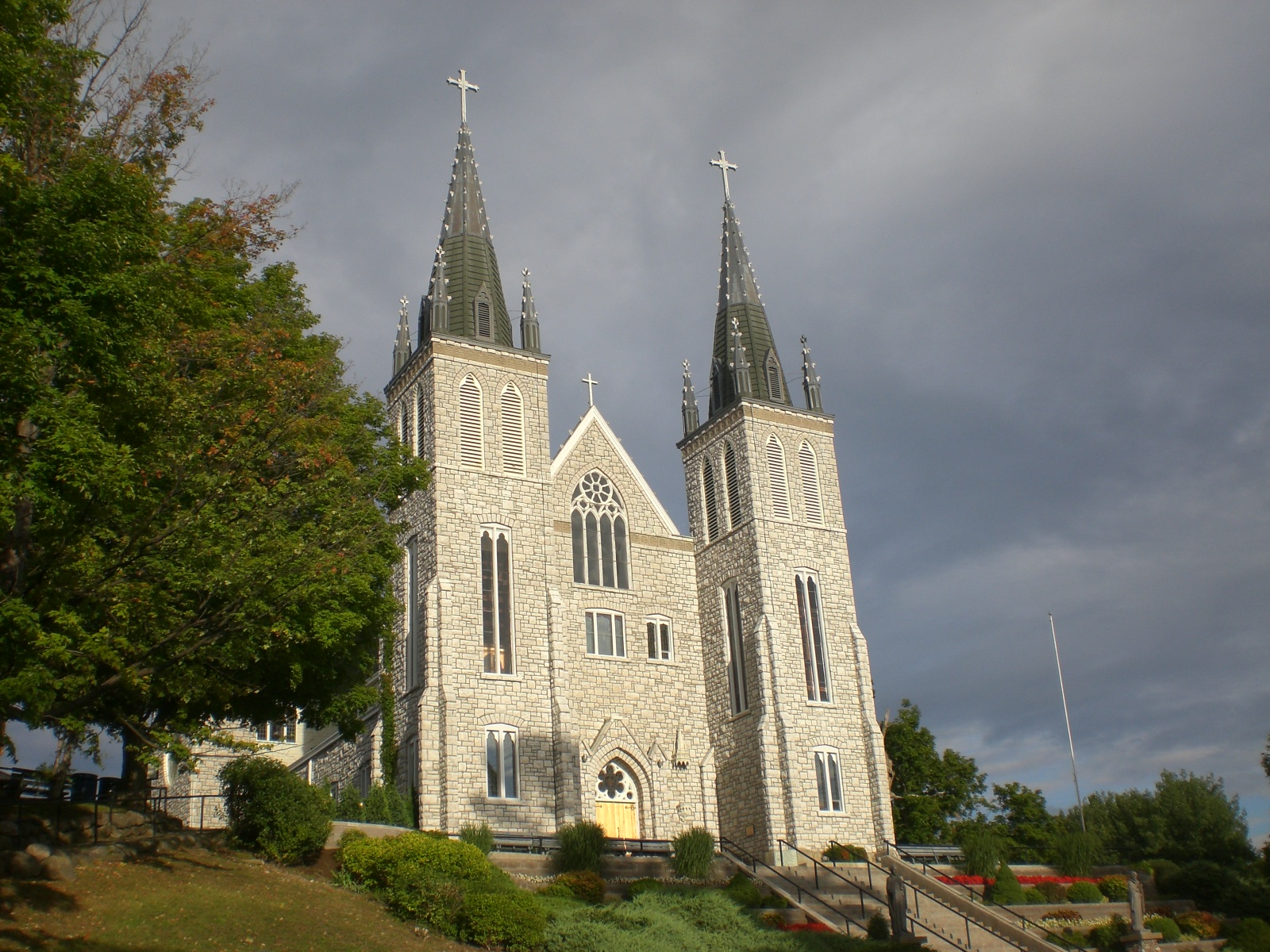
- Martyrs' Shrine
- Denomination: Roman Catholic
- Website: Martyrs-Shrine.com

History
- Dedication: Canadian Martyrs

Administration
- Province: Toronto

The Shrine of the Canadian Martyrs (French: Sanctuaire des martyrs canadiens), commonly known as the Martyrs' Shrine, is a Roman Catholic and historic place of worship located near Georgian Bay on Ontario Highway 12 in Midland, Ontario, Canada. The Martyrs' Shrine is consecrated to the memory of the Canadian Martyrs, six Jesuit Martyrs and two lay persons from the mission of Sainte-Marie among the Hurons, who were tortured and killed on various dates in the mid-17th century and subsequently canonized by the Catholic Church. It is one of six national shrines in Canada, including, among others, Saint Joseph's Oratory in Montreal and the Basilica of Sainte-Anne-de-Beaupré.

The Shrine's church is the Church of St. Joseph, constructed in 1925 in a fusion of European and Indigenous styles.

== History ==
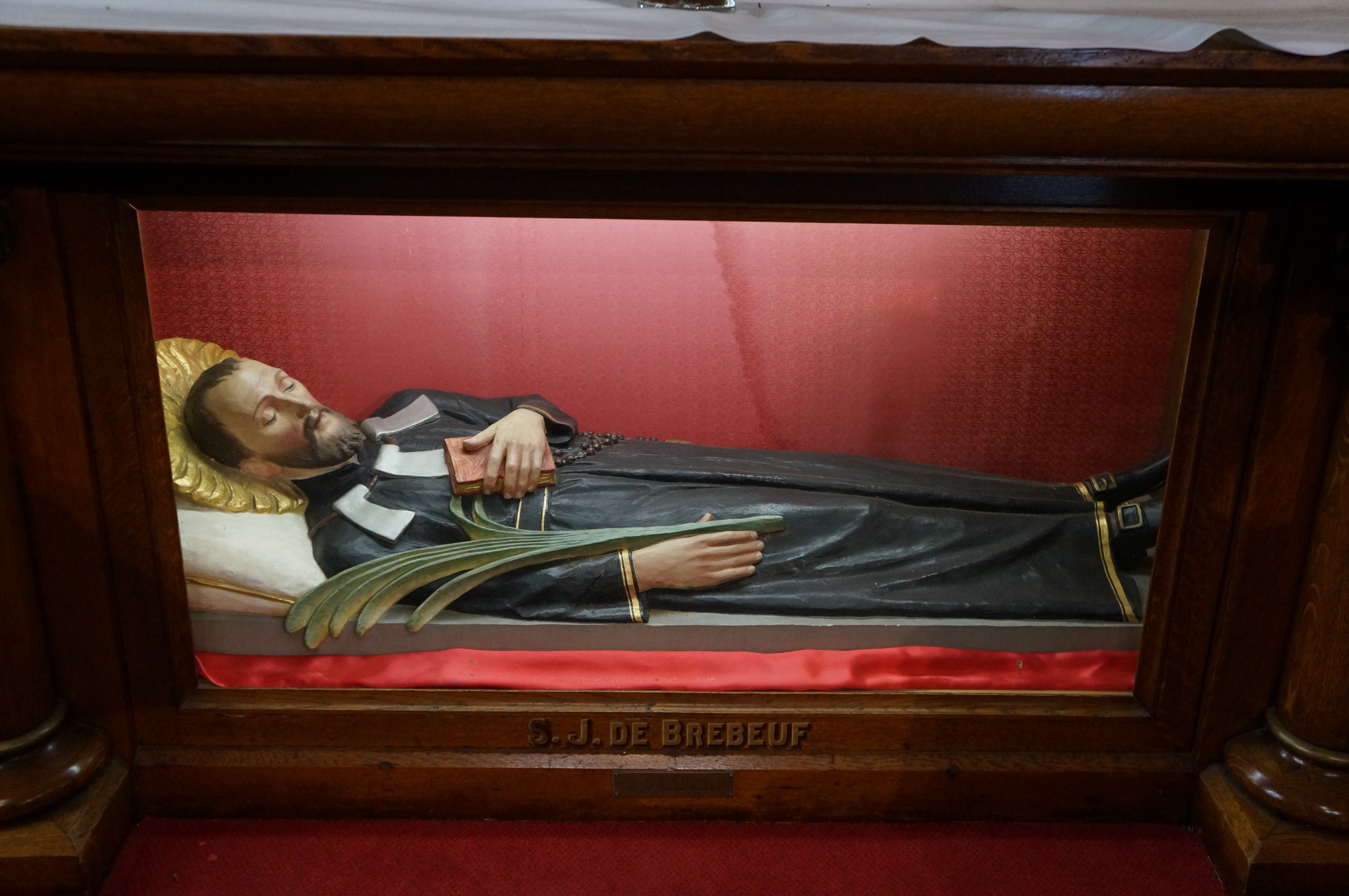
Statue of Saint Jean de Brébeuf. The shrine houses the bones of Brébeuf, and two other Canadian Martyrs.

In 1907, Dennis O'Connor, Archbishop of Toronto, consecrated a small chapel at Waubaushene, near the site where Sts. Jean de Brébeuf and Gabriel Lalemant were martyred.

In 1925, Fr. John M. Filion, provincial superior of Jesuits in Canada, decided to pursue the construction of a larger church closer to the mission. He bought the Standin farm in Midland, across the road from Sainte-Marie. Construction began that year, using some materials from the Waubaushene church and others donated by lumber companies in Northern Ontario. Pews, stained glass windows, Stations of the Cross and an altar were donated by churches in London and Toronto. The interior, shaped like an overturned canoe, was designed and built by Ildège Bourrie. Construction on the shrine was completed by the winter of 1925, and the shrine was formally consecrated on June 25, 1926 by Cardinal William Henry O'Connell of Boston, Massachusetts.

The shrine houses the bones of St. Jean de Brébeuf, St. Gabriel Lalemant, and St. Charles Garnier. Due to cold temperature conditions, the shrine is closed in autumn and winter, because it was built without any insulation. During that period, the reliquaries are taken out of the church. The martyrs were subsequently canonized by Pope Pius XI in 1930. Pope John Paul II visited the Martyrs' Shrine in September 1984, and prayed over the skull of Brébeuf.
