= Noël Chabanel =

French Jesuit missionary and martyr (1613-1649

Saint Noël Chabanel SJ
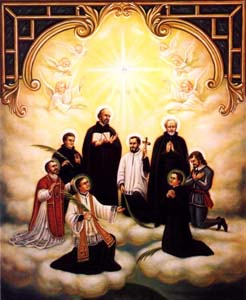

Martyr
- Born: February 2, 1613; Saugues (Haute-Loire), France
- Died: December 8, 1649 (aged 36); Sainte-Marie among the Hurons (Midland, Ontario, Canada)
- Beatified: June 21, 1925, Rome by Pope Pius XI
- Canonized: June 29, 1930, Rome by Pope Pius XI

Noël Chabanel (February 2, 1613 – December 8, 1649) was a Jesuit missionary at Sainte-Marie among the Hurons, and one of the Canadian Martyrs.

== Biography ==
Chabenal was born February 2, 1613 in the village of Saugues, France, the youngest of four children. His brother Pierre entered the Society of Jesus in 1623.

Chabanel entered the Jesuit novitiate at Toulouse at the age of seventeen, and became a professor of rhetoric at several Jesuit colleges. He was highly esteemed for virtue and learning. In 1643, he was sent to New France along with Leonard Garreau and Gabriel Druillettes. Although he studied the Algonquin language for a time, he never made much headway. He was appointed to the mission at Sainte-Marie. In his apostolic labours he was the companion of Charles Garnier.

As he felt a strong repugnance to the life and habits of the Wendat (Huron), and feared it might result in him withdrawing from the work, he bound himself by vow never to leave the mission except under obedience. Chabanel was sent to assist Jean de Brébeuf at the mission of Saint Louis (near the present day hamlet of Victoria Harbour), but was replaced in February 1649 by Gabriel Lalemant. Chabanel was sent to help Charles Garnier among the Petun. One month later, Brébeuf and Lalemant were captured in a Haudenosaunee raid on the St. Louis mission and taken to the nearby mission off St. Ignace where they were killed.

After the deaths of Brébeuf and Lalement, the Jesuits decided to abandon Sainte-Marie among the Hurons and burned the mission rather than risk it being desecrated or taken over by the Haudenosaunee. In early December 1649, Chabanel was directed to go to St. Joseph Island.

Chabanel was martyred on December 8, 1649, by what is described as a "renegade" Wendat. There was a strong presumption that he was killed by the man who offered to carry him across. Paul Ragueneau, Provincial Superior, noted that Louis Honarreennha was known to have believed and spread a false rumor that the French had betrayed the Wendat and made a secret treaty with the Haudenosaunee; and later admitted that he killed Chabanel.

== Veneration ==
Noël Chabanel was canonized by Pope Pius XI on 29 June 1930.
