= Auoindaon =

Auoindaon was the native chief of the Wendat (Huron) at Quieunonascaranas, a settlement in Wendake near modern-day Midland, Ontario, Canada. He made alliances with and became quite fond of French priests serving as missionaries in the area, one of the most notable being Gabriel Sagard. Upon first encountering Sagard, the Wendat community at Quieunonascaranas all came out to greet him. In 1623 the settlement consisted of about 300 households and almost 40 lodges.

Gabriel Sagard was a French missionary who travelled through New France (Canada) and became the first religious historian in Canada. He spent much time with the Wendat and wrote in detail about their customs and beliefs. It was during this missionary work that Sagard met Auoindaon, who was a Wendat chief at the time. Sagard's writings including The Long Journey to the Country of the Hurons is some of the most detailed and complete accounts of older Wendat civilizations and lifestyles.

Auoindaon and Sagard bonded well together and Auoindaon welcomed Sagard as a visitor. From Sagard's own writing he claims that Auoindaon offered to stay the night with him because Auoindaon feared that Sagard would be harmed by Haudenosaunee who had stormed through the village not too long before.

Sagard accompanied Auoindaon on an annual fishing trip, which was an important part of Wendat culture at the time. Documentation of the event describes that fish nets were put out at night and pulled in with catches in the morning. The people attending the event slept in wigwam type structures and set the nets out nearby. A fish- preacher was also present who would talk out to the fish while reciting hymns in the effort to lead the fish to the nets that were set out. Various other rituals were also performed such as throwing tobacco into the fire while reciting hymns and incantations. The fish that were caught during this trip were used for a multitude of things. Many of the fish were boiled for oil, while some others were gutted and hung up to dry. This annual fishing trip was a time of great merryment and celebration for all the members attending.

== Saint-Marie among the Hurons ==
In 1623, Auoindaon gave permission to the missionaries to begin construction on a mission which came to be called Saint-Marie-au-pays-des Hurons or Sainte-Marie among the Hurons, and was to be built close by to Quieunonascaranas. The mission was established in 1639 and was the first non-Indian settlement in Ontario. It was considered to be one of the most important missionary settlements and served as the center for travel between missions for the Jesuits. It stayed as a settlement from 1639 to 1649. The close proximity between the Wendat village and the mission caused tensions to rise over time. There were people living in Quieunonascaranas who embraced Christianity and the missions willingly, and people who wanted to continue with traditional beliefs. Many in the Wendat community blamed the missionaries for disease outbreaks and for undermining the shamans.

Auoindaon became convinced that the Europeans were "oki", influential spirits or forces, because the continuous rain storm that had been occurring stopped itself until just after the cabin was finished. Oki were spirits or deities that were particularly respected by the Wendat. Although the term could refer to several subjects: such as good and bad spirits as well as revered prophets, deities, angels, or demons.

== Second contact with Jesuit Priests ==
It is notable that after 1630 there is no mention of Auoindaon and his position had been replaced by a man named Aenons. Although there is speculation on whether or not Auoindaon and Aenons are one and the same, there is no solid evidence to suggest that they were. In 1633 more Jesuit priests were planning on settling near the original settlement of Sainte-Marie among the Hurons, although when they arrived the people of Quieunonascaranas made no move to greet them as they originally had in 1625, even though this was the first village to have a resident priest. It was around this time too that Quieunonascaranas began dwindling in political and social influence and over time Aenons moved the community over to the Toanche area.

== Wendat Nation and first contact with Europeans ==
The Wendat, known in French as the Huron, were a large community living in what is now Ontario, Canada. At the time of first contact with the Europeans, the Wendat were strong as a community with over an estimated 25,000 people, but as more and more European settlers came over the numbers of people dwindled to about 9,000 in result of diseases that the Wendat had no immunity to, such as smallpox and measles.

At one point, they had been allies with the Haudenosaunee, but after a series of attacks the Wendat were pushed from their homeland. This is how it was when the Wendat first made contact with the Europeans, they were still enemies with the Haudenosaunee. The Wendat had strong trading, social and political relations with many tribes of the Ottawa Valley. These tribes include the Petun, Algonquin, Nipissing, Neutral and Odawa. The Wendat community would move locations every decade or so after natural resources in the area had been exhausted such as crop soil and firewood. They also established a confederacy of their own along the northern coastal part of Lake Ontario. Trading was very important to the Wendat and the trade relations they established meant that they had access to seashells, wampum, copper, and tobacco.

The Wendat accepted and helped French missionaries so that they could establish good trade relations. The first French missionaries to arrive were the Recollects, who were who were French reformers of the Friars Minor. The Recollect missionaries arrived around 1615. Within ten years however, these missionaries would be replaced by Jesuits in 1625. The Jesuits were the people who got permission from Auoindaon to commission and begin building Sainte-Marie among the Hurons nearby the Wendat village of Quieunonascaranas.
