= Jérôme Lalemant =

French Jesuit priest and missionary to Canada (1593–1673)

Jérôme Lalemant, S.J. (French pronunciation: [ʒeʁom lalmɑ̃]; Paris, April 27, 1593 – Quebec City, January 26, 1673) was a French Jesuit priest who was a leader of the Jesuit mission in New France.

== Life ==
Lalemant entered the Jesuit novitiate in Paris on 20 October 1610, after which he studied philosophy at Pont-à-Mousson (1612–15) and theology at the Collège de Clermont (1619–23). In the following interval, while he fulfilled his period of regency, he served as a prefect of the Jesuit boarding school at Verdun (1615–16) and teacher at the Collège in Amiens (1616–19). After finishing his study of theology he taught philosophy and the sciences at the Collège de Clermont (1623–26), and did his tertianship, a third probationary year of the Society of Jesus, at Rouen (1626–27), after which he was allowed to profess the fourth vow specific to the Society of Jesus.

Following the completion of his formation period, Lalement became the chaplain of the Collège de Clermont (1627–29) and head of the boarding school of this same college (1629–32), and then Rector of the college in Blois (1632–36). From 1636 to 1638 he was again at the Collège de Clermont, this time as chaplain. Few Jesuits had had as wide experience as Lalemant before he was allowed to go to Canada, an evidence of the high esteem in which he was held by his superiors.

Lalement was almost immediately made Superior for the mission to the Hurons, succeeding Jean de Brébeuf, and in 1639 founded Sainte-Marie-des-Hurons which was the central residence of the missionaries in the field. The mission was located just south of Georgian Bay on Lake Huron and near modern-day Midland, Ontario.

From 1645 to 1650, Lalemant served as Provincial Superior of the Jesuits in Canada. (His brother, Charles Lalemant, was the first Superior of Canada). This was during this period that all eight of the Jesuit missionaries from Sainte-Marie among the Hurons, known as the Canadian Martyrs were killed. His own nephew, Gabriel Lalemant and Jean de Brébeuf died together in 1649. In 1650, he venerated their remains in Quebec.

The Wendat nation were little match for the Iroquois, who used their trade alliances with the Dutch to gain firearms. On June 16, 1649, the missionaries chose to burn Sainte-Marie rather than risk it being desecrated or permanently overrun by Iroquois in further attacks. Later in 1650, Lalemant went to France and taught at La Flèche college. Father Paul Ragueneau succeeding him as Superior in Canada. On his return to Canada the following year, he served under Ragueneau until 1656, when he was recalled to France to be rector of the Royal College of La Flèche. He returned in 1659 and served a second term as Canadian Provincial Superior from to 1665, at the urgings of Bishop François de Laval. He helped resettle Huron refugees near Québec, and continued to solidify the Jesuit mission in Canada and his writings give us verifiable information about the social, political, and religious life of Canada during that period.
