= Charles Lallemant =

French Jesuit missionary (1587–1674)

The Reverend Charles Lallemant SJ
- Born: November 17, 1587; Paris, Kingdom of France
- Died: November 18, 1674 (aged 87); Paris, Kingdom of France
- Resting place: Paris, France
- Known for: Relations des Jésuites de la Nouvelle-France
- Relatives: Jérôme Lalemant, S.J. (brother); Gabriel Lalemant, S.J. (nephew)

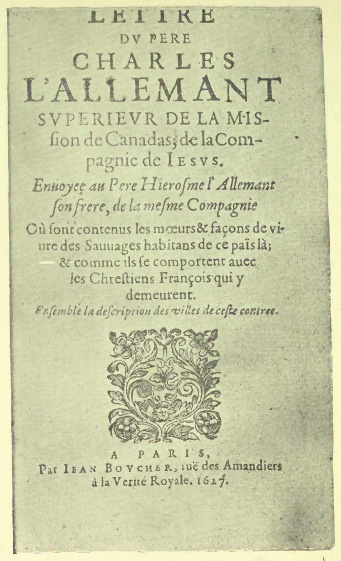

Charles Lallemant, SJ (French pronunciation: [ʃaʁl lalmɑ̃]; or Lalemant; November 17, 1587 – November 18, 1674) was a French Jesuit missionary. He was born in Paris in 1587 and later became the first superior of the Jesuit Missions amongst the Huron in Canada. His letter to his brother, dated August 1, 1626, inaugurated the series Relations des Jésuites de la Nouvelle-France about the missionary work in the North American colonies of New France.

== Biography ==
Born in Paris to an official of the criminal court, Lalemant entered the novitiate of the Society of Jesus at Rouen on July 29, 1607. Following this period, he studied philosophy at the Jesuit college in La Flèche (1609–12). For the subsequent formation period of his regency, he taught the lower classes at the college in Nevers (1612–15), then studied theology at La Flèche (1615–19). After this, his spent his period of tertianship, a third probationary year, in Paris (1619–20). He then served as a teacher of logic and physics at the college in Bourges (1620–22), and from October 1622 to March 1625 was principal of the boarding school at the Collège de Clermont.

Lalement was made responsible for setting up a mission of the Society of Jesus in New France, and in April 1625 he left Dieppe with Fathers Énemond Massé and Jean de Brébeuf, accompanied by two lay brothers. He arrived in Quebec City on 15 June. Neither the directors of the Compagnie de Montmorency nor the settlers, among whom the pamphlet Anti-Coton was then circulating, had any liking for the Jesuits. But the Recollets received them with great kindliness and gave them hospitality until they could have their own house. Lalemant was quick to realize that the progress of the colony was being impeded by the very people who ought to have promoted it, the de Caëns, who were interested exclusively in the fur trade. A change was imperative. Therefore, as soon as Jesuit Father Philibert Noyrot arrived in 1626 he was ordered, because of the good standing that he enjoyed at the court, to take ship again for France, with the object of advancing the welfare of the colony. One result of this move was the revocation of the Edict of Nantes so far as New France was concerned.

Noyrot had arranged for supplies to be sent to his colleagues in Quebec City, but they never reached their destination. According to Father Chrestien Le Clercq, they were seized at Honfleur by Raymond de La Ralde and Guillaume de Caën. Thwarted by the Trading Company at Quebec in his efforts to evangelize the Indians, Lallemant sailed to France in order to lodge a protest. Attempting to return to New France, his vessel was captured by Kirke who was then blockading the Saint Lawrence River. Lallemant and Father Francis Ragueneau S.J. were sent as prisoners to England but subsequently released at the request of Queen Henrietta Maria.

A second attempt in 1629 to travel to Canada resulted in shipwreck off Cape Canso, and on his way back to France he was wrecked a second time on the coast of Spain. Back in France, he was made rector of the college at Eu. He finally reached New France in 1632, after Quebec was restored to the French.

Lallemant returned again to France in 1638, where he became procurator of the Canadian missions, Vice Provincial Superior of the French Province of the Society and superior of the Jesuit house in Paris. He obtained the concession of the Island of Montreal for the colony of Dauversière, and he also recruited Maisonneuve and Jeanne Mance to engage in the undertaking. When there was question of appointing the first Bishop of Quebec, his candidacy was urged.

Lallemant was the author of a spiritual work entitled La vie cachée de Notre Seigneur Jésus-Christ. He is not to be confused with Louis Lallemant, author of Les Conferences Spirituelles.

Lallemant died in Paris on 18 November 1674.

== Family ==
Lallemant had two close relatives in the Jesuit missions: Jérôme Lalemant, his brother was Vicar-General of Quebec, and his nephew Gabriel Lalemant was one of the Canadian Martyrs murdered by the Iroquois and is honored as a saint by the Catholic Church.

== Gallery ==
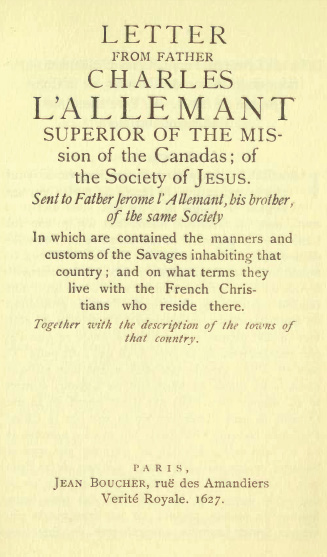
The English translation, 1897
