= Pierre Chastellain =

Jesuit missionary

Pierre Chastellain (1606 – 14 August 1684) was a Jesuit missionary among the Wendat (Huron).

== Life ==
Chastellain joined the Jesuits in 1624 and in 1636 sailed for New France with two other priests, Fathers Isaac Jogues and Charles Garnier. Also on the voyage was the Governor of New France, Charles de Montmagny who was replacing Samuel de Champlain.

In July, 1636, Chastellain and Garnier left Trois-Rivières to join the mission in the Wendat country. He spent almost fifty years at appointments among the Wendat as well as in Quebec. He was a strong gentle man with a personal charity towards others.

An important legacy of his life is his book "Affectus amantis Christum seu Exercitium amoris erga Dominum Jesum pro totâ hebdomadâ".
