= Jean de Brébeuf =

French Jesuit missionary and martyr (1593–1649)

Saint Jean de Brébeuf S.J.
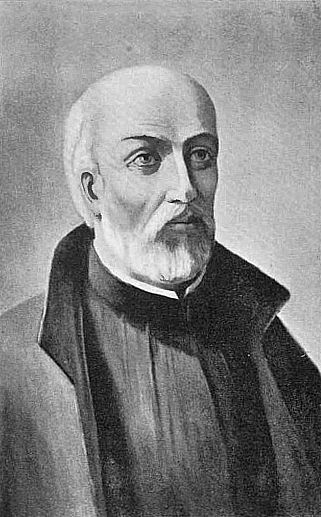

Martyr Apostle of the Hurons
- Born: 25 March 1593; Condé-sur-Vire, Normandy, France
- Died: 16 March 1649 (aged 55); Wendat village of St. Ignace, near Sainte-Marie among the Hurons, near Midland, Ontario, Canada
- Venerated in: Catholic Church, Anglican Communion
- Beatified: 12 June 1925
- Canonized: 29 June 1930, Canada, by Pope Pius XI
- Major shrine: Martyrs' Shrine, Midland, Ontario
- Feast: 16 March, 26 September (Canada, also United States in General Roman Calendar 1962), 19 October (United States and elsewhere)
- Attributes: Pyx
- Patronage: Canada

Jean de Brébeuf SJ (French: [ʒɑ̃ də bʁe.bœf]) (25 March 1593 – 16 March 1649) was a French Jesuit missionary who travelled to New France (Canada) in 1625. There he worked primarily with the Wendat (Huron) for the rest of his life, except for a few years in France from 1629 to 1633. He learned their language and customs, writing extensively about each to aid other missionaries.

In 1649, Brébeuf and another missionary were captured when a group of Haudenosaunee (Iroquois) raided a Wendat village (referred to in French as Saint-Louis). Together with Wendat captives, the missionaries were ritually tortured and killed on 16 March 1649. Afterwards, his heart was eaten by Haudenosaunee tribesmen. Brébeuf was beatified in 1925 and with eight Jesuit missionaries was canonized in the Catholic Church in 1930.

== Biography ==
=== Early years ===
Brébeuf was born 25 March 1593 in Condé-sur-Vire, Normandy, France (He was the uncle of poet Georges de Brébeuf.). He joined the Society of Jesus in 1617 at the age of 24, spending the next two years under the direction of Lancelot Marin. Between 1619 and 1621, he was a teacher at the college of Rouen. Brébeuf was nearly expelled from the Society when he contracted tuberculosis in 1620—a severe and usually fatal illness that prevented his studying and teaching for the traditional periods.

His record as a student was not particularly distinguished, but Brébeuf was already beginning to show an aptitude for languages. Later in New France, he would teach Native American languages to missionaries and French traders. Brébeuf was ordained as a priest at Pontoise Cathedral in February 1622.

=== Missionary ===
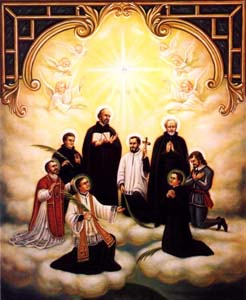
North American Martyrs

After three years as Steward at the College of Rouen, Brébeuf was chosen by the Provincial of France, Father Pierre Coton, to embark on the missions to New France.

In June 1625, Brébeuf arrived in Québec with Fathers Charles Lalemant and Énemond Massé, together with the lay brothers François Charton and Gilbert Burel. He worked at the Sainte-Marie among the Hurons. For about five months Brébeuf lived with a tribe of Innu, who spoke an Algonquian language. He was later assigned in 1626 to the Wendat (Huron) with Father Anne Nouée. From then on Brébeuf worked mostly as a missionary to the Wendat, who spoke an Iroquoian language. Brébeuf briefly took up residence with the Bear Tribe at Toanché, but met with no success in trying to convert them to Catholicism. He was summoned to Québec because of the danger to which the entire colony was then exposed by the English. He reached Québec on 17 July 1628 after an absence of two years. On 19 July 1629, Samuel de Champlain surrendered, and the missionaries returned to France.

In Rouen, Brébeuf served as a preacher and confessor, taking his final Jesuit vows in 1630. Between 1631 and 1633, Brébeuf worked at the College of Eu (now in Seine-Maritime) in northern France as a steward, minister and confessor. He returned to New France in 1633, where he lived and worked for the rest of his life.

Along with Antoine Daniel and Ambroise Davost, Brébeuf chose Ihonatiria (Saint-Joseph I) as the centre for missionary activity with the Wendat. At the time, the Wendat suffered epidemics of new Eurasian diseases contracted from the Europeans. Their death rates were high, as they had no immunity to the diseases long endemic in Europe. They, with our hindsight, rightly blamed the Europeans for the deaths, with none of the parties understanding the causes.

Called Échon by the Wendat, Brébeuf was personally involved with teaching. His lengthy conversations with Wendat friends left him with a good knowledge of their culture and spirituality. He learned their language and taught it to other missionaries and colonists. Fellow Jesuits such as Paul Ragueneau describe his ease and adaptability to the Wendat way of life.

His efforts to develop a complete ethnographic record of the Wendat has been described as "the longest and most ambitious piece of ethnographic description in all The Jesuit Relations". Brébeuf tried to find parallels between the Wendat religion and Christianity, so as to facilitate the conversion of the Wendat to Catholicism. Brébeuf was known by the Wendat for his apparent shamanistic skills, especially in rainmaking. Despite his efforts to learn their ways, he considered Wendat spiritual beliefs to be undeveloped and "foolish delusions"; he was determined to convert them to Christianity. Brébeuf did not enjoy universal popularity with the Wendat, as many believed he was a sorcerer. By 1640, nearly half the Wendat had died of smallpox and the losses disrupted their society. Many children and elders died. With their loved ones dying before their eyes, many Wendat began to listen to the words of Jesuit missionaries who, unaffected by the disease, appeared to be men of great power.

Brébeuf's progress as a missionary in achieving conversions was slow. Not until 1635 did some Wendat agree to be baptized as Christians. He claimed to have made 14 converts as of 1635 and, by the next year, he claimed 86. He wrote a detailed account in 1636 of The Huron Feast of the Dead, a mass reburial of remains of loved ones after a community moved the location of its village. It was accompanied by elaborate rituals and gift-giving.

In 1638, Brébeuf turned over the direction of the mission at Saint-Joseph I to Jérôme Lalemant; he was called to become Superior at his newly founded Saint-Joseph II. In 1640, after an unsuccessful mission into Neutral Nation territory, Brébeuf broke his collarbone. He was sent to Québec to recover and worked there as a mission procurator. He taught the Wendat, acting as confessor and advisor to the Ursulines and Religious Hospitallers. On Sundays and feast days, he preached to French colonists.

Brébeuf is credited with composing the "Huron Carol", Canada's oldest Christmas song, written around 1642. He wrote the lyrics in the native language of the Wendat people. The song's melody is based on a traditional French folk song, "Une Jeune Pucelle" (A Young Maid).

=== Linguistic work ===
The educational rigour of the Jesuit seminaries prepared missionaries to acquire native languages. But, as they had learned the classical and Romance languages, they likely had difficulty with the very different conventions of the New World indigenous languages. Brébeuf's study of the languages was also shaped by his religious training. Current Catholic theology tried to reconcile knowledge of world languages with accounts in the Bible of the tower of Babel, as this was the basis of European history. This influence can be seen in his discussion of language in his accounts collected in The Jesuit Relations.

Jean de Brébeuf's remarkable facility with language was one of the reasons he was chosen for the Wendat mission in 1626. He is distinguished for his commitment to learning the Wendat language. People with a strong positive attitude towards the language often learn the language much more easily. Brébeuf was widely acknowledged to have best mastered the Native oratory style, which used metaphor, circumlocution and repetition. Learning the language was still onerous, and he wrote to warn other missionaries of the difficulties.

To explain the low number of converts, Brébeuf noted that missionaries first had to master the Wendat language. His commitment to this work demonstrates he understood that mutual intelligibility was vital for communicating complex and abstract religious ideas. He believed learning native languages was imperative for the Jesuit missions, but noted that it was so difficult a task that it consumed most of the priest's time. Brébeuf felt his primary goal in his early years in New France was to learn the language.

With increasing proficiency in the Wendat language, Brébeuf became optimistic about advancing his missionary goals. By understanding Wendat religious beliefs and communicating Christian fundamentals, he could secure converts to Christianity. He realized the people would not give up all their traditional beliefs.

Brébeuf worked tirelessly to record his findings for the benefit of other missionaries. He built on the work of Recollects priests but significantly advanced the study, particularly in his representations of sounds. He discovered and reported the feature of compound words in Wendat, which may have been his major linguistic contribution. This breakthrough had enormous consequences for further study, becoming the foundation for all subsequent Jesuit linguistic work.

He translated Ledesma's catechism from French into Wendat, and arranged to have it printed. It was the first printed text in that language (with French orthography). He also compiled a dictionary of Wendat words, emphasizing translation of religious phrases such as from prayers and the Bible.

=== Death ===
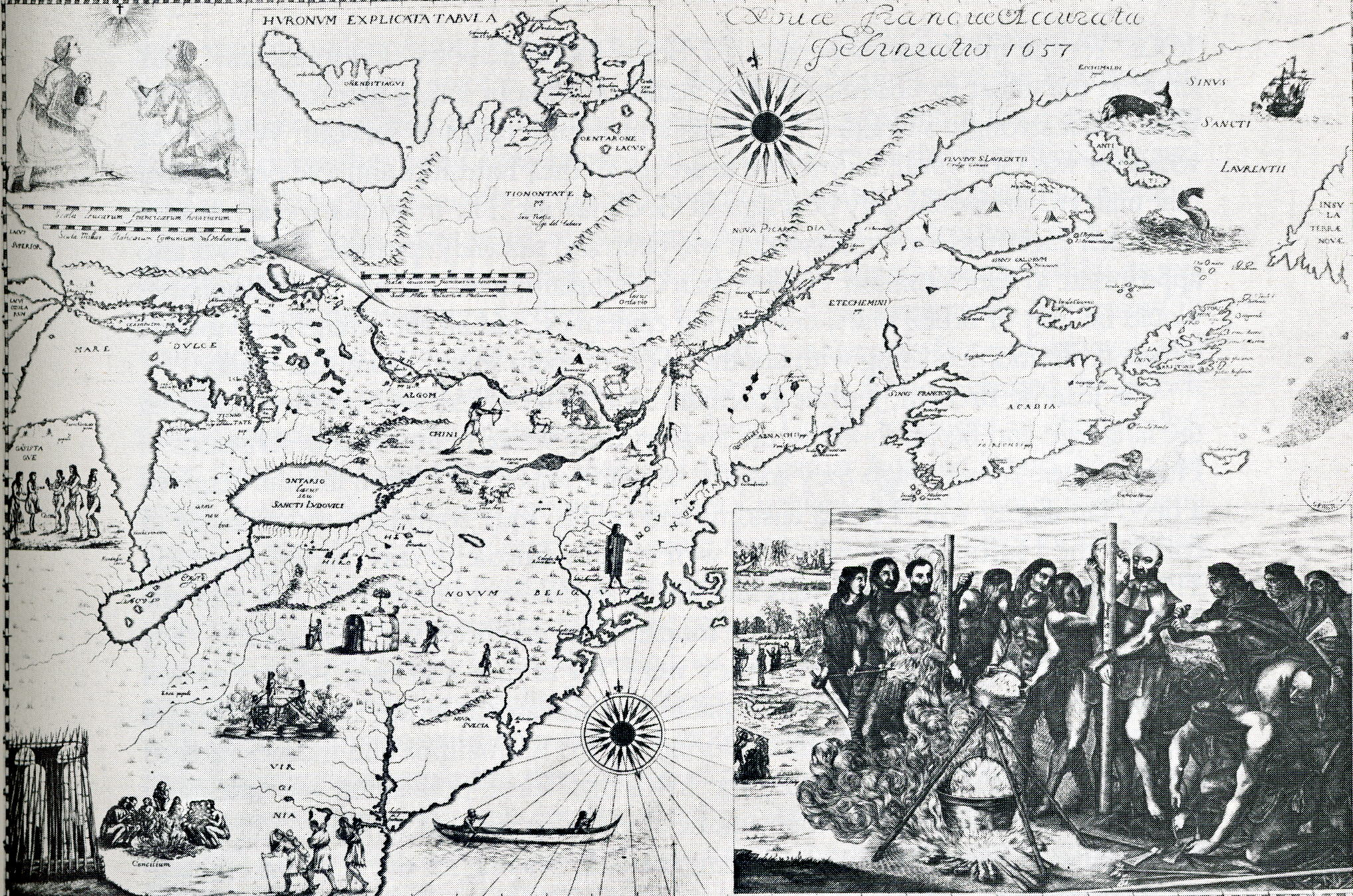
Bressani map of 1657 depicts the martyrdom of Jean de Brébeuf and Gabriel Lalemant

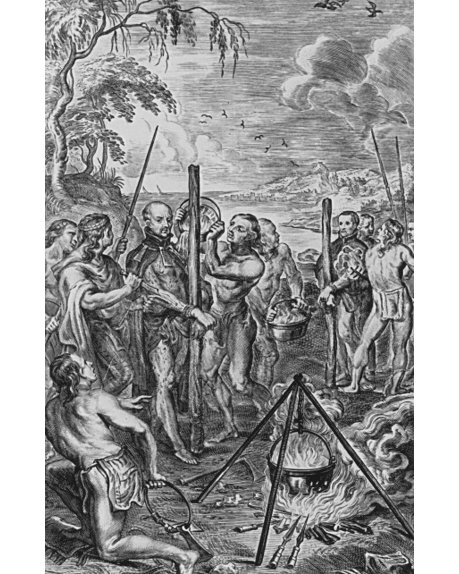
Jean de Brébeuf and Gabriel Lalemant stand ready for boiling water/fire "Baptism" and flaying by the Haudenosaunee in 1649.

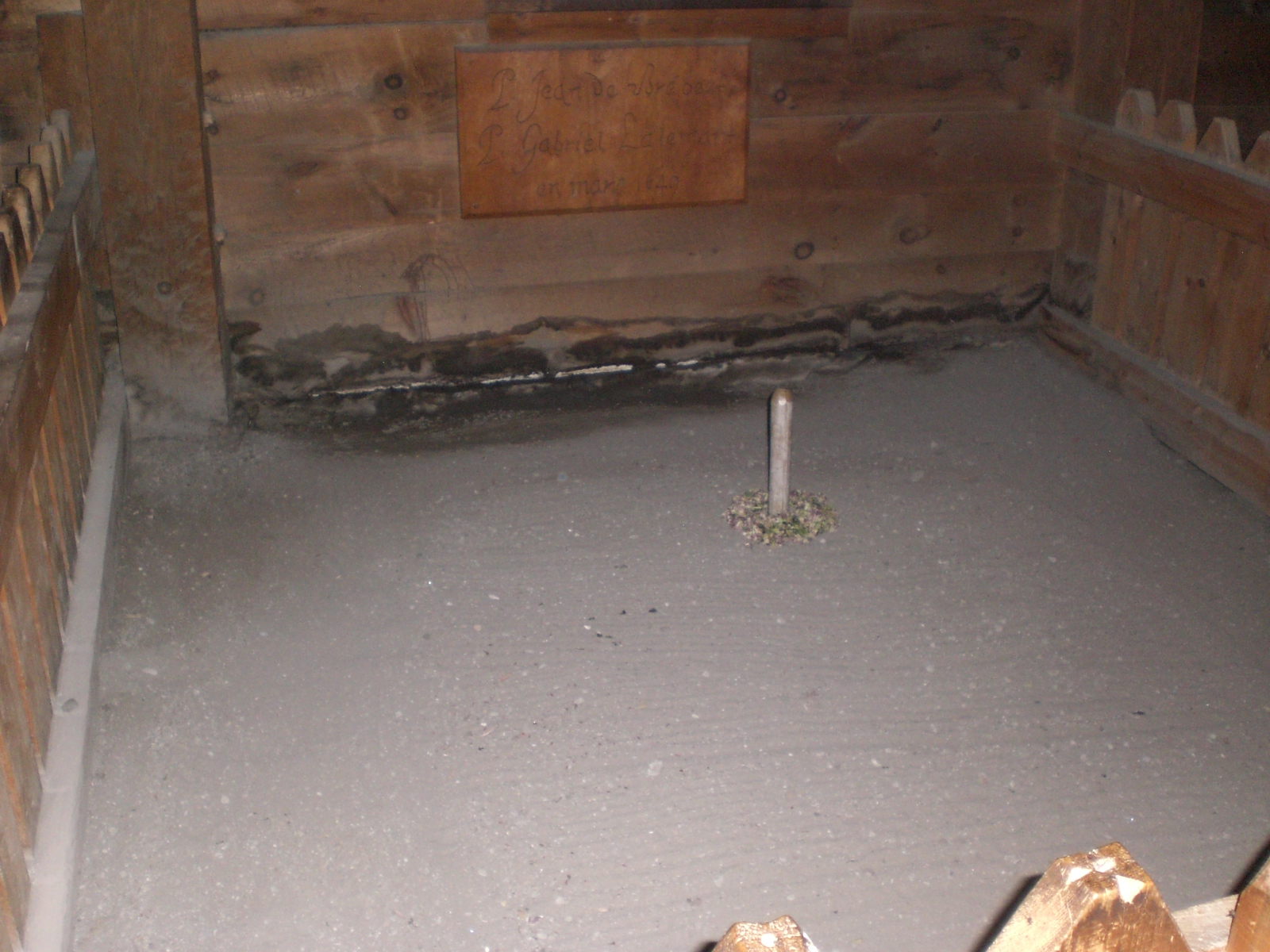
Gravesite of Brébeuf and Lalemant in Sainte-Marie among the Hurons

Brébeuf was killed at St. Ignace in Huronia on 16 March 1649. He had been taken captive with Gabriel Lalemant when the Haudenosaunee destroyed the Wendat mission village at Saint-Louis. The Haudenosaunee took the priests to the occupied village of Taenhatenteron (also known as St. Ignace), where they subjected the missionaries and native converts to ritual torture before killing them. The Haudenosaunee then ritually cannibalized his body.

Three priests had been killed in Mohawk country at Ossernenon in 1642 and 1646. Antoine Daniel had been killed in a similar Haudenosaunee raid in 1648. Charles Garnier was killed by Haudenosaunee in December 1649 in a Petun (Tobacco People) village, and Noël Chabanel was also martyred that year in the conflict between the Mohawk and other tribes. The Jesuits considered the priests' martyrdom as proof that the mission to the Native Americans was blessed by God and would be successful.

The Haudenosaunee tortured Brébeuf, pouring boiling water over his head in a mock baptism. Throughout the torture, he was reportedly more concerned for the fate of the other Jesuits and of the captive Native converts than for himself. Finally, his captors scalped him before roasting and eating his heart.

The Jesuits Christophe Regnault and Paul Ragueneau provided the two accounts of the deaths of Jean de Brébeuf and Gabriel Lalemant. According to Regnault, they learned of the tortures and deaths from Wendat refugee witnesses who had escaped from Saint-Ignace. Regnault went to see the bodies to verify the accounts, and his superior Ragueneau's account was based on his report. The main accounts of Brébeuf's death come from The Jesuit Relations. Jesuit accounts of his torture emphasize his stoic nature and acceptance, claiming that he suffered silently without complaining.

Potential martyrdom was a central component of the Jesuit missionary identity. Missionaries going to Canada knew they were at risk from harsh conditions, as well as from confronting alien cultures. They expected to die in the name of God; they believed the missionary life and its risks were a chance to save converts and be saved.

=== Relics, beatification and canonization ===
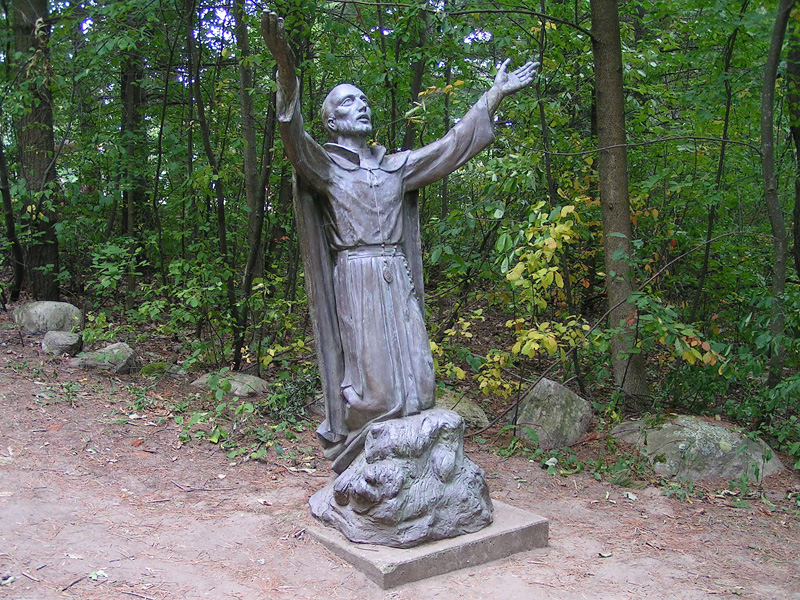
Statue of Jean de Brébeuf on the site of the Martyrs' Shrine, Midland, Ontario

Fathers Brébeuf and Lalement were recovered and buried together in a Sainte Marie cemetery. Brébeuf's relics later became important religious objects within Catholic New France. Historian Allan Greer notes that "his death seemed to fit the profile of a perfect martyr's end" and was preceded by what were considered religious signs pointing to correspondences with the Passion of Christ, which added to the significance of Brébeuf. On 21 March 1649, Jesuit inspectors found the bodies of Brébeuf and Lalement. In the late spring of 1649, Christophe Regnault prepared the skeletal remains of Brébeuf and Lalemant for transportation to Québec for safekeeping. Regnault boiled away the remaining flesh and reburied it in the mission church, scraped the bones and dried them in an oven, wrapped each relic in separate silk, deposited them in two small chests, and sent them to Québec.

Brébeuf's family later donated his skull in a silver reliquary to the Catholic church orders in Québec. It was held by the women of the Hôtel-Dieu de Québec and the Ursuline convent from 1650 until 1925 when the relics were moved to the Québec Seminary for a ceremony to celebrate Brébeuf's beatification. According to Catholic belief, these relics provide physical access to the influence of the saint of whom they are a part.

In 1652 Paul Raguenau went through the Relations and pulled out material relating to the martyrs of New France. He formalized this material in a document, to be used as the foundation of canonization proceedings, entitled Memoires touchant la mort et les vertus (des Pères Jesuits), or the Manuscript of 1652. The religious communities in New France considered the Jesuit martyrs as imitators of previous saints in the Catholic Church. In this sense, Brébeuf in particular, and others like him, reinforced the notion that "...Canada was a land of saints".

Catherine de Saint-Augustin said that Brébeuf appeared to her in a vision at the Québec Hôtel-Dieu while she was in a state of "mystical ecstasy", and he acted as her spiritual advisor. According to one account, Catherine de Saint-Augustin ground up part of Brébeuf's relic bone and gave it in a drink to a heretical and mortally ill man. It is said that the man was cured of his disease. In another instance, in 1660–61, a possessed woman was exorcised by the aid of one of Brébeuf's ribs, again while under the care of Catherine de Saint-Augustin. The exact circumstances of this event are disputed. Brébeuf's relics were also used by nuns who were treating wounded Huguenot (Protestant) soldiers, and they "reported that his assistance [bone slivers put in soldiers' drinks] helped rescue these patients from heresy".

Jean de Brébeuf was canonized by Pope Pius XI on 29 June 1930, and proclaimed one of the patron saints of Canada by Pope Pius XII on 16 October 1940. A contemporary newspaper account of the canonization declares: "Brébeuf, the 'Ajax of the mission', stands out among them [others made saints with him] because of his giant frame, a man of noble birth, of vigorous passions tamed by religion," describing both the man and his defining drive according to formal terms of hagiography.

The Jesuits of Canada and the United States announced a tour of Brébeuf's relics throughout both countries in 2024.

=== Modern era ===
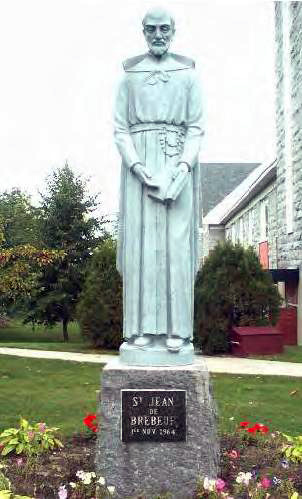
Statue of Jean de Brébeuf at Trois-Rivières

It is said that the modern name of the Native North American sport of lacrosse was first coined by Brébeuf who thought that the sticks used in the game reminded him of a bishop's crosier (crosse in French, and with the feminine definite article, la crosse).

He is buried in the Church of St. Joseph at the reconstructed Jesuit mission of Sainte-Marie among the Hurons across Highway 12 from the Martyrs' Shrine Catholic Church near Midland, Ontario. A plaque near the grave of Jean de Brébeuf and Gabriel Lalemant was unearthed during excavations at Ste Marie in 1954. The letters read "P. Jean de Brébeuf /brusle par les Iroquois /le 17 de mars l'an/1649" (Father Jean de Brébeuf, burned by the Iroquois, 17 March 1649).

In September 1984, Pope John Paul II prayed over Brébeuf's skull before fully joining in an outdoor ecumenical service on the grounds of the nearby Martyrs' Shrine. The service was attended by an estimated 75,000 and mixed pre-Christian first-nation ritual with Catholic liturgy.

Numerous schools are named in his honour:

- St. Jean Brebeuf School in Calgary, Alberta
- St. John Brebeuf Regional Secondary School in Abbotsford, British Columbia.
- St. John Brebeuf School in Winnipeg, Manitoba, which is part of the St. John Brebeuf Catholic Parish
- Brebeuf College School in Toronto, Ontario
- St. Jean de Brébeuf Catholic Secondary School in Hamilton, Ontario
- St. Jean de Brébeuf Catholic Elementary School in Brantford, Ontario (Closed 2009)
- St. Jean de Brebeuf Catholic High School in Vaughan, Ontario
- St. Jean Brebeuf Catholic School in Brampton, Ontario
- St. John Brebeuf Catholic School in Erin, Ontario, which is part of St. John Brebeuf Catholic Parish, part of the Roman Catholic Diocese in Hamilton, Ontario
- Collège Jean-de-Brébeuf in Montreal, Quebec
- École Jean-de-Brébeuf in Gatineau, Québec
- Brebeuf Jesuit Preparatory School in Indianapolis, Indiana

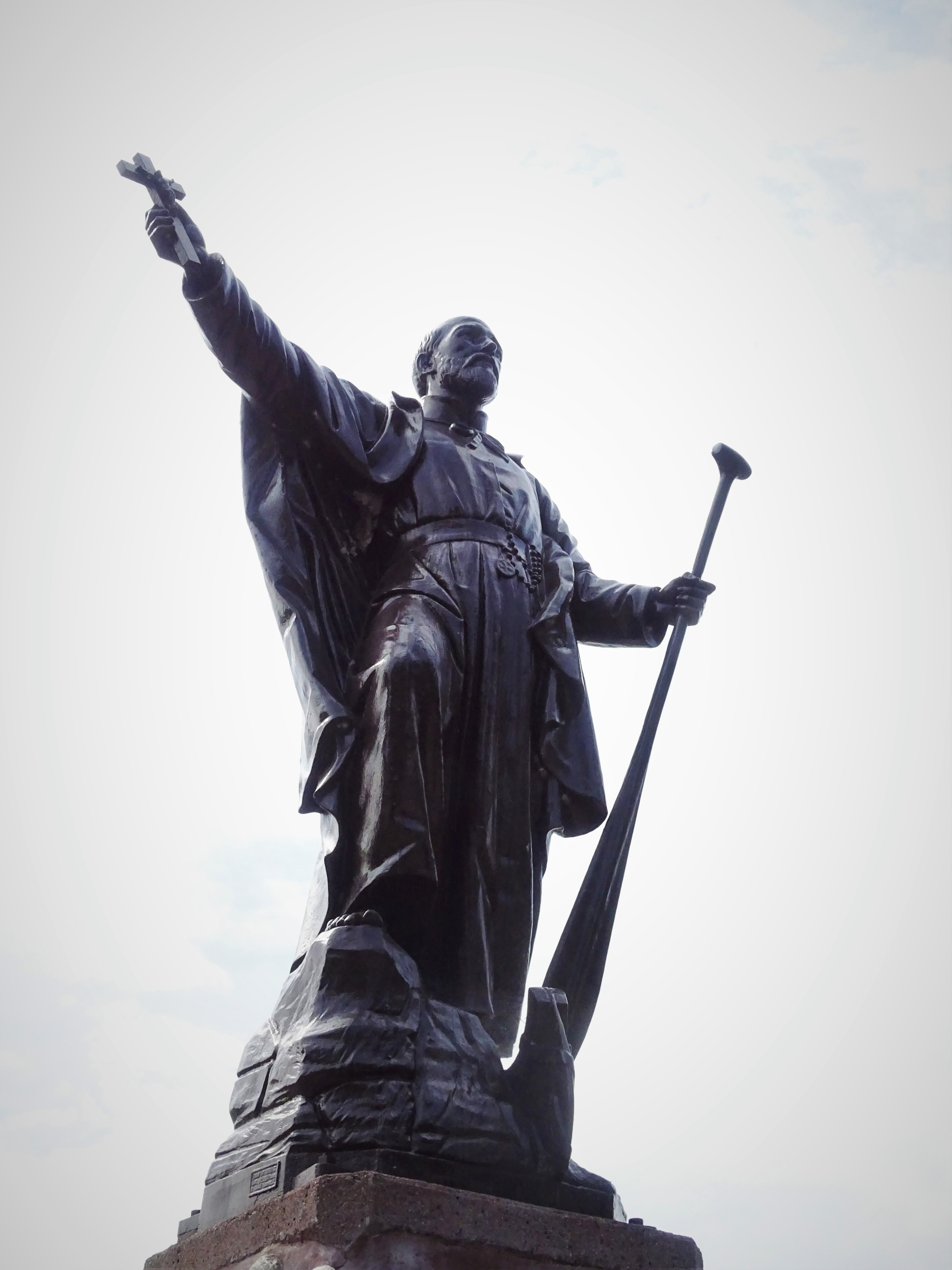
Statue in Parc Brébeuf, Gatineau

There is the Église St-Jean de Brebeuf in Sudbury, Ontario, and a St. John Brebeuf Catholic Church and its parish school in Niles, Illinois. There is also a unit at Camp Ondessonk in the Shawnee National Forest named after Jean de Brébeuf. The Catholic camp is named for all of the North American Martyrs and those who helped them.

The parish municipality of Brébeuf, Quebec, is named after him, as is rue de Brébeuf on the Plateau Mont-Royal in Montreal. Parc Brébeuf in the Hull region of Gatineau, Quebec is named in his honour and features a statue.

The character of Christophe in The Orenda, a 2013 novel by Joseph Boyden, is based on Jean de Brebeuf. The novel won the 2014 Canada Reads competition, a reality show with elimination-style voting on CBC Radio.

Jean de Brébeuf is the subject of Brébeuf and his Brethren, a blank-verse epic poem by the Canadian poet E. J. Pratt, FRSC, for which Pratt was awarded one of his three Governor General's Awards for Poetry in 1940.

== See also ==
- List of incidents of cannibalism
