= Gabriel Lalemant =

French Jesuit missionary and martyr (1610–1649)

Saint Gabriel Lalemant S.J.
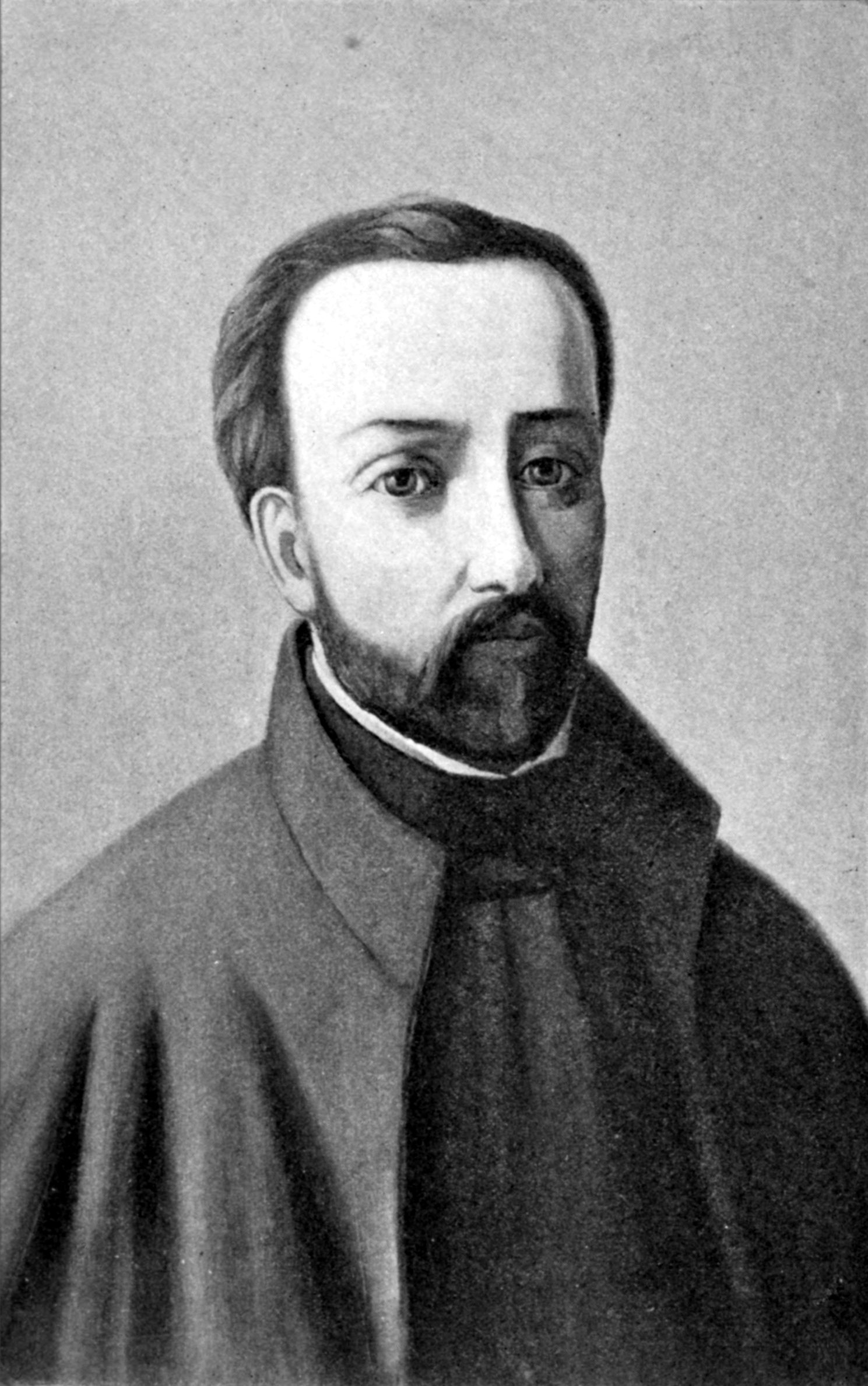

Missionary and Martyr of Canada
- Born: 3 October 1610; Paris, France
- Died: 17 March 1649 (aged 38); Saint Ignace (Waubaushene near Tay, Ontario)
- Venerated in: Roman Catholic Church
- Canonized: 29 June 1930 by Pope Pius XI
- Major shrine: Shrine of the Jesuit Martyrs, Midland, Ontario, Canada
- Feast: 26 September (Canada); 17 March (U.S.)

Gabriel Lalemant SJ (French pronunciation: [ɡabʁijɛl lalmɑ̃]; 3 October 1610 – 17 March 1649) was a French Jesuit missionary in New France beginning in 1646. Caught up in warfare between the Wendat and nations of the Haudenosaunee Confederacy, he was killed in St. Ignace by Mohawk warriors and is one of the eight Canadian Martyrs.

== Life ==
Gabriel Lalemant was born in Paris, 3 October 1610, the son of a French lawyer and his wife. He was the third of six children, five of whom entered religious life. Two of Gabriel's uncles served the Jesuits in New France: Charles Lalemant as the first Superior of the Jesuit missions in Canada, and Jérôme Lalemant as the Vicar-General of Quebec.

In 1630 Lalemant joined the Jesuits, and in 1632 he took the vow to devote himself to foreign missions. He taught at the Collège in Moulins from 1632 to 1635. He was at Bourges from 1635 to 1639 studying theology and was ordained there in 1638. He taught at three different schools, being professor of philosophy at Moulins. His repeated requests to go to New France were declined by his superiors, partly because of his poor health. Eventually, his uncle Jérôme, head of the Canadian mission, intervened on his behalf.

In September 1646 Gabriel arrived in Quebec, where he spent the first few months studying the Wendat language and customs. François-Joseph Bressani, a fellow missionary in New France, referred to him as a man of extremely frail constitution. For the first two years Gabriel worked in and around Quebec and the trading center of Trois Rivières (Three Rivers). In September 1648 he was sent to Wendake, the land of the Wendat (Huron), as an assistant to Jean de Brébeuf, and posted to the mission at Sainte-Marie among the Hurons. In February 1649 he replaced Noël Chabanel at the mission of Saint Louis.

In March 1649, while most of the Wendat warriors were away, 1,200 Haudenosaunee attacked the settlement of Saint Ignace. A few survivors escaped to warn the village of St. Louis. Its eighty warriors fought to delay the attackers, trying to enable the elderly, women, and children to flee. Lalemant and Brébeuf remained with the warriors and were captured and taken to the nearby mission at Saint Ignace. Both were tortured before being killed: Jean Brebeuf died on 16 March 1649, and Gabriel Lalemant died on 17 March 1649.

After the withdrawal of the Haudenosaunee war party from the area on 19 March, seven Frenchmen went to St. Ignace to retrieve the bodies of the Jesuits and Wendat. They returned them to Sainte-Marie where they were buried. Their relics are now housed at the Martyrs' Shrine in Midland, Ontario.

Lalemant was canonized by Pope Pius XI on 29 June 1930.

His surname may be spelled either Lallemant or Lalemant by different references.

== Gallery ==
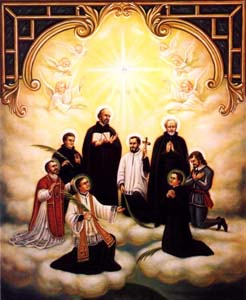
North American Martyrs

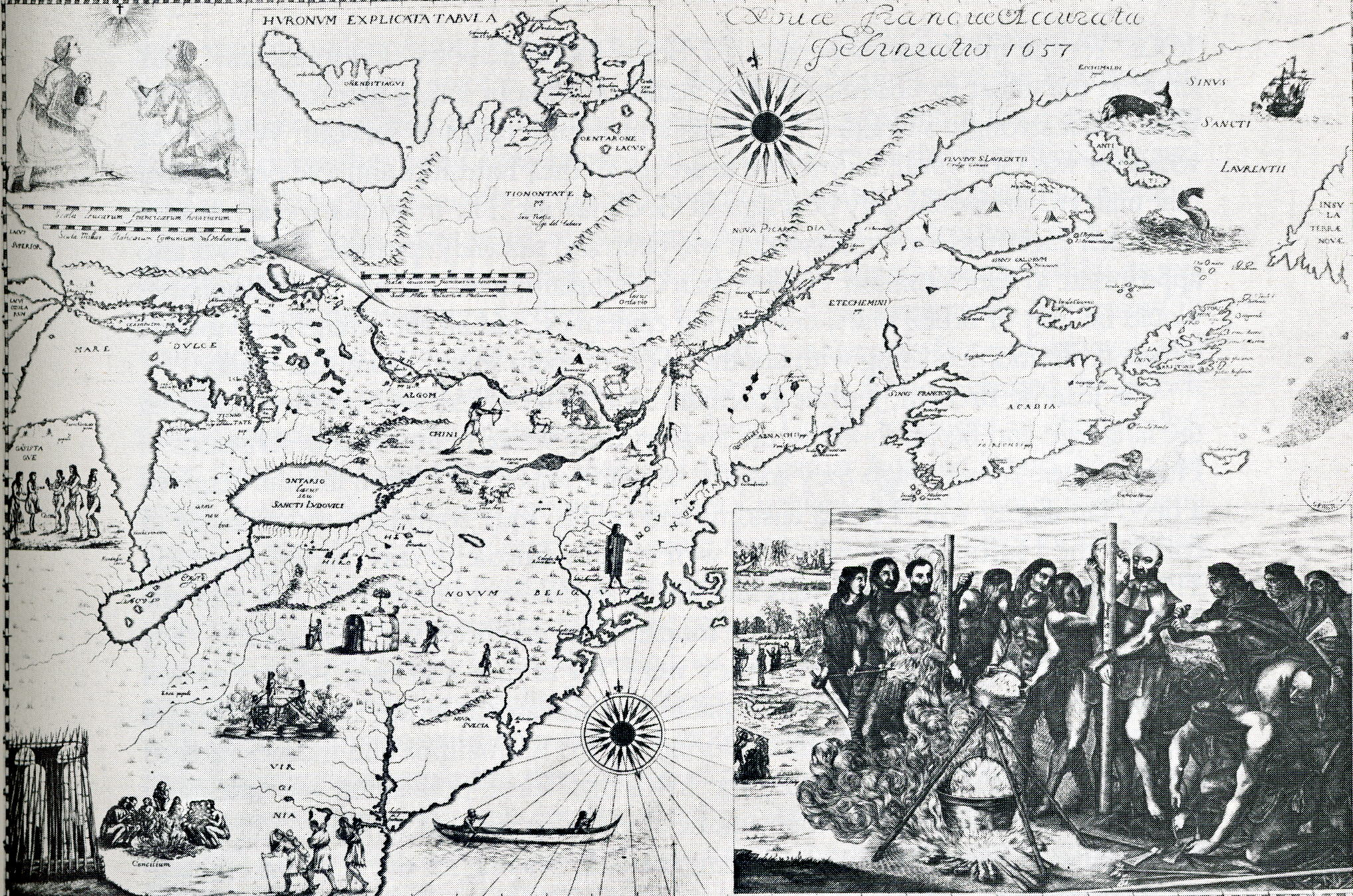
Bressani map of 1657 depicts the martyrdom of Jean de Brébeuf and Gabriel Lalemant

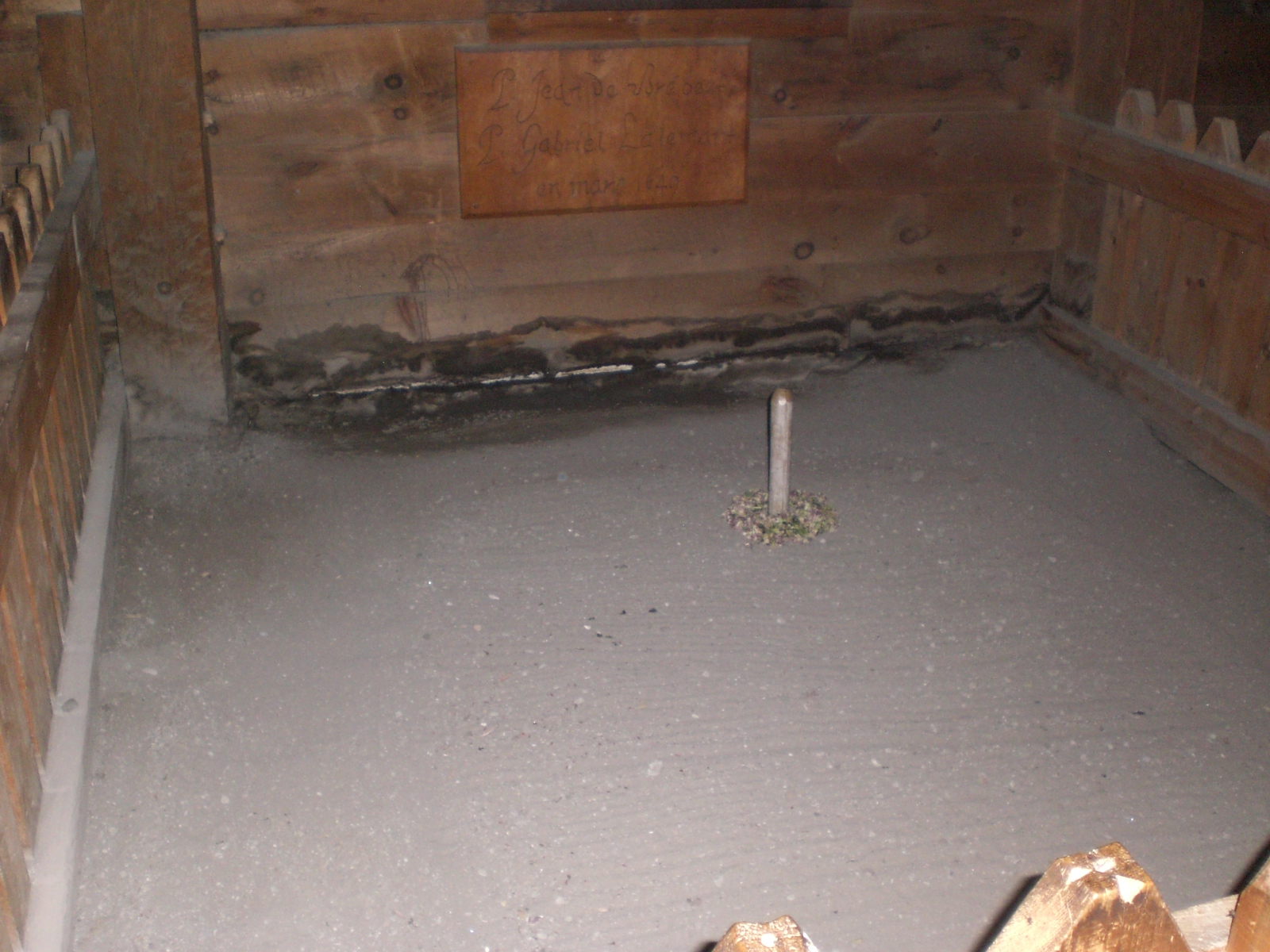
Grave site

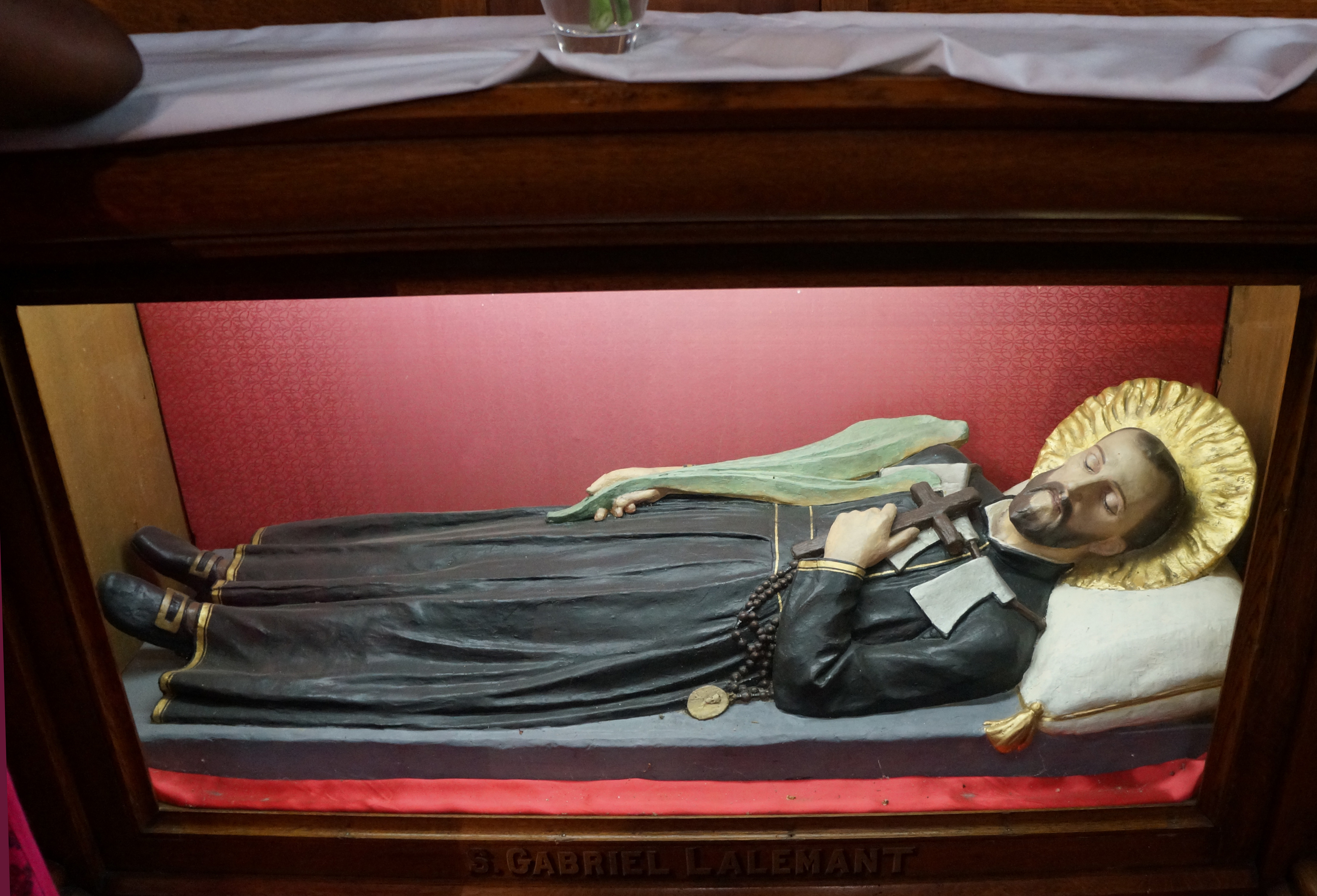
Statue at Shrine of the Canadian Martyrs

== See also ==
- Blessed Julian Maunoir
