= Tay, Ontario =

Tay
- Township municipality (lower-tier)
- Township of Tay
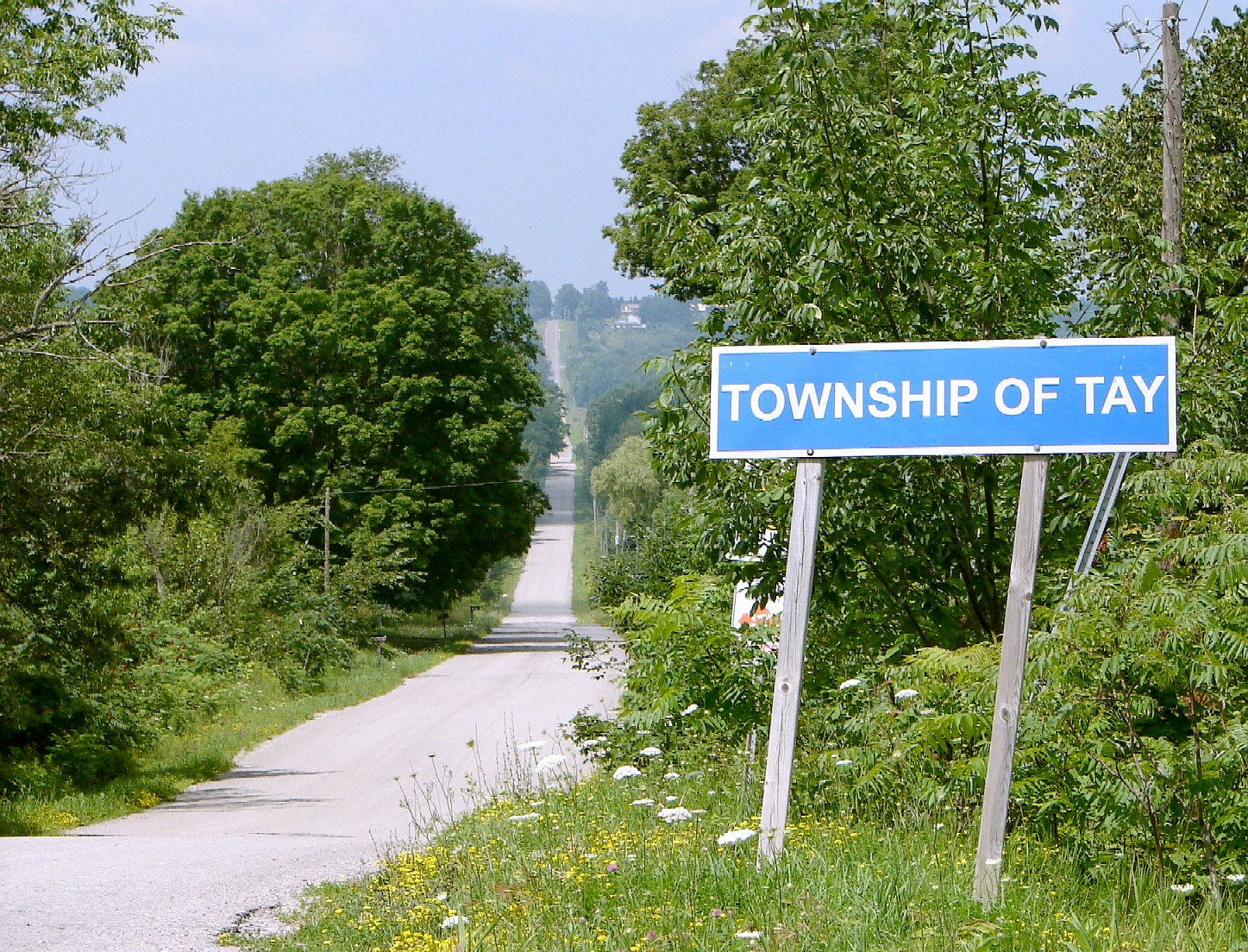

- Location within Simcoe County Location within Southern Ontario
- Coordinates: 44°44′08″N 79°46′11″W
- Country: Canada
- Province: Ontario
- County: Simcoe
- Incorporated: January 1, 1994

Government
  - Mayor: Ted Walker
  - MPs: Adam Chambers
  - MPPs: Jill Dunlop

Area
  - Land: 137.86 km^{2} (53.23 sq mi)

Population (2021)
  - Total: 11,091
  - Density: 80.5/km^{2} (208/sq mi)
- Time zone: UTC-5 (Eastern (EST))
  - Summer (DST): UTC-4 (EDT)
- Area codes: 705, 249, 683
- Website: www.tay.ca

Tay is a township municipality in Central Ontario, Canada, located in Simcoe County in the southern Georgian Bay region. The township was named in 1822 after a pet dog of Lady Sarah Maitland (1792–1873), wife of Sir Peregrine Maitland, Lieutenant Governor of Upper Canada. Two other adjoining townships were also named for her pet dogs, Tiny and Flos (now Springwater Township).

== History ==
The current territory of Tay was home to the Wendat towns of Teanaostataé (St. Louis), and Taenhatentaron (St. Ignace). Together with the nearby town of Teanaustayé (St. Joseph) in nearby Hillsdale they were destroyed by the Haudenosaunee (Iroquois) in 1648–1649. During this warfare, the Jesuits Jean de Brébeuf and Gabriel Lalemant were killed at Taenhatentaron.

Originally the township was incorporated part of Tiny and Tay United Townships on January 1, 1851, but became a separate township on January 4, 1869.

The Village of Victoria Harbour separated from Tay Township on December 31, 1910, followed by the Village of Port McNicoll on April 12, 1917. In 1965, Tay Township lost more territory when Midland Town annexed parts of it.

On January 1, 1994, under countywide municipal restructuring, the Villages of Port McNicoll and Victoria Harbour were amalgamated with Tay, while at the same time, Tay Township lost a portion to the newly formed Severn Township.

== Communities ==
The township comprises the villages and rural hamlets of:

- Ebenezer
- Elliots Corners
- Melduf
- Mertzs Corners
- Ogden's Beach
- Old Fort
- Paradise Point
- Port McNicoll
- Riverside
- Sturgeon Bay
- Triple Bay Park
- Vasey
- Victoria Harbour
- Waubaushene
- Waverley
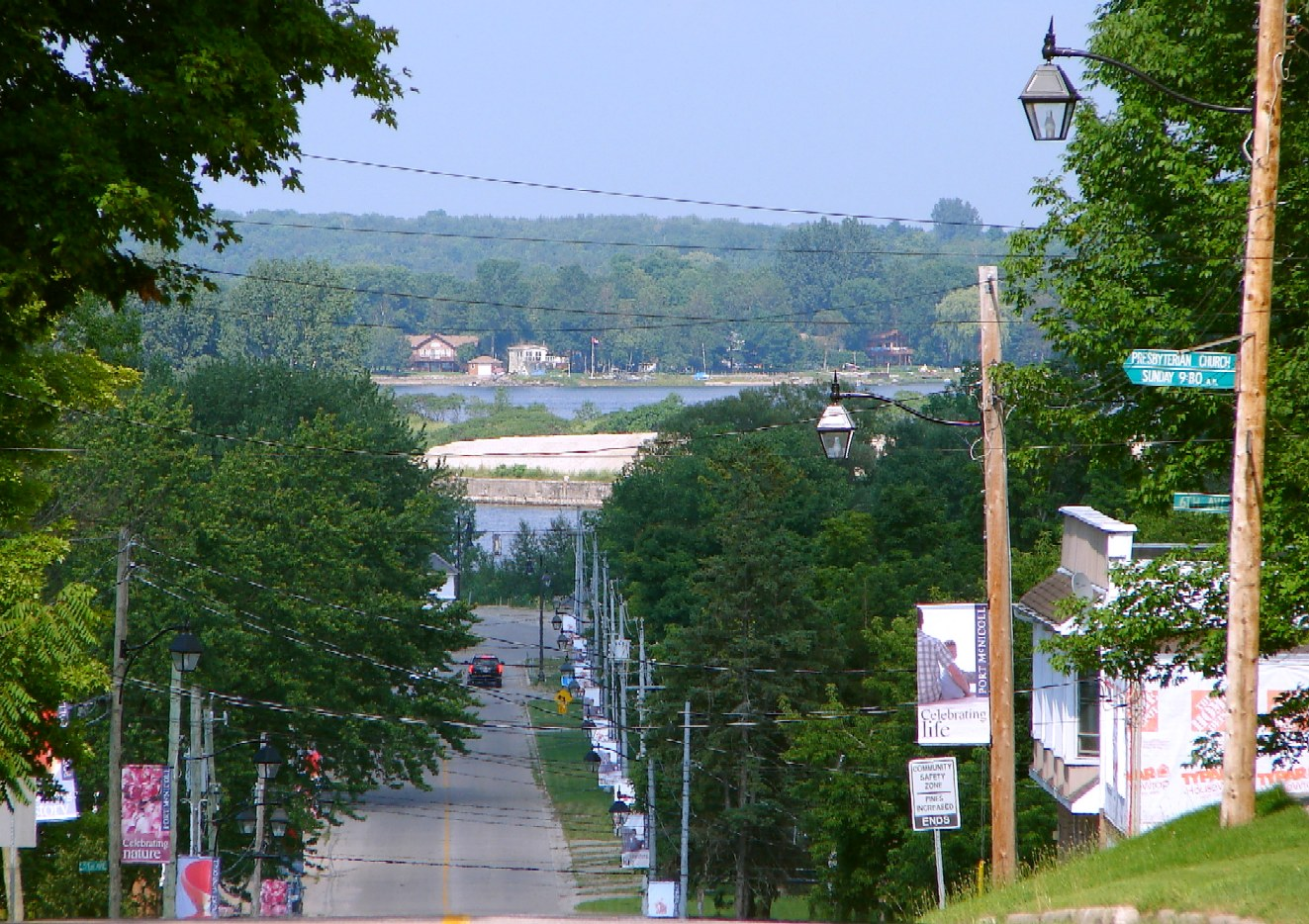
Port McNicoll

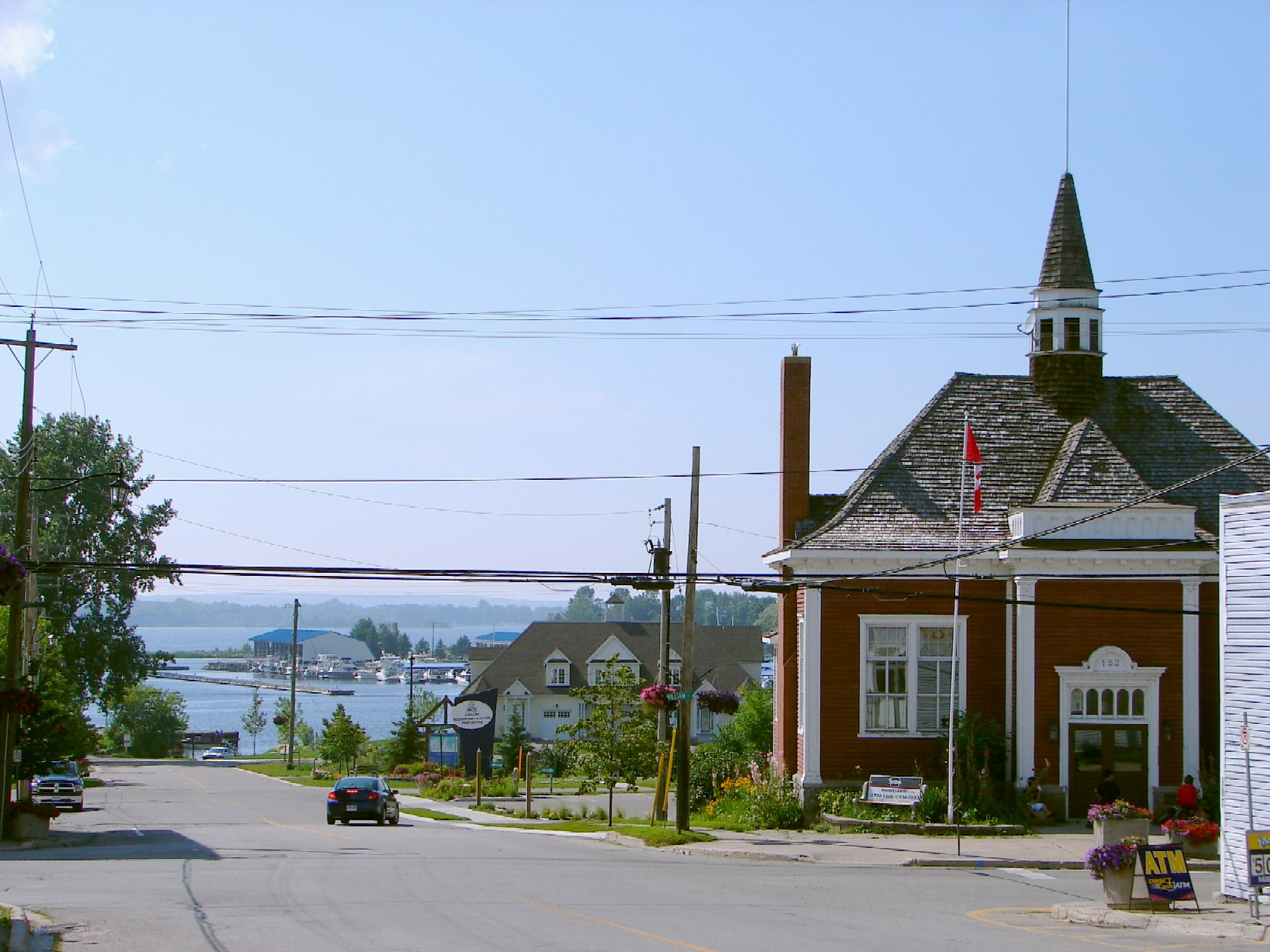
Victoria Harbour

== Demographics ==
In the 2021 Census of Population conducted by Statistics Canada, Tay had a population of 11,091 living in 4,535 of its 5,301 total private dwellings, a change of 10.5% from its 2016 population of 10,033. With a land area of 137.86 km^{2} (53.23 sq mi), it had a population density of 80.5/km^{2} (208.4/sq mi) in 2021.

Canada census – Tay, Ontario community profile

	2021	2016	2011
Population	11,091 (+10.5% from 2016)	10,033 (+3.1% from 2011)	9,736 (-0.1% from 2006)
Land area	137.86 km^{2} (53.23 sq mi)	139.07 km^{2} (53.70 sq mi)	139.00 km^{2} (53.67 sq mi)
Population density	80.5/km^{2} (208/sq mi)	72.1/km^{2} (187/sq mi)	70.0/km^{2} (181/sq mi)
Median age	49.2 (M: 48.4, F: 50.0)	48.7 (M: 47.9, F: 49.4)
Private dwellings	5,301 (total) 4,535 (occupied)	4,931 (total)	5,049 (total)
Median household income	$82,000	$65,190

References: 2021 2016 2011

Historical census populations – Tay, Ontario

Year	Pop.	±%
1871	1,629	—
1881	2,993	+83.7%
1891	4,714	+57.5%
1901	4,453	−5.5%
1911	5,245	+17.8%
1921	3,159	−39.8%
1931	2,770	−12.3%
1941	2,649	−4.4%

Year	Pop.	±%
1951	2,793	+5.4%
1956	3,105	+11.2%
1961	3,670	+18.2%
1966	3,187	−13.2%
1971	4,321	+35.6%
1976	6,354	+47.0%
1981	6,299	−0.9%
1986	6,547	+3.9%

Year	Pop.	±%
1991	7,017	+7.2%
1996	9,044	+28.9%
2001	9,162	+1.3%
2006	9,748	+6.4%
2011	9,736	−0.1%
2016	10,033	+3.1%
2021	11,091	+10.5%

Population counts are not adjusted for boundary changes.
Source: Statistics Canada

== See also ==
- List of townships in Ontario
