= Charles Garnier (missionary) =

French Jesuit missionary and martyr (1606–1649)

Saint Charles Garnier S.J.
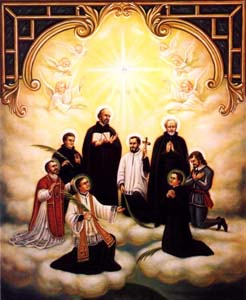
- North American Martyrs
- Born: May 25, 1606; Paris, France
- Died: December 7, 1649 (aged 43); Tobacco Nation country near Collingwood, Ontario, Canada
- Venerated in: Catholic Church
- Canonized: 1930 by Pope Pius XI
- Major shrine: Shrine of the Canadian Martyrs, Midland, Ontario, Canada
- Feast: October 19

Charles Garnier, SJ (French pronunciation: [ʃaʁl ɡaʁnje]; May 25, 1606 – December 7, 1649) was a Jesuit missionary working in New France. He was killed by Haudenosaunee in a Tionontati (Petun) village on December 7, 1649.

== Biography ==
The son of a secretary to King Henri III of France, Garnier was born in Paris in 1606. He attended the Collège de Clermont in Paris and joined the Jesuit seminary in Clermont in September 1624.

After his novitiate, he returned to the College of Clermont as Prefect. After finishing his studies in rhetoric and philosophy, he spent two years teaching at the College of Eu as a teacher. Completing years of studies in language, culture, and theology, he was ordained as a priest in 1635. Initially forbidden by his father from travelling to Canada, where he would face almost certain death as a missionary, he was eventually allowed to go. Embarking on March 25, 1636, he described the crossing in a letter to his father,

We gave Viaticum to a sailor who had fallen from the top of the mizzenmast to the deck. He was well-disposed to die. However, as I saw him in great discomfort, unable to sleep, I gave him my cabin and went in with Father Chastelain in his, but the sick man found this cabin too stuffy so the next day I occupied it again but left him my mattress so he could sleep even in the midst of the cannons. Hearing this, the Captain made me take one of his.

He reached the colony of New France in June. He travelled immediately to the Huron mission with a fellow Jesuit, Pierre Chastellain. By early August, he had arrived among the Nipissings.

He served for the rest of his life as a missionary among the Wendat (Huron) and never returned to France. The Wendat nicknamed him Ouracha, or "rain-giver", after his arrival was followed by a drought-ending rainfall. He was greatly influenced by a fellow missionary, Jean de Brébeuf, and was known as the "lamb" to Brebeuf's "lion". In 1639 and 1640, he wintered in the land of the Petun. From 1641 to 1646, Garnier was at the Saint-Joseph mission.

There were raids between Haudenosaunee and Wendat forces. When he learned that Brébeuf and Lalemant had been killed in March 1649 by Haudenosaunee after a raid on a Wendat village, Garnier knew he too might soon die. On December 7, 1649, he was killed by musket fire from the Haudenosaunee during an attack on the Petun village in which he was living.

Garnier was canonized in 1930 by Pope Pius XI with the seven other Canadian Martyrs (also known as the North American Martyrs). His feast day is October 19.

== See also ==
- Shrine of the North American Martyrs

== Bibliography ==
- Larivière, Florian (1979) [1966]. "Garnier, Charles (Ouracha)". In Brown, George Williams (ed.). Dictionary of Canadian Biography. Vol. I (1000–1700) (online ed.). University of Toronto Press.
- "De la prise et désolation de la mission de Saint-Jean, par les Iroquois, et de la mort du P. Charles Garnier, qui y était en mission" and "Abrégé de la vie du Père Charles Garnier," in ACSM, "Mémoires touchant la mort et les vertus des pères Isaac Jogues . . ." (Ragueneau), repr. APQ Rapport, 1924–25, 76–85.
- APQ Rapport, 1929–30, 1–43, "Lettres de Saint Charles Garnier." JR (Thwaites), XXXV, 118–44; et passim. Positio causae.
- Florian Larivière, La vie ardente de Saint Charles Garnier (Montréal, 1957).
- Rochemonteix, Les Jésuites et la Nouvelle-France au XVII^{e} siècle, I, 97–100, 409–18.
