= List of archaeological sites in Whitchurch–Stouffville =

This is a list of archaeological sites in Whitchurch–Stouffville, Ontario, Canada: Both the Trent University Site Designation number and the Borden System archaeological designations are given.

Late Ontario Iroquois (1400 AD - 1650 AD)

- Aurora (or Old Fort) Site (7Yk27; BaGu-27); 3.4 ha
  - Location: Lots 14 and 15, Concession 6, West half. 44°00'N 79°20'W
  - Date: 1550-1600 AD
- Aurora Isolated Site (7Yk24; BaGu-11)
  - Location: Lot 15, Concession 6, West half. 44°00'N 79°20'W
- Chalk Site (7Yk20; BaGu-8)
  - Location: Lot 16, Concession 4, East half. 44°00'N 79°22'W
- Clark Lake Site (7Yk23; BaGu-10)
  - Location: Lot 14, Concession 5, East half. Entrance: 44°00'N 79°20'W
- Foote Site (7Yk26; AlGt-158)
  - Location: East side of McCowan Road, north of Stouffville Road. 43°57'N 79°18'W
- Horton-Devins Site (7Yk22; BaGu-9)
  - Location: East of Warden Avenue, north of Vandorf Sideroad. 44°01'N 79°20'W
- Hoshel-Huntly Site (7Yk21; AlGu-15)
  - Location: West of Warden Avenue, on the south side of Vandorf Sideroad. 44°00'N 79°22'W
- Mantle Site (AlGt-334); 4.2 ha; 90% excavated
  - Location: Immediately west of Byers Pond Way, and south-west of Lost Pond Crescent. 43°57'49.9"N 79°14'12"W
  - Date: 1500-1550 AD
- Preston Site (7Yk18; AlGu-9)
  - Location: Lot 13, Concession 4, West half. 43°59'N 79°22'W
- Ratcliff (or Radcliffe) Site (7Yk25; AlGt-157); 2.8 ha
  - Location: Lot 9, Concession 8, West half. 43°59'N 79°W
  - Date: 1550-1600 AD
- Van Nostrand-Wright (or Vandorf) Site (7Yk19; A1Gu-13); 4.3 ha; limited excavation
  - Location: Lots 14 and 15, Concession 4, West half; overlooking Van Nostrand Lake to the north-east. 43°59'N 79°23'W
  - Date: 1550-1600 AD

== See also ==
- Whitchurch–Stouffville
- Draper Site, Pickering, Ontario
