= Taber Hill =

Wendat (Huron) burial mound in Toronto, Ontario

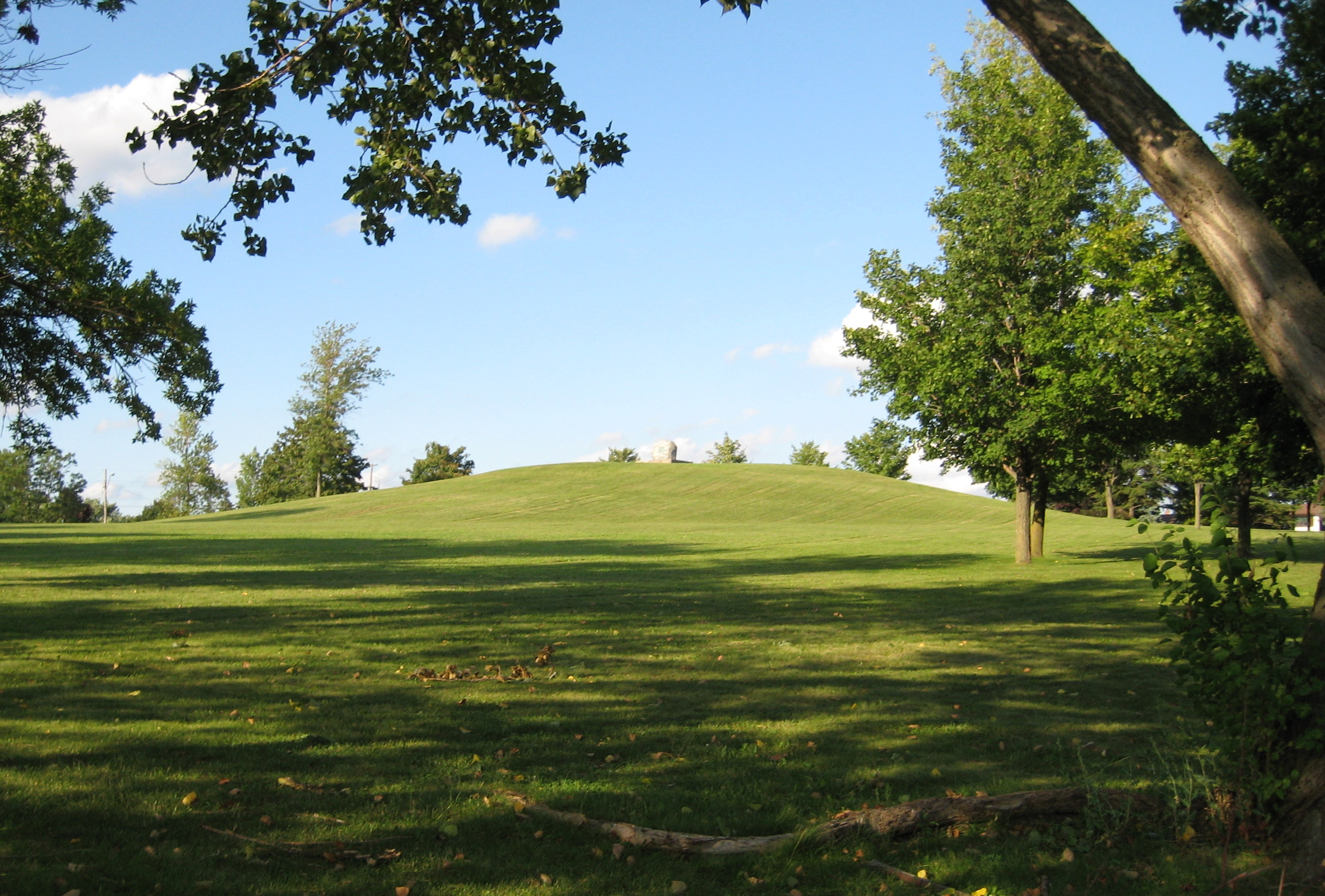
- Taber Hill
- Interactive map of Taber Hill

Details
- Established: Post Woodland period
- Location: Toronto, Ontario
- Country: Canada
- Coordinates: 43.759°N 79.235°W
- Type: Wendat (Huron) burial mound (ossuary)
- Style: Burial mound
- No. of graves: 523

Taber Hill, also spelled Tabor Hill, is a Wendat (Huron) burial mound in Toronto, Ontario. It is located northeast of the intersection of Lawrence Avenue and Bellamy Road in Scarborough. It is estimated to date from the 14th century and contain the skeletons of over 500 Wendat. It is believed to be the only First Nations ossuary protected as a cemetery in Canada.

== Site ==
The ossuary/cemetery covers an area of 0.342 hectares (0.85 acres) and is shaped as a mound. The ossuary was eventually found to be about fifty feet long, seven feet wide, and one foot deep. Kenyon first estimated that 472 individuals were buried there. The site was first estimated to date to circa 1250 AD. Further studies of the site determined that the site was not one of the Six Nations, but rather one of the Wendat peoples, who are related to the Six Nations. The total number of buried skeletons was revised to be 523, and the burial mound was estimated to date to the 14th century. The skeletons were buried in a ritual manner consistent with the Wendat Feast of Souls.

In the same year that the ossuary was found, an Iroquoian village site was excavated west of this location at Brimley Road where it crosses West Highland Creek. The two sites are believed to be linked. Another, larger Wendat village site (known as the "Alexandra Site") was found in 2000 just north of L'Amoreaux Park (North) northwest of McNicoll and Kennedy. An estimate of the number of persons residing in the larger site is between 800 and 1000. Archaeologists who studied the larger site believe it is possible the three sites may be linked. Other sites exist within the Rouge River valley (the Elliot site, Robb site, the Fairty ossuary, the Milroy site and Draper site) that are also Iroquoian.

== History ==
The cemetery was discovered on August 17, 1956, when a steam shovel was in the process of demolishing the 60 feet (18 m) high hill. The soil was being transported for use in constructing an overpass for Highway 401 and the cleared site was then intended to be turned into the Bendale suburban subdivision. After digging some one hundred feet into the hill the workers found a large collection of human bones. Work immediately stopped at the site to allow for an expert investigation. Scarborough Reeve Gus Harris first announced that the found bones were not of Indian (indigenous) origin due to a lack of artifacts and were instead a disposal of bones or mass burial of a cholera epidemic of 1870.

Royal Ontario Museum assistant curator of ethnology Walter Kenyon supervised an archaeological examination of the site. The examination found a second burial pit. Kenyon described the larger pit as "the deepest ossuary I have ever seen or heard of" and "the most significant ethnological discovery in Canada's history."

The site was declared a historical site on August 22, 1956, by Bryan Cathcart, Ontario Minister of Travel and Publicity, invoking the Protection of Archeological and Historic Sites Act. The site was then put under police guard to prevent loss of artifacts after a copper bead was taken away by a child. The Government of Ontario purchased the 35 acres (14 ha) site, exchanging it for land elsewhere in the area.

Representatives of the Haudenosaunee Six Nations were invited to supervise a Feast of the Dead reburial ceremony. The ceremony was held over three days from October 19–21, supervised by Chief Joseph Logan and was attended by more than 200 indigenous people and several thousand local residents and visitors. The Haudenosaunee ritual was by tradition a closed ceremony and some Haudenosaunee did not attend for that reason. A new hole was dug for re-interment of the bones five deep and the bones re-interred with wolf pelts on top. A banquet was subsequently held at the Scarborough Golf Club, where Jack Pickersgill, then the federal minister of citizenship and immigration addressed the crowd. Haudenosaunee representatives held annual Feast of the Dead ceremonies from 1957 until 1966.

In 1961, a memorial was installed at the top of the mound. It has a Scarborough Township historical plaque on one side. The other side has a plaque with a prayer incorrectly attributed to "White Cloud" and a statement that reads "Approved by Iroquois Council 3-3-60" - however, the origin of this prayer is the Lakota Nation, translated to English by Chief Yellow Lark in 1887 and published in the collection Native American Prayers, by the Episcopal Church. The site is designated as a cemetery and is administered by the City of Toronto government. The surrounding area is known as Tabor Hill Park. While designated a cemetery, there have been concerns that the area is often used as a park.
