= 1609 in Quebec =

Events from the year 1609 in Quebec.

== Events ==
- The first group of French settlers in New France experience a harsh first winter. Scurvy, smallpox and the cold temperature result in the death of twenty people out of the 28 colonists.
- In the summer, Samuel de Champlain established alliances between the French colonists and the neighbouring First Nations. The French ally with the Wendat (whom they call Huron) and the Algonquin living along the St. Lawrence River against the Haudenosaunee.
- The first battle between the French and the Haudenosaunee takes place at Ticonderoga, in present-day New York. The Haudenosaunee flee when encountering French gunpowder weapons.
- Together with nine French soldiers and 300 natives, Samuel de Champlain explores and maps the Richelieu River and Lake Champlain

== Deaths ==
71 per cent of the French population in New France dies during the winter.
