= Jesuit Missions amongst the Huron =

Between 1634 and 1655, the Jesuits established a home and a settlement in New France along the Saint Lawrence River. They soon moved deeper into the colony’s territory in order to live with and convert the local Wendat (Huron) population. During this time, however, their missionary efforts were fraught with disappointment and frustration. In other colonies, such as in Latin America, the Jesuit missions had found a more eager and receptive audience to Christianity, the result of a chaotic atmosphere of violence and conquest. But in New France, where French authority and coercive powers did not extend far and where French settlement was sparse, the Jesuits found conversion far more difficult. Nevertheless, the French missionary settlements were integral to maintaining political, economic, and military ties with the Wendat and other native peoples in the region. The contact between the two had important consequences in lifestyle, social and cultural attitudes, as well as in spiritual practice. The French Jesuits and Wendat found they had to negotiate their religious, social, and cultural differences in order to accommodate one another.

The Wendat lived modest lives, but nevertheless, before their encounter "with the French, the Huron knew of no culture that they had reason to believe was materially more successful than their own." The Wendat traded with the French and other tribes for food, European tools, and other supplies, which proved to be crucial to their survival. But the Wendat mainly practiced a form of sedentary agriculture, which appealed to the French, who believed that cultivating the land and making it productive was a sign of civilization. The Wendat women worked primarily with crops, such as maize, which they planted, tended and harvested. Entire villages would relocate once the fertile soil in a certain area was depleted after several seasons of use. Women also gathered plants and berries, cooked, and made clothing and baskets. Women did not participate in the autumn hunts, however. Men cleared the fields, hunted deer, fished, and erected their multi-family longhouses. Men were also responsible for the defense of the village and would fight during wartime. For instance, the Haudenosaunee and the Wendat fought many times amongst themselves. Revenge was the major reason Wendat went to war, but the decision to resort to violence was made only after lengthy discussion.

The Wendat government system was very different from that in Europe. One major difference was that individuals belonged to a matrilineage. Furthermore, Wendat peoples would discuss an issue together until a general consensus was reached. Their government was based on clan segments and each segment had two headmen: a civil leader and a war chief. Wendat law centered around four major areas: murder, theft, witchcraft (of which both men and women could be accused), and treason. The Wendat did not have a religion similar to that of Europeans; Rather, "the Huron lived in a world in which everything that existed, including man-made things, possessed souls and were immortal." Dreams and visions were a part of Wendat religion, influencing almost all major decisions.

== Methods of Conversion ==
The Jesuit missionaries who came to New France in the seventeenth century aimed to both convert native peoples such as the Wendat to Christianity and also to instill European values within them. Jesuit planners believed that by creating European social institutions and patterns, conversion would become easier: linking European lifestyle as the foundation for proper conceptions of Christian spirituality.

Compared to other native populations in the region such as the hunter-gatherer Innu or Mi’kmaq peoples, the Wendat already fit in relatively well with the Jesuits’ ideas of stable societies. For instance, the Wendat had semi-permanent settlements and actively practiced agriculture—with maize as their major staple crop. Nonetheless, the Jesuits often found it hard to bridge the cultural divide and their religious and social conversion efforts often met with stiff resistance from the Wendat.

War and violent conflict between tribes, on the other hand, helped create a far more receptive audience to Christianity and increased the Jesuits' potential for successful conversion. Nevertheless, natives were also converted by other means. Father Paul Le Jeune advocated fear tactics to convert natives to Christianity, such as showing them frightening pictures of Hell or drawing upon the natives’ own fears, such as losing a child, in order to create horrifying mental images and encourage the natives to consider their own mortality and salvation.

=== Accommodation ===
Jesuits often used existing native customs and social structures in order to enter and settle in villages and convert the people there. Thus, missionary methods of conversion often juxtaposed aspects of Christian practice with certain elements of Wendat culture. For instance, missionaries carefully studied native languages and spoke to the Wendat about Christianity on their own terms. They translated hymns, prayers such as the Pater Noster, and other liturgical texts into the Wendat language, which they would then recite in front of large groups. De Religione was written entirely in Wendat in the seventeenth century. This book was intended to be a guide to Christianity for the Wendat. The lengthy religious tract covered information on Christian religious practice such as baptism, a discussion on different types of souls, Christian conceptions of the afterlife, and even the reasoning behind the Jesuits’ missionary work itself.

The type of Catholicism that the Jesuits preached to Wendat was radicalized by decades of violent conflict in France and could be intolerant of non-Catholic spirituality. This Catholicism demanded an all-or-nothing commitment from converts, which meant that the Wendat were sometimes forced to choose between their Christian faith and their traditional spiritual beliefs, family structures, and community ties.

At first, many Wendat were interested in the Jesuits’ stories of the origin of the universe and about the life and teachings of Jesus Christ and some were baptized. Others—though curious about the European faith—were prevented from baptism by the Jesuits out of the concern that these Wendat were dangerously combining traditional practices with Christian concepts. Finally, a group of traditionalists, preferring Wendat methods of conciliation and dialogue, were disquieted by the confrontational nature of Jesuit preaching and conversion methods. They feared the consequences of converts breaking all their ritual, familial, and communal ties, and so, began to actively oppose the missionary program.

=== Christianity and Wendat’s Social Weakening ===
The factionalism dividing Christian converts and traditionalists seriously weakened the Wendat confederacy in the 1640s. Due to Jesuit insistence on emphasizing the incompatibility of Christianity and traditional spirituality rather than noting convergences, Wendat Christians tended to distance themselves from the traditional practices of their people and threatened ties that had once bound communities together. Converts refused to participate in shared feasts, Christian women rejected traditionalist suitors, they carefully observed Catholic fasts, and they also withheld Christian remains from the Feast of the Dead, which was an important ritual of disinterment and collective reburial. The Jesuit missionary Jean de Brébeuf described the spectacle in The Jesuit Relations, explaining that,

Engraving of the Huron Feast of the Dead.

Many of them think we have two souls, both of them being divisible and material, and yet both reasonable. One of them separates itself from the body at death yet remains in the cemetery until the Feast of the Dead, after which it either changes into a dove, or according to a common belief, it goes away at once to the village of souls. The other is more attached to the body and, in a sense, provides information to the corpse. It remains in the grave after the feast and never leaves, unless someone bears it again as a child.

The Feast combined notions of Wendat spirituality, the life of souls, and a community engaged in life, death, and reproduction. The Christian refusal to participate in key community rituals such as this was a direct threat to traditional spiritual and physical unity.

=== Religion and Illness ===
Physical violence, the widespread dispersal of the remaining people, and waves of Old World diseases such as smallpox, influenza, and measles, to which the native populations had no built-up immunity, meant that the Wendat population was heavily afflicted. When these epidemics struck, however, many Wendat blamed the Jesuits.

Within the religious context, the Jesuits had found themselves in competition with native spiritual leaders, and so often presented themselves as shamans capable of influencing human health through prayer. Aboriginal conceptions of shamanistic power were ambivalent and it was believed that shamans were capable of doing both good and ill. As a result, the Wendat easily attributed their boons as well as their problems of disease, illness, and death to the Jesuit presence.

Many Wendat were particularly suspicious of the rite of baptism. The Jesuits frequently performed surreptitious baptisms on ailing and dying infants, in the belief that these children would be sent to heaven since they did not have the time to sin. Similarly, deathbed baptisms became common during these times of widespread disease. But the Wendat interpreted baptism as a sinister piece of sorcery that marked an individual for death. Resistance to the Jesuit missions grew as the Wendat took repeated blows to their population and their political, social, cultural, and religious heritage.

=== Conceptions of Martyrdom ===
The Jesuits had initially envisioned a relatively easy and efficient conversion of native people who supposedly lacked religion and would therefore eagerly adopt Catholicism. Yet they found that this was far more easily said than done. Combined with the harsh Canadian environment and the threat of physical violence against the missionaries at the hands of native peoples grew, the Jesuits began interpreting their difficulties of "carrying the cross" from a metaphorical to an increasingly literal level as preparation for their eventual martyrdom. There was a rhetorical shift as the Jesuits recast themselves from triumphant evangelists to living martyrs, who were despised by those they had come to rescue. By the 1640s the Jesuits had come to anticipate violence and believed they were condemned to suffer and die while maintaining hope for their eventual spiritual triumph by linking their deaths to the suffering of Christ. The first Jesuit superior of the New France mission, Father Paul Le Jeune concluded,

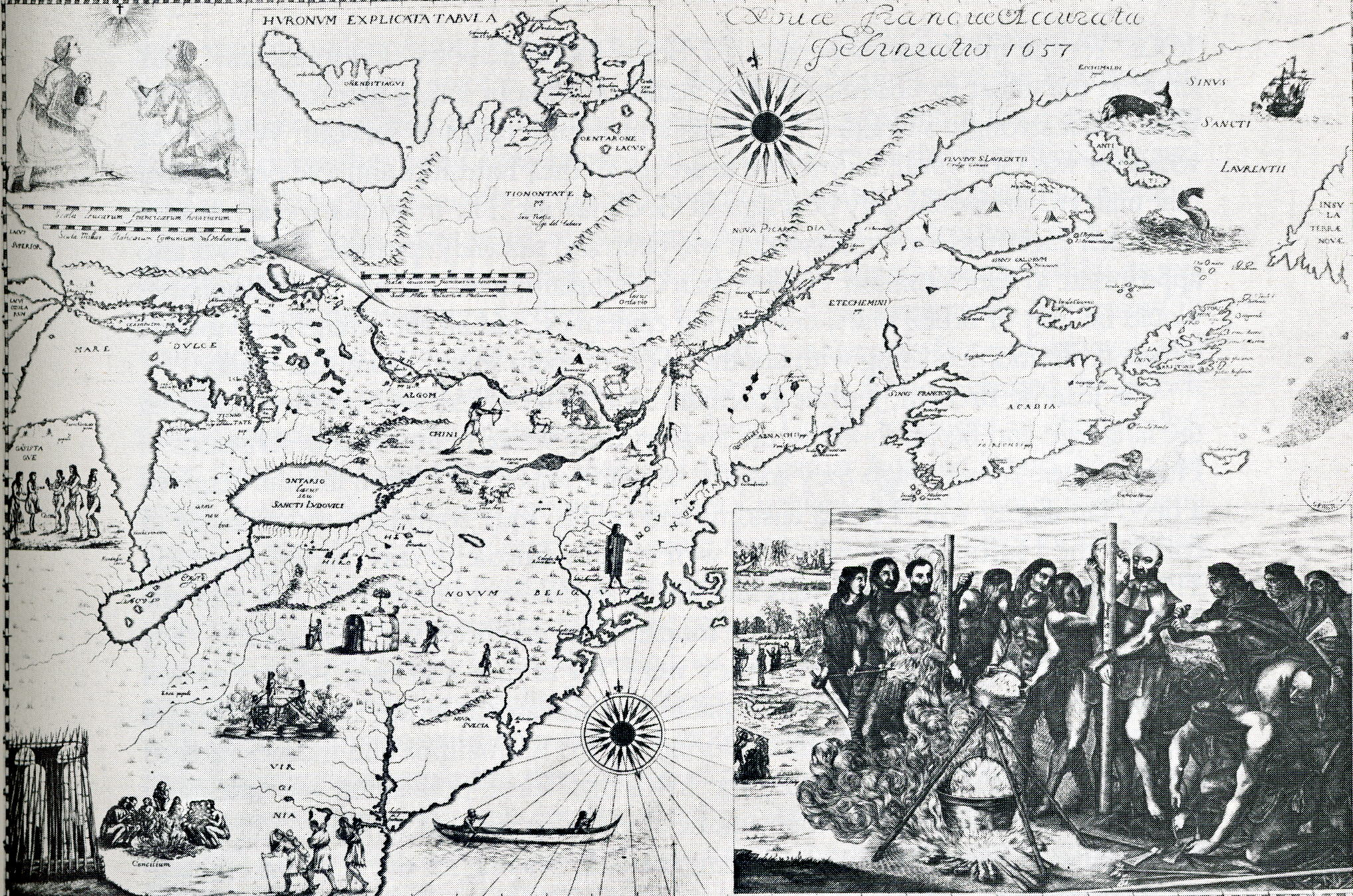
Map of New France with depiction of the martyrdom of Jean de Brébeuf and Gabriel Lalemant.

Considering the glory that redounds to God from the constancy of the martyrs, with whose blood all the rest of the earth has been so lately drenched, it would be a sort of curse if this quarter of the world should not participate in the happiness of having contributed to the splendour of this glory.

Similarly, shortly before his own violent death, the missionary Jean de Brébeuf wrote,

I make a vow to you never to fail, on my side, in the grace of martyrdom, if by your infinite mercy you offer it to me someday, to me, your unworthy servant… my beloved Jesus, I offer to you from to-day… my blood, my body, and my life; so that I might die only for you.

Brébeuf was violently killed at the hands of the Haudenosaunee during a destructive attack on the Christianized Wendat mission settlement of St. Louis in 1649. He would be canonized as a saint in the twentieth century. Thus, the contact between the Wendat and Jesuits enacted major changes in the spiritual, political, cultural, and religious lives of both natives and Europeans in North America.

== Decline of the Wendat ==
In the summer of 1639, a smallpox epidemic struck the natives in the St. Lawrence and Great Lakes regions. The disease reached the Wendat tribes through traders returning from Québec and remained in the region throughout the winter. When the epidemic was over, the Wendat population had been reduced to roughly 9000 people, one half of what it was before 1634.

The Wendat people faced numerous challenges in the 1630s and 1640s. Rampant disease, economic dependency, and Haudenosaunee attacks reduced Wendat population and created rifts in the society. These reasons contributing to the Wendat decline also prompted many of the natives to convert to Catholicism. In the late 1640s, villages that had been left demoralized and leaderless would convert en masse. The Jesuit success was short-lived, however, for the Haudenosaunee would wipe out the Wendat nations in the spring of 1649.

In the 1640s, the Wendat managed to maintain the previous amount of furs they traded to the French, even after having their population cut in half. The required change in organization necessary for the upkeep of such trade practices put a strain on the society. Traders were always travelling between Huronia and the St. Lawrence and many were captured or killed by the Haudenosaunee, especially between 1641 and 1644. Moreover, with so many men absent, Huron settlements were more vulnerable to Haudenosaunee attacks.

=== War with the Haudenosaunee ===
Native warfare became deadlier in the 17th century due to the use of firearms and increasing pressures stemming from epidemics and European trade. However, the ability to kill more efficiently may not have been the foremost reason why the Haudenosaunee wiped out the Wendat. For reasons unclear, the Haudenosaunee shifted their military focus from capturing prisoners to destroying the entire Wendat people. Yet, there was some disagreement within the Haudenosaunee, with one faction wanting to bargain for peace with the French, the other faction wanting war. When the warmongering faction won out, fighting between the Haudenosaunee and its Wendat enemy increased.

Such a change in overall strategy brought about changes to Haudenosaunee tactics: "The traditional siege of a Wendat village aimed at challenging its defenders to come out and fight gave way to surprise attacks at dawn, followed by pillaging, burning, and long trains of captives carrying away booty." Moreover, native attacks in the past had been quick, with the raiding party retreating after it had inflicted the intended damage. In the late 1640s, however, Haudenosaunee tactics changed, as they relentlessly hunted down those who had fled during and after battles.

In 1645, the Wendat mission town of St Joseph was attacked. But for the following two years, violence between the Wendat and Haudenosaunee was minimal, for there was a peace agreement between the Haudenosaunee and the French and their native allies. The unstable peace came to an end in the summer of 1647 when a diplomatic mission headed by Jesuit Father Isaac Jogues and Jean de Lalande to Mohawk territory (one of the five Haudenosaunee nations) was accused of treachery and evil magic. Jogues and La Lande were stripped and beaten when they arrived and were killed the next day. Some of the Wendat who had accompanied Jogues were able to return to Trois-Rivières and informed the French of what had occurred.

Between 1648-1649, Wendat settlements with a Jesuit presence, such as the towns of St. Joseph under Father Antoine Daniel, the villages of St. Ignace and St. Louis, as well as the French fort of Ste. Marie, were subject to repeated attacks by the Haudenosaunee. The Haudenosaunee killed indiscriminately, laying a final blow on the already fragile Wendat population. Those who were not killed dispersed: women and children were often adopted into new societies and cultures, for example. By the end of 1649, however, the Wendat as a recognizable people, with political, cultural, religious, or even a geographical identity ceased to exist. Jesuits were among those captured, tortured, and killed in these attacks; from the missionary perspective, individuals such as Jean de Brébeuf died as martyrs.

== Aftermath ==
"Weakened, divided, and demoralized, the Wendat nations collapsed as a result of the Haudenosaunee hammer blows of 1649." While the Haudenosaunee had failed to take the French fort, Ste. Marie, they had overall been victorious. Factionalized politically, socially, culturally, and religiously, the Wendat took a final blow to their cohesiveness through these violent attacks. Terrified at the prospect of further attacks, the survivors began to flee. By the end of March, fifteen Wendat towns had been abandoned. Many Wendat were absorbed by the Haudenosaunee, while others were incorporated into neighboring tribes. One party of Wendat people had escaped to Île St. Joseph but with their food supplies destroyed, they soon faced starvation; those who left the island in search of game, risked encountering Haudenosaunee raiders who hunted down the hunters "with a ferocity that stunned Jesuit observers." A small group of Catholic Wendat followed the Jesuits back to Québec City, where they became the modern Wendat Nation.

== See also ==
- List of Jesuit sites
