= Carhagouha =

Coordinates: 44.766755°N 80.088272°W

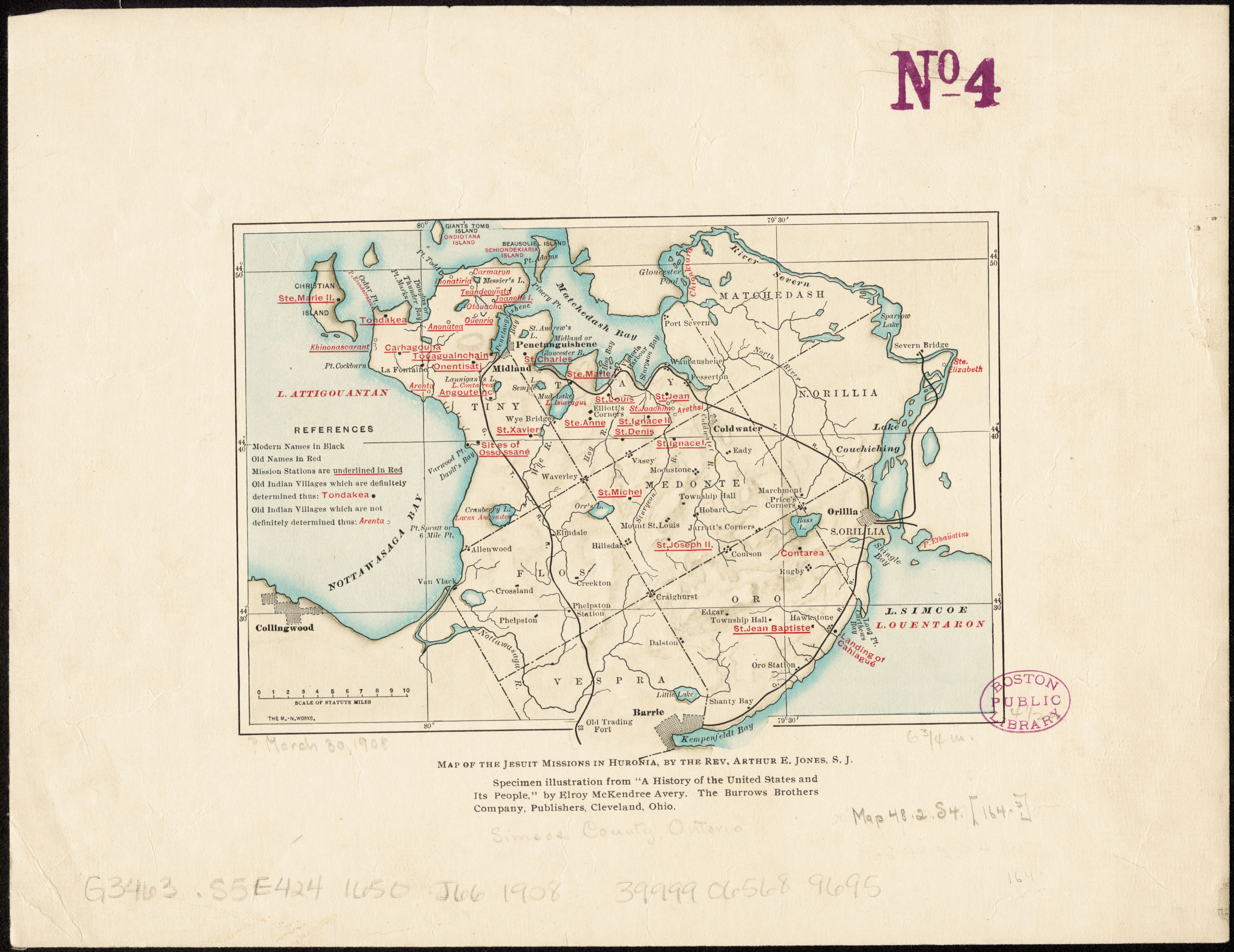
An early 20th century map showing the locations of Jesuit missions in Huronia. The believed location of Carhagouha is shown near the top left.

Carhagouha was a settlement of the Huron/Wendat people. The place where it is thought to have existed, near present-day Lafontaine, Ontario, Canada, is commemorated with a historical marker. Carhagouha was the site of the first Catholic Mass celebrated in what is now Ontario, on August 12 (or June 24), 1615, by Fr. Joseph Le Caron (member of the Recollets order) in the presence of French explorer, Samuel de Champlain, and the Wendat.

Each year a Mass is celebrated to mark the anniversary. The exact place is not precisely known.

It was also the name of the village that Father Joseph Le Caron was staying in when Samuel de Champlain arrived in Huronia in 1615 to assist them in their war against the Iroquois.

== Gallery ==
Unveiling of the statue to Father Le Caron, in Carhagouha, 1921 or 1925.

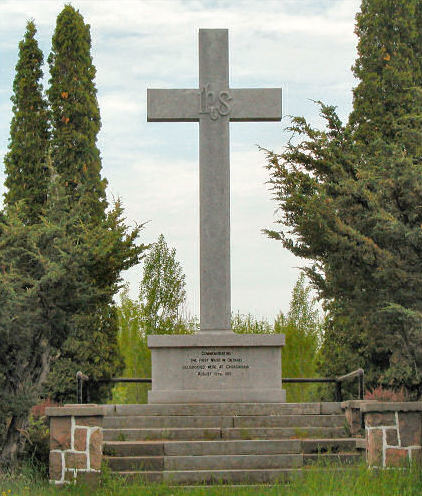
The same statue in 2007

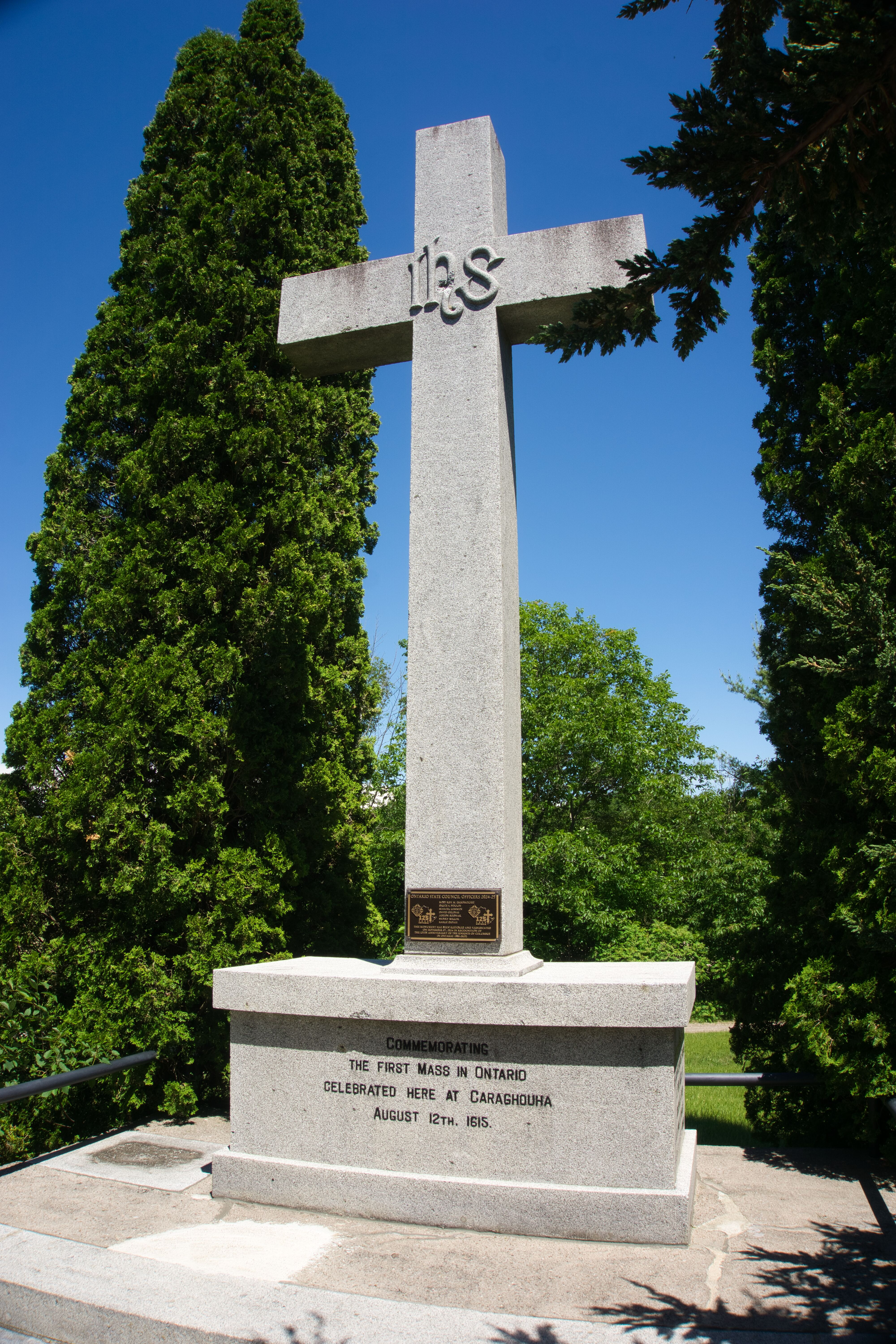
The statue as seen in 2026

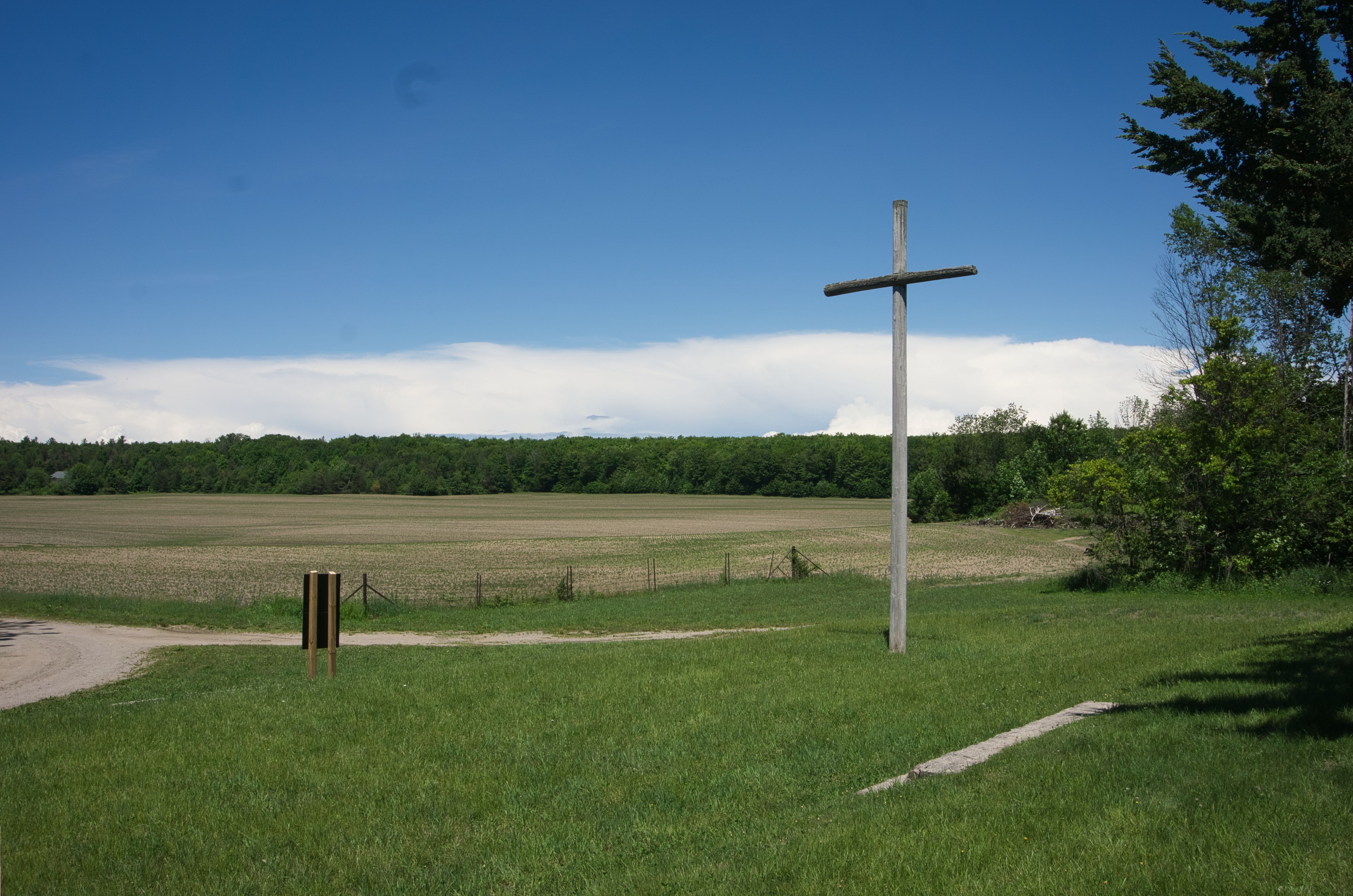
Wooden cross at the site

== See also ==
- Jesuit Missions amongst the Huron
- Wyandot people
- Sainte-Marie among the Hurons
