= Huronia (region) =

Historical region between the Great Lakes of North America

Coordinates: 44.686962°N 79.931059°W

Wendake Huronia
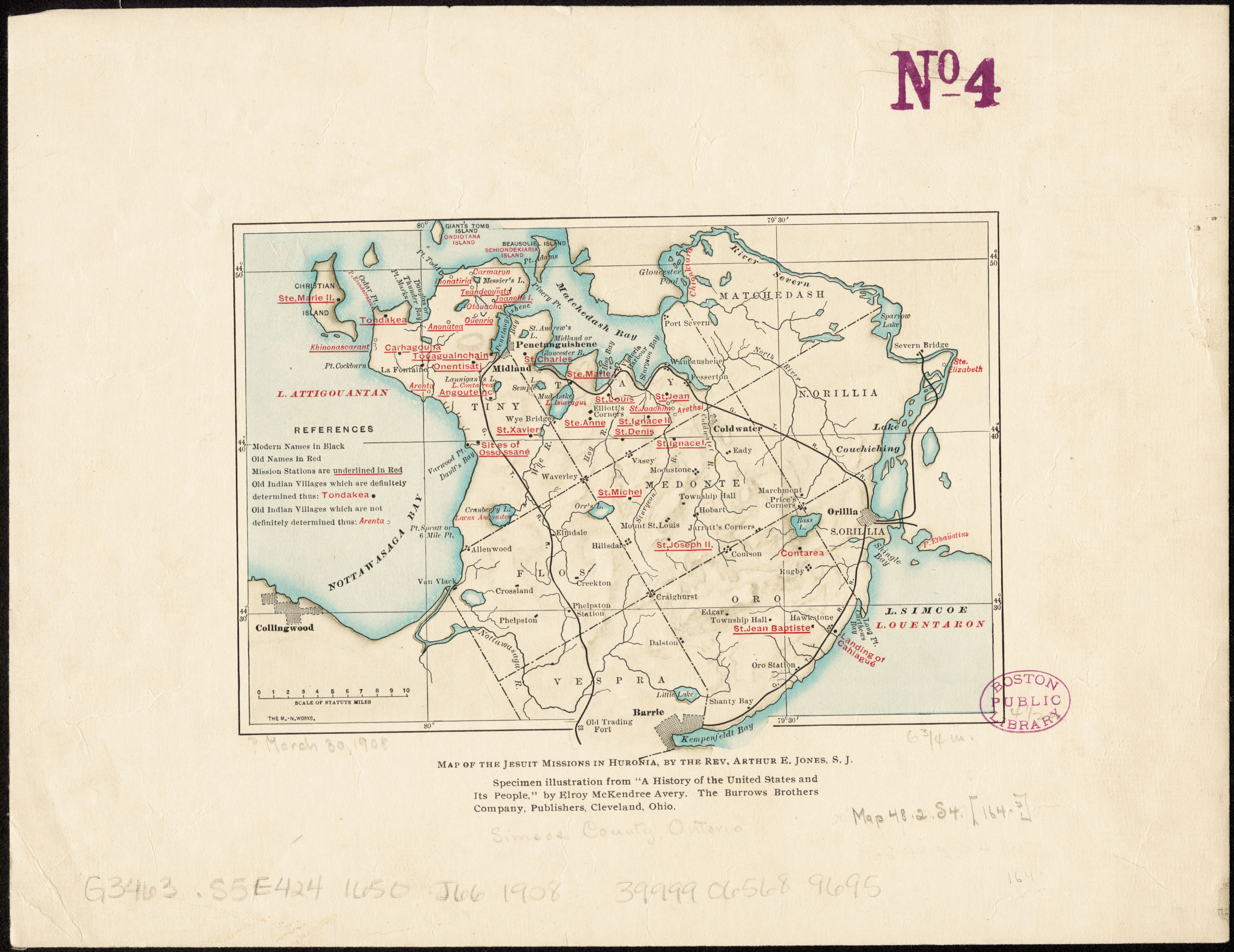
- An early 20th century map showing the locations of settlements in Huronia, overlaid on a contemporary map of Ontario with towns and township boundaries.
- Capital: Ossossané
- Common languages: Wendat language
- Government: Tribal confederation
- Today part of: Canada

Huronia (Wendat: Wendake) is a historical region in the province of Ontario, Canada. It is positioned between lakes Simcoe, Ontario, and Huron. Similarly to the latter, it takes its name from the Wendat or Huron, an Iroquoian-speaking people, whose country it was from prehistoric times until 1649 during the Beaver Wars when they were defeated and displaced by the Haudenosaunee who lived in New York. After their displacement, the Huron-Wendat relocated to Oklahoma (Wyandotte) and Québec, the latter of whom made peace with the British in 1760 and settled their modern country of Nionwentsïo, the capital of which is Wendake.

== Geography ==
The geographic scope of Huronia has been fluid over time. One of the earliest European written conceptions of Huronia, by the Jesuit Jérôme Lalemant in 1639, included the land of the Petun (a related people whose territory is sometimes retrospectively called the Petun Country), which lay to the west of the core Wendat territory. This core Wendat territory was termed "Huronia Proper" by the late 19th- and early 20th-century historian Arthur E. Jones.

At the time of first European contact, Wendake was "one of the most densely populated territories north of Mexico." It consisted of twenty to twenty-five settlements occupying about 2,100 square kilometres (810 sq mi) between Nottawasaga Bay and Lake Simcoe west to east, and Matchedash Bay and the Severn River and the swampy basin of the Nottawasaga River, north to south. Wendat settlements and population were concentrated on the Penetanguishene peninsula, near the present day town of Midland, Ontario, in the northernmost part of Wendake. The total population of the Wendat at the time of first contact with the French is usually estimated to have been about 30,000. Cahiague, the largest settlement, may have had a population of 4,000.

== Subsistence ==
The Wendat were farmers, primarily of maize, which comprised 60 percent or more of their diet. They also cultivated beans, squash, sunflowers, and tobacco. Huronia was among the most northern places in the Americas where maize could be grown. The northern border of Huronia abutted on the Canadian Shield, a rocky region of thin soils and cold climate in which agriculture was difficult or impossible. The Wendat cleared forest from much of the land in Huronia and produced an agricultural surplus which they traded to their non-farming Algonquin neighbors. The soil of Huronia was sandy and low in productivity. The Wendat practiced slash-and-burn agriculture, clearing a field of forest and farming it for 10 to 15 years until soil fertility declined and then moving both their farming and their village to another location a few miles away. Scholars have estimated that yields of maize were from 8 bushels (200 kg) to 22 bushels (560 kg) per acre with the higher estimate for land newly cultivated and the lower estimate for land that had deteriorated in fertility after being planted for many years. To feed their people, the Wendat required from .4 acres (0.16 ha) to .8 acres (0.32 ha) of land under cultivation per capita with more land required to attain a surplus for trading. French visitors commented on the extensive fields of maize near Wendat villages.

Meat was a minor item in the Wendat diet. Fish, procured from Lake Huron and smaller lakes, was an important food. The women collected wild berries and nuts. Acorns were a food in times of famine. Maple syrup as a late-winter food was known to many Wendat neighbors and they too may have collected and concentrated the sap of the maple tree.

== Prehistory ==
Archaeological investigations have indicated that the ancestral home of the people known to the French as the Huron and to themselves as the Wendat was near the northern shore of Lake Ontario. Some Wendat began migrating 100 km (62 mi) or further northward to the historic Huronia area as early as the 13th century. The abandonment of the Lake Ontario area and the consolidation of the four peoples making up the Wendat confederation in Huronia was complete about 1600. Joining the Wendat were at least 1,000 of the St. Lawrence Iroquoians who had disappeared from their homeland by 1583.

The reason for the movement of the Wendat north from Lake Ontario to the Huronia area was possibly to move further away from the hostile Haudenosaunee of New York. They may also have wished to take advantage of a riverine trade route, safer from Haudenosaunee attacks, via Lake Nipissing to reach Europeans who were trading along the St. Lawrence River from the 1580s onward. The move northward gained them easier access to the Algonquin peoples and trade with the Algonquins for beaver pelts and other furs, the most valuable products sought by early European traders in Canada.

== History ==
The term Huronia, which was coined by later Europeans, is distinct from the term the Wendat themselves used for their dwelling place, which is wendake ("the peninsula country").

Recurrent and catastrophic epidemics of European diseases from 1634 to 1640 reduced the Wendat population to about 12,000. The Jesuit Relations record that in 1639, the Wenro relocated from their homeland to Huronia, with over 600 Wenro arriving at Ossossané. This migration may have occurred in waves and some Wenro were resident in Neutral (rather than Wendat) territory as late as 1640–41. The time period of the recorded Wenro migration is similar to that of the appearance of pottery frilling motifs at sites in western Huronia; this has been commonly identified as the "Genoa Frilled" type associated with the Genoa Fort type site in modern-day western New York. The theory among scholars that the appearance of frilling motifs in western Huronia corresponds to the Wenro migration and potential spread of Wenro material culture to Huronia dates back to as early as 1973; however, chemical analysis results published in 2001 showed that frilled pottery in western Huronia was likely not made in New York, and analysis of similarities in the style of frilling was inconclusive.

In 1649, the Haudenosaunee successfully attacked Huronia. The Wendake who survived the Haudenosaunee attack fled the region. Huronia was left depopulated and controlled by the Haudenosaunee.

Following the dispersal of the Wendat during and after the Beaver Wars, wendake came to mean new lands as far away as Quebec and Ohio where their Wyandot descendants resettled. Early European maps and accounts do not use the term Huronia; rather, Jesuit missionaries used terms such as Pays de Huron, or, later, Huronum. In his 1745 Huron–French dictionary, the Jesuit Father Pierre Potier defined the Wendat term wendake ehen as "La Defunte huronie", referring to the pre-dispersal homeland.

In the 20th century, the territory lent its name to the Huronia movement, a northern-oriented political movement in Ontario which pursued regional autonomy.

== Historical places and settlements ==
Some documented historical places and settlements in Huronia were:

- Carhagouha
- Gahoendoe (Christian Island)
- Ossossané
- Sainte-Marie among the Hurons (Jesuit mission village, destroyed in 1649)

== See also ==
- Apacheria
- Comancheria
- Huronia (cephalopod)
- Lenapehoking
- Wendake
- History of Ontario
