= Huronia =

Huronia may refer to:

- Huronia (region), the historical homeland of the Huron/Wendat/Wyandot nation in Ontario
- Huronia (cephalopod), a genus of mollusks
