= Ratcliff Site =

Archaeological site in Ontario, Canada

- Location within Ontario today
- 43°59′48″N 79°17′6″W
- Periods: Late Precontact Period, ca. 1550–1615
- Cultures: Wendat (Huron)
- Location: Whitchurch–Stouffville, Regional Municipality of York, Ontario, Canada
- Region: Regional Municipality of York, Ontario

The Ratcliff or Baker Hill Site is a 16th-century Wendat (Huron) ancestral village located on one of the headwater tributaries of the Rouge River on the south side of the Oak Ridges Moraine in present-day Whitchurch–Stouffville, approximately 25 kilometers north of Toronto. The Ratcliff Site is located on the east side of Highway 48, south of Bloomington Road in Whitchurch–Stouffville. The ravine on the village site was infilled during the early 1950s to allow for the expansion of a neighboring quarry.

Ancestral Huron Feast of the Dead in which remains were reburied in an ossuary, J.-F. Lafitau, 1724

The village occupied approximately 2.8 hectares on the brow of a hill overlooking a steep ravine on the west side.

The artifacts found on the site in the mid-19th century included stone-axes, flint arrows and spear heads, broken crockery, many earthen and stone pipes, bears' teeth with holes bored through them, polished teeth of beaver, deer and moose for decorative use; bone needles, and fish-spears made of deer shoulder-blades, as well as millstones used by the women for crushing corn. A human skull was found "perforated with seven holes, and had evidently been held as a trophy, the holes being the score of enemies slaughtered in battle by the wearer."

The ceramics found on the site indicate that the local community must have had some contact with other Iroquoian groups living in present-day upstate New York and in the St. Lawrence Valley. The large quantity of both ground and chipped stone indicates that the Wendat Village was involved with the production and distribution of stone artifacts. The presence of some contact-period (European) artifacts, such as black glass and copper beads, suggest that the site was inhabited between the late 16th and early 17th centuries.

About 400 meters north of the Ratcliff Site on lot 10 in concession 8, a mass grave with "many hundreds" of Wendat skeletons was discovered and removed in the late 1840s. In ancient Wendat tradition, the dead would be initially buried in a temporary grave. Every ten years the accumulated bones would be moved to a mass grave in an elaborate ceremony.

The inhabitants likely came here from the so-called Mantle Site, located five kilometers to the south-east in Stouffville, when the latter was abandoned in the early 17th century. The Ratcliff Site was occupied at the same time as the so-called Aurora Site, four kilometres north-west of Ratcliff, also within the boundaries of what is today Whitchurch–Stouffville.

Today the site is still occupied by a quarry. Farms surround the site itself.
