= Draper Site =

- Location within Ontario today
- 43°55′42″N 79°10′32″W
- Periods: Late Precontact Period, ca. 1475-1525
- Cultures: Wendat (Huron)
- Location: Pickering, Ontario, Regional Municipality of Durham, Ontario, Canada
- Region: Regional Municipality of Durham, Ontario

The Draper Site is a precontact period (late fifteenth-century) Wendat-ancestral village located on a tributary of West Duffins Creek in present-day Pickering, Ontario, approximately 35 kilometres northeast of Toronto. The site is found in a wooded area on existing farmland and may be reached by walking from the end of North Road.

The Huron community on the Draper Site expanded at least five times over some thirty years beginning around 1525. At its largest, it had a total of 35 longhouses that held up to 2000 people. They were located on four hectares of land, and the settlement was fortified with multiple rows of wooden palisades. The expansion of this village coincided with the abandonment of smaller villages in the area.

In the late sixteenth century, after more than a generation on the Draper Site, the entire community moved five kilometres northwest to establish a new settlement, which archeologists have named the Mantle Site. The latter is located in the southeast corner of present-day Stouffville. It is the largest Wendat ancestral village excavated to date.

The same community was formerly thought to have left the Mantle Site circa 1550 to establish the so-called Ratcliff Site and the Aurora Site, to the north-west in what is today the Town of Whitchurch-Stouffville. New analysis in 2018 established that the Mantle Site was active from 1587 to 1623.

In early 1975 and 1978, the largely undisturbed Draper Site was completely excavated. This archeological work was to explore and salvage artifacts and evidence in preparation for the destruction of the site during the construction of the Pickering Airport.
