= Mantle Site =

Remains of an indigenous village

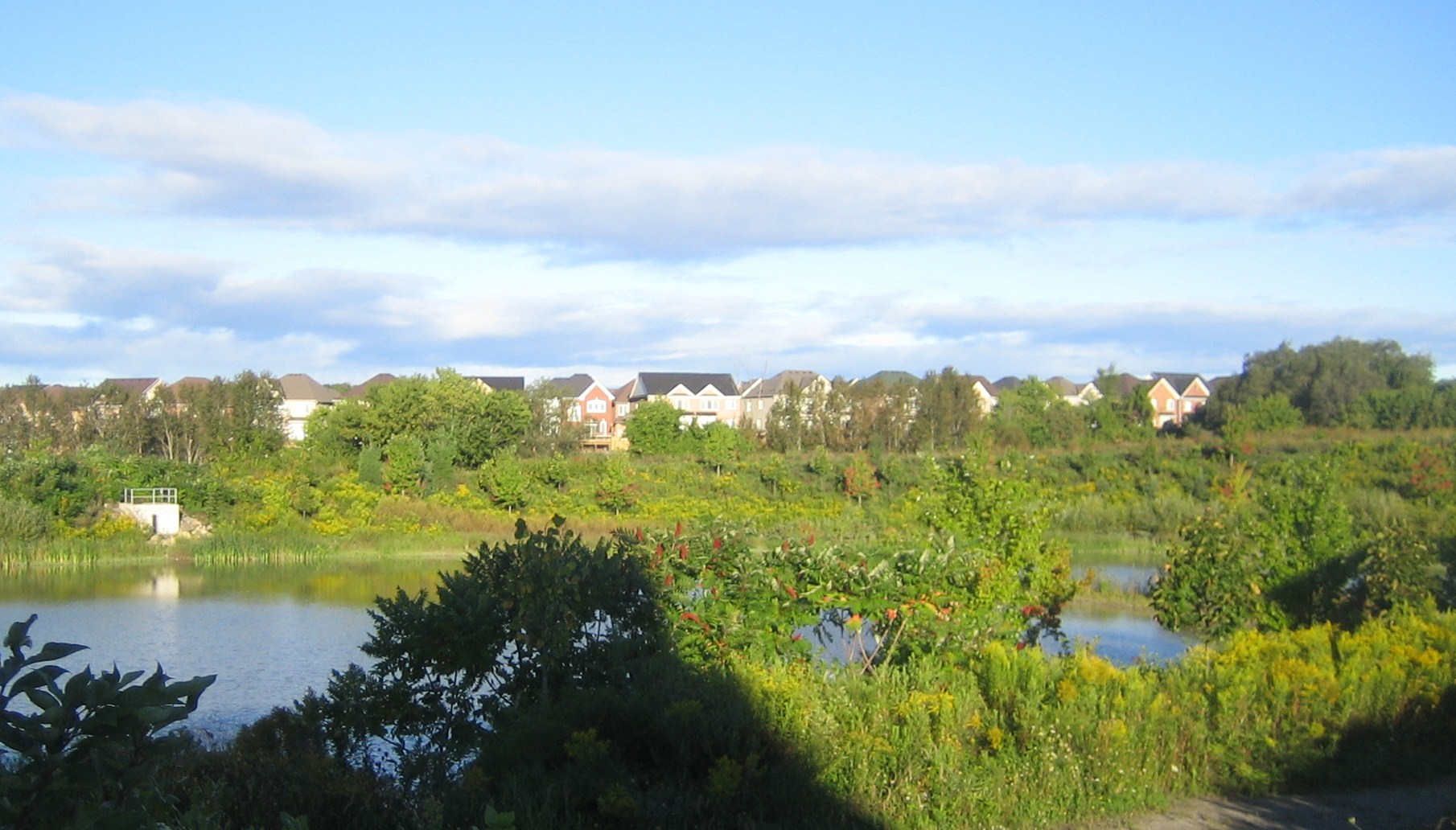
- View of the site looking west from Byers Pond Way.

- Location within Regional Municipality of York Location within Southern Ontario
- 43°57′49″N 79°14′13″W
- Periods: Late Precontact Period, ca. 1500–1530
- Cultures: Wendat (Huron)
- Location: Whitchurch–Stouffville, Regional Municipality of York, Ontario, Canada
- Region: Regional Municipality of York, Ontario

Site notes
- Excavation dates: 2003-2005

The "Jean-Baptiste Lainé" or Mantle Site in the town of Whitchurch–Stouffville, north-east of Toronto, Ontario, Canada, is the largest and most complex ancestral Wendat (Huron) village to be excavated to date in the Lower Great Lakes region. The site's southeastern access point is at the intersection of Mantle Avenue and Byers Pond Way.

Formerly thought to have been active 1500-1530, the prime period of the site has been shifted to 1587-1623, based on radiocarbon dating and Bayesian analysis. This has influenced new interpretations of migrations and population movement in the region among the Iroquoian peoples prior to the coalescence of the Wendat.

== The site ==
In 2002, remains of a Wendat village from the late Precontact Period (i.e., immediately prior to the arrival of Europeans) was discovered during the construction of the new subdivision in Whitchurch–Stouffville along Stouffville Creek, a tributary of West Duffins Creek, on a section of Lot 33, Concession 9.

From circa 1587-1623, an estimated 1500 to 2000 people inhabited the 4.2-hectare (10-acre) site. The community likely consisted of persons who came from multiple smaller sites, including the Draper Site, located five kilometres south-east of Mantle in north Pickering.

In 2012, archaeologists revealed that they had discovered a forged wrought iron axehead of European origin, which had been carefully buried in a longhouse at the centre of the village site. It is believed that the axe originated from a Basque whaling station in the Strait of Belle Isle (Newfoundland and Labrador), and was traded into the interior of the continent a century before Europeans began to explore the Great Lakes region. "It is the earliest European piece of iron ever found in the North American interior."

The Mantle Site was enclosed by a three-row wooden fort-like structure (palisade) surrounding 95 longhouses, of which at least 50 were occupied at any one time. Each longhouse was approximately 20 feet (6.1 m) wide, 20 feet (6.1 m) high; lengths varied from 40 feet (12 m) to 160 feet (49 m), with a typical length of 100 feet (30 m). They were constructed from maple or cedar saplings and covered by elm or cedar bark. The layout displays a uniquely high degree of organization (when compared, e.g., to the Draper Site), and includes an open plaza and a developed waste management system.

The community would have required more than sixty thousand even-aged saplings to construct houses and palisade walls and the agricultural field system would have been hundreds, if not thousands of hectares in extent. ... it would appear that refuse was directed out of the interior of the village into a borrow trench situated on the outside of the palisade—thereby representing one of the first organic and inorganic waste stream management systems known in the northeast.

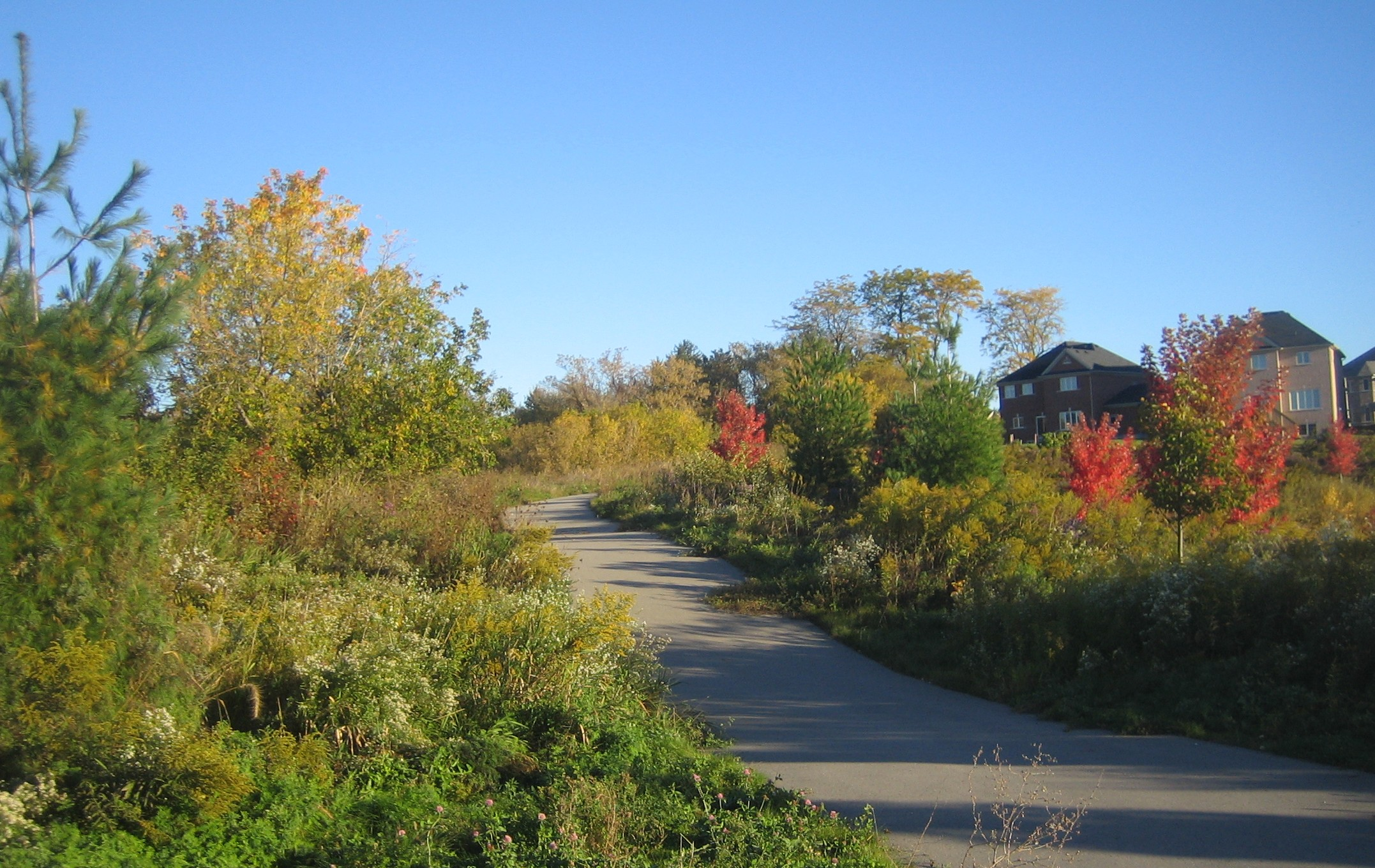
Mantle Huron Village Site, Stouffville, looking north to Lost Pond Crescent

Maize comprised 62% of the community's diet, which translates to approximately one pound of maize per person per day, or (minimally) 1,500 pounds for the community per day. More maize may have been required for trade with the Algonquin people to the north. The community farmed 8 km^{2} (2,000 acres) of land, stretching up to 5 km (3.1 miles) in every direction from the village site. For clothing, up to 6,800 deer skins per year were needed, which would have required hunting in a least 40 km (25 miles) in every direction from the site.

A series of modeled human and animal effigy ceramic vessels were found on the site. These are similar to ones found at on contemporaneous Oneida villages in New York State, indicating the cosmopolitan nature of the community that settled the Mantle Site. The humanlike effigies are thought to be mythical cornhusk people associated with horticultural crops.

Unlike other indigenous villages in the Great Lakes region, the Mantle Site is unique "in that it represents a community that had already come together from several villages and chose to build here." During its existence, the community was the only village near the eastern Rouge trail linking Lake Ontario and Lake Simcoe and north of it. Artifacts found indicate trade and interaction with distant First Nations groups to the north, east, south and west.

After two or three decades on the Mantle Site, the people abandoned the location in the first half of the seventeenth century. They likely moved five kilometres north-west to the so-called Ratcliff Site and / or the Aurora Site. In the seventeenth century, the community likely joined others to form one of the Huron tribes in the Orillia-Georgian Bay area.

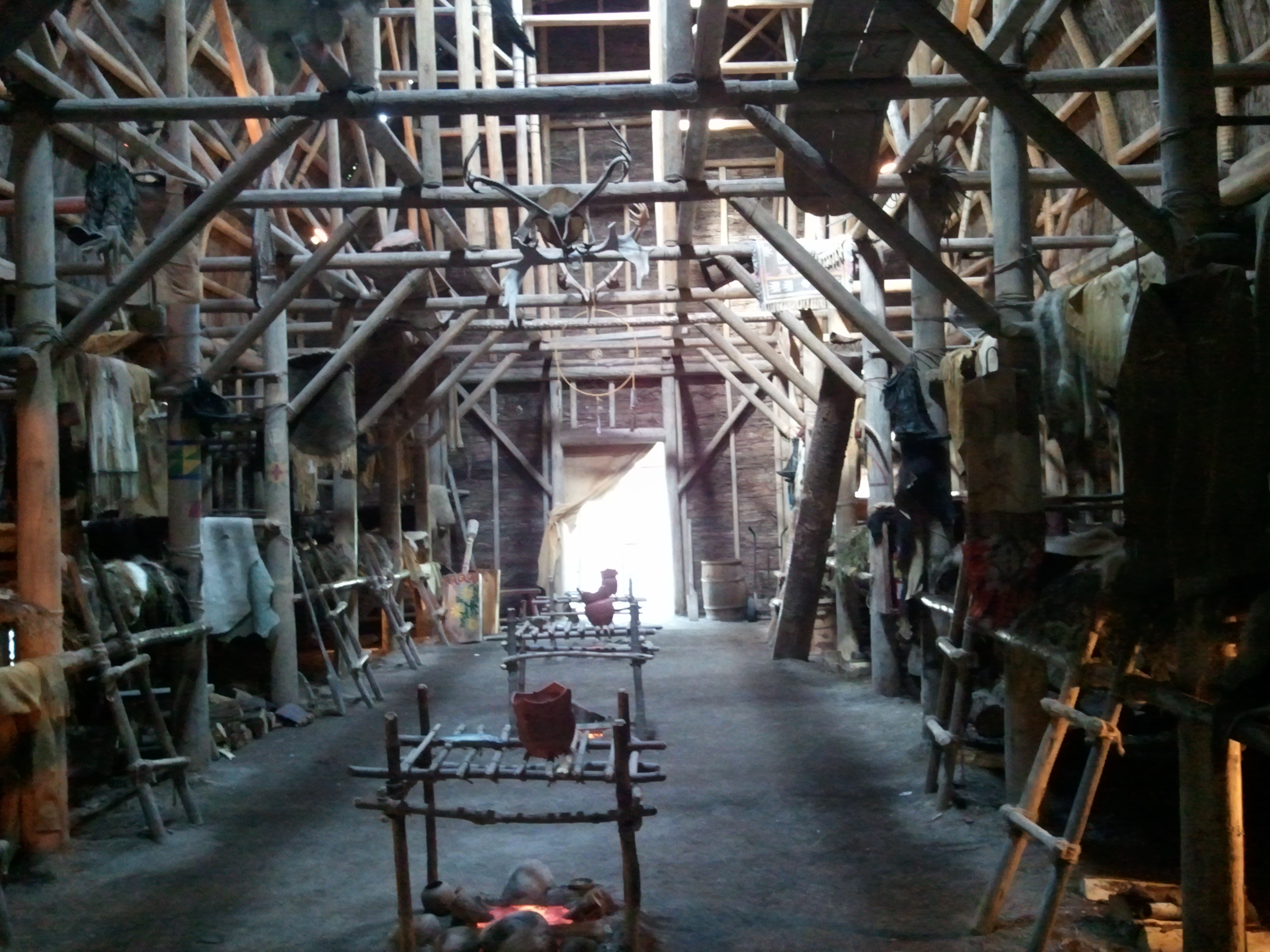
Interior of reconstructed Wendat long house, Huron-Wendat Museum in Wendake, Quebec

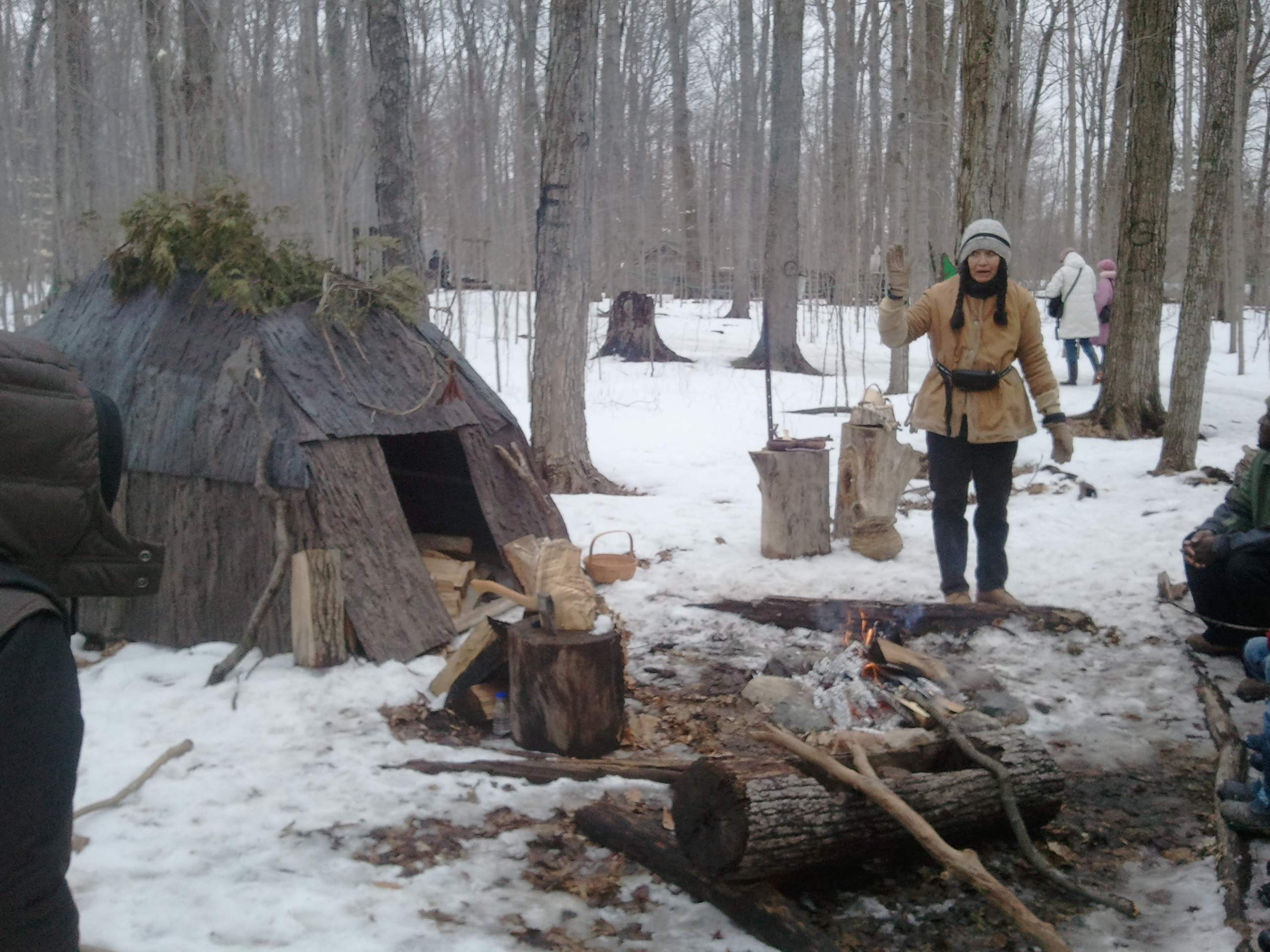
Huron maple syrup demonstration, Bruce's Mill Conservation Area, Stouffville, Ontario

== Excavation and evaluation of site and artifacts ==
With the discovery of the Mantle Site by Lebovic Enterprises, Archaeological Services Inc. was contracted to complete an evaluation of the site's significance. A decision was made to preserve about 5% of the original Mantle Site, primarily along the bank of the creek. The site was documented and over 150,000 artifacts were removed for study and interpretation at McMaster University and the University of Toronto. Because of their national significance, the artifacts will be safeguarded by the Canadian Museum of Civilization. The archaeological site-work took three years to complete (2003–2005).

== Succeeding development ==
Most of the site is now used as a storm water pond; the homes on the south-west corner of Lost Pond Crescent also occupy part of the village site. A small cemetery found outside the village walls has been preserved and protected in accordance with the provincial cemeteries act and in consultation with First Nations.

The consequent development of the west side of the creek in the Fieldgate River Ridge subdivision around James Ratcliff Avenue was delayed significantly. The expected village ossuary, a mass grave with an expected 300 to 400 skeletal remains, has not been yet been located. The Town of Whitchurch–Stouffville is planning further housing development immediately south of the Mantle Site in the town's Phase Two development plan.

In 2004, First Nations peoples visited the site and performed ceremonies. The Mantle Site (among others) is mentioned in the 2007 provincial inquiry into the Ipperwash Crisis; the report highlights the importance of ancestral burial sites to First Nations people, explains why they often become flashpoints for occupation (a need to protect them from further desecration), and recommends consultation with First Nations regarding the disposition of a site.

== Recognition and legacy ==
Consequently in 2007, the Town Council of Whitchurch–Stouffville recognized the Mantle Site as "one of the most significant Huron ancestral villages in Southern Ontario," and committed itself to work with the Wendat to "assign aboriginal names to watercourses, streets and trails in and around the Mantle Site and elsewhere in the municipality."

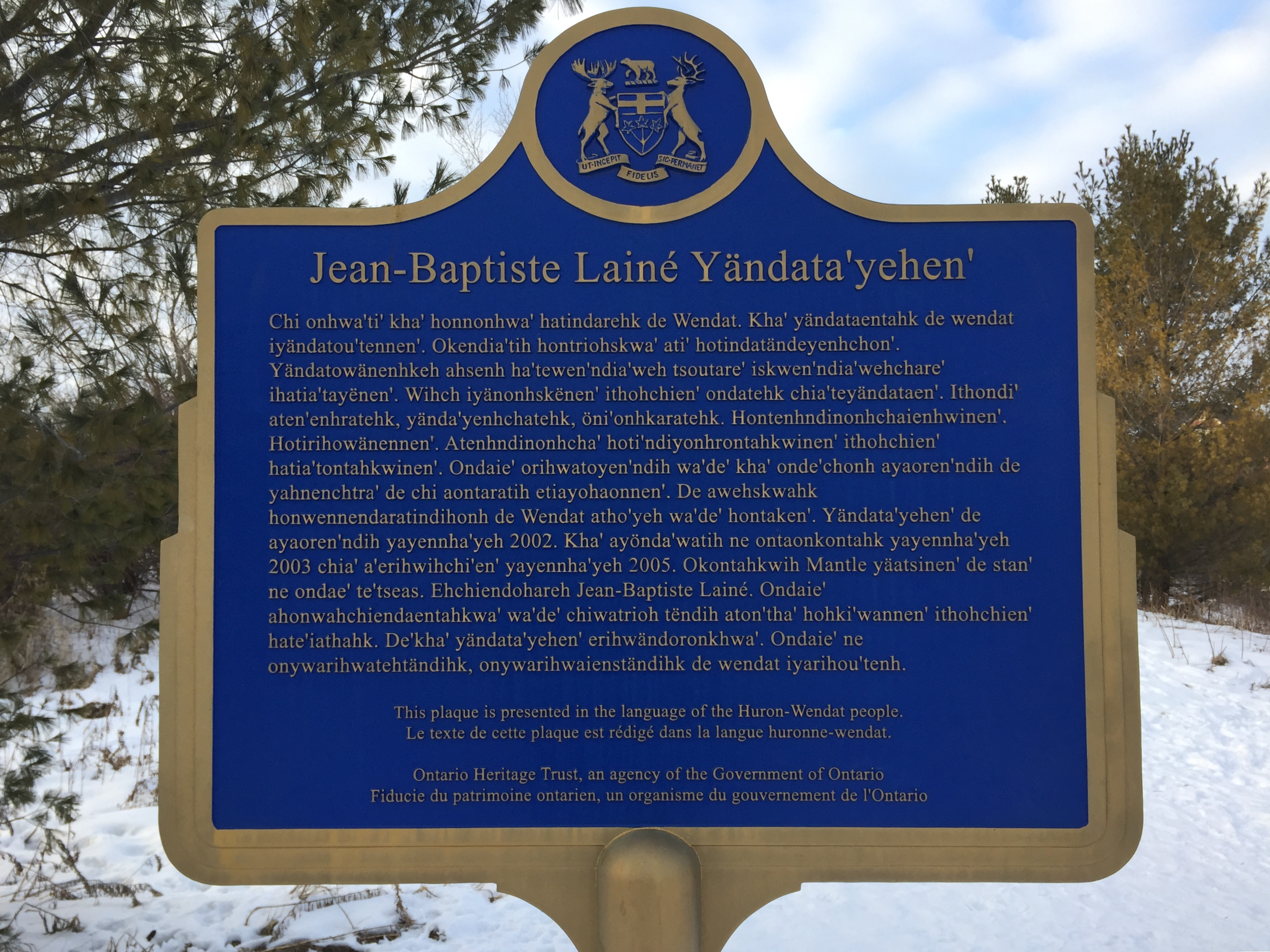
Ontario Heritage Trust plaque in the language of the Wendat people.

In 2011, the York Region District School Board announced that it would name the new school to be built adjacent to the site the "Wendat Village Public School."

In Summer 2011, Wendat ceremonies were held at the site, and it was renamed the "Jean-Baptiste Lainé" Site in honour of a decorated Second World War Huron-Wendat veteran.

In 2017 Ontario Heritage Trust installed historic provincial plaques about the Jean-Baptiste Lainé Site near the Wendat Village Public School, recounting the history and significance of the site, the evidence of the wide trading network, and the relation of this 16th-century ancestral community to the rise of the Huron-Wendat people. The plaque is in English, French, and Wendat, an Iroquoian language.

== Dating ==
Radiocarbon dating of charcoal and short-lived botanical material late in the second decade of the twenty-first century and Bayesian analysis has resulted in a re-dating of the Mantle Site to a fairly precise time period: 1587-1623CE (with 95.4% probability). This analysis has also resulted in the redating of the related Draper and Spang sites, with conclusions about the speed of change among the region's indigenous peoples in this period.

== Wendat people today ==
The Wendat (Huron) are one of the peoples of the larger Iroquoian cultural and language family. The Wendat Nation is a First Nation whose community is located at Wendake, Quebec. The Wendat, and other local First Nation peoples, have urged towns and developers in York Region to preserve indigenous sites so that they may "worship at the places where [their] ancestors are buried." The discovery of a sixteenth-century European axe at Mantle is also of political importance for the Wendat First Nation, for its current negotiations with federal and provincial governments.

== Film and television ==
In 2012, a two-hour documentary film on the Mantle Wendat-Huron Village Site, Curse of the Axe, was produced by yap films in association with Shaw Media, and narrated by Robbie Robertson.

== See also ==
- List of archaeological sites in Whitchurch–Stouffville
- History of Toronto
