= Aurora Site =

Archaeological site in Ontario, Canada

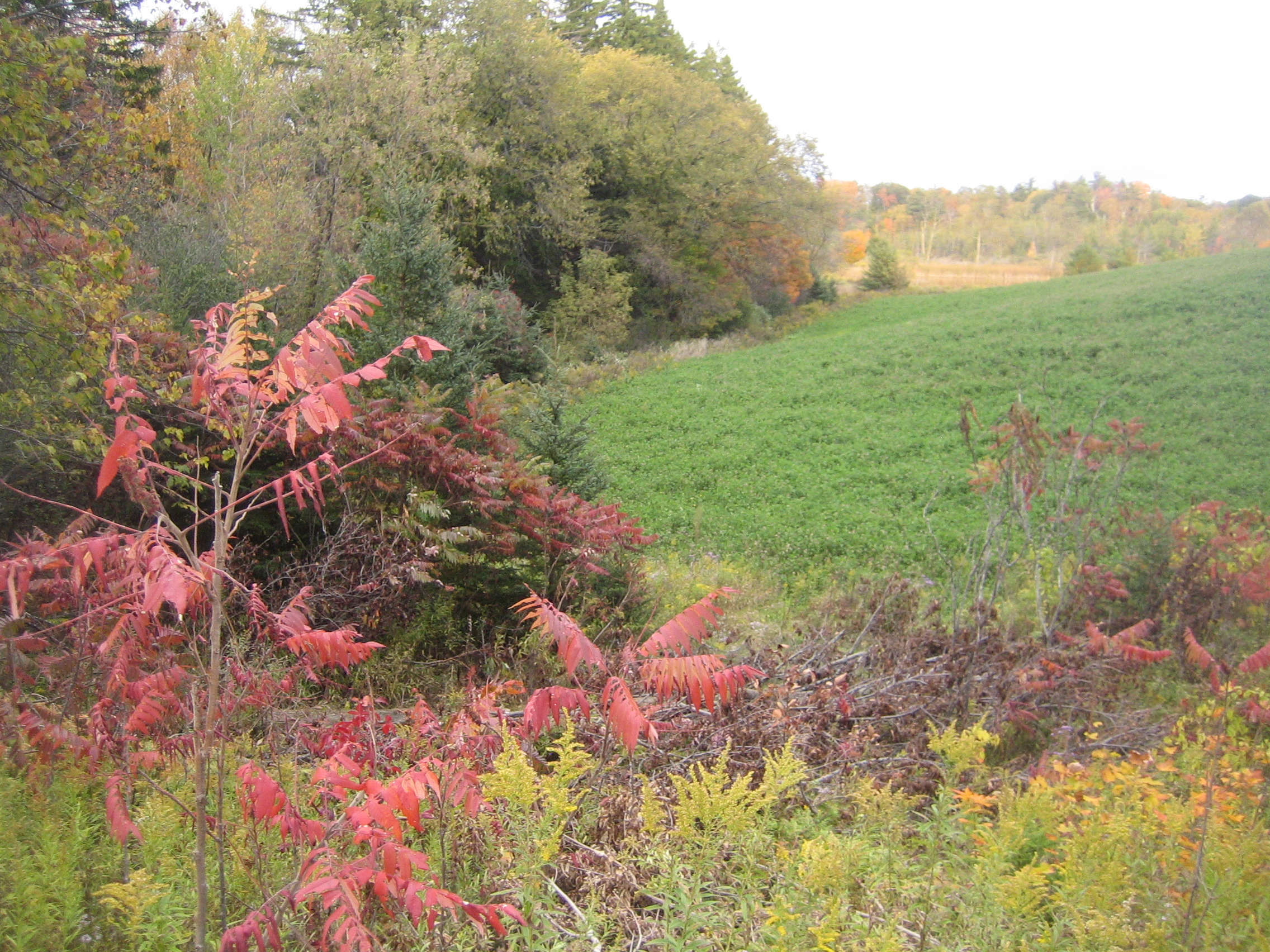
- Aurora/Old Fort Site (16th century Wendat ancestral village), Kennedy Road, south of Vandorf Side Road, Whitchurch–Stouffville, ON, looking east.

- Location within Ontario today
- 44°0′28″N 79°20′16″W
- Periods: Late Pre-Contact period, c. 1550–1575
- Cultures: Wendat people
- Location: Whitchurch–Stouffville, Regional Municipality of York, Ontario, Canada
- Region: Regional Municipality of York, Ontario

History
- Abandoned: Before 1800s

Site notes
- Excavation dates: 1846/1888/1901; 1947, 1957
- Archaeologists: William Brodie, John Norman Emerson

The Aurora Site, also known as the "Old Fort", "Old Indian Fort", "Murphy Farm" or "Hill Fort" site, is a sixteenth-century Wendat ancestral village located on one of the headwater tributaries of the East Holland River on the north side of the Oak Ridges Moraine in present-day Whitchurch–Stouffville, approximately 30 kilometres north of Toronto. This Wendat ancestral village was located on 3.4 hectares (8.4 acres) of land and the settlement was fortified with multiple rows of palisades.

The community arrived c. 1625, likely moving en masse from the so-called Mantle Site located nine kilometres to the south-east in what is today urban Stouffville. The Aurora Site is located at the south-east corner of Kennedy Road and Vandorf Side Road, east of the hamlet of Vandorf in the town of Whitchurch–Stouffville. The Aurora Site was occupied at the same time as the nearby Ratcliff Site.

The Rouge River trail, used by the Wendat and then later by the French to travel between Lake Ontario and Lake Simcoe / Georgian Bay, ran through the Aurora Site.

Perhaps the busiest and best documented of these routes was that which followed the Humber River valley northward ... although another trail of equal importance and antiquity and used earlier than the former by the French, extended from the mouth of the Rouge River northward to the headwaters of the Little Rouge and over the drainage divide to the East Branch of the Holland River at Holland Landing.

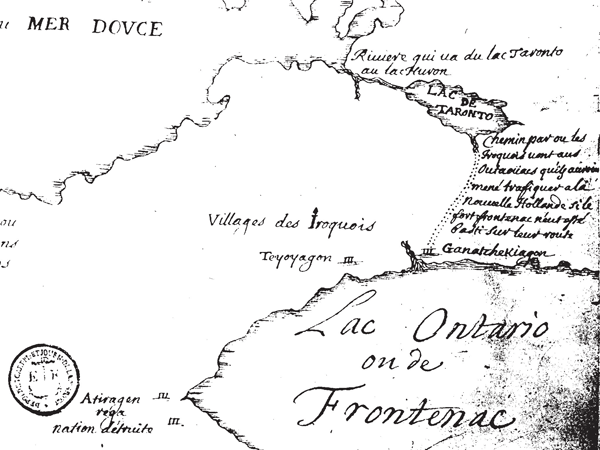
Rouge Trail Map, c. 1673 by Louis Jolliet

The Aurora Site was indiscriminately looted by collectors throughout the eighteenth and early nineteenth centuries. An 1885 report on Whitchurch Township notes that two thousand interments took place on the site, and that another smaller burial site was found two hundred yards from the site beside a large pond.

The self-trained archaeologist William Brodie wrote two archaeological reports on his findings at the Old Fort Site (1888; 1901) dating to his first visit in 1846. In reference to the Old Fort Site, Brodie wrote in 1901:

To say that a ton of archaeological material was collected from the County of York sites, is a moderate estimate. Some of it is in European museums, some in the States, and some of it in Laval University, some of it is still in the hands of amateur collectors, and a little of it has been secured for the Provincial Museum, but the greater part of it, once in the keeping of private collectors, is gone, being collected and lost, as private collections often are.

A complete map of the site was produced in 1930 by the amateur archaeologist Peter Pringle.

The Aurora Site was completely excavated in 1947 and 1957 by the University of Toronto. The 1947 dig was the first student excavation by the university, and it was led by John Norman Emerson. Emerson's doctoral work was largely based on the excavations of the Aurora Site.

This excavation contributed to the conclusions of archeologists and anthropologists that the Wendat coalesced as a people in this area, rather than further east in the St. Lawrence River valley, as was thought at one time. Findings in the late twentieth century at the Ratcliff Site and in 2005 at the Mantle Site have provided more evidence of sixteenth-century settlements by ancestral Wendat in this region. The use of technological and analytic advances, such as radiocarbon dating and Bayesian analysis, has resulted in new conclusions about the occupancy of these varied sites. Some researchers now believe that the Mantle Site was occupied 1587 to 1623; this view is controversial, and other researchers have disputed these findings.
