= The Jesuit Relations =

Chronicles of the Jesuit missions in New France

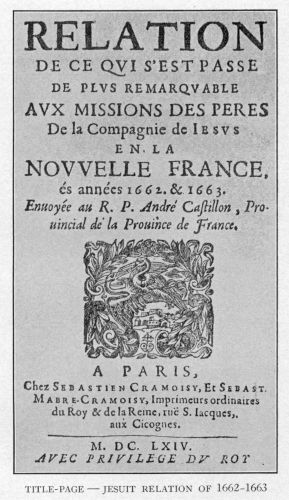
Cover of the Jesuit Relations for 1662–1663

The Jesuit Relations, also known as Relations des Jésuites de la Nouvelle-France (Relation de ce qui s'est passé [...]), are chronicles of the Jesuit missions in New France. The works were written annually and printed beginning in 1632 and ending in 1673.

Originally written in French, Latin, and Italian, The Jesuit Relations were reports from Jesuit missionaries in the field to their superiors to update them on the missionaries' progress in the conversion of various Indigenous North American tribes, including the Huron, Montagnais, Miꞌkmaq, Mohawk, and Algonquins. Constructed as narratives, the original reports of the Jesuit missionaries were subsequently transcribed and altered several times before their publication, first by the Jesuit overseer in New France and then by the Jesuits' governing body in France. The Jesuits began to shape the Relations for the general public to attract new settlers to the colony and to raise enough capital and political support to continue the missions in New France.

The Relations are integral to the historiography of the Jesuits of New France. Recent scholarship illuminates how those documents may have been recirculated to Jesuit colleges in New France, which changes how one can understand their ethnographic and knowledge-producing value.

Despite those reservations, The Jesuit Relations remain a valuable source of information about the Indigenous societies during the French colonization of North America during the 17th century. Overall, these texts serve as microcosms of Indigenous-European relations in North America.

== History ==
Jesuit missionaries had to write annual reports to their superior in Quebec City or Montreal as an account of their activities. Annually, between 1632 and 1673, the superior compiled a narrative, or "Relation," of the most important events that had occurred in the several missionary districts under his charge. He sometimes used the exact words of the missionaries and sometimes summarized the individual journals in a general account, based in part also upon the oral reports of visiting fathers. The annual "Relation" was forwarded to the provincial of the Order in France. After he reviewed and edited it, he published the account in a series of duodecimo volumes, known collectively as The Jesuit Relations. In France, the published texts were also shaped by the editors, who often remained anonymous.

The missionary Charles Lallemont wrote a letter to his brother, dated 1 August 1626, which marks the beginning of the Jesuits accounts and the series Relations des Jésuites de la Nouvelle-France about the missionary work in New France. It is believed that Louis de Buade de Frontenac, who disliked the order, strongly influenced the ending of their publication. In France, the political and religious debates over the accommodationist approach practised by the Jesuits in their overseas missions probably also resulted in the cessation of its publication.

== Criticism ==
As the Jesuits used The Jesuit Relations to help raise money for the missions, scholars have scrutinized the reports for the possibility of textual incongruity or fictionalized accounts. Certainly, the Jesuits may have worked to convey optimism about their progress in converting the Indigenous peoples, as it was very slow. There are also numerous examples of Jesuits' bias against Indigenous peoples within these texts and of deliberate attempts to interpret Indigenous customs through a European lens.

When examined critically, The Jesuit Relations can function as an important resource in the study of cultural exchange that occurred between the settlers of New France and the Indigenous peoples because many of the missionaries made more of an attempt to immerse themselves within Indigenous societies and to understand their cultures and practices than other European settlers.

Because of the wide distribution of the letters after publication, scholars ask the question of who decided the relevance of information contained in these field letters. Although the Jesuits tried to avoid disclosing any compromise in their principles, "it is possible to detect evidence of soul-searching and shifting points of view" relative to their success at converting Indigenous peoples. After extensive cultural immersion, some missionaries may have adopted certain Indigenous ways of life or cultural practices. Jesuit officials in France would be liable to omit any threat to their philosophies in the final document. The issue concerns less the basic accuracy of the Jesuit Relations than the "manipulative literary devices" that were employed by the editors. The prominent Jesuit Relations scholar Allan Greer notes that European writings were popularly documented in one of two forms, as travel narratives or as encyclopedic catalogs. He also notes that the Jesuits obscured the boundaries between the two genres in an attempt to raise funds to continue Jesuit missions in New France: "One of the peculiarities of the Jesuit Relations is that they combine both types of writing: Jacques Marquette's personal narrative of his trip down the Mississippi, for example, shares space with Jean de Brébeuf's systematic description of Huron society."

== Content ==
=== Anthropology from a Jesuit perspective ===
Given the Jesuits' objectives, "A few graphic accounts of persecution could be more effective fund-raisers than uninterrupted tales of triumph. Ironically, therefore, Jesuit preconceptions about the difficulty of their chore produced a more balanced record of their successes and failures than might be expected."

Because the texts were used to raise revenue for the Jesuit cause, they may demonstrate exaggerations of the progress in converting Indigenous peoples as well as dramatized accounts of encounters. Additionally, the Jesuits often wrote about the fighting that took place between Indigenous tribes from a perspective of horror despite the consistent warring in Europe at the time.

The Jesuit missionaries believed that through developing an in-depth understanding of Indigenous cultures, they could convert more people. One prominent example, Jean de Brébeuf, was known for his attempts to immerse himself in the Hurons' language, culture, and religious customs. Specifically, in an entry titled "What the Hurons Think about Their Origin," Brébeuf explained to the audience a Huron creation story by seeking allusions to the Biblical creation story in his description.

Paul Le Jeune also described some customs of the Hurons, such as their hunting and fishing practices. He attempted to explain the spiritual context for certain hunting practices, such as explanations for how and why the Iroquois had specific rituals for hunting beaver. In the text, he expresses skepticism for these traditions' validity.

=== Martyrdom ===
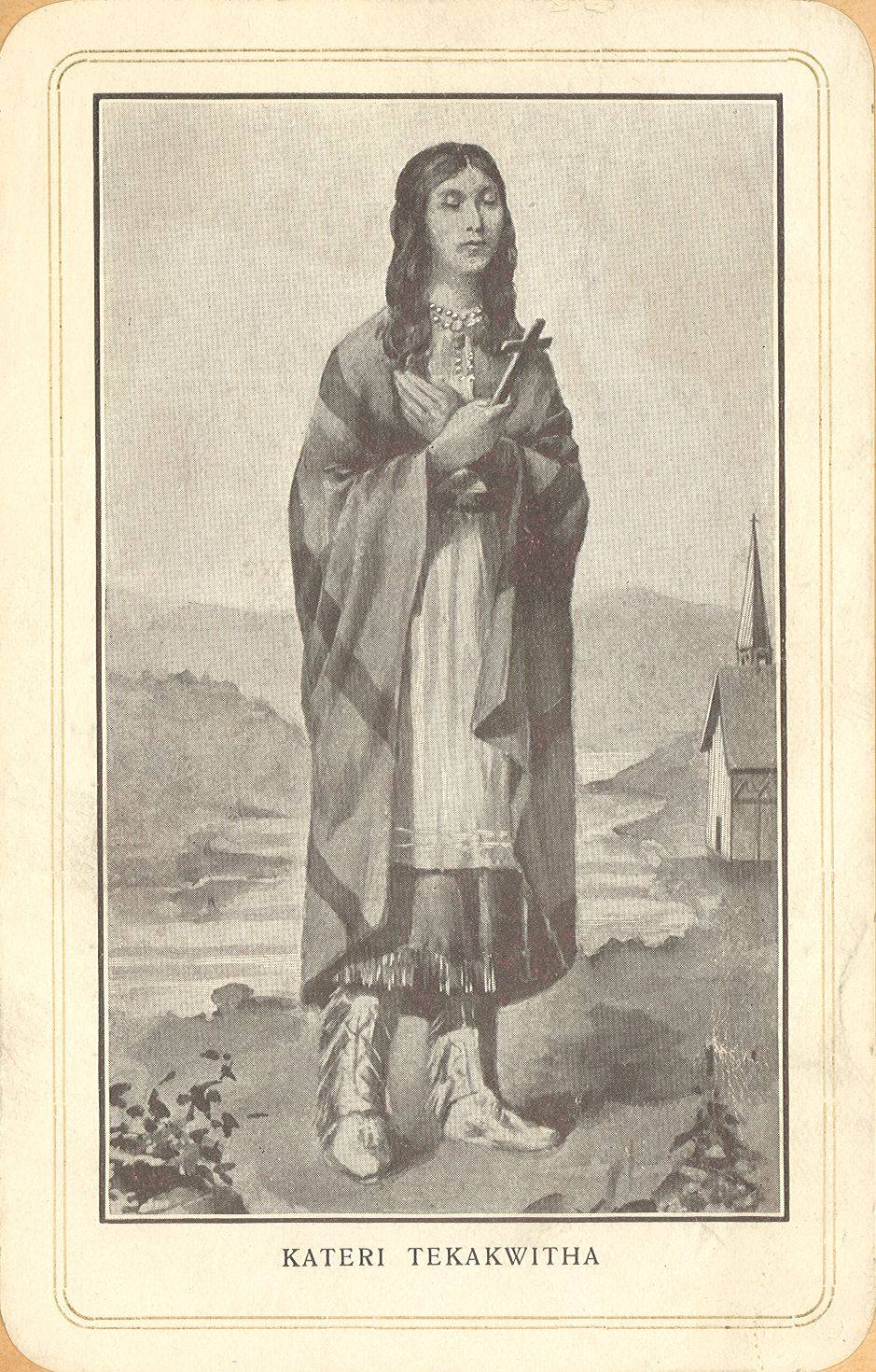
St. Kateri Tekakwitha, famous for her conversion to Catholicism.

Another important theme in these texts is that of martyrdom. The Relations included descriptions of Jesuit missionaries being killed or maimed, for example, the death of Isaac Jogues, who died after being captured by the Mohawk in 1646. There is also a graphic description of Brébeuf's death in 1649. The text describes the self-mortification of Kateri Tekakwitha, an Algonquin-Mohawk woman who converted to Catholicism and lived in the Jesuit mission of Sault Saint-Louis. A Relation detailing her story was published in 1744. The descriptions of martyrdom were likely used to keep justifying the Jesuits' attempts to convert Indigenous peoples and may have been exaggerated for that reason. Even when very few persons converted to Catholicism in a given year, the Jesuits would still use those examples as proof that some of them were greatly dedicated to their missions and that they were worthy of continuation.

=== Nature ===
While the soil in New France was good for agriculture, it was "interpreted as unused and barren," because it was undeveloped. The Jesuits' conceptualization of nature is important in understanding racialization in North America and how Europeans invented the false concept of human biological race. Initially, the Jesuits did not attribute differences between themselves and the indigenous peoples they met to biology. Instead, they believed that the inhabited environments of different groups of people explained why different peoples had different customs, culture, social norms, etc. Overall, their conceptualizations of nature "provided Jesuits with both a justification for mission work and a racial theory for Europeanization".

Thh soil in New France was good for agriculture but was "interpreted as unused and barren" by the Jesuits because it was undeveloped. Theor conceptualization of nature is important in understanding racialization in North America and how rge Europeans invented the false concept of human biological race. Initially, the Jesuits did not attribute differences between themselves and the Indigenous peoples to biology. Instead, they believed that the inhabited environments of different groups of people explained why different peoples had different customs, culture, social norms, etc. Overall, their conceptualizations of nature "provided Jesuits with both a justification for mission work and a racial theory for Europeanization."

== Compilation and modern publication ==
The Jesuit Relations were publicized as field letters from the missionary priests, reports of eyewitness, and testimony. The process of passage up the hierarchy meant that accounts would be summarized and shaped according to each man's view. The editing journey "began with detailed letters from priests in the field, the most important usually being the one brought down by the summer canoe brigade from the Huron Country. The superior at Quebec City would compile and edit these letters, paraphrasing some parts, copying others verbatim, and forwarding the whole package to France." The Jesuit Society in France approved any documents that they published and they likely altered some material before printing. Likewise, John Pollack notes that the account of Father Isaac Jogues in 1641 "is not an eyewitness testimony" but rather a second-hand relation by his superior, "drawn from Jogues' letters." Pollack notes further that the Relations "were edited by Jesuit missions in Paris before publication."

What are generally known as the Relations proper, addressed to the superior and published in Paris under direction of the provincial, commence with Le Jeune's Briève relation du voyage de la Nouvelle-France (1632). A duodecimo volume, neatly printed and bound in vellum, was then issued annually until 1673 from the presses of Sebastien Cramoisy and his brother Gabriel Cramoisy in Paris and of Jean Boullenger in Rouen. Several similar texts that were published prior to 1632 are sometimes considered part of the corpus, but they were not titled the Relations.

No single unified edition existed until Reuben Gold Thwaites, the secretary of the Wisconsin Historical Society, led the project to translate to English, unify, and cross-reference the numerous original Relations. Between 1896 and 1901, je and his associates compiled 73 volumes, including two volumes of indices. The Relations effectively comprise a large body of ethnographic material. He included many other papers, rare manuscripts, and letters from the archives of the Society of Jesus, spanning a period from the founding of the order or the colonization of Acadia in the 1610s to the mission in the Illinois Country in 1791.

The indices are comprehensive in scope and include titles such as "Marriage and Marriage Customs," "Courtship," "Divorce","Social Status of Women," "Songs and Singing," Dances," and "Games and Recreation". Much can be learned through the examination and study of the ethnographic and linguistic material compiled by the Jesuit missionaries in New France. The depth of the cross-referencing allows several hundred years of Indigenous+European interaction to be easily accessed.

While Thwaites is the first and arguably the best-known of the modern editions, others followed. Lucien Campeau SJ (1967–2003) discussed the textsthat he included and the historical events to which they refer; his work is considered to give the most detailed and exhaustive general overviews available.

== Indigenous resistance and reaction to the Jesuits ==
Some Indigenous peoples outwardly converted to Catholicism while still adhering to their traditional religion. When Jesuits attempted to force some Indigenous people into permanent settlements, which they believedwould make large-scale conversion easiest, many people simply refused or left those settlements. Furthermore, many Indigenous leaders deduced very quickly that Christianization was not the Jesuits' only intended outcome,and that it came alongside land theft and other attempts at Europeanization.

A Huron religious leader in the 1640s made a speech condemning Jesuit missionaries' plans to develop the land and noting how the Jesuit missionaries' presence resulted in higher mortality rates for the Hurons The Indigenous peoples often attacked Christianity and the changes made by the French, which reduced the succeses of conversion.

Tekakwitha's canonization, which took place in 2012, is controversial because some Indigenous people in North America believe that the Catholic Church needs to do more to account for the harms committed in its colonial past. They also believe that the canonization could gloss over that history. Others believe Tekakwitha's canonization to be a long-overdue honour.

== Context within France ==
The Relations were written during the Counter-Reformation in Europe,during which Catholicism gained popularity and the Church renewed itself. The Jesuits grew in power during this period and even achieved influence within King Louis XIV's court. This garnered suspicion and rivalry from other religious sects. The rivalry could potentially be a factor that propelled the Jesuits to carefully select the information ththat was included in the Relations.

Le Jeune wrote in the Relations his ideas of how the land in New France should be used, the natural resources that New France could offer France, and the possibility of increased employment of Frenchmen in New France. He also wrote in the Relations of the poverty of Indigenous people by comparing them to France's poor. That was largely to further convince the French government of the urgency of colonialization and to justify it as bringing wealth to indigenous people, rather than it being inherently violent. In fact, a primary objective of the Relations was to promote not only Jesuit religious interests but also French economic interests.

== Representation in other media ==
- The Canadian drama film Mission of Fear (1965) is based substantially on The Jesuit Relations.

== See also ==
- Lettres édifiantes et curieuses (1703–1776)

== Bibliography ==
- Blackburn, Carole (2000). Harvest of Souls: The Jesuit Missions and Colonialism in North America, 1632-1650. McGill-Queen's University Press. ISBN 978-0-7735-2047-9.
- Relations des jésuites: contenant ce qui s'est passé de plus remarquables dans les missions des pères de la Compagnie de Jésus dans la Nouvelle-France. Quebec: A. Côté. 1858.
- Colby, Charles W. (1901). "The Jesuit Relations". The American Historical Review. 7 (1): 36–55. doi:10.2307/1832531. JSTOR 1832531.
- Deslandres, Dominique (2000). "Exemplo aeque et verbo: The French Jesuits' Missionary World". In O'Malley, John W.; Bailey, Gauvin Alexander; Harris, Steven J.; Kennedy, T. Frank (eds.). The Jesuits: Cultures, Sciences and the Arts, 1540-1773. Toronto: University of Toronto Press. doi:10.3138/9781442681569. ISBN 978-1-4426-8156-9.
- Donnely, Joseph P. (1967). Thwaites' Jesuit Relations: Errata and Addenda. Chicago: Loyola University Press.
- Greer, Allan (2000). The Jesuit Relations: Natives and Missionaries in Seventeenth-Century North America. Bedford/St. Martin's. ISBN 978-0-312-16707-3. OCLC 964896863.
- Goddard, Peter A. (1998). "Converting the 'Sauvage': Jesuit and Montagnais in Seventeenth-Century New France". The Catholic Historical Review. 84 (2): 219–239. doi:10.1353/cat.1998.0069. JSTOR 25025209. S2CID 159140412.
- Leahey, Margaret J. (1995). "'Comment peut un muet prescher l'évangile?' Jesuit Missionaries and the Native Languages of New France". French Historical Studies. 19 (1): 105–131. doi:10.2307/286901. JSTOR 286901.
- "Mixed Reactions To First Native American Saint". Tell Me More. NPR. 10 February 2012.
- McCoy, James C. (1937). Jesuit relations of Canada, 1632-1673: A Bibliography. Paris: A. Rau.
- McShea, Bronwen Catherine (2013). "Presenting the 'Poor Miserable Savage' to French Urban Elites: Commentary on North American Living Conditions in Early Jesuit Relations". The Sixteenth Century Journal. 44 (3): 683–711. doi:10.1086/SCJ24244810. JSTOR 24244810.
- Perron, Paul (2003). "Settlement and Conversion: Jean de Brébeuf's Jesuit Relations of 1635 and 1636". Narratology and Text: Subjectivity and Identity in New France and Québécois Literature. University of Toronto Press. pp. 57–76. doi:10.3138/9781442677562. ISBN 978-0-8020-3688-9. JSTOR 10.3138/9781442677562.7.
- Perron, Paul (2003). "Narrating and Reading the Body: The Martyrdom of Isaac Jogues". Narratology and Text: Subjectivity and Identity in New France and Québécois Literature. University of Toronto Press. pp. 103–128. doi:10.3138/9781442677562. ISBN 978-0-8020-3688-9. JSTOR 10.3138/9781442677562.9.
- Podruchny, Carolyn; Labelle, Kathryn Magee (13 March 2012). "Jean de Brébeuf and the Wendat Voices of Seventeenth-Century New France". Renaissance and Reformation. 34 (1–2): 97–126. doi:10.33137/rr.v34i1-2.16169. hdl:10315/36608.
- Pollack, John (2009). The Heath Anthology of American Literature. Boston: Houghton Mifflin. p. 243.
- Richter, Daniel K. (1985). "Iroquois versus Iroquois: Jesuit Missions and Christianity in Village Politics, 1642-1686". Ethnohistory. 32 (1): 1–16. doi:10.2307/482090. JSTOR 482090.
- Ronda, James P. (September 1972). "The European Indian: Jesuit Civilization Planning in New France". Church History. 41 (3): 385–395. doi:10.2307/3164223. JSTOR 3164223. S2CID 153797421.
- True, Micah (March 2012). "Travel Writing, Ethnography, and the Colony-Centric Voyage of the Jesuit Relations from New France". American Review of Canadian Studies. 42 (1): 102–116. doi:10.1080/02722011.2012.649922. S2CID 144546729.
