= Wendat people =

Iroquoian-speaking people of the Great Lakes, Northern America

Wendat
- Pair of moccasins (c. 1850) made by the Wendat Nation of Quebec

Regions with significant populations
- Canada (southern Ontario; 17th century): 20,000–40,000

Languages
- Wendat language (Iroquoian)

Religion
- traditional Wendat religion; later Roman Catholicism

Related ethnic groups
- Petun, Neutral, Erie, Wenro, other Iroquoian peoples; successors: Wyandot people, Wendat Nation

The Wendat people, also known as the Huron, are the peoples of the Wendat Confederacy in present-day southern Ontario, which was forcibly disbanded in the 1650s but reestablished in 1999. The Wendat Confederacy originally consisted of several nations and was one of the principal Indigenous powers of the Great Lakes region in the early 17th century. They were defeated and dispersed by the Haudenosaunee during the Beaver Wars.

The Wendat first emerged as a confederacy of five nations in the St. Lawrence River Valley, especially in Southern Ontario, including the north shore of Lake Ontario. Their original homeland extended to the Georgian Bay of Lake Huron and Lake Simcoe in Ontario, Canada and occupied territory around the western part of the lake.

Two significant surviving groups of the Wendat population remained after their dispersal. One group relocated to Quebec, where their descendants form the present-day Wendat Nation. The Wendat Nation has two First Nations reserves at Wendake, Quebec. The other Wendat joined the Tionontati confederacy, who were in turn also displaced by the Haudenosaunee, with the refugees coalescing into the Wyandot people. In 1999, the Wendat Confederacy was reestablished as an organization uniting the Wendat Nation and the three modern Wyandot nations.

== Etymology ==
In the early 17th century, this Iroquoian people called themselves the Wendat, an autonym which means "Dwellers of the Peninsula" or "Islanders". The Wendat historic territory was bordered on three sides by the waters of Georgian Bay and Lake Simcoe. Similarly, in other Iroquoian languages, such as Cayuga, refer to this nation as Ohwehnagehó:nǫˀ "Island dwellers". Early French explorers referred to these Indigenous Peoples as the Huron, either from the French huron ("ruffian", "rustic"), or from hure ("boar's head"). According to tradition, French sailors thought that the bristly hairstyle of Wendat warriors resembled that of a boar. French fur traders and explorers referred to them as the "bon Iroquois" (good Iroquois).

An alternate etymology from Russell Errett in 1885 is that the name is from the Iroquoian term Irri-ronon ("Cat Nation"), a name also applied to the Erie nation. The French pronounced the name as Hirri-ronon, and it gradually became known as Hirr-on, and finally spelled in its present form, Huron. William Martin Beauchamp concurred in 1907 that Huron was at least related to the Iroquoian root ronon ("nation"). Other etymological possibilities are derived from the Algonquian words ka-ron ("straight coast") or tu-ron ("crooked coast").

== History ==
=== Origin, and organization: before 1650 ===
Early theories placed the Wendat's origin in the St. Lawrence Valley. Some historians or anthropologists proposed the people were located near the present-day site of Montreal and former sites of the historic St. Lawrence Iroquoian peoples. The Wendat spoke an Iroquoian language. Early 21st-century research in linguistics and archaeology confirm a historical connection between the Wendat and the St. Lawrence Iroquoians.

By the 15th century, the precontact Wendat occupied the large area from the north shores of most of the present-day Lake Ontario, northward up to the southeastern shores of Georgian Bay. From this homeland, they encountered the French explorer Samuel de Champlain in 1615. They historically spoke the Wendat language, a northern Iroquoian language. They were believed to number more than 30,000 at the time of European contact in the 1610s to 1620s.

In 1975 and 1978, archaeologists excavated a large 15th-century Wendat village, now called the Draper site, in Pickering, Ontario near Lake Ontario. In 2003, a larger village was discovered five kilometres (3.1 mi) away in Whitchurch-Stouffville; it is known as the Mantle Site and was occupied from the late 16th to early 17th century. It has been renamed the Jean-Baptiste Lainé Site, named in honor of a decorated Huron-Wendat soldier of World War II whose name in French was Jean-Baptiste Lainé. All four Lainé brothers, from the Huron-Wendat Reserve in Wendake, Quebec, fought through and survived the WWII. (Note: Both the Draper Site, near Pickering, Ontario, and the larger Mantle Site villages are in territory that may have historically been lands of either the Neutral people or Tobacco people (Petun). Each of these two peoples were Iroquoian-speaking and near relatives of the Huron. The Tobacco people are known to have also occupied the western 65 miles (105 km) stretch of the south shore of Lake Ontario. Their survivors are known to have consolidated populations with the Huron, later developing as the Wyandot.)

Each of the sites had been surrounded by a defensive wooden palisade, as was typical of regional cultures. Four Wendat ancestral village sites have been excavated in Whitchurch-Stouffville. The large Mantle site had more than 70 multifamily longhouses. (Note: longhouses could reach over 100 feet (30.5 m) in length, and 80 feet (24 m) was common.) Based on radiocarbon dating, it has been determined to have been occupied from 1587 to 1623. Its population was estimated at 1500–2000 persons.

Canadian archaeologist James F. Pendergast states:

Indeed, there is now every indication that the late precontact Huron and their immediate antecedents developed in a distinct Huron homeland in southern Ontario along the north shore of Lake Ontario. Subsequently, they moved from there to their historic territory on Georgian Bay, where Champlain encountered them in 1615.

The Wendat were not a single nation, but a confederacy of several nations who had mutually intelligible languages.

These nations included:

- Arendaenronnon ("people of the lying rock")
- Atahontaenrat ("two white ears", referring to "deer people")
- Ataronchronon ("people of the bog")
- Attinniaoenten ("people of the bear")
- Hatingeennonniahak ("makers of cords for nets").

The Attinniaoenten and Hatingeennonniahak first confederated in the 15th century. Arendaenronnon joined them about 1590, and the Atahontaenrat joined around 1610. The fifth group, the Ataronchronon may not have attained full membership in the confederacy, and may have been a division of the Attignawantan.

The largest Wendat settlement and capital of the confederacy, at least during the time of Jean de Brébeuf and the Jesuits was located at Ossossane. When Gabriel Sagard was among them however, Quienonascaran was the principal village of the Attignawantan, when Samuel de Champlain and Father Joseph Le Caron were among the Wendat in 1615, a village called Carhagouha may have been the capital. Modern-day Elmvale, Ontario developed near that site. The Wendat called their traditional territory Wendake.

Closely relatives of the Wendat were the Tionontate, an Iroquoian language-speaking group whom the French called the Petun (Tobacco), for their cultivation of that crop. They lived further south and were divided into two nations: the Deer and the Wolves. Considering that they formed the core of the nation later known as the Wyandot, they too may have called themselves Wendat.

There were ongoing hostilities between the Wendat and the Haudenosaunee, another powerful confederacy, but the Wendat had an alliance with the neighboring Algonquian-speaking peoples.

Tuberculosis became endemic among the Wendat, aggravated by their close and smoky living conditions in the longhouses. Despite this, the Wendat on the whole were healthy. The Jesuits wrote that the Wendat effectively employed natural remedies and were "more healthy than we".

=== European contact ===
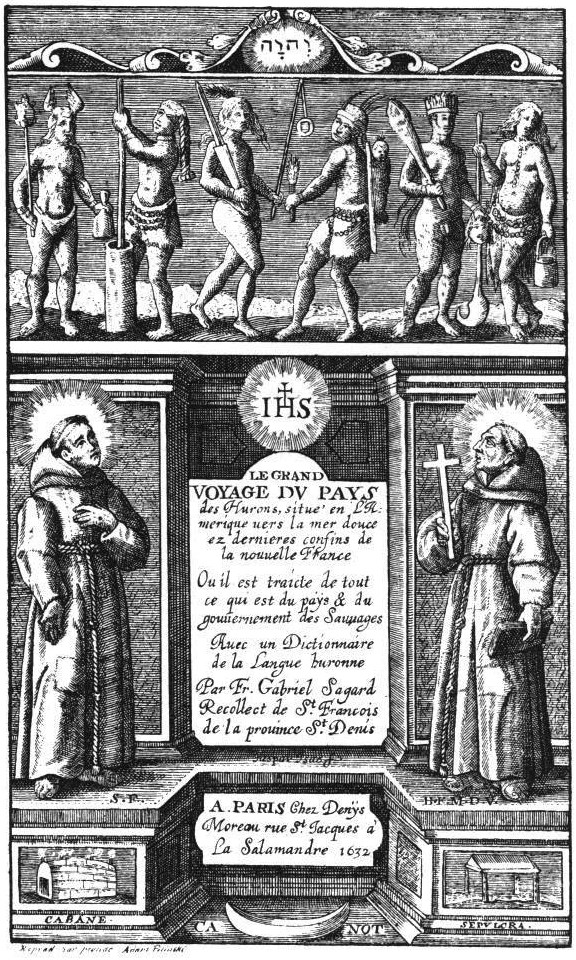
Le Grand Voyage du Pays des Hurons, Gabriel Sagard, 1632

The earliest written accounts of the Wendat were made by the French, who began exploring North America in the 16th century. News of the Europeans reached the Wendat, particularly when Samuel de Champlain explored the Saint Lawrence River in the early 17th century. Some Wendat decided to go and meet the Europeans. Atironta, the principal leader of the Arendarhonon nation, went to Quebec and allied with the French in 1609.

The Jesuit Relations of 1639 describes the Wendat:

They are robust, and all are much taller than the French. Their only covering is a beaver skin, which they wear upon their shoulders in the form of a mantle; shoes and leggings in winter, a tobacco pouch behind the back, a pipe in the hand; around their necks and arms bead necklaces and bracelets of porcelain; they also suspend these from their ears, and around their locks of hair. They grease their hair and faces; they also streak their faces with black and red paint.

— François du Peron, Jesuit Relations, Volume XV

The total population of the Wendat at the time of European contact has been estimated at 20,000 to 40,000 people. From 1634 to 1640, the Wendat were devastated by Eurasian infectious diseases, such as measles and smallpox. The Indigenous peoples of North America had no acquired immunity to these diseases and suffered very high mortality rates. Epidemiological studies have shown that beginning in 1634, more European children emigrated with their families to the New World from cities in France, England and the Netherlands, who were carriers of endemic smallpox. Historians believe the disease spread from European colonists to the Wendat and other nations, often through contact with traders.

After 1634, Wendat numbers were drastically reduced by the epidemics of new infectious diseases carried by Europeans. So many Wendat died that they were forced to abandon many of their villages and agricultural areas. About half to two-thirds of the population died in the epidemics, decreasing the population to about 12,000. Such losses had a high social cost, devastating families and clans, and disrupting their society's structure and traditions.

=== Dispersal ===
Before the French arrived, the Wendat had already been in conflict with the Haudenosaunee Confederacy (Five Nations or Iroquois) to the south. To fulfill ever growing European economic demands, conflicts among natives intensified significantly as they struggled to control the lucrative fur trade and survive. The French allied with the Wendat because they were one of the most successful trading countries at the time. The Haudenosaunee tended to ally with the Dutch and later English, who settled at Albany and in the Mohawk Valley of their New York territory.

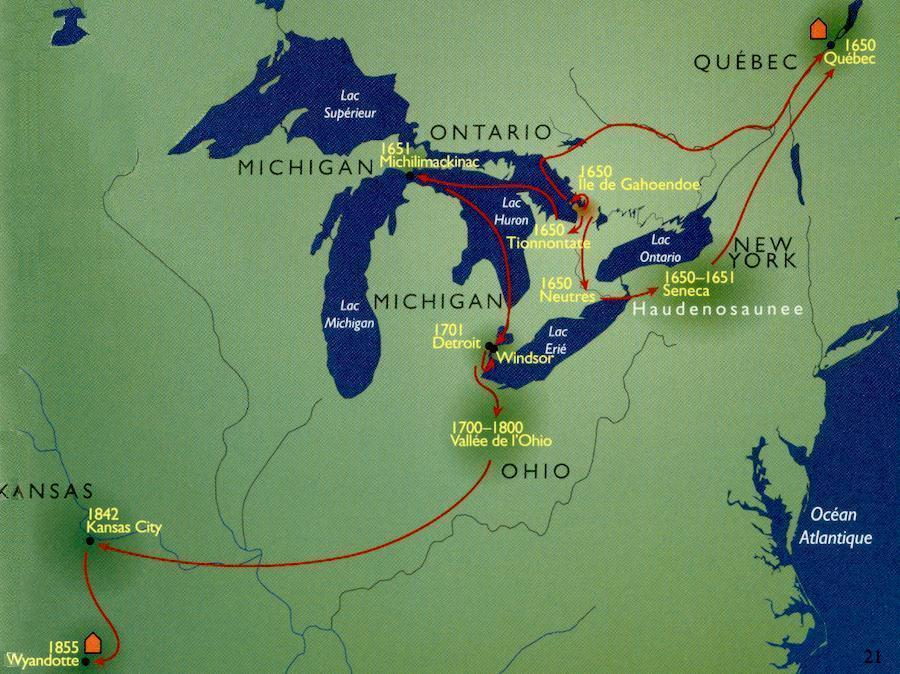
Trek of Wendat diaspora

The introduction of European weapons and economic demands increased competition and the severity of inter-tribal warfare. While the Haudenosaunee could easily obtain guns in exchange for furs from Dutch traders in New York, the Wendat were required to profess Christianity to obtain a gun from French traders in Canada. Therefore, they were unprepared, on March 16, 1649, when a Haudenosaunee war party of about 1,000 entered Wendake and burned the Wendat mission villages of St. Ignace and St. Louis in present-day Simcoe County, Ontario, killing about 300 people. The Haudenosaunee also killed many of the Jesuit missionaries, who have since been honored as North American Martyrs. The surviving Jesuits burned the mission after abandoning it to prevent its capture. The Haudenosaunee attack shocked and frightened the surviving Wendat. They were geographically cut off from trade with the Dutch and English by their attackers, who had access to more trade with the local Europeans, especially the Dutch. This forced them to continue to use tools and weapons like clubs, bows and arrows, stone scrapers, and cutters. This is compared to the near-universal use of European iron tools by Haudenosaunee. Wendat trade routes were consistently pillaged by raiders, and the lack of firearms discouraged the Wendat's trade with the French, at least without French protection. As a result of their lack of exposure, the Wendat did not have as much experience using firearms compared to their neighbors, putting them at a significant disadvantage when firearms were available to them, and when available, their possession of firearms made them a larger target for Haudenosaunee aggression.

The weakened Wendat were dispersed by the war in 1649 waged by the Haudenosaunee Confederacy, then based largely south of the Great Lakes in New York and Pennsylvania. Archaeological evidence of this displacement has been uncovered at the Rock Island II Site in Wisconsin. The American Heritage Book of Indians editors write that the Huron suffered an attack during the depths of winter in March 1649, when the Haudenosaunee had established a war camp within Wendat territory. The Haudenosaunee attacked with more than 1,000 warriors, destroying two Wendat towns and severely damaging most of a third. Many Wendat were slain or forcibly assimilated into the Haudenosaunee. When other Wendat learned about this, they panicked, fleeing their homeland and moving west. In the event, the northern shore of Lake Ontario came under the control of the Haudenosaunee.

By May 1, 1649, the Wendat had burned 15 of their villages to prevent their stores from being taken and fled as refugees to surrounding areas. About 10,000 fled to Gahoendoe (now also called Christian Island). Most who fled to the island starved over the winter, as it was an unproductive settlement and could not provide for them. After spending the bitter winter of 1649–50 on the island, some Wendat relocated near Quebec City, where they settled at Wendake. Absorbing other refugees, they became the Wendat Nation.

In 1649, other Wendat refugees joined the Iroquoian-speaking Tionontati Confederacy to their west (known as the Petun in French, also known as the Tobacco people for their chief commodity crop). These may originally have been a splinter group of the Wendat. (Note: The American Heritage Book of Indians says the Wyandot name may have evolved after the union of the two related peoples, the Tobacco (Tionontati/Petun) and the Huron (Wendat), who consolidated after the mid-17th-century invasions and conquests by Haudenosaunee League nations from south of the Great Lakes. The editors imply that the Tobacco people were directly and closely related to the Wendat, and had possibly developed from the four main tribes of the Wendat.) The Petun-Wendat, whose villages the Haudenosaunee attacked in the fall of 1649, fled to the upper Lake Michigan region, settling first at Green Bay, then at Michilimackinac. As their cultures consolidated, they became known as the Wyandot people.

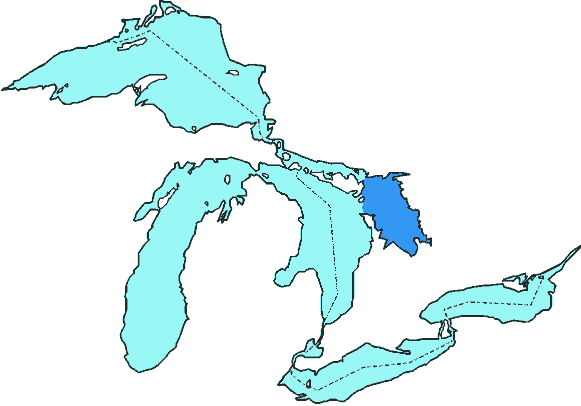
Main body of Georgian Bay highlighted on the map of the Great Lakes directly above Lake Ontario, with its outlet on the Saint Lawrence River. This is where the Huron encountered the French.

=== Huron–British Treaty of 1760 ===
On September 5, 1760, just prior to the capitulation of Montreal to British forces, Brigadier-General James Murray signed a "Treaty of Peace and Friendship" with a Huron-Wendat leader then residing in the settlement of Lorette. The text of the treaty reads as follows:

THESE are to certify that the CHIEF of the HURON tribe of Indians, having come to me in the name of His Nation, to submit to His BRITANNICK MAJESTY, and make Peace, has been received under my Protection, with his whole Tribe; and henceforth no English Officer or party is to molest, or interrupt them in returning to their Settlement at LORETTE; and they are received upon the same terms with the Canadians, being allowed the free Exercise of their Religion, their Customs, and Liberty of trading with the English: – recommending it to the Officers commanding the Posts, to treat them kindly.

Given under my hand at Longueuil, this 5th day of September 1760.

By the Genl's Command, JA. MURRAY.
JOHN CONAN,
Adjut. Genl.

The treaty recognized the Wendat as a distinct nation and guaranteed that the British would not interfere with the nation's internal affairs. In 1990, the Supreme Court of Canada, ruling in R v Sioui, found that the Huron-British Treaty of 1760 was still valid and binding on the Canadian Crown. Accordingly, the exercise of Wendat religion, customs, and trade benefited from continuing Canadian constitutional protection throughout the territory frequented by the tribe during the period the treaty was concluded.

== Recognized Wendat nations ==
In Canada, there is one Wendat First Nation:

- The Wendat Nation is based on two reserves in Wendake, Quebec, now within the Quebec City limits. The First Nation had approximately 6,980 members in 2021, who primarily speak French as their first language and are Roman Catholic. They have begun revitalizing the Wendat language among their children. For many decades, a leading source of income for the Wendat of Quebec has been selling pottery, snowshoes, summer and winter moccasins, and other locally produced crafts.

During the 20th century, contemporary Wyandot asserted their culture and identity, including their Wendat ancestry. On August 27, 1999, representatives of the far-flung Wyandot groups from Kansas, Oklahoma, and Michigan joined with the Huron-Wendat and gathered at their historic homeland in Midland, Ontario. There they formally re-established the Wendat Confederacy.

== Culture ==
Like other Iroquoian-speaking peoples, the Wendat have historically been sedentary farmers who supplemented their diet with hunting and fishing. The women historically cultivated several varieties of maize, squash, and beans (the "Three Sisters") as the mainstay of their diet, saving seeds of various types, and working to produce the best crops for different purposes. They have also collected nuts, fruit, and wild root vegetables, with their preparation of this produce supplemented primarily by fish caught by the men. The men historically hunt deer and other animals available during the game seasons. Women have traditionally done most of the crop planting, cultivation, and processing, although men help with the heaviest work of clearing fields or, historically, fortifying villages with wooden palisades. Wood has traditionally been gathered and brush cleared by the slash-and-burn method. Each family has traditionally owned a plot of land which they farmed, which then reverted to the common property of the community when the individual family no longer used it.

Historically, the Wendat have lived in villages spanning from one to ten acres (40,000 m^{2}), most of which were strongly fortified and enclosed by high and strong palisades of wood in double and sometimes triple rows for defense against enemy attack. They also lived in longhouses covered with tree bark similar to their relatives, which could house twenty or more families in one dwelling, and were in different lengths, some being thirty or forty feet in length. A typical village or town historically had 900 to 1,600 people organized into 30 or 40 longhouses. Towns were moved about every ten years as the soil became less fertile and the nearby forest – from which they took firewood – grew thin. The Wendat engaged in trade with neighboring countries, notably for tobacco with the neighboring Tionontati and Neutral confederacies.

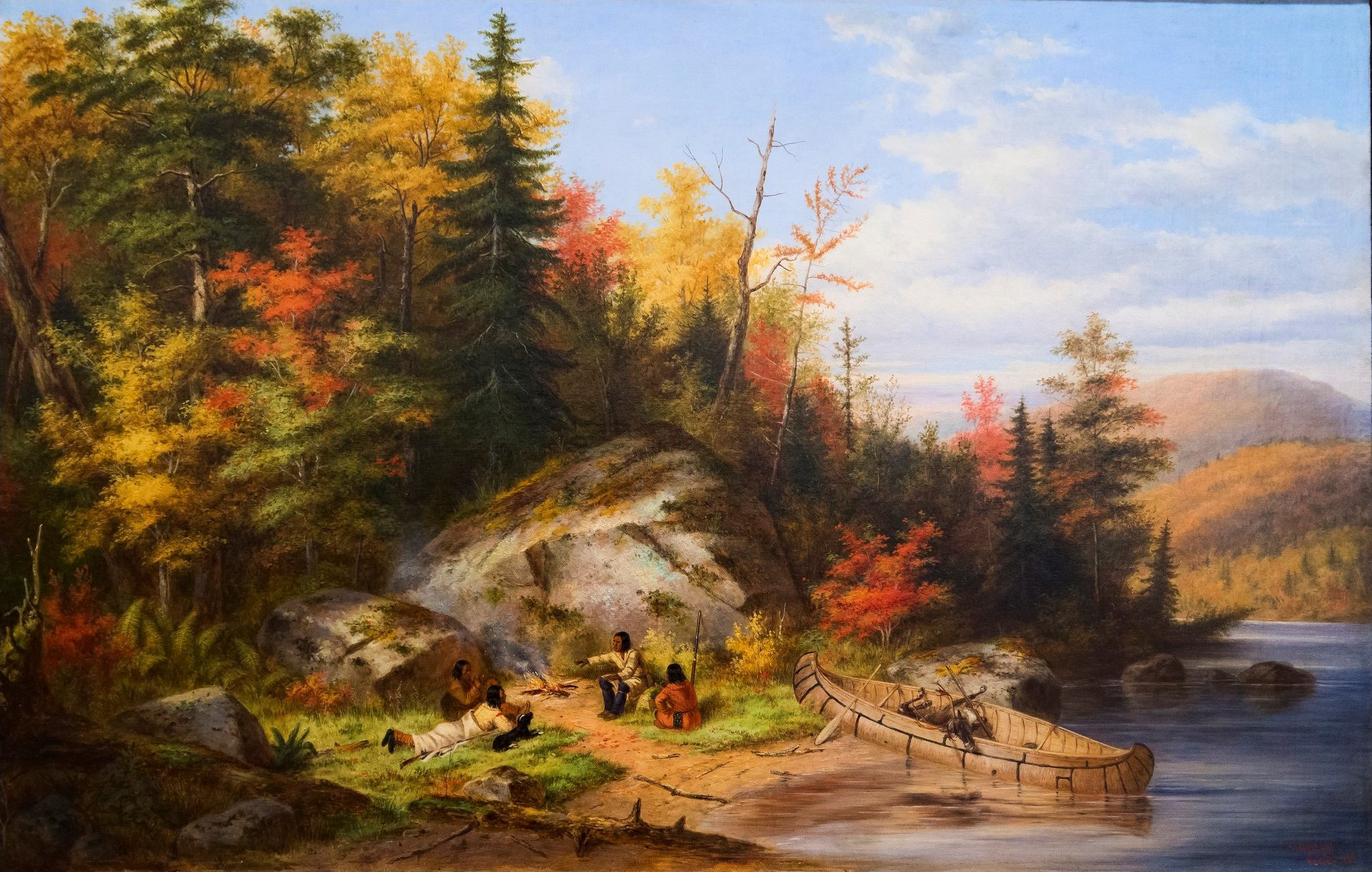
Huron Hunters Camping at the Big Rock of Lake Lagon, by Cornelius Krieghoff, 1862

The Wendat way of life emphasized gender roles in practice. Men set off for war or hunted for game to feed their people. Women made the clothes, cooked and processed game, farmed, and raised the children.

The Wendat have traditionally followed a matrilineal kinship system, with children considered born to the mother's lineage, their status inherited from hers. In this way, her older brother is traditionally more important to her sons than their biological father.

As children grow older, they slowly grow into their roles within their society. Both genders learn from adults how to do certain things that later will help the community. For example, as children, girls learn how to make doll clothing, which teaches them the skills needed to make garments for people. Boys are given miniature bows so they may practice hunting very small game. All young children are integrated into society and given small tasks and responsibilities based on their age. Boys accompany men on some hunting events to learn firsthand how to hunt, receive tips on what to do while hunting, and develop needed skills for when they are older. Girls learn the same way, by following and watching the women conduct their daily routines, mimicking them on a smaller scale.

== Religion ==
Wendat medicine men were called arendiwane, a term denoting a person with great supernatural power. A arendiwane diagnosed diseases by consulting dreams; during or after his dreams, a spirit known as an oki would visit him in the form of a fire, ghost, or bird (such as a crow or eagle) and explain the cause of the illness and its cure. These medicine men also administered to the dying, interpreting their dreams and visions. The Wendat believed that those who were dying had a special connection to the world of the supernatural and took their dreams and visions very seriously, considering them especially trustworthy sources of information. Requests from the dying were considered "incontestable."

Their beliefs surrounding visions and dreams likely carried over when some Wendat people began converting to Christianity. Several accounts of seventeenth-century Christianized Wendats on their deathbed include visions of Heaven and Jesus, which influenced believers' lives on earth. For example, one account describes a dying woman requesting a bead bracelet from a local missionary named Jean de Brébeuf, because she had learned in a dying vision that her recently deceased sister had received such a bracelet from him.

According to Wendat mythology, Iosheka created the first man and woman and taught them many skills, including all their religious ceremonies and rituals, the ability to fight evil spirits, healing, and the use of the sacrament of tobacco.

== War ==
And the thunder and lightning of his [Champlain's] arquebus echoed for 150 years. The bold foe had been Mohawk. The Five Nations nursed a dogged animosity toward the French, with only a few interludes of real peace, from that time onward.

— William Brandon, American Heritage Book of Indians

Samuel de Champlain made enemies of the Haudenosaunee when he fought alongside a war party of Wendat and Algonquian-speaking peoples who demanded that he assist them in their ongoing conflict against their political rival. The Haudenosaunee fought with the French for nearly one hundred years.

== See also ==
- Beaver Wars
- Huron Feast of the Dead
- Huronia (region)
- Jesuit Missions amongst the Huron
- Kondiaronk

== General references ==
- Axtell, James (1981). The Indian Peoples of Eastern America: A Documentary History of the Sexes. Oxford University Press. ISBN 978-0-19-502741-9.
- Brandon, William (1961). Alvin M. Josephy (ed.). The American Heritage Book of Indians. American Heritage – Simon & Schuster. pp. 174–219. ISBN 9780070012745.
- Dickason, Olive (1996). "Huron/Wyandot". In Frederick E. Hoxie (ed.). Encyclopedia of North American Indians. Houghton Mifflin. pp. 263–265. ISBN 978-0-395-66921-1.
- Garrad, Charles; Heidenreich, Conrad E. (1978). "Khionontateronon (Petun)". In Bruce Trigger (ed.). Handbook of North American Indians. Vol. 15, Northeastern Indians. Smithsonian Institution. pp. 394–397. ISBN 978-0-1600-4575-2.
- Heidenreich, Conrad E. (1978). "Huron". In Bruce Trigger (ed.). Handbook of the North American Indian. Vol. 15, Northeastern Indians. Smithsonian Institution. pp. 368–388. ISBN 978-0-1600-4575-2.
- Labelle, Kathryn Magee (2013). Dispersed but Not Destroyed: A History of the Seventeenth-Century Wendat People. UBC Press. ISBN 978-0-7748-2556-6
- Sagard, Gabriel (1865) [1632]. Le Grand Voyage du Pays des Hurons Situé en l'Amérique vers la Mer Douce, ès Derniers Confins de la Nouvelle France dite Canada: avec un Dictionnaire de la Langue Huronne [The Great Voyage of the Huron Country Located in America towards the Sweet Sea, in the last reaches of the New France known as Canada: with a Dictionary of the Huron language] (in French). Vol. I. Paris: Librairie Tross.
- Sagard, Gabriel (1865) [1632]. Le Grand Voyage du Pays des Hurons Situé en l'Amérique vers la Mer Douce, ès Derniers Confins de la Nouvelle France dite Canada: avec un Dictionnaire de la Langue Huronne [The Great Voyage of the Huron Country Located in America towards the Sweet Sea, in the last reaches of the New France known as Canada: with a dictionary of the Huron language] (in French). Vol. II. Paris: Librairie Tross.
- Trigger, Bruce G. (1969). The Huron Farmers of the North. Holt, Rinehart and Winston.
- Trigger, Bruce G. (1987). The Children of Aataentsic: A History of the Huron People to 1660. McGill-Queen's University Press. ISBN 978-0-7735-0627-5.
