= Huron Feast of the Dead =

Mortuary custom of the Wyandot people

The Huron Feast of the Dead was a mortuary custom of the Wendat/Wyandot of what is today central Ontario, Canada, which involved the disinterment of deceased relatives from their initial individual graves followed by their reburial in a final communal grave. A time for both mourning and celebration, the custom became spiritually and culturally significant.

Early in the custom's development, as whole villages moved to a new location, other Wendat would travel to join them in arranging mass reburials of their dead, who were transported to the new location. The people would take dead bodies out of their first graves and clean the remains in preparation for reburial in a new location. Customs evolved over the centuries as populations migrated and increased. They continued to follow traditional beliefs about the afterlife. The arrival of Europeans added new aspects to the process. The Wendat adopted a practice of exchanging material gifts as a central part of these festivals. Some among the Wendat criticized these practices. The French missionary Jean de Brébeuf discussed such a ceremony which he saw in 1636 at the Wendat capital of Ossossané. (now in Simcoe County, Ontario). Twentieth-century archeological excavations revealed and confirmed information about these traditions.

== Mortuary customs in the Pre-Contact era ==
In the twelfth and thirteenth centuries, Wendat communities rapidly expanded in population and in the territory they occupied. Settlements were small compared to later standards and their ossuaries were small. Ceremonies were carried out independently as each village would separately rebury their dead when they moved. In contrast to later examples, no ossuary ever held more than thirty individuals. The survivors left modest grave offerings made of non-durable materials. Burials were communal, a characteristic that persisted as other aspects of Wendat culture changed.

By the 1500s Wendat population growth began to stabilize. With this demographic change, well before European arrival, the traditional mortuary customs started evolving into what are more recognizable as Feasts of the Dead. With the increase of population, it became the norm to wait for a period of several years between the first and the second burial. This change considerably increased the size of the ossuaries, as the extended period meant that graves held several hundred individuals.

Wendat communities changed the location of their village every ten to fifteen years. They believed that they had to protect their dead when they moved, and they started to rebury them every time a large village migrated. The ceremonies occurred at the end of the winter months, before the Wendat had to undertake tasks associated with agriculture and spring hunting. The symbolism of the end of winter and start of spring fit into their beliefs that separated the living and the dead.

By the period when the Wyandot migrated to Wendake (on the south shore of Georgian Bay in modern-day Simcoe and Grey counties in Ontario), these mortuary rituals came to represent the unity and friendship of Wyandot bands. Multiple villages would gather together for combined ceremonies and to exchange gifts. The exchange of gifts and the symbolism of a united burial ground became defining elements of the Feasts of the Dead.

Gabriel Sagard, a French missionary writing in the 1620s, described the purpose of the rituals:

"By means of these ceremonies and gatherings they contract new unions and friendships amongst themselves, saying that, just as the bones of their deceased relatives and friends are gathered together and united in one place, so also they themselves ought during their lives to live all together in the same unity and harmony, like good kinsmen and friends."

These ceremonies of remembrance and celebration fostered a sense of community among the people. They continued as an important community building practice through the seventeenth century.

== Effect of European contact on traditional mortuary customs ==
Contact with Europeans introduced new goods and materials that were extremely useful in everyday life. The acquisition of these goods transformed Wyandot society and by extension, the nature of their mortuary customs as well. In the pre-contact era, material grave offerings had been minimal, but the quantity and quality of material goods offered to the deceased became a sign of reverence. Significant grave offerings were expected as they demonstrated the generosity and wealth of the giver, as well as theoretically guaranteeing the goodwill of the deceased souls.

This increase was not only due to the circulation of European goods of more durable materials. Archaeological excavations and historical accounts indicate that it became customary to offer a great number of Indigenous items too. The fur trade increased the circulation of goods between native groups, and new tools facilitated craftsmanship. The people used their new material wealth to demonstrate devotion to the most sacred of traditional customs.

The feast had evolved into a way to strengthen alliances, but after European contact, this became all the more important. It was customary to invite friends and relatives from other tribes to promote Wendat unity. All communities were warned when a feast was to take place, and the dead were transported from great distances so friends and relatives could be buried together.

Members of other native groups were often invited, in order to confirm powerful bonds, but combined burials among different tribes were rare. It was in this period that the Feasts of the dead were most impressive. The ties were reaffirmed by many gifts, and the presence of foreigners encouraged the Wendat to impress their visitors. This change in customs both encouraged and required the fur trade, as the process of renewal of alliances was a key part of the Feasts. In 1636 French missionaries were invited to a ceremony to ally with, and impress, the Europeans. There was also a secondary motivation to confirm the ties that maintained the fur trade.

== 1636 Feast of the Dead at Ossossané ==
Jean de Brébeuf, a Jesuit missionary, was invited in the spring of 1636 to a large Feast of the Dead outside the village of Ossossané, the capital of Wendake. His first-person account provided insight into contemporary Wendat mortuary customs and has remained the most cited source on the topic. The Wendat dispersal occurred in 1650, following epidemics, and conflict with the more powerful Haudenosaunee Confederacy. Their cultural traditions changed after this upheaval. Brébeuf's account is a unique view of a notable feast that occurred at the height of Wendat mortuary customs just before their rapid decline.

The Feast of the Dead took place over a period of ten days. During the first eight days, the participants gathered and prepared the bodies for the reburial. Relatives of the deceased took out their remains, and the corpses, in various degrees of putrefaction, were clothed with beaver robes. Flesh and skin were removed from the corpses and the bones were individually cleaned. They were wrapped again in another set of beaver furs. Generally women carried out this task, and any sign of revulsion was traditionally discouraged. Wrapped in fur packages, the bones were returned to the homes of relatives, where a feast was held in memory of the dead. Gifts and offerings were placed next to these packages, and visitors were welcomed and treated generously. This was a time to feast, and gather the food and offerings to be used for the main burial event.

The village leader announced when all families should transport the bodies. The journey to the new site was often long (possibly several days) and was a time for public mourning, punctuated by sharp cries of the participants. When the chief decided and everyone was present, all would gather around the burial pit for the main ceremony.

1724 engraving depicting the traditional Huron Feast of the Dead.

Brébeuf described the scene:

"There was in the middle of it a great pit, about ten feet deep and five fathoms in diameter. (...) Above rose many poles, trimmed and well arranged, with cross poles to attach the bundles of souls. (...)They laid on the ground their parcels (...) They unfolded also their bundles of robes and all the presents they had brought, and placed them upon poles (...) in order to give foreigners time to view the wealth and magnificence of the country."

He noted there were 15 to 20 baptized Huron among the dead (rings with Christian symbols were later found at the site.) That evening, the bodies were lowered into the pit with three kettles, which were to help the souls reach the after life. If a bundle fell, it was time for everything else (bundles, gifts, corn, wooden stakes and sand) to be thrown in as well. As the pit was filled and covered over, the crowds screamed and sang. Brébeuf described the scene as emotional and chaotic, representing the Wendat's perception of mortality and life in general.

The following and final morning consisted of gift giving among the living; it was a time for celebration. Those who had made the journey were thanked, and ties were reaffirmed.

== End of the Feasts ==
A high rate of mortality from infectious European diseases and warfare due to the fur trade increased the frequency and size of the Feasts of the Dead until the Wyandot dispersal in the middle of the seventeenth century. The last reported Feast of the Dead occurred in 1695. It was held jointly by the Wyandot and Odawa nations.

== Archaeology ==
Modern archaeology has revealed significant data about Wendat mortuary customs. It has revealed otherwise unattainable details about pre-contact or undocumented burial sites. Archaeological evidence has also been used to verify claims made by Brébeuf about the 1636 feast.

Archaeological finds from burial sites began in the early nineteenth century. Originally these finds were often accidental. As farmers moved into the region north of Lake Ontario, they unintentionally plowed up areas that had once been Wendat ossuaries. The bones and grave goods had otherwise been untouched since they had been ritually buried. First amateurs, and later professionals documented the finds and conducted excavations. The gathered information has provided answers to several questions.

Pre-contact era finds have been used to interpret burial practices and understand how customs changed over the course of three centuries.

Find	Date	Number of Individuals	Durable Material Content
The Moatfield Ossuary	1300	87	1 effigy pipe
The Uxbridge Ossuary	1500	500	Several Shell Beads

Comparison with more recent finds confirmed the continued evolution of mortuary customs.

=== Ossossané excavation ===
Between 1947 and 1948, archaeologists from the Royal Ontario Museum uncovered the ossuary burial site of Ossossané, which Brébeuf had described in his account. Led by Kenneth E. Kidd, the excavation was hailed by contemporaries for its use of modern and efficient scientific techniques. These added to and confirmed knowledge of Huron feasts of the Dead. The 3-Inch method was a way to preserve the layers, and showed the order of individuals in graves and what burial goods were placed with them. The lavish nature of grave offerings was confirmed, as were other details from Brébeuf’s account. The Jesuit’s estimates concerning size of the pit, the scaffolding, and contents proved to be relatively accurate. Comparisons with older sites highlighted the evolution of these traditions. It also showed a dramatic decline in the average age of the dead, from 30 to 21, believed to be evidence of disease epidemics.

Find	Date	Number of Individuals	Durable Material Content
Ossossané	1636	at least 681	998 beads, 6 copper rings (1 Jesuit ring), two amerindian pipes, 1 key

== Modern controversies and conclusion ==
The 1947 excavation at Ossossané was carried out without any consultation with the Wyandot, which proved to be a later source of controversy.

In 1990, the U.S. Congress passed the Native American Graves Protection and Repatriation Act, which provided modern-day descendants of American native groups the right to demand the return of human remains from museums and other institutions. Its effects were felt in Canada as well. In 1999 the Royal Ontario Museum bowed to pressure and agreed to return the Ossossané remains to the Wendat groups for reburial according to their traditions.

The ceremony was held in Midland Ontario, a few miles away from Brébeuf’s grave. The dispersed Wyandot peoples were reunited on the morning of August 29, 1999. The human remains were lowered into a pit, with the items that had been dug up by Kenneth Kidd and his team. These were covered by earth, over which cement was poured, to ensure the remains were never disturbed again.

== See also ==
- Jean de Brébeuf
- Mythologies of the indigenous peoples of North America
- Sainte-Marie among the Hurons
- Taber Hill
- Wyandot religion
- Wendat people
- Wyandot people
