= Claude François (painter) =

French painter (1614–1685)

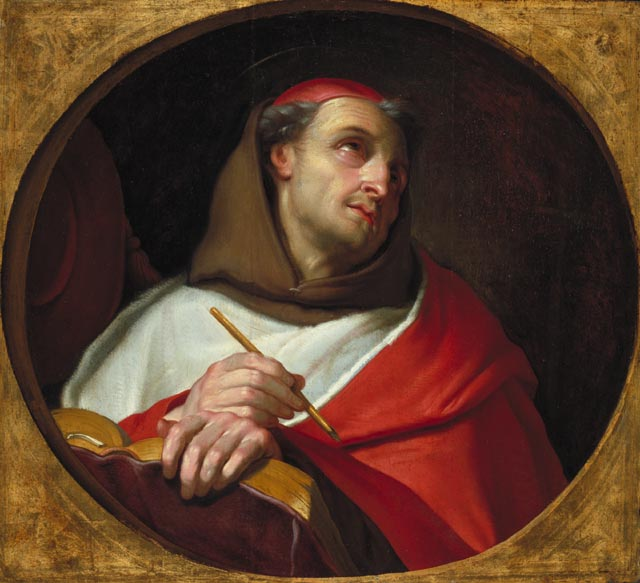
Saint Bonaventure by Frère Luc

Claude François (1614 – 17 May 1685) was a French painter and Recollect Franciscan friar. He is better known as Frère Luc ("Brother Luke"), the name he adopted after becoming a monk.

== Life ==
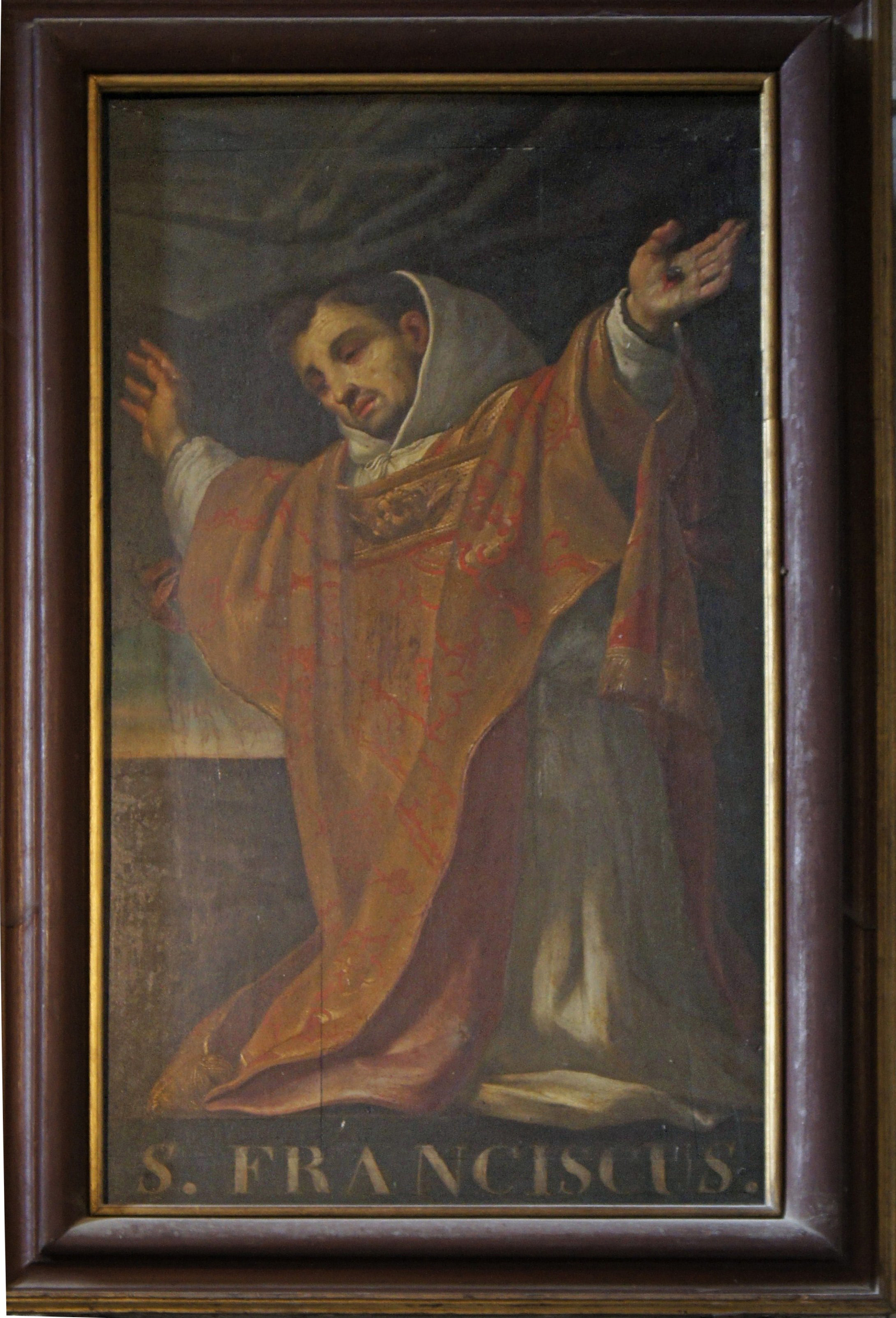
Saint Francis

He was born in Amiens and studied drawing and the initial principals of art there, before moving to Paris to complete his training under Simon Vouet, whose style he closely copied throughout his life. From there he went to Rome to copy the old masters there. It was also there that he painted an Assumption of the Virgin as a high altarpiece for the Jacobin church back in Amiens, aged only twenty. This painting, a copy from a work by Jacopo Bassano, was valued at 6,000 écus in 1635.

He then returned to Paris, where he took monastic vows aged 30 at the Récollets du faubourg Saint-Martin. It is said that he fell from the top of pont du Cange into the river Somme aged fifteen and only escaped death by a kind of miracle and that he had seen the Virgin Mary and promised her to become a monk. After fulfilling this promise, he produced a painting of saint Augustine presenting a dead child to the Madonna and Child, with a canvas shown behind her showing his fall into the Somme. Hardouin de Perefixe, archbishop of Paris, made several offers to ordain him as a priest, but Luc was so humble that he wanted no more than the diaconate.

He was sent to the Récollet monastery at Châlons-en-Champagne and briefly stayed at the one in Lesneven, before leaving for Quebec City early in 1670. During his fifteen-month stay in New France, Frère Luc created large religious history compositions, such as La Sainte Famille à la Huronne (The Holy Family with a Huron Woman). These artworks were designed to inspire faith and were intended for various churches and chapels in the capital and nearby areas. Frère Luc's contributions marked the start of using large works to adorn the sacred spaces of Quebec City, while also exploring themes of colonization and Christian missionary work. He also designed the reconstruction of Quebec's monastery and seminary. He returned to France at the end of 1671, working on the decorative paintings in the Louvre Palace. The chapel of the convent in Sézanne (the convent later became a hospital) still holds several works by him, since he stayed for some years in the convent. The canvases he produced as an altarpiece for the Récollet convent chapel in Châlons-en-Champagne are still in Châlons-en-Champagne, partly in the Musée des beaux-arts et d'archéologie de Châlons-en-Champagne and partly in the Collégiale Notre-Dame-en-Vaux. His final surviving painting is Our Lady of the Rosary, produced in 1680 for the chapel of the Salpêtrière.

His students included Roger de Piles, Arnould de Vuez and Claude Simpol.

== Works ==
- Frère Luc (né Claude François), L’ange gardien (The Guardian Angel), 1671, oil on canvas, 248 x 159.5 cm, Musée national des beaux-arts du Québec, Quebec City.
- Frère Luc (né Claude François), La Sainte Famille à la Huronne (The Holy Family with a Huron Woman), c.1671, oil on canvas, 121.9 x 106.7 cm, Musée des Ursulines de Québec, Pôle culturel du monastère des Ursulines, Quebec City.
- After 1664 and before 1685 : The Immaculate Conception, for the église Notre-Dame-de-la-Visitation de Champlain;
- Saint Memmius, painted for the Récollet monastery in Châlons, now in the Collégiale Notre-Dame-en-Vaux de Châlons-en-Champagne;
- Saint Francis, painted for the Récollet monastery in Châlons, now in the Collégiale Notre-Dame-en-Vaux de Châlons-en-Champagne;
- The Road to Calvary, in the Collégiale Notre-Dame-en-Vaux de Châlons-en-Champagne;
- Nativity (parish church of Saint-Michel in Lesneven)
- Musée de Picardie, Amiens. Puy d'Amiens from 1666, offered by François Quignon : "Croix aimable à Jésus quoiqu'ignominieuse".
- Ottawa, Musée des beaux-arts du Canada, Saint Bonaventure, achat en 1998.
- Musée des beaux-arts et d'archéologie de Châlons-en-Champagne, Saint Francis Presented to Christ, God Surrounded by Angels and Two Angels
- Musée de Fécamp, Achilles and Ulysses Leaving Scyros, Legs Fessard, 1995.
- Collégiale Notre-Dame-et-Saint-Loup de Montereau-Faut-Yonne, Mise au Tombeau.

== Bibliography ==
- (in French) Gaston Laplatte, Hôpital-hospice de Sézanne, fondé en 1164 par Henri Ier, comte de Champagne et de Brie. Notice sur les tableaux se trouvant dans la chapelle et la salle des délibérations de la commission administrative, Sézanne, imprimerie de A. Patoux, 1912.
- (in French) Marie-Thérèse Laureilhe, « Le Frère Luc (1614-1685), Récollet, peintre de saint François », Bulletin de la société de l'histoire de l'art français, 1984.
- (in French) Françoise Nicolle, Frère Luc, Un peintre du s XVIIe à Sézanne, Rotary Club de Sézanne, Sézanne, 1996.
- (in French) Jérôme Montcouquiol, "Quelques petits formats de frère Luc (1614-1685), on la tribunedelart.com
- (in French) Jérôme Montcouquiol et Jean-Christophe Baudequin, "Nouveaux suppléments à l'étude de frère Luc", http://www.latribunedelart.com/nouveaux-supplements-a-l-etude-de-frere-luc-1614-1685
