= Joseph de La Roche Daillon =

French Catholic missionary

Joseph de La Roche Daillon (died 1656, Paris) was a Franciscan Récollet priest and a French missionary to the Wendat (Huron) and Attawandaron (Neutral). He is remembered in Canada as an explorer and missionary, and in the United States for his alleged discovery of the first recorded source of petroleum in North America.

Daillon was the son of Jacques de La Roche, seigneur of Daillon in Anjou, and of Jeanne Froyer of La Baronnière. His career as a missionary in New France in the 1620s lasted less than five years.

== Arrival in New France ==
Daillon arrived at Quebec from Dieppe on June 19, 1625. He had been asked by his superiors to provide assistance to Father Nicolas Viel, a missionary to the Wendat. He had travelled as far as Trois-Rivières in the company of Jesuit missionary Jean de Brébeuf, when he learned of Father Viel's death. On the advice of their Wendat and French escorts, both men decided to turn back.

A year later Daillon set out again in the company of Brébeuf, and after a successful trip by canoe, arrived at the Wendat village of Toanché, located near present-day Penetanguishene, Ontario.

== Missionary to the Attawandaron ==
In October 1626, Daillon received a letter from his superior, Father Joseph Le Caron, directing him to minister to the Attawandaron, called the Neutral by the French. They were given this name because they did not take sides during the conflicts between the Wendat and Haudenosaunee (Iroquois). The Attawandaron lived south of the Wendat near the head of Lake Ontario, along the Grand River, and in the Niagara Peninsula. In his account of his time among them, Daillon reported that they had 28 villages.

Daillon departed Toanché, headed west into Petun (Tionontati) territory and then travelled south through five Attawandaron villages before reaching Ounontisaston, the village of the Attawandaron's leader Souharissen. Archaeologists have proposed that the Walker Site southeast of Brantford, Ontario was this village. Daillon remained at Ounontisaston for about 3½ months during which time Souharissen personally adopted Daillon as a son.

At Ounontisaston, Daillon encouraged the Attawandaron to trade directly with the French, and sought converts to Catholicism. His time among them, however, ended poorly. The Wendat, unhappy with a French presence among the Attawandaron, spread rumours that Daillon was a sorcerer. Daillon records that he was subsequently beaten and his baggage pillaged by some men from Ouaroronon who had come to trade with the Attawandaron. He noted that the Ouaroronon was a village "one day's journey" from the Haudenosaunee which suggests that Ouaroronon may have been a Wenrohronon village east of the Niagara River. Daillon left Ounontisaston in March 1627 and returned to Toanché.

== Discovery of oil ==
Daillon has been credited with being the first to record a source of petroleum in North America. This claim dates to an 1876 pamphlet titled Early Accounts of Petroleum in the United States. The author, William Buck, stated that Daillon "penetrated into the interior of the present State of New York" and discovered the oil spring located near Cuba in Allegany County. This claim has been uncritically accepted and embellished in later works such as John Herrick's Empire Oil: The Story of Oil in New York State. Herrick asserts that the village where Daillon lived for 3½ months was located near the oil spring, however, it is generally accepted by archaeologists and historians that Souharissen's village was in the Grand River watershed.

The belief that Daillon discovered the oil spring is still cited in recent work about petroleum history. Alberta's Energy Heritage website asserts that:

The first recording of oil in North America occurred in 1627. Souharissen, a chief of the Neutral Indians, led Franciscan Recollect missionary Joseph de la Roche d'Aillon to a spring in what is now up-state New York (near the town of Cuba, New York). The spring was sacred to both the Neutral and the Seneca, who revered its healing properties. Father d'Aillon blessed the spring and wrote about it in his letters.

Daillon's own account fails to support these claims as the word "oil" appears only once in his writing, in the context of the food produced by the Neutral: "They have squashes, beans, and other vegetables in abundance, and very good oil, which they call Touronton." Gabriel Sagard in his Histoire du Canada recorded how the neighbouring Wendat extracted oil from sunflower seeds which suggests that Daillon's "oil" may have been sunflower oil.

== Leaving the Wendat and New France ==
In 1628, Daillon left Toanché and returned to Trois-Rivières with a group of Wendat bringing pelts to trade. From there he journeyed to Quebec, and was ministering there in May 1629. When the French briefly surrendered control of New France to the English in 1629, the Catholic missionaries were forced to leave the province. Daillon was the Latin language interpreter during the capitulation. He left Quebec on September 9, 1629, and died in Paris in 1656.

Daillon wrote an account of his experiences in a letter dated July 18, 1627. His account was reproduced in abridged form by Gabriel Sagard in his Histoire du Canada and Chrétien Le Clercq in his First Establishment of the Faith in New France.

== Legacy ==
De La Roche Hall, the main science building at St. Bonaventure University in Western New York is named after the missionary. Exterior details on the building have a petroleum theme reflecting his alleged discovery.
