= Denis Jamet =

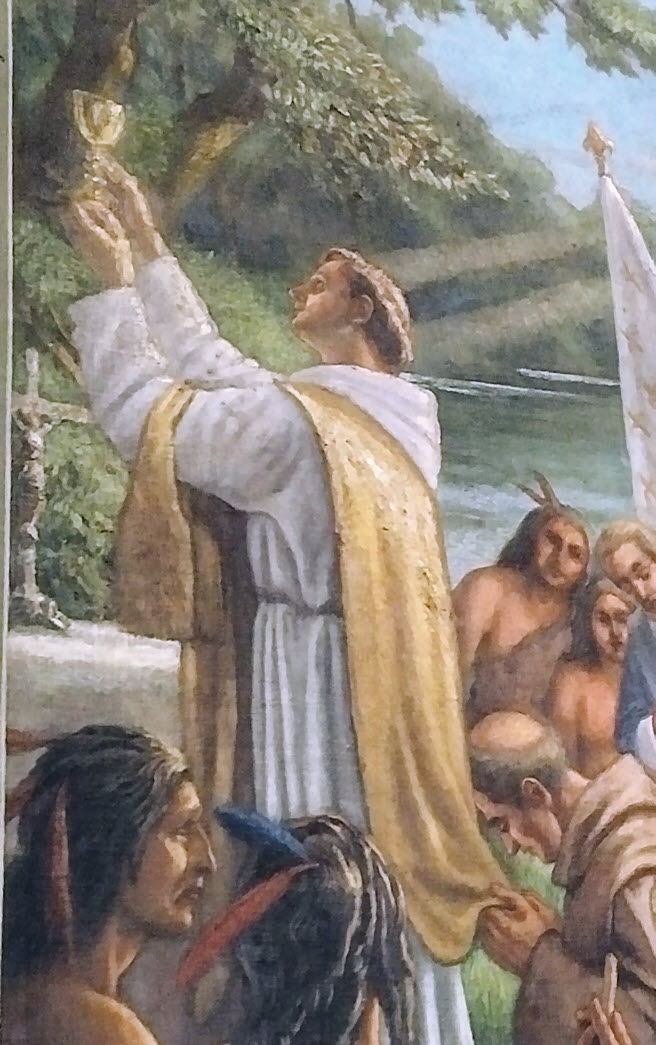
Denis Jamay, 1615.jpg

Denis Jamet, O.M.R., (or Denis Jamay) (died February 26, 1625, in Montargis, France) was a French Recollect friar and Catholic priest and the first superior of the Canadian mission (1615).

Jamet, Provincial Superior of the Order in the Province of Saint-Denis in France, in 1615 was chosen by his superiors as Provincial Commissary and chief of the first band of Recollect friars, who were also the first missionaries of Canada. He sailed from Honfleur on the St. Étienne on April 24, 1615, with three other Recollects, Father Joseph Le Caron, Father Jean Dolbeau and laybrother Brother Pacifique Duplessis. They arrived at Tadoussac on May 25 and Jamet went immediately with Samuel de Champlain to meet the Indians at Sault St. Louis. On June 24, 1615, at Rivière des Prairies, he celebrated the first Mass said in Quebec. He sent back to France a relation dated July 15, 1615 (addressed to Cardinal François de Joyeuse). This relation included some description of the topography, climate, inhabitants, customs and religion of New France, as well as Jamet's views on the conditions necessary for the evangelization of the country.

On July 20, 1616, Jamet left for France with Champlain and Father Le Caron to urge before the king and the Associates of Rouen the material and spiritual interests of the colony. During his four years in France, while still working on behalf of the Canadian missions, he also served as superior of the convents of Saint-Denis (1617), Châlons (1618), and Sézanne, which he founded in 1619.

Again elected commissary provincial, he returned to Canada with Champlain and his wife, sailing on April 5, 1620, on the Sallemande. On reaching Quebec he exhorted the colonists to obey the viceroy and his lieutenant, Champlain. He completed the first regular convent of the Recollects at Quebec, Notre-Dame-des-Anges, with the financial assistance of Charles de Boves, vicar general of Pontoise, Henry II de Bourbon, Prince de Condé, and Sieur Louis Houel. He dedicated the convent on May 25, 1621. Jamet returned to France in the spring of 1622. He died at the friary of Montargis, in Orléanais, on February 26, 1625.

== Bibliography ==
- (in French) Samuel de Champlain, Les Œuvres de Champlain, ed. by Charles-Honoré Laverdière (6 vols., Quebec, 1870)
- (in French) Gabriel Sagard, Histoire du Canada, ed. Tross (4 vols., Paris, 1866)
- (in French) Histoire chronol. de la province de St-Denis (Bibliothèque nationale, Paris)
