= Pierre Brébiette =

French painter and etcher

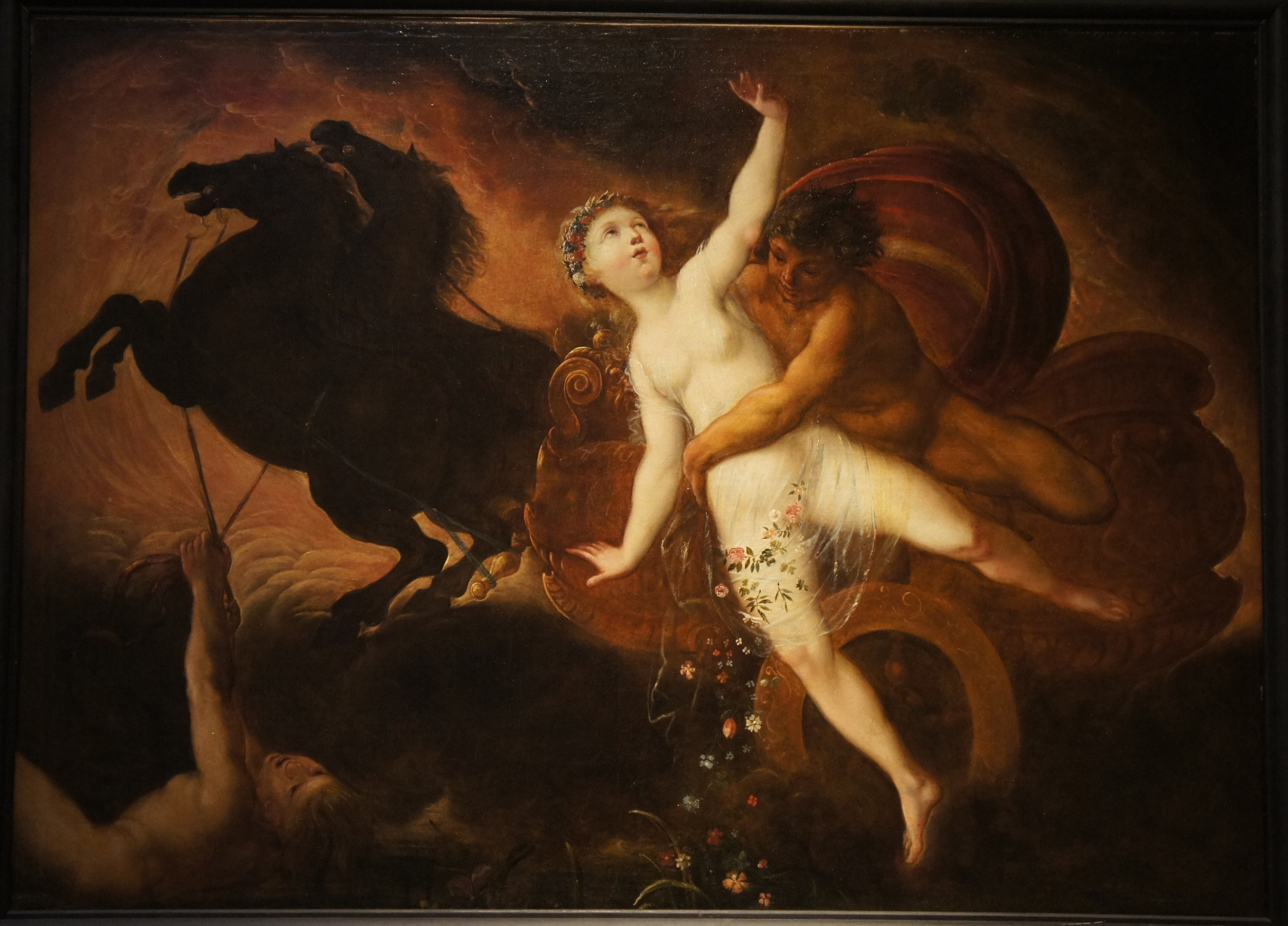
The Rape of Proserpina by Pluto

Pierre Brébiette (1598 ? - 1642) was a French painter and etcher. Brebiette was born in Mantes-sur-Seine and lived and worked in Italy, much of the time in Rome, from 1617 to circa 1625. He and his wife, who died in 1637, had seven children together.

Many of his etchings and some of his drawings have been preserved, but so far only one of his signed paintings has been positively identified and widely accepted as his work. That work, an oil on canvas entitled The Rape of Proserpina by Pluto, is now in the Picot collection within the collections of the Musée des Beaux-Arts et d'Archéologie de Châlons-en-Champagne.

Brebiette's paintings were popular enough in the mid-17th century to inspire at least ten known engravings marked as having been designed based upon his paintings. While some of the themes of Brebiette's works are biblical, based upon the remaining engravings of his paintings by others and etchings by his own hand, he seems to have mainly chosen classical Greco-Roman mythology for his topics.

Paola Bassani Pacht, who published an exhibition catalogue on Pierre Brébiette together with Sylvain Kerspern for the Musée des Beaux Arts d'Orleans in 2001, has attributed a large Neptune Calmant la Tempête as being Brébiette's. This oil on canvas, size 111.7 x 148 cm, was formerly at the Galerie Alexis Bordes in Paris, and is now in a private Paris collection. The painting was discovered by Gui Rochat as French 18th century in Christie's South Kensington April 13, 2011, lot 178.

An unsigned Crucifixion at the église Notre-Dame-en-Vaux in Châlons-en-Champagne is also attributed to Brébiette (classified as a Monument historique in 1907).
