= Nouvelle Relation de la Gaspésie =

Nouvelle Relation de la Gaspésie (English translation: New Relation of Gaspesia), is a documentation of indigenous life in New France, published in Paris in 1691 by the Recollect missionary Chrestien Le Clercq (1641–c. 1700), demonstrating the ways of life of those indigenous communities that he resided with as a result of his missions. Its full title is Nouvelle relation de la Gaspésie, qui contient les moeurs & la religion des sauvages Gaspesiens porte-croix, adorateurs du soleil, & d'autres peuples de l'Amérique septentrionale, dite le Canada (roughly translated: A New Account of Gaspé, which contains the customs and religion of the Gaspesian savages, bearers of the cross, worshippers of the sun, and of other peoples of northern America, called Canada).

== Content ==
His work describes the culture, religion, language, and customs of the Mi'kmaq people of the Gaspé Peninsula in New France. Le Clercq was the first to use the terms “Gaspésie” and “Gaspésiens” for the region and its inhabitants. The book also includes a hieroglyphic system for teaching the catechism and a dictionary intended for future missionaries.

== Publication and reception ==
Le Clercq spent about twelve years among the Mi'kmaq. After his return to France, he completed two works which he published at Paris in 1691. An English translation of Nouvelle Relation de la Gaspésie was provided by William F. Ganong in 1910 as part of the Champlain Society's General Series.

The work is considered one of the most authentic and important sources on the early history of Canada.

== Editions ==
- Nouvelle relation de la Gaspésie, qui contient Les Moeurs & la Religion des Sauvages Gaspesiens Porte-Croix, adorateurs du Soleil, & d’autres Peuples de l'Amérique Septentrionale, dite le Canada. Dédiée à Madame la Princesse d'Epinoy, par le Père Chrestien Le Clercq, Missionnaire Recollet de la Province de Saint Antoine de Pade en Artois, & Gardien du Couvent de Lens. Amable Auroy, Paris 1691
- Leclercq, Chrestien (1999). Nouvelle relation de la Gaspésie. Montréal: Les Presses de l'Université de Montréal.

English translation:

- Le Clercq, Father Chrestien (2013). Ganong, William (ed.). New Relation of Gaspesia, with the Customs and Religion of the Gaspesian Indians: The Publications of the Champlain Society. doi:10.3138/9781442618213. ISBN 978-1-4426-1821-3.

== Bibliography ==
- Dumas, G.M. "Chrestien Leclercq". Dictionary of Canadian Biography.
- Brunet, III, 916
- Sabin, 39649
