= Sébastien Leclerc =

French painter

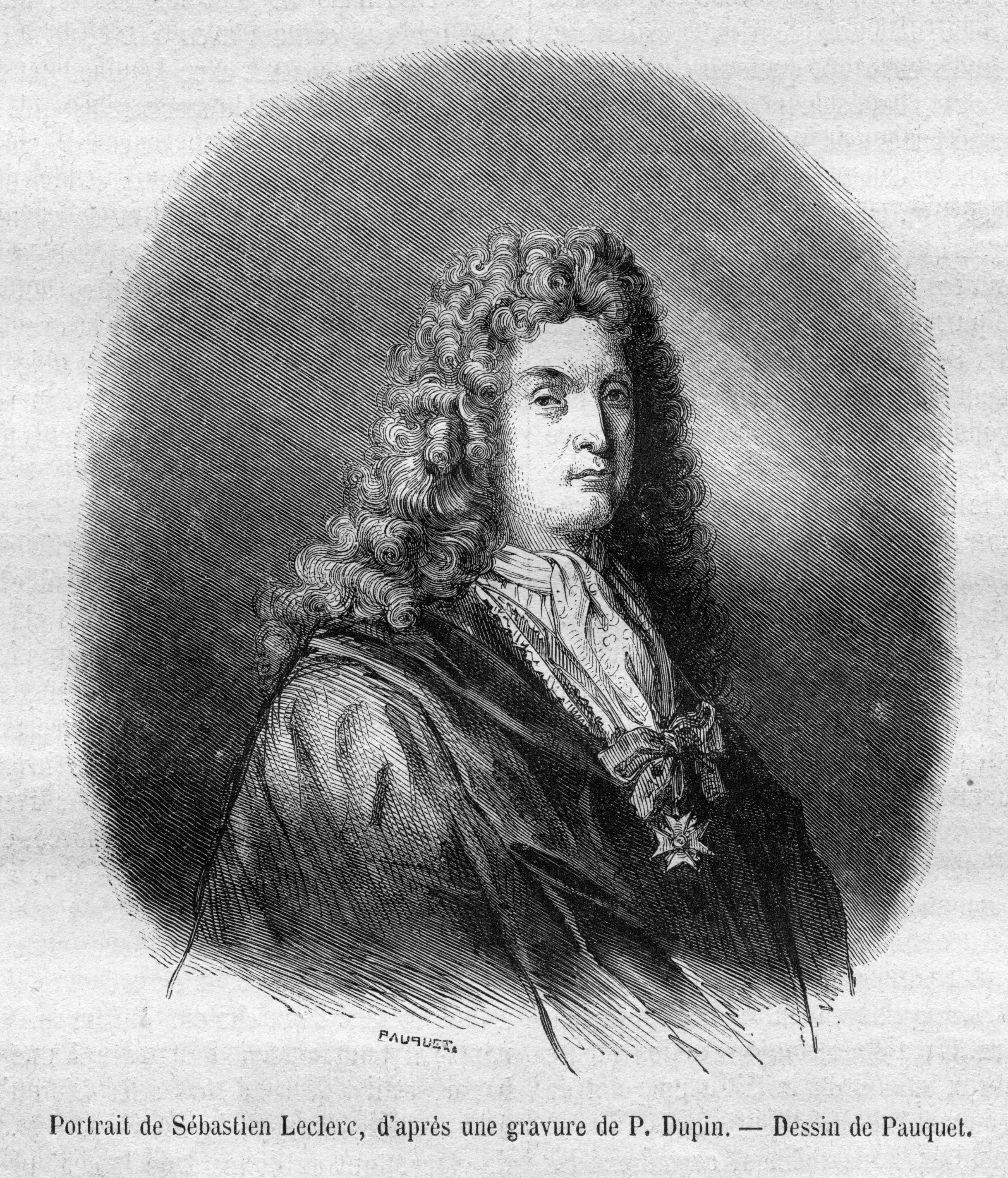
- Drawing of Leclerc by Pauquet after an engraving by P. Dupin.
- Born: September 1637 (baptised 26 September); Metz
- Died: 2 October 1714 (aged 77); Paris
- Known for: Drawing, engraving

Sébastien Leclerc or Le Clerc ([baptized] 26 September 1637— 25 October 1714) was an artist from the French province of the Three Bishoprics. He specialized in subtle reproductive drawings, etchings, and engravings of paintings; and worked mostly in Paris, where he was counseled by the King's painter, Charles Le Brun, to devote himself entirely to engraving. Leclerc joined the Académie Royale de Peinture et de Sculpture in 1672 and taught perspective there. He worked for Louis XIV, being made "graveur du Roi" (attached to the Cabinet du Roi), doing engraving work for the royal house. Leclerc also engaged in periodic work as a technical draftsman and military engineer.

Of his reproductive engravings, the connoisseur and chronicler of artistic life, Pierre-Jean Mariette, wrote in his Abecedario:

"If there has ever been an engraver who rendered himself celebrated in his profession, and who extended his capabilities beyond ordinary bounds, that is, without fear of contradiction: Sébastien Le Clerc".

== Early life ==
Sébastien Leclerc was born in 1637 in Metz; the son of Laurent Leclerc (1590–1695), a local goldsmith and merchant, who taught his son the rudiments of his trade. His first artistic efforts were favorably received in his birthplace, where he engraved a city view in 1650; four screens in 1654; and the "Life of Saint Benedict in 38 scenes" in 1658. Le Clerc went to Paris in 1665, where he pursued a continuing interest in geometry.

Leclerc's illustrated Géométrie Pratique was published in Paris in 1668. He was also a student of physics; military architecture; and perspective; while he supported himself by providing illustrations for authors and booksellers.

=== Marriage and children ===
In 1673 Leclerc married one of the daughters of a royal dyer named Vandenkerchoven. Leclerc and his wife had six sons and four daughters. One of these, Sébastien "the Younger" (1676–1763), gained a reputation in painting.

== Career ==
Leclerc became engineer-geographer to Marshal de la Ferté. During this time, he executed plans of several fortresses in the Metz area. However, when he heard that the king had passed off one of his drawing's as another artist's work, he was unable to bear the affront and quit his job. Wishing to perfect his skills in military engineering, Leclerc moved to Paris (about 1665), where he could better study the subject. He carried letters of recommendation to the painter, Charles Le Brun. Upon seeing a sample of Leclerc's engravings, Le Brun advised him to abandon the sciences and devote himself solely to drawing and engraving under his tutelage. As the protégé of such a major artist, Leclerc had no trouble gaining commissions. Booksellers were eager to have his engravings decorate their books. His reputation rose quickly.

=== Sponsored ===
A sponsor, Jean-Baptiste Colbert, stepped forward and put him up at the Gobelins Manufactory on a pension of 600 écus, with the express condition that he use his talents only in the king's service. (Colbert had designated one of his sons (later the Marquis de Blainville) to replace him as superintendant des bâtiments—Leclerc gave this young man drawing lessons and instruction.)

In 1672, Chancellor Pierre Séguier died. Le Brun was chosen to design his catafalque. He gave Leclerc the task of doing the engravings. He was so pleased with Leclerc's work that he put both Leclerc and his work before the voters of the Académie Royale de Peinture et de Sculpture, who accepted him unanimously on 16 August 1672. In recognition of his previous studies, he was also made the académie's professor of geometry and perspective. At this point, Leclerc could consider his fortune made.

While at Goeblins, Leclerc worked in straitened circumstances due to his pension (now at 1800 livres) and the condition he only work for the king. With his family expanding and his reputation rising, he eventually abandoned this pension and regained his artistic freedom. Thereafter, he worked on a considerable number of engravings. Religious books and contemporary novels teemed with his engravings.

In 1684, Leclerc engraved a plate notable in art history. While Le Brun headed the Gobelins factory, there was a custom of putting up a maypole in his honor every May. Leclerc engraved a scene of this ceremony, in which one panel showed the moment at which the tall tree was dressed with emblems flattering Le Brun, and, a second panel, below, showed the festivities accompanying the occasion.

=== Royal appointments and other honors ===
Leclerc was appointed engraver to Louis XIV. He was granted the honorific cavaliere Romano by the Pope in 1706.

In 1710 Leclerc feared losing his sight and was for a while forced to give up his work, though he returned to it, if only for a few years. He died in Paris in 1714 while still putting the finishing touches to his Traité d’Architecture.

== Analysis ==
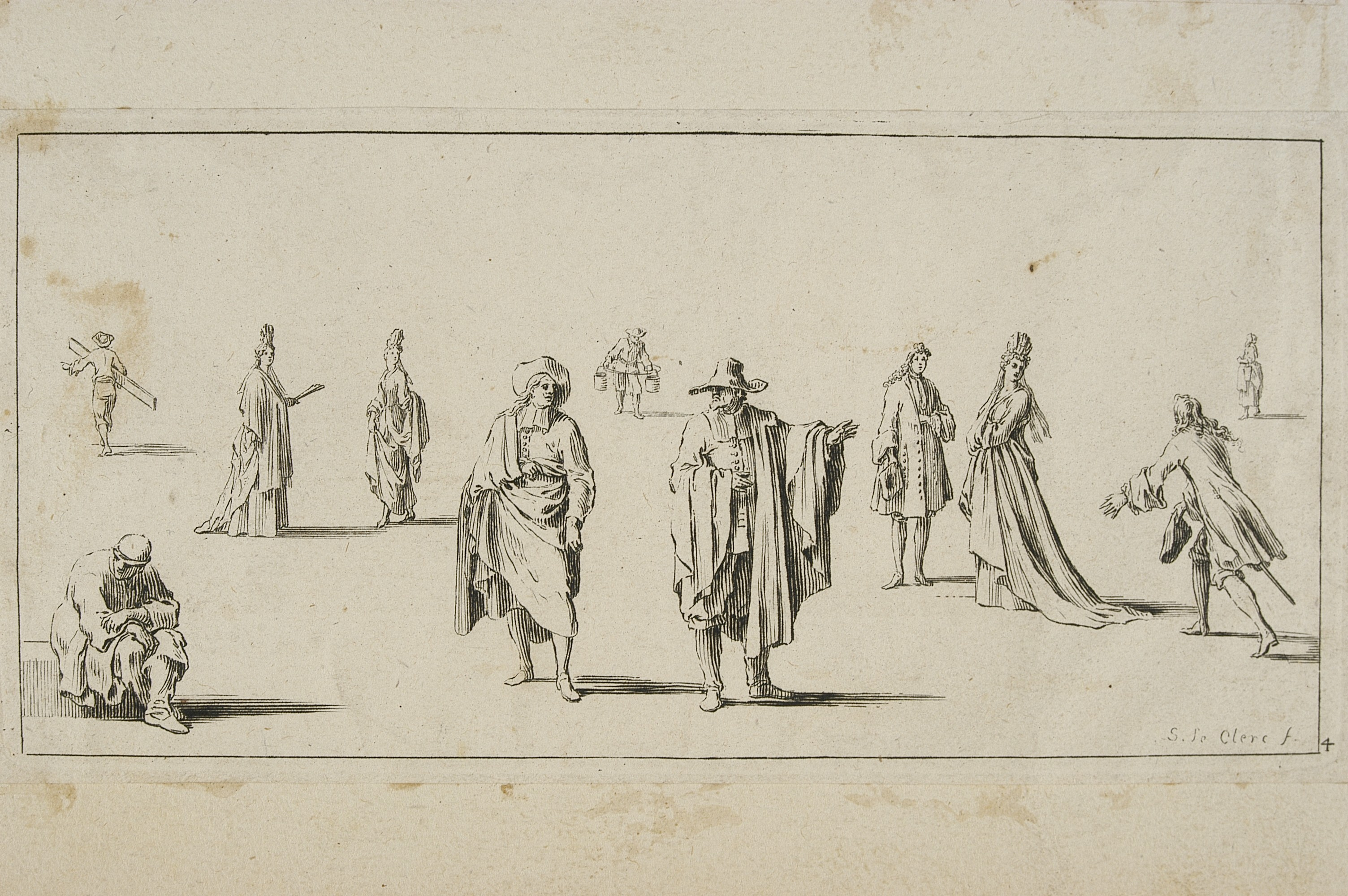
(Diverses suites de figures, livre 1). 4

For his talent at composition, Leclerc is accounted among the best French artists of the 17th century. His catalog was edited by Th.-Ant. Joubert and contains 3412 pieces—nearly all his own composition. He is credited with a remarkable intelligence; a delicacy in engraving the smallest drawings; and a certain grandeur in his treatment of the most grand and lavish subjects. Leclerc has sometimes been criticized for some monotony and for inconsistencies in plates destined for the same book—although such a wide output made some repetition inevitable. Leclerc is held as one of the most able French engravers, alongside Callot, Abraham Bosse and Brebiette.

His richly illustrated treatise on architecture (Paris, 1714) was translated into English by Ephraim Chambers as A treatise of Architecture with Remarks and Observations. In a number of editions, it served until the mid-eighteenth century as the only systematized and encyclopedic introduction to the decorative part of architecture, ornamentation and enriched molding that was available in English.

== Legacy ==
Two early sources on Leclerc are the Éloge, by Abbé Vallemant (Paris, 1715)—full of sentimental fabrications; and the Catalogue de l'Oeuvre de Le Clerc, by Charles-Antoine Jombert (Paris, 1774). Edward Meaume published a catalogue raisonné, Sébastien Le Clerc et son Oeuvre; Paris; 1877. An exhibition of his work was mounted by the Bibliothèque municipale de Metz, 27 May-26 July 1980.

== Notable works ==
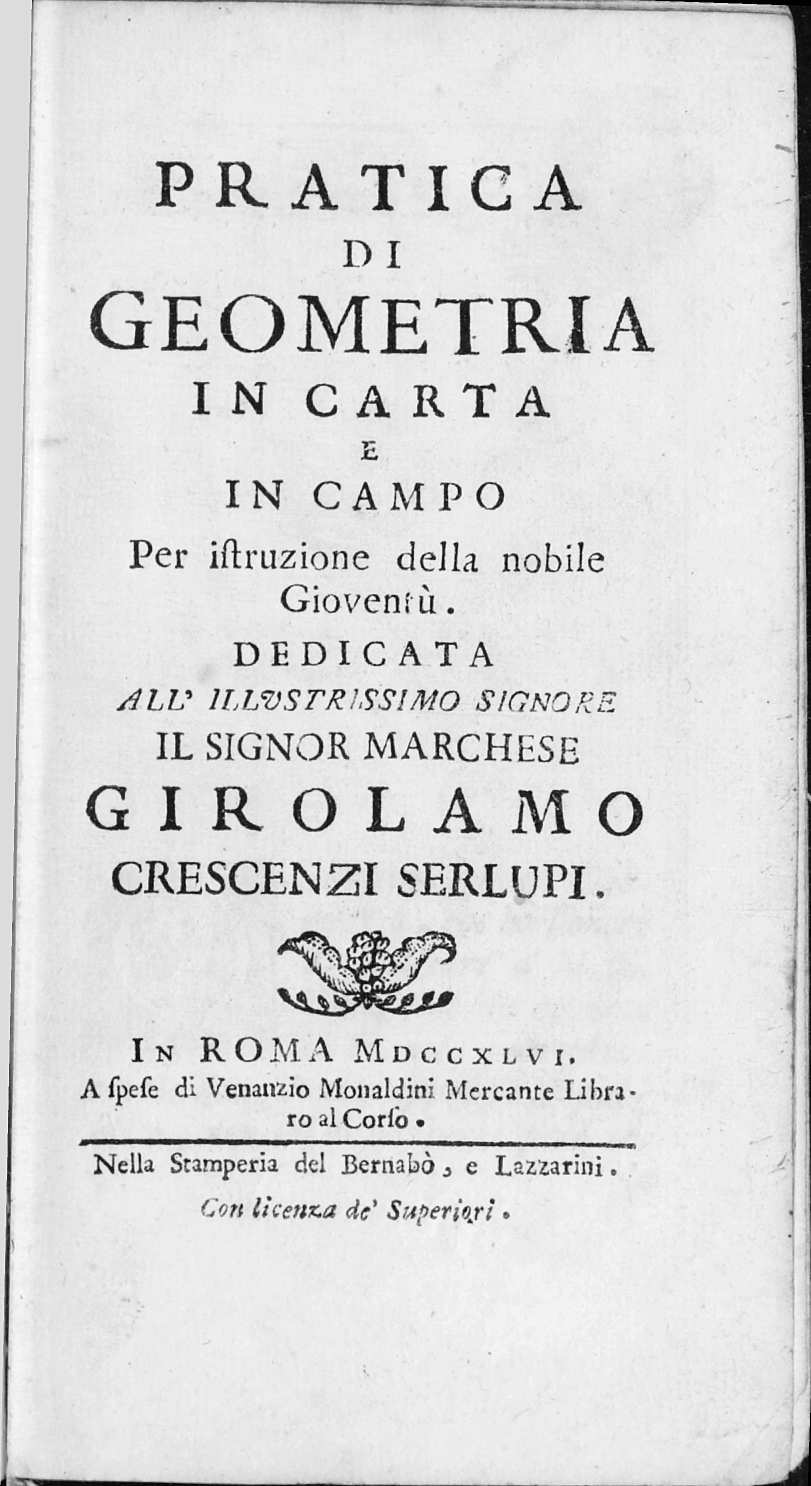
Pratica di geometria in carta e in campo per istruzione della nobile gioventù, 1746

- Pratique de la Géométrie sur le papier et sur le terrain, Paris, Thomas Jolly, 1669;
- Nouveau système du monde conforme à l’écriture sainte, Paris, Giffard, 1706;
- Nouveau Système du Monde, conforme a l'Ecriture Sainte (in French). Paris: Pierre Giffart. 1706.
- Système de la vision fondé sur de nouveaux principes, Paris, Florentin Delaulne, 1712;
- Traité d'architecture avec des remarques et des observations très utiles pour les jeunes gens, qui veulent s'appliquer à ce bel art, Paris, Giffard, 1714.

== Sources ==
- Gallay, Antoine (2026). Sébastien Le Clerc (1637-1714). Art et science à l'aube des Lumières. Geneva: Droz. ISBN 978-2-600-06719-5.
- Maxime Préaud, Inventaire du fonds français : graveurs du XVIIe siècle. T. 8-9 : Sébastien Leclerc, Paris : Bibliothèque nationale, 1980.
