= Joseph Le Caron =

French Recollect missionary to the Wendat

Joseph Le Caron, O.M.R., (c. 1586 near Paris – March 29, 1632 in Gisors, France) was one of the four pioneer missionaries of Canada (together with Denis Jamet, Jean Dolbeau, and Pacifique du Plessis, all Recollect friars), and was the first missionary to the Hurons.

Born around 1586, Le Caron took Holy Orders and served as chaplain and tutor to the Duke of Orléans, the future King Henry IV of France, and his son the Dauphin (later Louis XIII). When the King died, Le Caron renounced any ecclesiastical advancement and joined the Recollects, a reform branch of the Order of Friars Minor who followed a strict life of poverty, with whom he made his profession in 1611.

== Evangelization in New France ==
In 1615, Samuel de Champlain brought four Recollect friars to New France, including Le Caron, as missionaries to the Indians. On April 24, 1615, they sailed from Honfleur aboard the St. Étienne. Le Caron reached Canada on May 25 and immediately accompanied some fur-traders to Sault St. Louis. His intention was to meet the Huron traders there and go with them to their own country. After a short time he travelled to Quebec to provide himself with a portable altar kit. On June 24, 1615, he assisted Denis Jamet in saying the first Mass in Quebec, on the Île de Montréal.

Le Caron returned to the Sault, and went into the land of the Hurons, being the first to visit their settlements and preach the Gospel, preceding even Champlain. His party made the 1,100-km voyage following the Ottawa River as far as the Mattawa, the Mattawa as far as Lake Nipissing, and then the French River to Georgian Bay. He thus became one of the first Europeans to see Lake Huron, which he reached by the end of July, a few days before Champlain also arrived. On August 12, 1615, he celebrated the first Mass in Huron country, in the presence of Champlain. Le Caron stayed with the Hurons about a year (1615–16), and was again among them in 1623. In 1623, he was accompanied by Nicolas Viel, who would contribute significantly to Le Caron's dictionary and Gabriel Sagard.

In 1616, Le Caron returned to France with Champlain, to look after the spiritual and material interests of the colony. The following spring saw him in Canada again, as Provincial Commissary. During this time he celebrated the wedding of Louis Hébert’s eldest daughter Anne to Étienne Jonquet, the first recorded Christian marriage in Canada.

During the winters of 1618 and 1622 he evangelized the Montagnais of Tadousac. He also taught them reading and writing. Back with the Hurons in 1623 he would have lost his life, but for the protection of a powerful Huron chief. In 1625, he was once more in France. He returned to Canada a year later, was again appointed Commissary for the friars in Quebec, and filled this office until the capture of Quebec by the English in 1629, when he and his colleagues were sent back to France by the conquerors. He arrived back in France on October 29, 1629.

Le Caron was a saintly man, given to the practice of austerities, but gentle towards others. He died of the plague in the friary of Sainte-Marguerite near Gisors, in Upper Normandy, where he served as guardian. The Collège Édouard-Montpetit in Longueuil, Quebec has a pavilion named in his honor. There is a French high school named after him in the community of Penetanguishene on Georgian Bay, in Ontario.

== Writings ==
Le Caron compiled the first dictionary of the Huron language, and also dictionaries of the Algonkin and Montagnais languages. None are extant today. In June 1624, he sent to France a study of the Indians, their customs, and the difficulties involved in their conversion. Large extracts of the document were preserved by Le Clercq. The introduction refers to a second memoir, the manuscript of which is now lost. He wrote two indictments to the king of the Compagnie des Marchands de Rouen et de Saint-Malo, which the Recollects believed were hindering the evangelization of the Indians.

The Bibliotheca Universa Franciscana of Jean de S. Antoine, II (Madrid, 1732), 243, says on the evidence of Arthur of Rouen in his Martyrologium Franciscanum under date of 31 August, that Le Caron wrote also a Latin Quærimonia Novæ Franciæ (Complaint of New France).

== Bibliography ==
- (in French) Histoire chronol. de la province de St-Denis (Bibliothèque nationale, Paris)
- (in French) Mortuologe des Récollets de la province de St-Denis (late seventeenth-century MS., in the archives of Quebec seminary)
- (in French) Samuel de Champlain, Les Œuvres de Champlain, ed. by Charles-Honoré Laverdière (6 vols., Quebec, 1870)
- (in French) Gabriel Sagard, Histoire du Canada, ed. Tross (4 vols., Paris, 1866)
- (in French) Le Clercq, Premier Etablissment de la Foi dans la Nouvelle France (2 vols., Paris, 1691).
- (in French) Sixte Le Tac, Histoire chronologique de la Nouvelle-France ou Canada depuis sa découverte (mil cinq cents quatre) jusques en l’an mil six cents trente deux, ed. Eugène Réveillaud (Paris, 1888).
