= Notre-Dame-de-la-Visitation Church (Champlain, Quebec) =

Catholic church in Champlain, Quebec, Canada

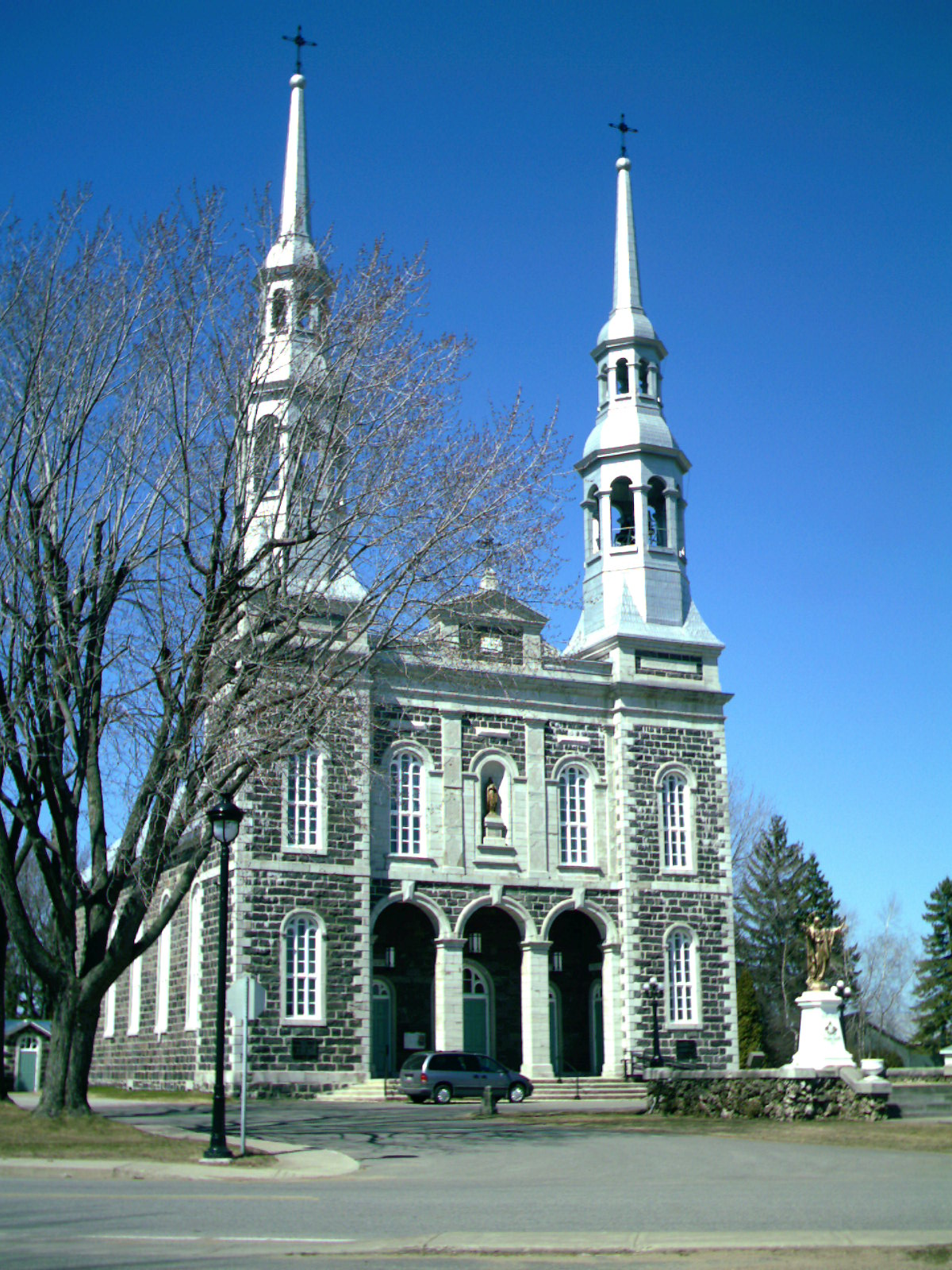
The church

Notre-Dame-de-la-Visitation (Our Lady of the Visitation) is a neo-Romanesque Catholic church on Chemin du Roy in Champlain, Mauricie, Quebec.

== History ==
The church was built in 1878-1879 by the Princeville architect and entrepreneur Gédéon Leblanc (1832-1905). Its first service was held on 9 October 1879. It is 42 by 20.4 metres (138 by 67 feet) and its vault is 16 m (52 ft) high, while the bell towers are 53.6 m (176 ft) high. Its exterior was inspired by Saint-Stanislas, parish church of the neighbouring parish. The interior was completed in 1881 to designs by the architect Jean-Baptiste Bourgeois, known as Louis-Joseph Bourgeois (1856-1930), then aged 25. This was then totally covered in trompe-l’œil frescoes by François-Xavier-Édouard Meloche in 1882–1883, his first major work.

The parish was founded in 1664 and had three previous church buildings, whose fittings are now in the present church, including the oldest paintings in Quebec (dating to before 1687), the oldest wooden sanctuary lamp in Quebec (before 1687), the oldest sculpture (pre-1687), the oldest engraving (late 17th century) and works by major painters such as Claude François (1687), Noël-Nicolas Coypel (1714), William Berczy (1810), François Normand (1813) and Louis-Philippe Hébert (1882).

Since 1998, the church has been open to the public under the stewardship of the ‘Committee for the conservation and restoration of the church of Champlain’.

== See also ==
- Catholic Church in Canada

== External links (in French) ==
- Église de Champlain, site officiel
- Inventaire des lieux de culte du Québec - Champlain
- Municipalité de Champlain, site officiel
