= Henry Percival Biggar =

Canadian historian

Henry Percival Biggar (Carrying Place, Ontario, August 9, 1872 — Worplesdon, Surrey, July 25, 1938) was a historian and Canadian archivist. After studies at the Upper Canada College of Toronto, at the University of Toronto and at the University of Oxford, he worked with Archives nationales du Canada and became chief archivist of Canada in Europe from 1905 until his death.

== Works ==
Expert in the history of New France, he wrote The Early Trading Companies of New France (1901), co-edited the first book published by the Champlain Society, Lescarbot’s History of New France (1907), published The Precursors of Jacques Cartier (1911) as well as A Collection of Documents relating to Jacques Cartier and the Sieur de Roberval (1930). He also translated and published The Voyages of Jacques Cartier (1924) and supervised the publication of The Works of Samuel de Champlain (1922–1936).
