= Champlain Society =

Canadian text publication society

The Champlain Society seeks to advance knowledge of Canadian history through the publication of scholarly books (both digital and print) of primary records of voyages, travels, correspondence, diaries and governmental documents and memoranda. The Society is named after Samuel de Champlain (1574–1635), the explorer, founder of New France and author of numerous exploratory narratives. The Society is a registered, not-for-profit charity administered by a voluntary and unpaid team of council members and officers. It was chartered in Ontario in 1927. Membership is open to all who have an interest in Canadian history. It is based in Toronto, Ontario.

== Foundation ==
The Champlain Society was created following a lecture to the Canadian Club in Toronto in March 1905 on "History and Patriotism" given by Charles W. Colby, chair of the Department of History at McGill University. Colby had hailed the various societies in the United Kingdom and the United States dedicated to reprinting key documents of history and argued that Canada should have such an organization.

The speech prompted Sir Edmund Walker (1848–1924), liberal thinker, philanthropist and president of the Canadian Bank of Commerce, into action. A frail constitution prevented Walker from pursuing a teaching career, so instead he entered the business world at the age of twelve years. After hearing the speech, he contacted George Wrong, head of the University of Toronto's Department of History, and Dr. James Bain, chief librarian of the Toronto Public Library, and within days The Champlain Society was established as a non-profit organization that would function as a subscription publisher. The idea was to collect 500 members (half individuals and half libraries) that would each contribute $10 and receive two books per year. Prime Minister Wilfrid Laurier became a member. Professor George Wrong and the publications committee drew up a list of potential publications. By the close of 2005, the Society had published 101 books and was the oldest society of its kind in Canada. The translators’ quarrels over translation, interpretation, and style advanced as the project did, especially with the chief editor, Henry Percival Biggar. "Rather than leaving Champlain’s ambiguities, an effort was made to guess what he was trying to say, and rather than leaving his 'laboured pedestrian style,' an effort was made to make it more intelligible to a modern reader."

== History ==
The initial book, the first volume of Lescarbot's History of New France, edited by W. L. Grant and Henry Percival Biggar, was published in 1907, and within a decade the Society published ten books. Walker remained president until his death in 1924. He was succeeded by a series of scholars, but on occasion the Society has been led by non-academics.

The Society's focus was to publish scholarly editions of primary sources on exploratory voyages undertaken by individuals in Canada. Since then, its interests have broadened to include collections of letters on science, foreign policy, political affairs, governors general, aspects of business history and the history of communities. These include early accounts dealing with the geography, ethnology and natural history of Canadian regions. The Society has published over 100 volumes. All the works have been published in English, but some include original French texts.

Successive Champlain Society editions have featured the works of the following explorers: Samuel de Champlain, Marc Lescarbot, Nicolas Denys, Chretien Le Clercq, Samuel Hearne, John Knox, David Thompson, Pierre Gualtier de Varennes de la Verendrye, John McLean, Francois du Creux, Gabriel Sagard, Sieur de Dièreville, Sir Hovenden Walker, Alexander Begg, Alexander Henry, John Palliser, John Franklin, Gabriel Franchere and Pierre-Esprit Radisson. Many works have examined aspects of Indigenous life, including books by Father Joseph Francois Lafiteau and John Norton.

All editions contain a scholarly apparatus that provides both the general reader and the student with a context to the material presented, and offers guidance on the relevance of the material within Canadian affairs. Volumes have, since the beginning, been produced in signature red binding, with embossed crest, and typically feature maps and contemporary illustrations.

== Other activities ==
The Champlain Society holds its annual general meeting in October at the Archives of the City of Toronto. It also publishes "Findings/Trouvailles", a monthly bulletin on particularly interesting archival finds uncovered by members of the society. The Society also produces "Witness to Yesterday: Explorations into Canada’s Past," a series of podcasts recorded in the Allan Slaight Radio Institute at Ryerson University by students in the Department of Radio & Television Arts. They are partially sponsored by the L. R. Wilson Institute for Canadian History at McMaster University.

Supplementary to its primary role as a publisher, the Society also advances its aims by organizing and participating in meetings, symposia and conferences that contribute to an increased awareness of Canada's documentary history. Currently, one volume is published annually. The Society's website hosts a digital version of all its publications, available in full-text to members.

The Society also administers the Floyd S. Chalmers Award for Ontario History. Created through an endowment from Floyd Sherman Chalmers, it is awarded annually to the best book written on any aspect of Ontario history in the preceding calendar year.

== Presidents ==
Sir Edmund Walker, 1905–24; George M. Wrong, 1924–27; J. B. Tyrrell, 1927–32; Eric Armour, 1932–34; H. H. Langton, 1934–36; Sir Robert Falconer, 1936–42; Judge Frederick W. Howay, 1942–43; W. S. Wallace, 1943–48; Harold C. Walker, 1948–53; W. Kaye Lamb, 1953–64; John M. Gray, 1964–69; W. L. Morton, 1969–74; John Warkentin, 1974–79; R. Murray Bell, 1979–84; Peter S. Osler, 1984–88; Frederick H. Armstrong, 1988–91; Gerald Killan, 1991–94; Ian E. Wilson, 1994–2004; Michael B. Moir, 2004–10; Patrice A. Dutil, 2010–18; Michel S. Beaulieu, 2018-2023; Lawrence Ostola, 2023-
