= Claude Simpol =

French painter

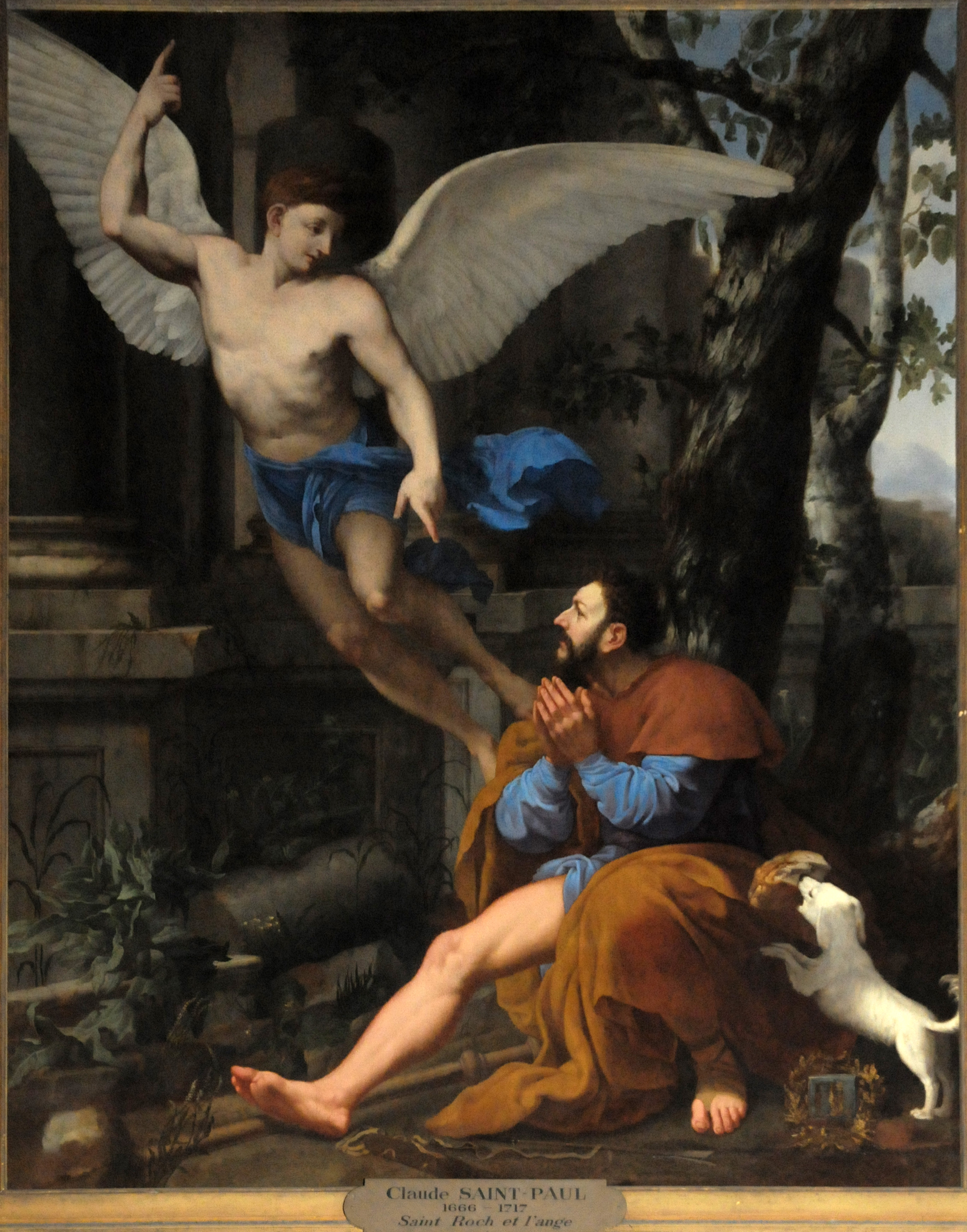
Simpol, Saint Roch and the Angel, église Saint-Nicolas-des-Champs, Paris.

Claude Simpol, Claude Saint-Pol or Claude Saint-Paul (c. 1666 – before 1711) was a French painter.

== Life ==
Born in Clamecy, he studied under Boullogne and frère Luc. He was admitted to the Académie de Saint-Luc on 23 March 1695 and won several prizes (including the second prize in the 1687 prix de Rome for Noah's Flood) at the Académie royale, to which he was admitted on 30 April 1701. Specialising in grisailles, he was listed on 2 March 1709 as still not having provided his academy work, whose subject was Neptune's Dispute with Minerva, or the Naming of the City of Athens.

He was described by Pierre-Jean Mariette as an artist who had "little love for work" and who adopted "bad conduct, which continually forced him to struggle with need:. Even so, he produced paintings for the menagerie at the Palace of Versailles in 1702 and 1703 and produced a May for Notre-Dame in Paris in 1704 (Jesus in the House of Martha and Mary, now in the Musée des beaux-arts d'Arras).

He also produced several drawings to be engraved and a teaching model for a polisher in Paris. He also worked for the publisher Jean Mariette, who commissioned fashion plates, pastoral scenes and religious images from him. These include a set of twelve scenes of rural subject matter, once thought to be by Jacques Stella, representing the months, and a number of illustrations for Les Vies des SS. Pères des déserts d’Orient published in 1711. He died in Paris.

== Drawings ==
- (in French) Preparatory design by him, acquired by the Bibliothèque nationale de France in 2012.
- Drawings by him acquired in 2012 by the Musée des Beaux-arts de Rennes : Our Lady of Storms and Masquerade scene.
- Drawings by him in the Metropolitan Museum of Art de New York.
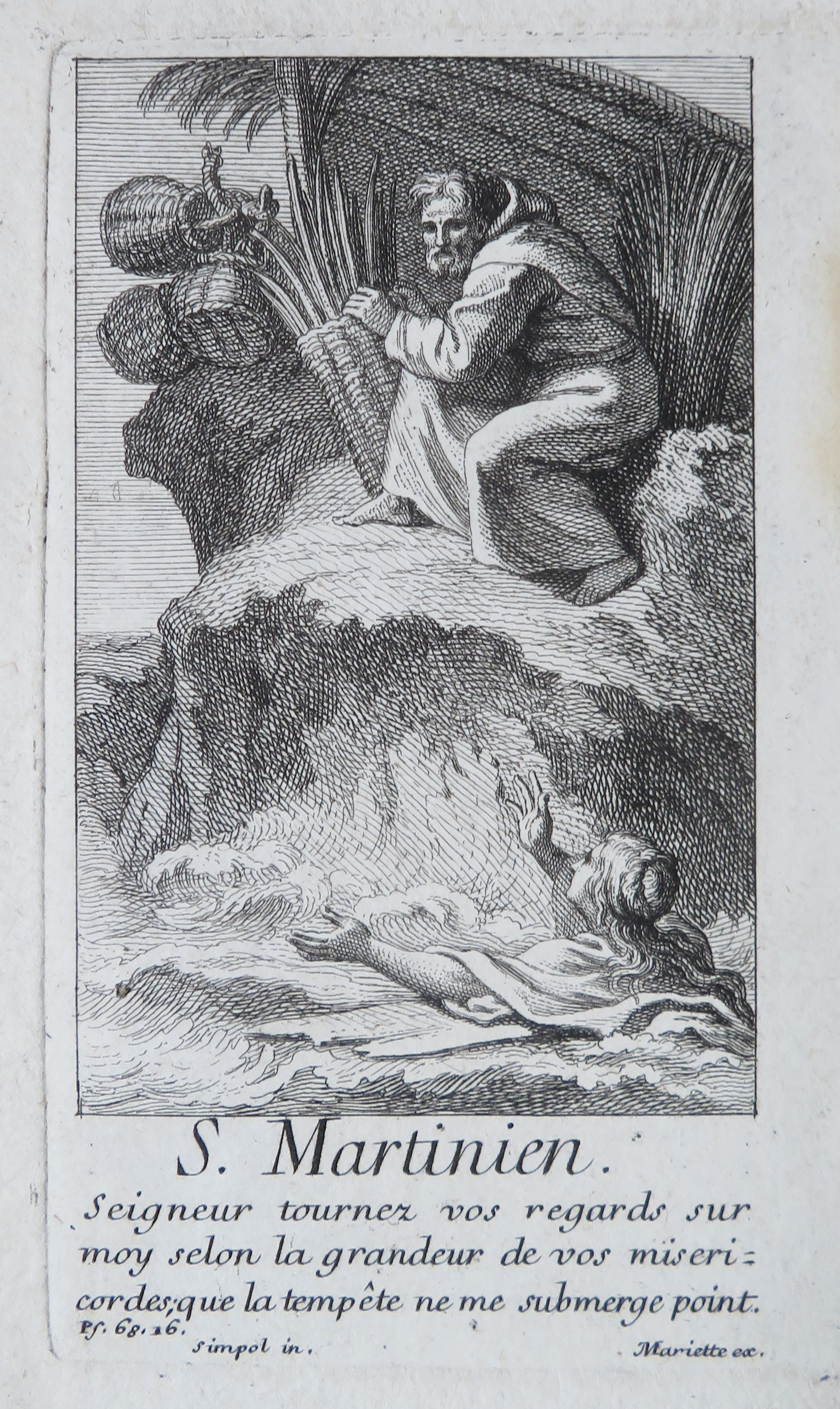
- Jean Mariette after Claude Simpol, Saint Martinien. Etching, 14.5 x 10.8 cm. Jamie Mulherron, Lyon
  Drawings by him in the Fogg Art Museum, Harvard.
- Drawings by him in the British Museum.

== Sources ==
- (in French) Charles-Philippe de Chennevières-Pointel, Archives de l’art français, volume 1, Paris, Dumoulin, 1852, p. 400.
