= Recollects =

French reform branch of the Order of Friars Minor

The Franciscan Recollects (French: Récollets) were a French reform branch of the Friars Minor, a Franciscan order. Denoted by their gray habits and pointed hoods, the Recollects devoted their lives to an extra emphasis on prayer, penance, and spiritual reflection (recollection), focusing on living in small, remote communities to better facilitate these goals. Today they are best known for their activities as missionaries in various parts of the world, most notably in early French Canada.

This branch of the Order had its origins in the 16th century. Officially named the "Order of Friars Minor Recollect", they used the post-nominal initials O.F.M. Rec. (Latin: Ordo fratrum minorum recollectorum) or O.M.R. (Ordo minorum recollectorum). In 1897 Pope Leo XIII dissolved the Recollect branch and merged it, along with several other reform branches of the Order, into the Observant Friars Minor.

== Etymology ==
In Latin Ordo fratrum minorum recollectorum, this last word is the genitive form of recollecti (sg.: recollectus, a participle of recolligere, ‘to gather’). The word is related to the French words recueilli (‘contemplative, meditative’) and recueillement ("gathering one's thought in contemplation, meditation").

The origin of the name "Recollects" is still debated. Some historians attribute it to the recollection houses (retreats). Others credit it to the orders’ practice of accepting only those who possessed the ability of recollection.

== France ==
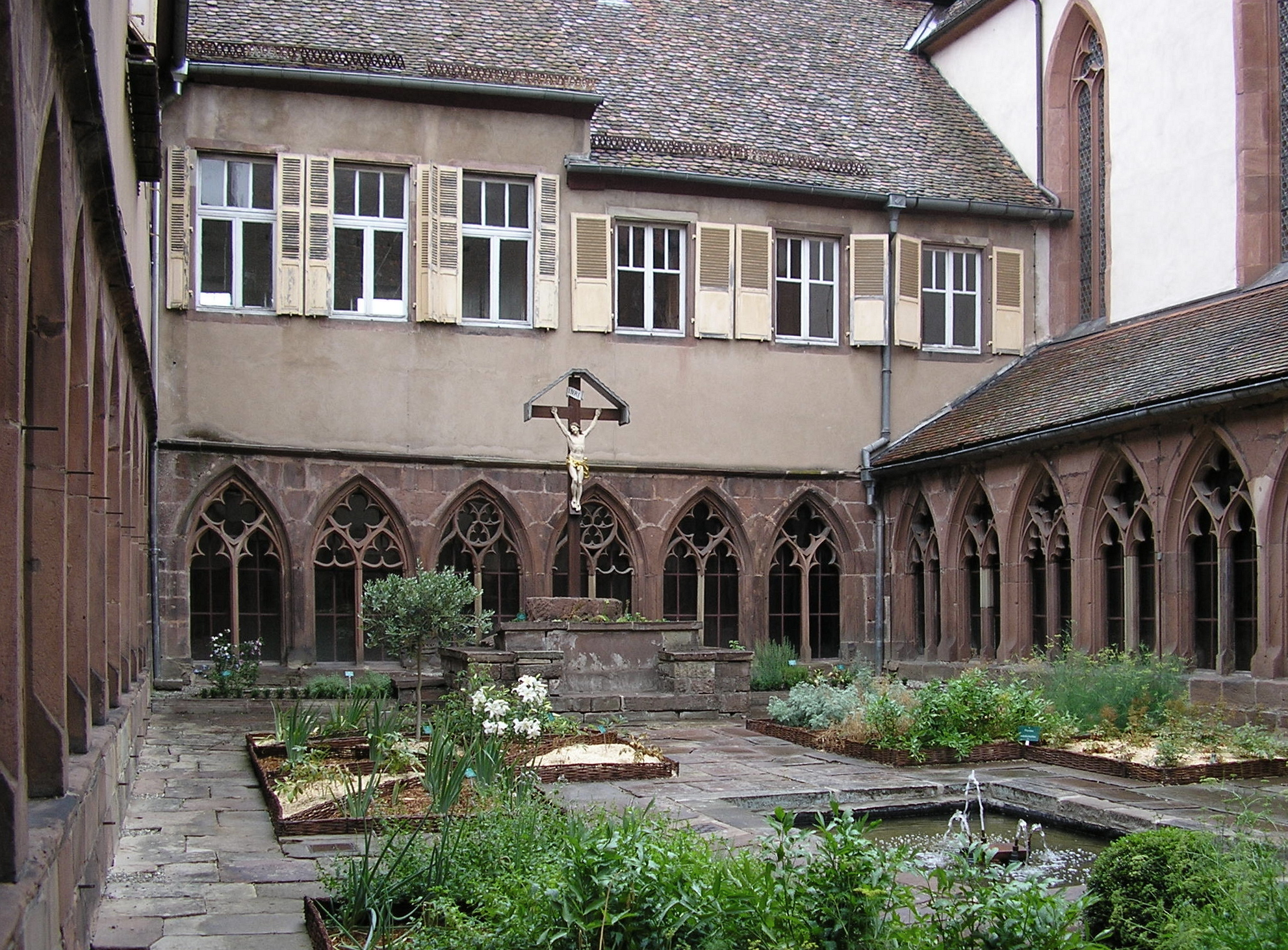
Former Recollect friary in Saverne, Alsace, France

The Recollect branch of the Friars Minor developed out of a reform movement of the Order which began in 16th-century Spain under figures such as Peter of Alcantara, where the followers of the reform were known as Alcantarines. It was observed by communities of friars in France in Tulle in 1585, at Nevers in 1592, at Limoges in 1596 and in Paris at Couvent des Récollets in 1603. The distinctive character of Recollection houses was that they were friaries to which brothers desirous of devoting themselves to prayer and penance could withdraw to consecrate their lives to spiritual reflection. At the same time, they were also active in many pastoral ministries, becoming especially known as military chaplains to the French army.

The French Recollects had 11 provinces, with 2,534 friaries by the late 18th century. The branch was suppressed during the French Revolution.

== In New France ==
=== Canada ===
The Recollects were important as early missionaries to the French colonies in Canada, although they were later displaced by the Jesuits. When Samuel de Champlain returned from his sixth voyage to Canada on 26 May 1613, he made plans to bring missionaries on his next voyage. Champlain had initially turned to the Recollects after receiving advice from his friend Sieur Louis Houel, Secretary to King Louis XIII and controller-general of the salt works at Hiers-Brouage. Houel was familiar with the Recollects who had been established in Brouage since 1610. Since the merchants from the Société des Marchands de Rouen et de Saint-Malo were paying Champlain's expensive transportation costs, they insisted he and Houel choose effective yet inexpensive missionaries to join the voyage. Thus, the vows of poverty observed by friars played in their favor. Champlain was also influenced by the successful Franciscan missions in the New World and in Japan. Furthermore, the Jesuit Acadian mission had failed in 1613 following a British raid led by Captain Samuel Argall against Port Royal in present-day Nova Scotia. There had also been resentment towards Jesuits in France at the time when Champlain was planning his mission. Echoes of controversies between the Jesuits and Jean de Biencourt de Poutrincourt et de Saint-Just, the lieutenant-governor of Acadia, involving comments made about the regicide of King Henry IV on 14 May 1610, resonated in France. These events persuaded Champlain that the Recollects were the right religious order to bring to New France. The Recollects travelled to New France with Champlain in 1615, where they first arrived at Tadoussac in May 1615, and later travelled to Quebec City in June 1615.

Father Denis Jamet, the commissary overseeing the establishment of the mission in New France, Fathers Joseph Le Caron, Jean Dolbeau, and Brother Pacifique Duplessis (du Plessis) were chosen as missionaries to accompany Champlain. Although the Recollects were not the first religious order in New France (the Jesuits had been in Acadia since 1611), they were the first to enter and establish themselves as an order in the province of Quebec. Upon arrival the Recollet Fathers formed a conclave to divide the territory of Quebec. Jean Dolbeau was assigned the northern shore of the Saint Lawrence Valley, the territory of the Montagnais (Innu), as well as the post of Tadoussac. Joseph Le Caron was given the Huron mission and other Amerindian populations in the regions of the Great Lakes. Denis Jamet receives missions between Quebec City and Trois-Rivières.

As part of the Anglo-French War of 1626–1629 in Europe, the British captured Quebec City on 20 July 1629. On 9 September that year, the Recollects were forced to return to France along with the Jesuits, who were forcibly removed on 21 July. The two groups of friars were transported to Calais, France, where they arrived on 29 October 1629. The Recollects petitioned the French government several times between 1630 and 1637 to return to New France, but were blocked by Cardinal Richelieu and his agents, who were determined to keep both the Jesuits and the Recollects out of New France. Several Recollects, including veteran missionary Joseph Le Caron, appealed to the Capuchin missionaries, originally from New England, to return the Quebec mission to them. The Capuchins acquiesced, but Cardinal Richelieu ordered that the Jesuits replace the Capuchins in Quebec, additionally forbidding the Recollects from travelling on French ships to New France. Frustrated with the French bureaucracy, the Recollects petitioned the papacy in Rome to return to New France, and succeeded in gaining permission to undertake their endeavour in 1637. However, they were once again denied passage aboard French ships. This conflict continued in 1643 when Queen Anne of Austria, the regent of France, granted their request; but once again no transport was obtained. The Recollects would not re-enter New France until 1670, nearly forty years since their expulsion After returning, they reestablished missions at Quebec, Trois-Rivières, and Montreal. On 22 March 1682 a Recollect chaplain who accompanied LaSalle, Father Zenobius, preached to the Tensas tribe on the lower Mississippi River using his knowledge of the Illinois language. In 1759, British conquest once again interfered with the Franciscans. Five years later, the bishop of Quebec, Jean-François Hubert, annulled the vows of any friar professed after 1784. Their numbers gradually decreased until, by 1791, only five friars remained. The last Canadian Recollect, Father Louis Demers, died in Montreal in 1813.

=== Newfoundland ===
In Newfoundland, Recollect friars established a friary in 1689 at the island's capital, Plaisance (now Placentia), which was staffed until 1701 by friars from Saint-Denis, near Paris. In 1701, they were replaced by friars from Brittany, an arrangement which lasted until the expulsion of the French from Newfoundland in 1714 after the Treaty of Utrecht. In English-speaking Newfoundland, Recollect priests from Ireland played a significant role in the introduction and early leadership of Roman Catholicism on the island, following the public announcement of religious liberty to Roman Catholics by Governor John Campbell in 1784. The evangelization missions taking place between 1615 and 1629 can be divided into three periods. The first, from 1615 to 1623, was a period of discovery: it marked their initial effort at understanding and discovering the regions of Huronia and Tadoussac. During the second phase, from 1623 to 1625, the Recollects concentrated their efforts of evangelization in Huronia. The third period, from 1625 until their expulsion from New France in 1629, marks a time frame in which the Recollects shared their territory with the Jesuits, as the latter only arrived in New France in 1625.

=== Relations with native populations in New France ===
Recollect and Jesuit missionaries were very much the same, in the sense that both orders sought to Christianize natives, while at the same time using similar methodologies. Within the Recollect theory of conversion, the French settlers in New France played a primordial role in the Christianization of indigenous peoples. They believed that colonization and evangelization were inseparable. On the contrary, the Jesuits held their evangelization efforts completely separate from their involvement in the French colony. The Recollects never neglected the French settlers in favour of devoting themselves entirely to the conversion of natives. French settlers were seen by the Recollects as the key to creating their ideal society; they wished to promote French-Native intermarriage, in the hopes of eventually building a larger Christian settlement. In practice, however, the native populations encountered by the Recollects had no intentions on settling permanently in the French colony. This led the missionaries to instead travel alongside indigenous communities in the hopes of teaching them about the Catholic faith, much like their Jesuit counterparts.

The goal of the Recollects in New France was to undertake missionary work among the indigenous peoples who lived there. This work was not without its challenges; for example, language proved a difficult barrier to overcome. To solve this problem, the Recollects recruited truchements (helpers), who were young and resourceful men from humble backgrounds, to interpret indigenous linguistic patterns and respond with gestures and miming. The truchements were supported financially by the missionaries, giving some the opportunity to rise within New France's social ranks. For example, Nicolas Marsolet was granted a seigneury, while Pierre Boucher became governor of Trois-Rivières, later founding the town of Boucherville.

Their return to New France in 1670 was led by Father Germain Allart, accompanied by Gabriel de la Ribourde, Simple Landon, Hilarion Guenin, Anselme Bardoun, and Brother Luc. The territory of Quebec had since been carved up amongst the Jesuits, who claimed the Laurentian Valley and other western territories, and the Sulpicians who owned Montreal and its surrounding region. At this point, the conversion of Amerindians to Christianity was no longer the main priority of the Recollects, as they were more concerned with rebuilding infrastructure that had been left behind following their expulsion by the British in 1629. Nonetheless, they continued to partake in evangelization missions in Gaspesia, in Acadia, and in Louisiana.

The Recollects usually had close connections to the natives. In fact, when they first arrived in New France, they openly welcomed "unruly" native children within their walls in order to teach them the way of God. Even though they quickly realized that they did not have enough money to continue this mission, they still maintained relatively good relations with the natives, especially with the Hurons. As the Recollect Gabriel Sagard shows in his writings, their convent was very close to a few indigenous settlements, and he himself was very good friend with some Hurons. Some even addressed him with Huron kinship terms; some called him Ayein (meaning "son"), and others called him Ataquen (meaning "brother"). He also writes about what a typical day with them looked like: He would usually eat with them, and then he would sometimes follow them as they went about their everyday lives. They taught him about their beliefs, their customs, and they taught him their language, which would later help him in creating a useful dictionary.

=== Legacy ===
Despite their limited financial resources and small numbers, the Recollects were the first to carry out significant missionary work in New France. For example, they were the first pastors in the colony at Port Royal. Jean Dolbeau celebrated the first Mass ever said in Quebec. He became Provincial Commissary of the mission in 1618 and preached the first jubilee accorded to Canada. He built the first friary of the Recollects at Quebec in 1620.

Texts written by Recollect missionaries combined aspects of natural history and ethnography, as they generally paid very close attention to the environments these men lived in. In the case of Sagard, he describes everything that he sees, from plants, to animals, to his relations with the natives he encounters. Compared to the Jesuits, Recollect presence in New France was minimal. The writings of the Recollects were less popular than those of the Jesuits, who targeted a wider audience. Consequently, their works were less influential for the Jesuit writings on New France were considered more authoritative sources on the New World. When writing about their missions, the Recollects emphasized the importance of observing, interacting with and understanding indigenous societies prior to writing about them. Their works often spoke of the difficulties encountered by missionaries when converting natives, which led to these texts being dismissed by readers as pessimistic. This explains, in part with the burning of the Recollects convent in 1796, the small quantity of texts related to the missions which have survived to this day.

Recollects were important in the documentation of indigenous life in New France. Chrestien Leclercq wrote Nouvelle Relation de la Gaspésie, which concerns itself with the ways of life of those indigenous communities that he resided with as a result of his missions among the Mi’kmaq of Gaspésie. As a result of spending so much time among the Mi’kmaq people, Leclercq was able to learn their language. His fluency in their dialect allowed him to compose a dictionary of the Mi’kmaq language, meant to serve as an aid for future missionaries who would live among these First Nations people. Pacifique Duplessis was later sent to Trois-Rivères, where he evangelized Aboriginal communities, cared for the sick, and educated children. Because of the latter, he has been considered the first schoolmaster in New France. In 1620, the Recollects completed construction on the Notre-Dame-des-Agnes convent in Quebec, the first Canadian convent and Seminary. Father Nicolas Viel travelled to Huronia with Gabriel Sagard and other missionaries to assist Father Le Caron. As a result of this voyage, Sagard published one of his more notable works Le grand voyage du Pays des Hurons (1632) and later his Histoire du Canada (1636) in which he described the daily life, customs, and habits of the Hurons.

To this day Leclercq's Nouvelle Relation de la Gaspésie and Sagard's Le grand voyage du Pays des Hurons is considered an important piece belonging to the large corpus of texts published on eastern Canada during its French regime.

== In other countries ==
The Recollects were also present in other parts of the world. In 1521, the Province des Anges sent a few missionaries, R.P. Martin de Valence with nine priests and two fathers in the West Indies, and there, they converted in a very short time more than one thousand and two hundred Indians.

=== Provinces ===
In the late 17th century, the order had these provinces outside of Europe: four in New Spain, four in Peru, and two elsewhere in Latin America and two in Southeast Asia.

Four provinces in New Spain

- Province du Saint Évangile (lit. 'Holy Gospel')
- Province des Apostres Saint Pierre & Saint Paul de Mechiocam ("The Apostles Sts. Peter & Paul, Michoacán")
- Province de Saint Joseph de Jucatam ("St. Joseph, Yucatán")
- Province du Très-Saint Nom de Jésus de Guatemala ("The Most Holy Name of Jesus, Guatemala")

Four provinces in the Viceroyalty of Peru

- Province des Douze Apostres de Lima ("The Twelve Apostles, Lima")
- Province de Saint François de Quito ("St. Francis, Quito")
- Province de la Très-Sainte Trinité de Chilo ("The Most Holy Trinity, Chile")
- Province de Sainte Foy au Royaume de Grenade ("The Holy Faith, the Kingdom of the New Granada")

Four more provinces

- Province de Saint Georges de Nicaraga ("St. George, Nicaragua")
- Province de Saint Grégoire des îles Philippines ("St. Gregory, the Philippine islands")
- La Custodie de Saint Antoine du Brésil ("St. Anthony, Brazil")
- La Custodie de Saint François de Malaca ("St. Francis, Malacca")

=== Latin America ===
Argentina

The Recollect monastery/convent in Buenos Aires is where the neighborhood of Recoleta got its name.

Guatemala

The Recollects established a friary in Antigua, Guatemala. It was destroyed by the Santa Marta earthquakes of 1773 and is preserved today as a national monument, La Recolección Architectural Complex.

Paraguay

The Recollect monastery/convent in Asunción was nationalised by José Gaspar Rodríguez de Francia in 1824.

=== Germany and the Lowlands ===
Through the presence of Spanish rule in the Low Countries, the reform took hold there, and then spread to the German friars. By the end of the 17th century, all of the provinces of the German-Belgian Nation of the Order of Friars Minor were Recollect. This branch of the Recollects did not die out with the French Revolution but survived and was reinvigorated in the 19th century.

By that period, it was one of the four major branches of the Order of Friars Minor, all of which lived under obedience to the minister general of the order, but under their own procurators general. All of them were merged in the Great Union of 1897 mandated by Pope Leo XIII. At that time, there were seven provinces of Recollects.

== Notable Recollect friars ==
- Jan Boeksent, a Baroque sculptor from Flanders.
- Francis Davenport (Christopher Davenport), an English theologian, authored a treatise on the Thirty-nine Articles.
- Joseph de La Roche Daillon, a missionary; he discovered that the indigenes in what is now New York State were using petroleum.
- Jean Dolbeau, one of the original four Recollects in Canada. He later returned to France.
- Louis Hennepin accompanied La Salle on his expedition to western New France, helped bring attention to Saint Anthony Falls and Niagara Falls.
- Denis Jamet, leader of the first Recollects in New France, he completed the first regular convent of the Recollects in 1621. He celebrated the first Recollect mass in the New World in 1615.
- Joseph Le Caron, a tutor to the duke of New Orleans, one of the four original Recollects in New France. He compiled a Huron dictionary.
- Gabriel Sagard, a missionary who arrived in New France in 1623. He is best known for his records of the Huron language, including a dictionary. He also wrote Le grand voyage du Pays des Hurons, an ethnographic work.
- Nicholas Viel, the first Franciscan martyr in Canada, drowned by the Hurons while returning to Quebec City.
- Chrétien Le Clercq (Chrestien Leclercq), the first Recollect missionary to be assigned to the missions of the Mi’kmaq in Gaspesia, author of a French-Mi’kmaq dictionary and the ethnographic document Nouvelle Relation de la Gaspésie.
- Pacifique Duplessis (du Plessis), one of the original four Recollects in New France.

== Timeline ==
- 1606: Marie de Medicis laid down the first stone of the first Recollect chapel in France.
- 1610: Champlain is trying to find missionaries to go to the New World, he will ask to the Jesuits and then to the Recollects.
- 1611: Joseph le Caron becomes a Recollect.
- 1615: Father Chapouin sends four Recollects to accompany Champlain in his trip to Canada. Father le Caron is the first lettered European to go to Huronia. He will then have to come back to France to write a report, but he will return later to continue his mission in Quebec and Tadoussac.
- 1619: Recollects from Aquitaine – Father Sébastien (died 1623), Rev. Jacques Cardon, Jacques de la Foyer and Louis Fontinier – start a mission in Acadia on the Saint John River.
- 1619-1621: Construction of the Recollect convent in Quebec, on the Saint-Charles River. It was named after Charles de Boves, grand vicaire (vicar general) of Pontoise, who died soon after 1620, and who protected the Canadian Recollect mission.
- 1623: Sagard arrives in Quebec on 28 June, accompanied by Fathers Nicolas Viel and Joseph Le Caron. On 16 July he leaves Quebec to go to Huronia, where he arrives on 20 August. He then settles in Quieuindahian and then later in Quieunonascaron.
- 1624: Sagard and the others leave Huronia to go back to Quebec and then to France in autumn.
- 1632: Father Joseph Le Caron dies. A new edition of Voyages by Champlain deletes any allusion of the Recollect missionaries from precedent years. On this year, some Recollects were not allowed to embark on a boat to Quebec; three Jesuits went instead, including Father Paul Le Jeune.
- 1670: After a change in the colony's politics, the Recollect of Saint-Denis were finally allowed to come back to their old convent in Quebec.
- 1691: Parisian bookseller Amable Auroy publishes two new books written by Chrétien Le Clercq: Nouvelle Relation de Gaspésie and Premier Etablissement de la foi dans la Nouvelle-France.

== Bibliography ==
- Champlain, Samuel (1907). Voyages of Samuel de Champlain. 1604–1618. New York: Scribener's Sons. pp. 272–276.
- Deslandres, Dominique (2003). Croire et faire croire : Les missions françaises au XVIIe siècle (1600–1650). Paris: Fayard. p. 204.
- Dumas, G.M. "Chrestien Leclercq". Dictionary of Canadian Biography. Retrieved 26 February 2015.
- Galland, Caroline (2012). Pour la gloire de Dieu et du Roi : Les récollets en Nouvelle-France aux XVII^{e} et XVIII^{e} siècles. Éditions du Cerf. pp. 49–52.
- Le Clercq, Chrestien. First Establishment of the Faith in New France. Charleston, South Carolina: Nabu Press. pp. 304–306.
- Le Fèbvre, Hyacinthe (1677). Histoire Chronologique de la Province des Récollets de Paris (Denys Thierry ed.). Paris: Bibliothèque Québécoise. p. 32.
- Lenhart, John (1945). "Who kept the Recollects out of Canada in 1632?". Franciscan Studies 5 (3): 280–284.
