= Couvent des Récollets de Paris =

Franciscan friary, Paris

Coordinates: 48.8753°N 2.3605°E

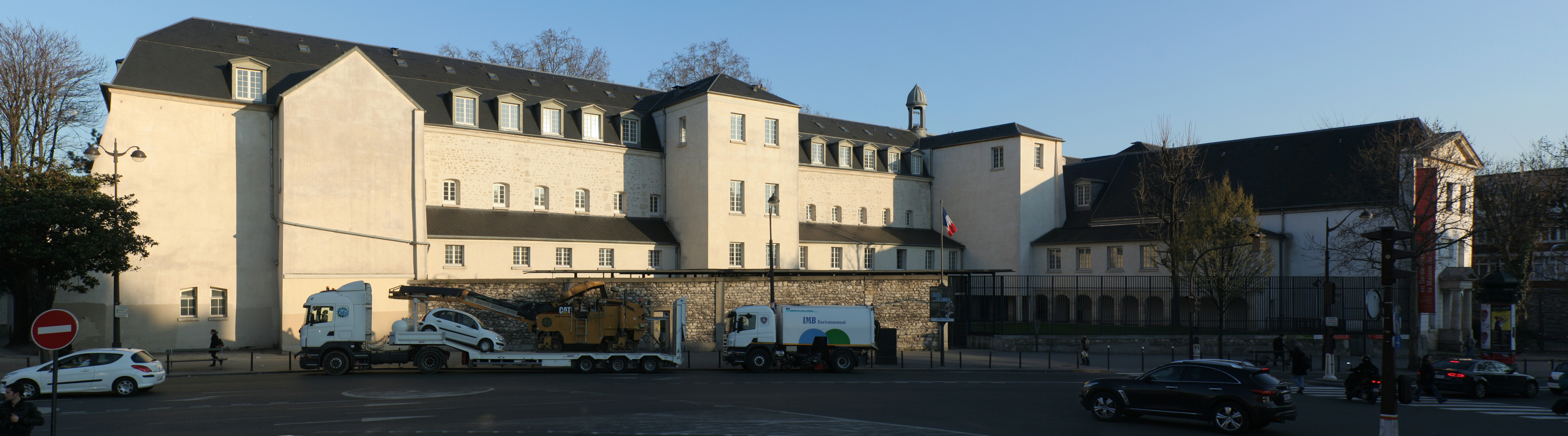
View of the former friary

The Couvent des Récollets de Paris is a former Franciscan friary in Paris. It has been a listed monument historique since 1974.

== History ==
Henry IV of France granted the Récollets permission to build a friary on land two paces from the church of Saint-Laurent which had been given them by his tapestry maker Jacques Cottard. They initially built a small church and the foundation stone of the friary; a larger church was established by Marie de Medici on 30 August 1614.

The friary closed in 1790 and the building was turned into a military hospital for incurables in 1802. In 1861 the incurable cases were moved to the Hospice des Incurables d'Ivry and the former friary became the Saint-Martin military hospital, before being renamed after the military doctor Jean-Antoine Villemin in 1913. Near the Gare du Nord and the Gare de l'Est, it was heavily used during both world wars and was still in use during the Algerian War.

It finally closed as a hospital in 1968 and was long threatened with demolition before being made a historic monument in 1974. It now houses Lerichemont, part of RIVP.
