= Chrestien Le Clercq =

French writing system inventor

Chrestien Le Clercq, O.M.R., (born 1641) was a Recollect Franciscan friar and missionary to the Mi'kmaq on the Gaspé peninsula of Canada in the mid-17th century. He was a chronicler of New France, who wrote two early histories, and translator of a Native American language of that region, adapting an apparently indigenous mnemonic glyph system into a writing system known as Míkmaq hieroglyphic writing.

== Life ==
A Fleming by birth, Le Clercq joined the Recollect Province of St. Anthony, based in Artois. He was sent to the missions of the French colonial empire in Canada in 1675. On 11 October of that year, he was put in charge of the Mi’kmaq mission by Francois de Laval, the Bishop of Quebec. There he learned the language of that tribe and devoted himself to its evangelization. In 1676 he tried to persuade the Mi’kmaq that it would be more advantageous to build houses in the French manner, which earned him a stunning rebuke from the Mi’kmaw Chief.

Le Clercq, said that he had seen some Mi'kmaq children using charcoal to write on birchbark with hieroglyphics. He was inspired by this to adapt these symbols to teach hymns and prayers. The Mi'kmaq sometimes used porcupine quills directly into the bark in the shape of symbols.

Le Clercq's superiors sent him back to France in 1680 on business connected with the Franciscan missions in Canada. He returned the following spring with letters authorizing the foundation of a friary in Montreal, where he went during the summer of 1681 to carry out this work. In November he returned to the Mi’kmaq mission, where he spent the next twelve years.

In autumn 1686 Le Clercq left Canada permanently and returned to France, where he filled various positions of authority in the Artois Province of his Order. The date of his death is unknown, but he was still living in 1698. After his return to France, he completed two works which he published at Paris in 1691. An English translation of one of these works, Nouvelle Relation de la Gaspésie, was provided by William F. Ganong in 1910 as part of the Champlain Society's General Series.
