= Musée des Beaux-Arts et d'Archéologie de Châlons-en-Champagne =

Coordinates: 48.9567°N 4.3635°E

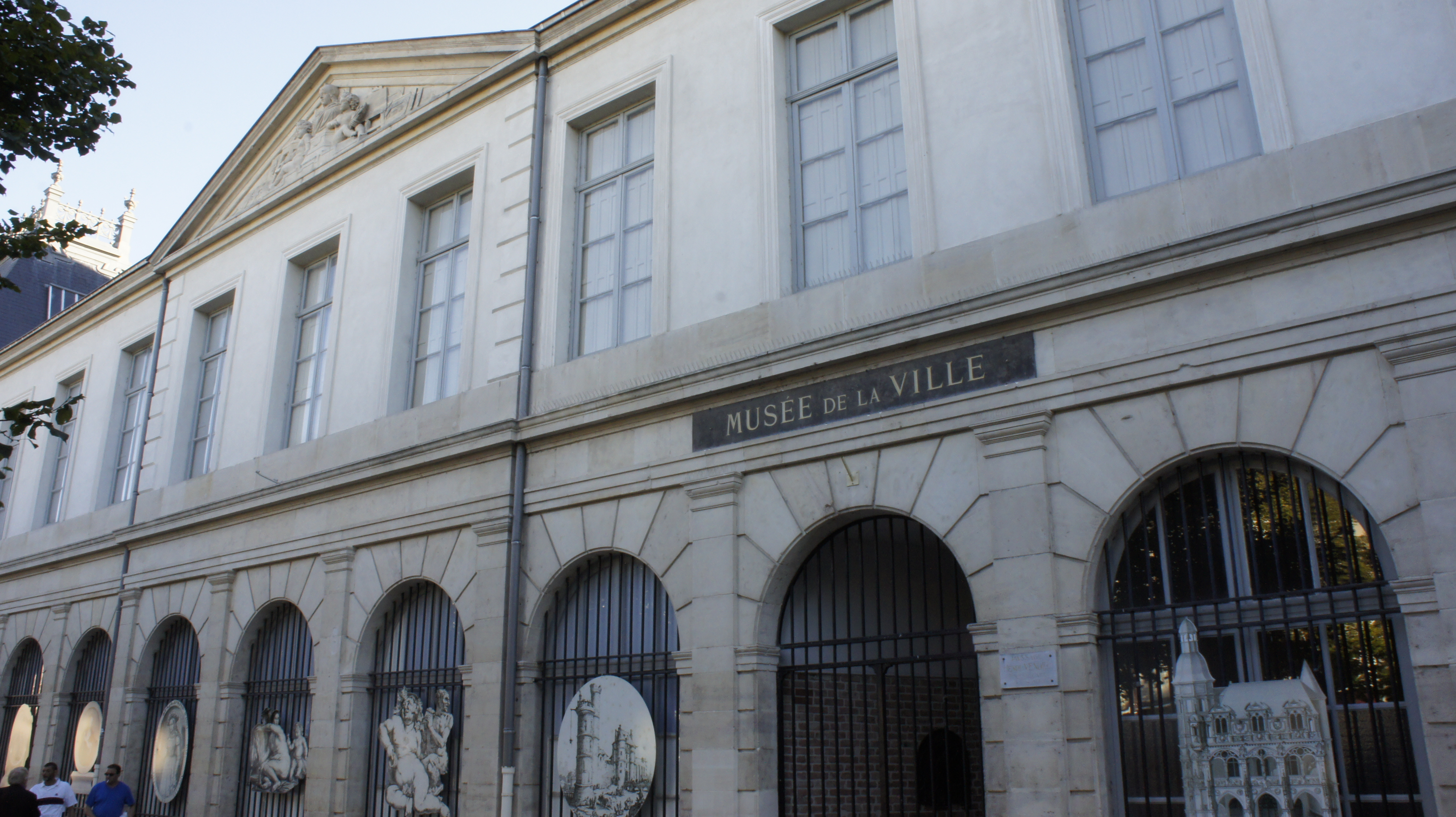
Facade of the museum

The musée des Beaux-Arts et d'Archéologie de Châlons-en-Champagne is a French art and archaeology museum on place Godart in Châlons-en-Champagne. It was set up as the museum for the department in 1794 to house artworks confiscated from émigrés and religious houses.

== Sources ==
(in French)

- http://www.culture.gouv.fr/public/mistral/joconde_fr?ACTION=CHERCHER&FIELD_8=MUSEO&VALUE_8=5110801
- Jean-Pierre Ravaux, Histoire du musée de Châlons-en-Champagne de la Révolution au Second Empire; Mémoires de la SACSAM, tome CXI – 1996, et dans Mélanges en hommage à Jean-Pierre Ravaux, édition de la SAMCC, 2010.
