= Charles-Honoré Laverdière =

Canadian priest and historian (1826–1873)

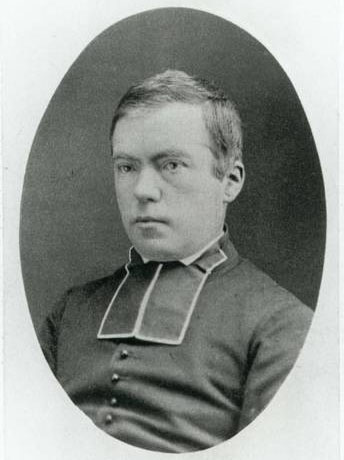
- Born: 23 October 1826; Château-Richer, Lower Canada
- Died: 10 March 1873 (aged 46); Quebec City, Quebec, Canada
- Known for: Edition of Samuel de Champlain's work and the Journal des Jésuites.
- Scientific career
- Fields: Early Canadian history and archeology
- Workplaces: Laval University
- Notable students: Charles-Eusèbe Dionne

Charles-Honoré Cauchon dit Laverdière (23 October 1826 – 10 March 1873) was a French-Canadian priest and historian.

== Biography ==
Laverdière was born in Château-Richer, East of Quebec City, on 23 October 1826. His parents, Charles Cauchon, dit Laverdière (Laverdière never used Cauchon as his family name) and Théotiste Cauchon, were farmers. He studied at the Séminaire de Québec from 1840 onward, and proved brilliant, being promoted to assistant professor of physics and collaborating to the foundation of the student newspaper, through which he published several collections of canticles. He was ordained in 1851.

Laverdière never did any parish duty, and would dedicate his life to teaching and scholarly work. Soon after his ordination he was officially appointed to the Seminary, and taught there until he was appointed to the chair of history at Université Laval in 1863, succeeding to Jean-Baptiste-Antoine Ferland (who had just been promoted to dean of the faculty, and died in 1865). In the meantime and in addition to his teaching duties at the seminary, he acted as de facto deputy librarian at the university and, in 1858, actual librarian. Laverdière also had an interest in archeology, though he worked relatively little in that area.

Laverdière published a number of works that are recognized for their outstanding quality. He participated in the 1858 publication of the Relations des Jésuites de la Nouvelle-France, for which he contributed a synoptic table of contents. His 1869 Histoire du Canada was used until the end of the century, and was described as "very accurate in relation to the historical knowledge of the time", but "severely judged from a pedagogical and literary point of view". It is a rare example of a French-Canadian school manual directly touting its nihil obstat. That same year he edited the second volume of Ferland's Cours d'histoire du Canada. His major works, however, remain the 1870 annotated edition of the compiled works of Samuel de Champlain. Œuvres de Champlain attracted considerable attention, and is still considered an important work, although Laverdière's opinion that the Jesuits had falsified the 1632 edition of Champlain remains controversial. Laverdière's other major work was the edition, in collaboration with Henri-Raymond Casgrain, of the Journal des Jésuites. When most prints of an early edition of that work were destroyed, Laverdière commented that it would merely mean that some misprints could be corrected for the next printing. He was abruptly stricken by apoplexy while discussing details of a new edition at a printing house on 10 March 1873.

An almost obsessive attention to detail (he could spend an entire day checking a single fact) marked Laverdière's work. An amiable man "of medium height, with keen black eyes, tanned complexion and square shoulders," he devoted his life to historical scholarship. His work, alongside that of other historians of the time like Narcisse-Eutrope Dionne and Louis-Philippe Turcotte, marked a revival of interest for history in late 19th century Quebec. Laverdière's papers are part of the collections of the Musée de la Civilisation.
