= Notre-Dame-en-Vaux =

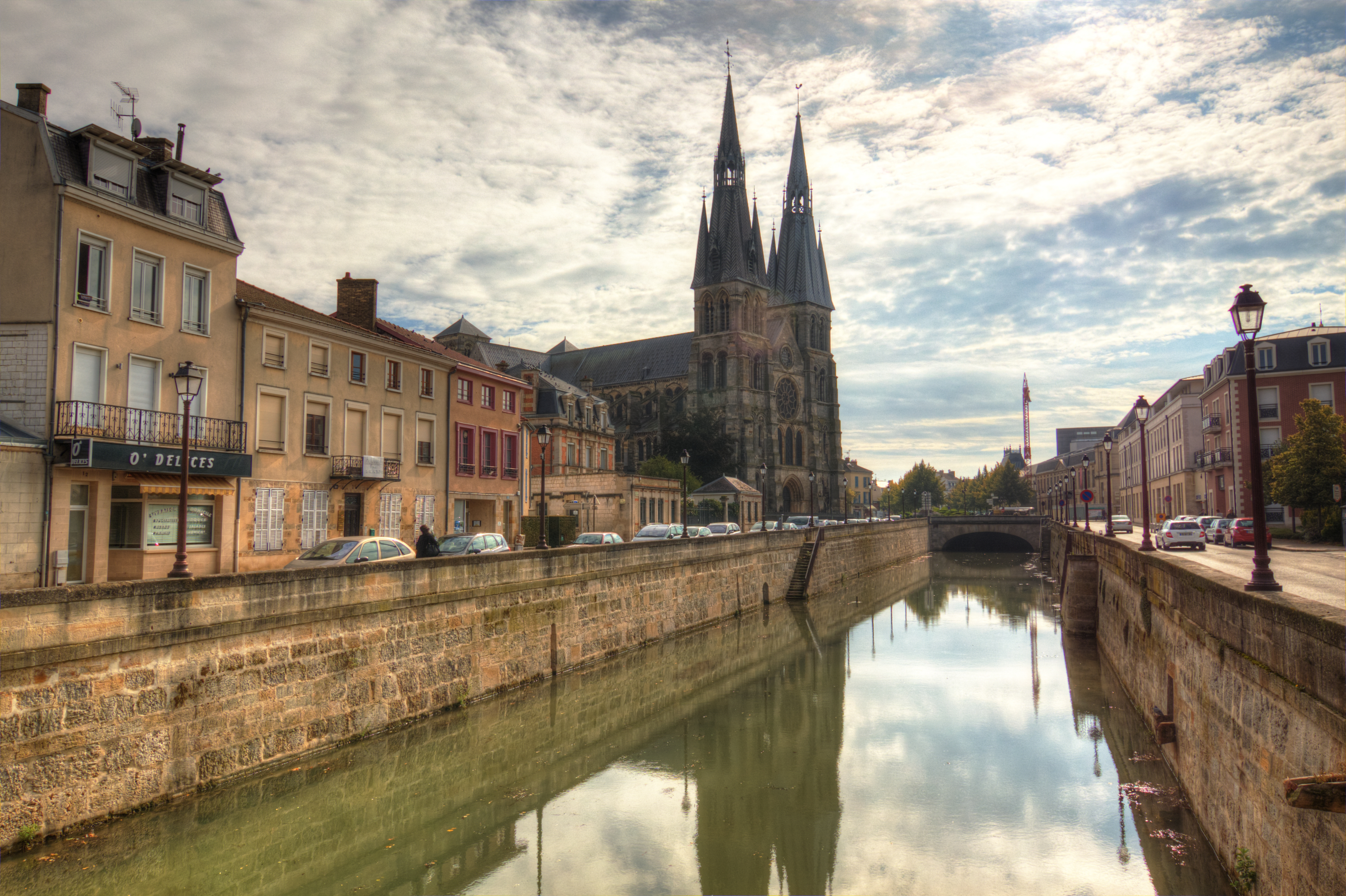
- Façade of the Collegiate church

- Location within France
- 48.95769°N 4.36370°E
- Location: Châlons-en-Champagne
- Country: France
- Denomination: Roman Catholic

History
- Founded: 1157
- Dedication: Our Lady

Architecture
- Heritage designation: World Heritage (1998)
- Architectural type: church
- Style: Romanesque, Gothic

Administration
- Diocese: Châlons

The Notre-Dame-en-Vaux is a Roman Catholic church located in Châlons-en-Champagne. The cathedral is a major masterpiece in Marne.

== History ==
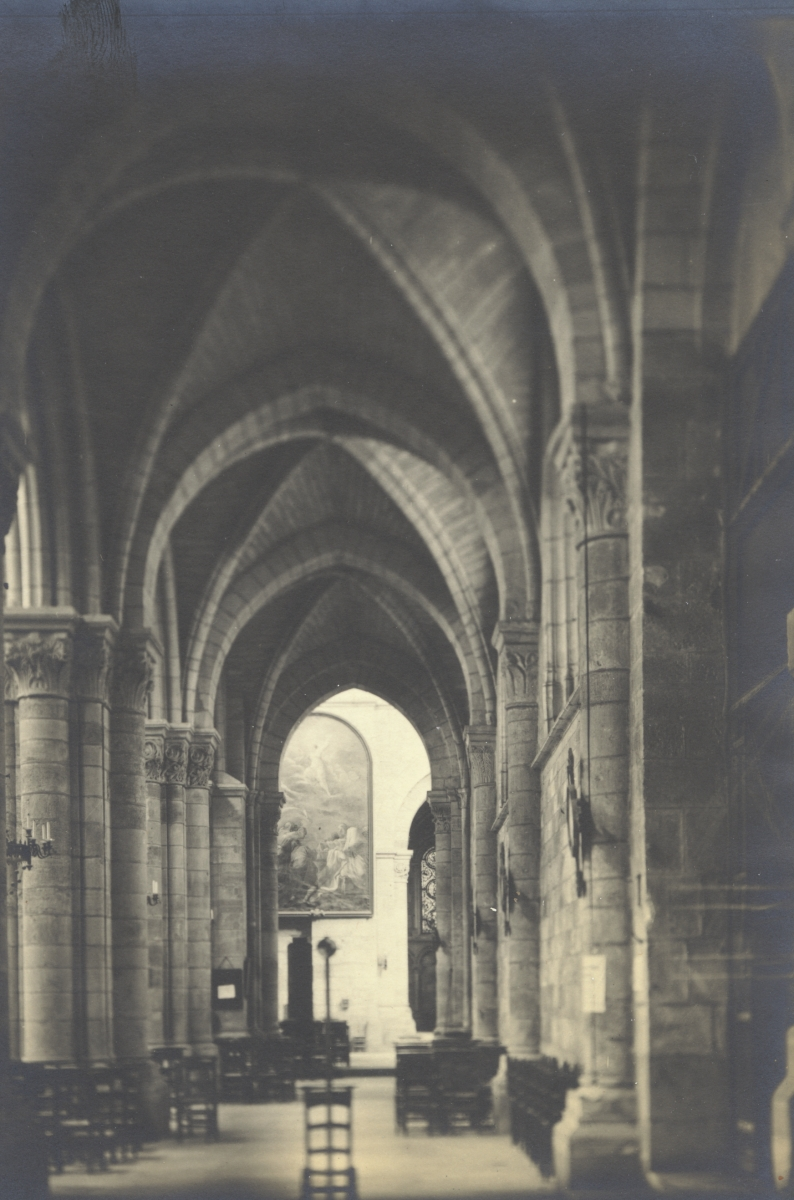
Church of Notre Dame en Vaux, Chalons sur Marne, France, 1903. No number. Right aisle

Started around 1157, ended in 1217.

The church was classified a historic monument in 1840. In 1998 it was registered on the World Heritage List by UNESCO under the title of "roads to St Jacques de Compostela in France".

== Gallery ==
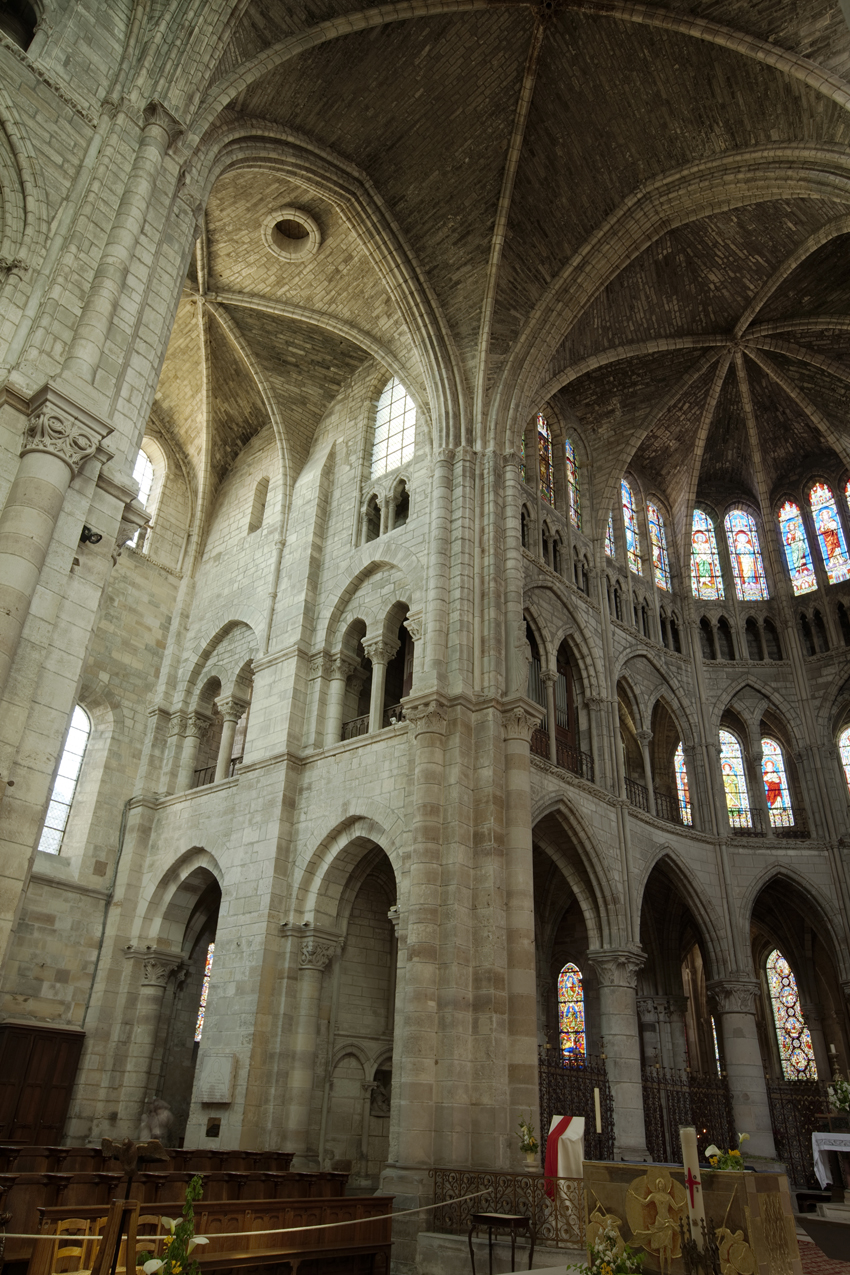
Transept.

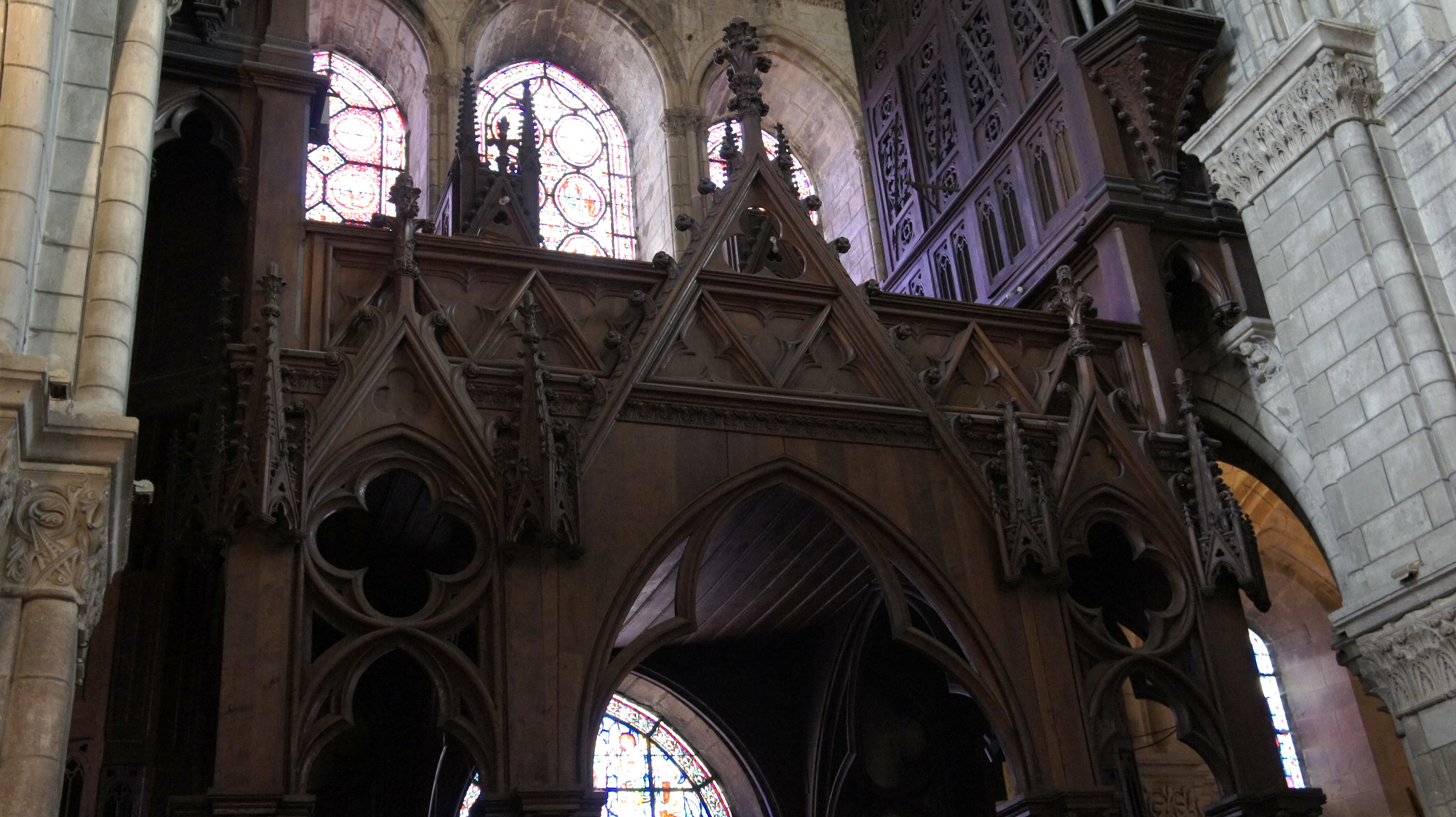
Pipe organ.

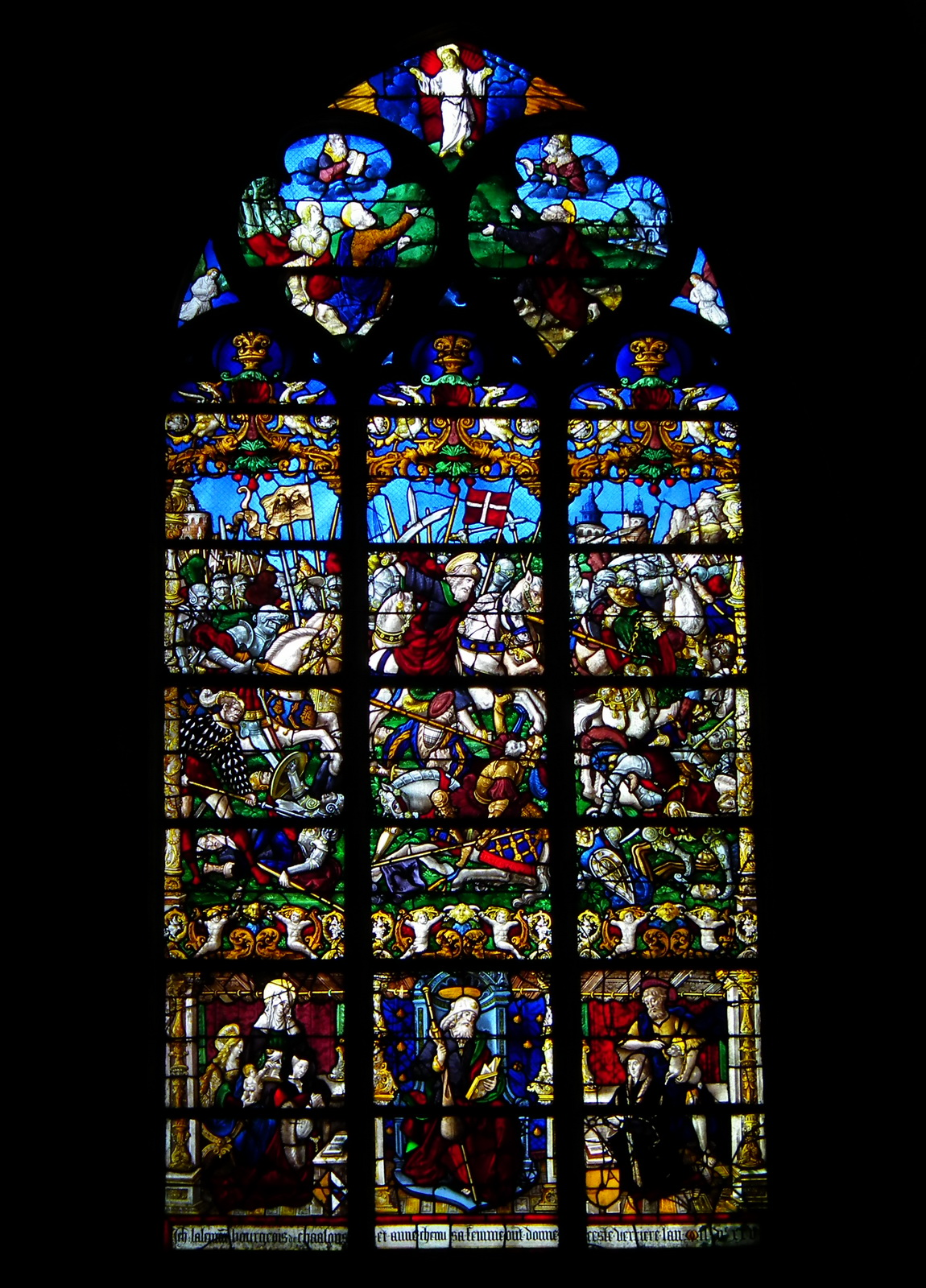
Jame's life in stained glass.

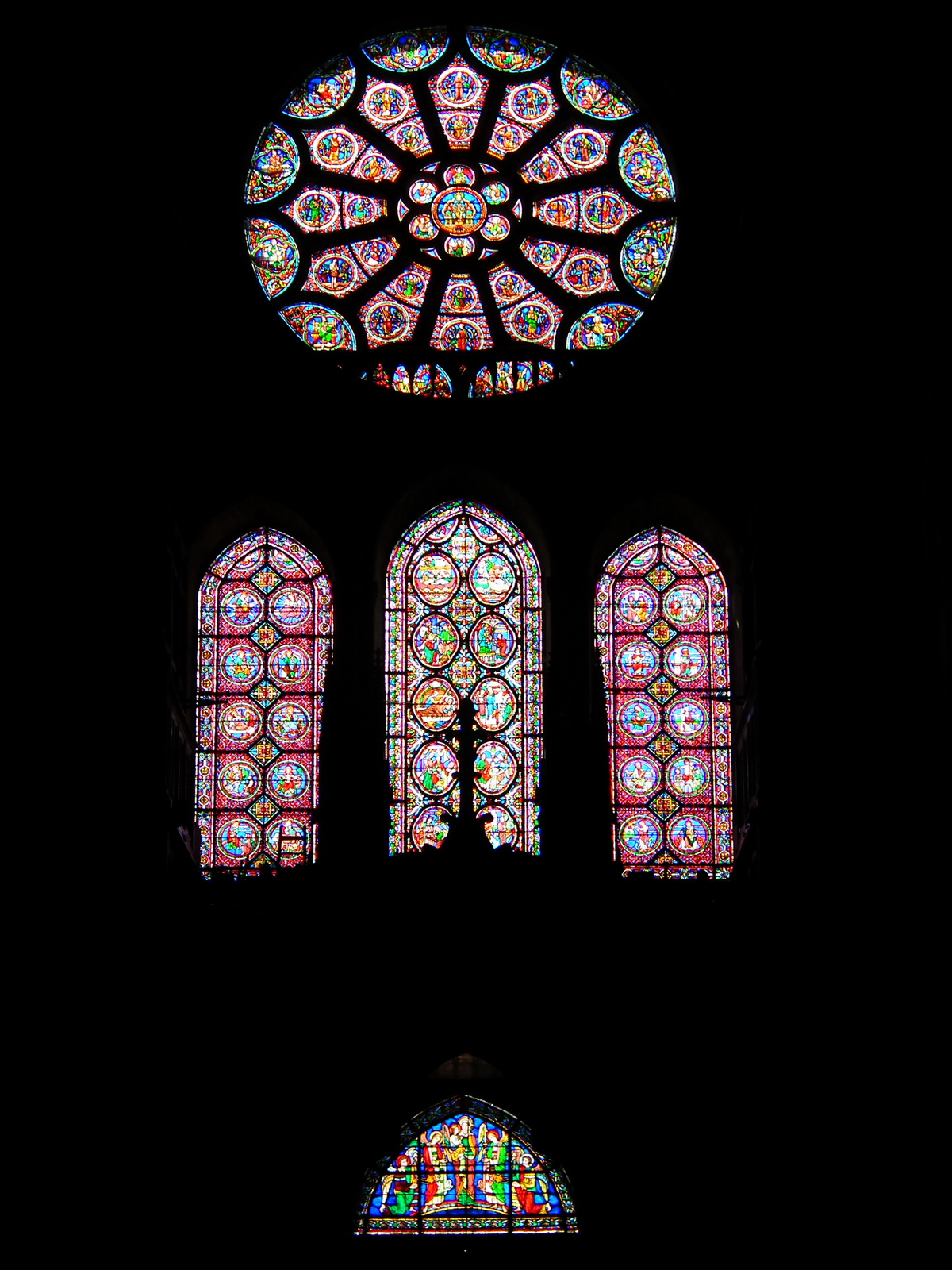
West portal.

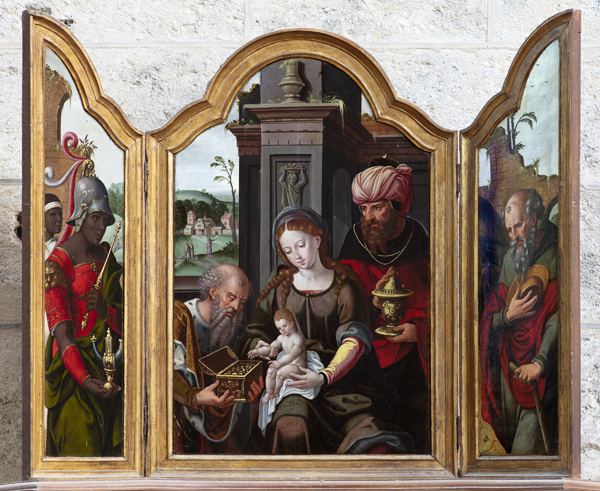
Adoration of the Magi.

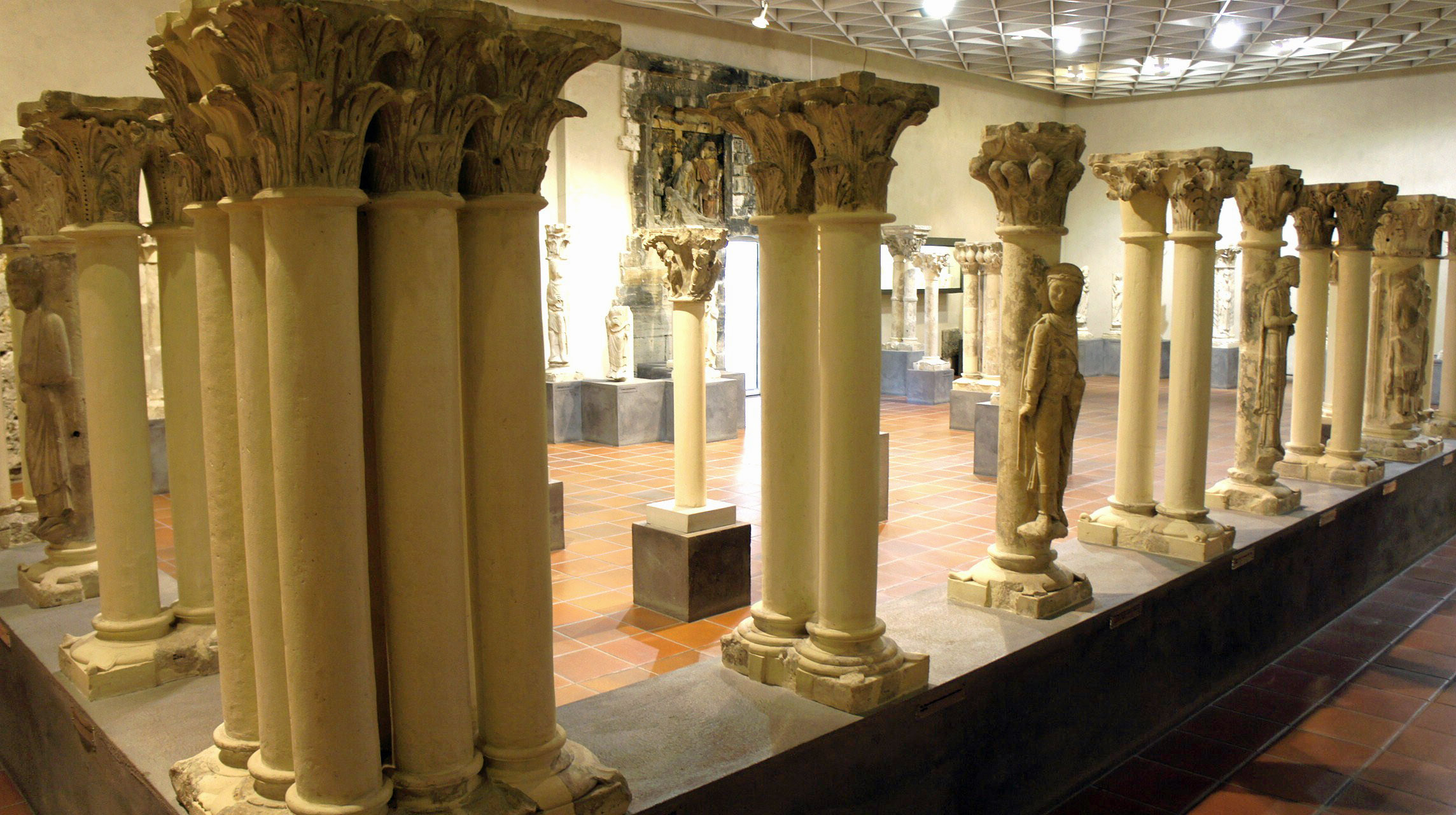
Cloister museum.

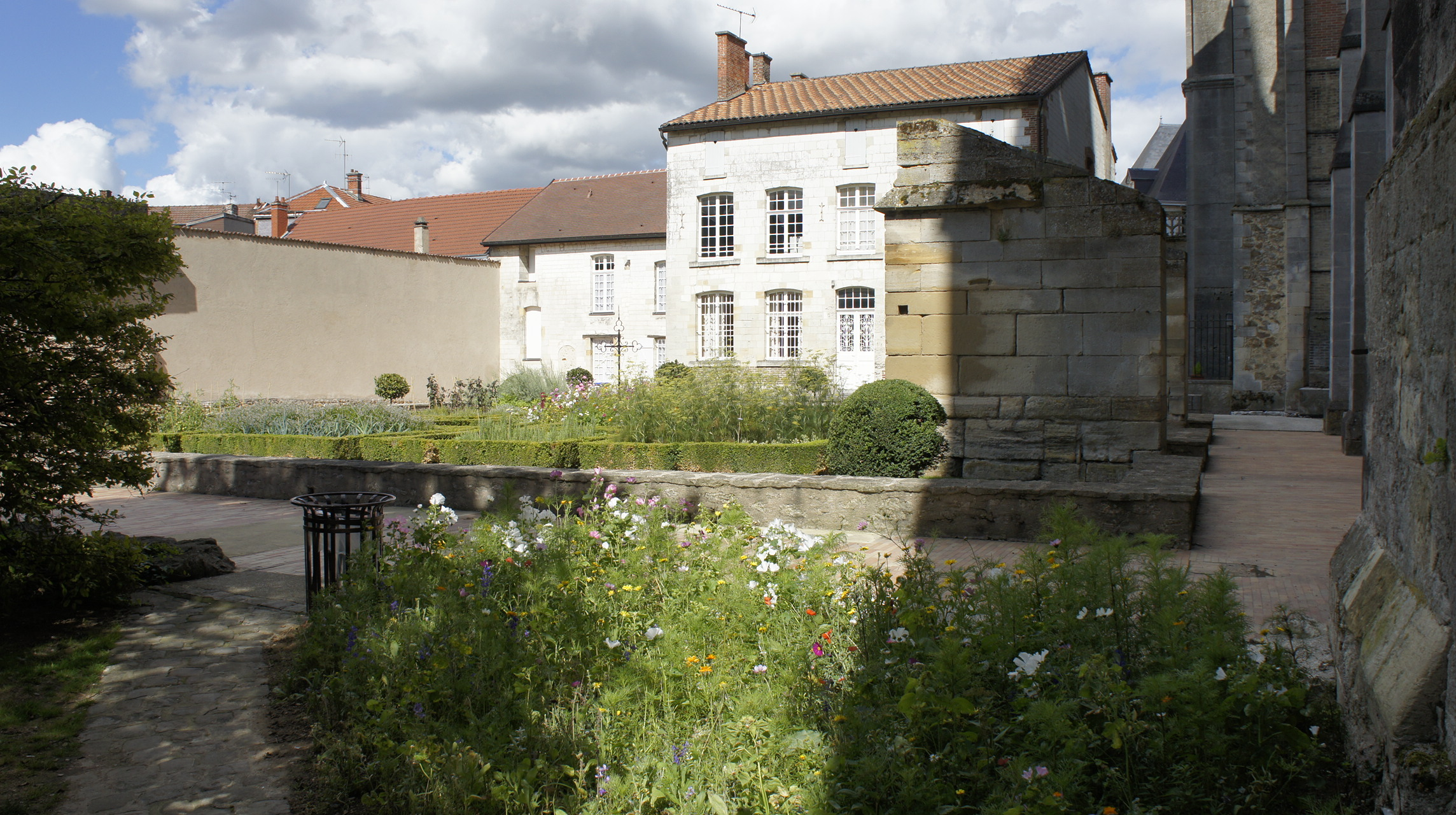
Cloister.
