= Jean Dolbeau =

Jean Dolbeau, O.M.R., (12 March 1586 – 9 June 1652) was a Recollect friar, one of the four Recollects who were the first Catholic missionaries to northern New France, present day Canada. Dolbeau-Mistassini in Quebec is named for him.

== Life ==
Jean Dolbeau, born in the ancient Province of Anjou, France (now the Department of Maine-et-Loire), entered the Recollects, a reform branch of the Order of Friars Minor, known for their strict poverty, at the age of nineteen at Balmette, near Angers.

When Samuel de Champlain was seeking clergy to help in the religious life of his new colony, Dolbeau was one of the four Recollect friars chosen to embark on the mission. He landed at Quebec in May 1615, and celebrated the first Mass ever said there. He became Provincial Commissary of the mission in 1618 and preached the first jubilee accorded to Canada. He built the first friary of the Recollects at Quebec in 1620.

He returned to France in 1625, taking with him an indigenous young boy, who was later baptized at Angers. Dolbeau then served successively as Master of novices, Guardian, definitor, and provincial delegate at the General Chapter of the Order held in Spain in 1633.

He died at the convent of Orléans, France, on 9 June 1652.
