= Gabriel Sagard =

Franciscan friar and missionary to Canada

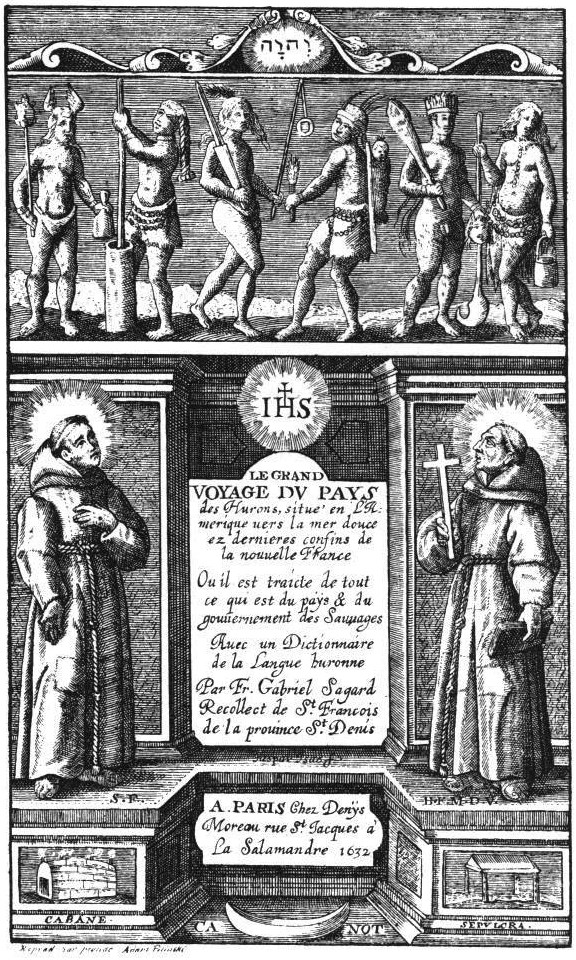
Le Grand Voyage du Pays des Hurons, Friar Gabriel Sagard, O.M.R. (1632)

Gabriel Sagard, OMR (fl. 1614–1636) was a French lay brother and member of the Recollects, a reform branch of the Order of Friars Minor known for its strict poverty. He was among the first Christian missionaries to New France, and is notable for his writings on the colony and on the Hurons (or Wendat).

Sagard's origins, and the dates of his birth and death are obscure. Some historians say he was christened Théodat, others believe that Théodat was his religious name, which, however, is less likely as his signature on his works is under the name of Gabriel (see illustration).

Sagard arrived in New France 28 June 1623. He was sent to accompany Father Nicholas Viel, where they joined four other members of their Order who had been there since 1615, led by Father Joseph Le Caron. In August, Sagard traveled to a Huron village on the southern shore of Lake Huron (what is now Georgian Bay, Ontario) where he began his missionary work and study of the Huron language. In July 1624, he was ordered by his superiors to return to France. All record of him ends some time around 1636. Sagard seems to have either left the Order or he may simply have died while still a friar. Sagard worked with the Hurons.

Sagard is remembered for his writings on New France and the Hurons-Wyandot people, Le grand voyage au pays des Hurons (Paris, 1632). His L'histoire du Canada (1636) included a revised and expanded Le grand voyage and Dictionnaire de la langue huronne (Dictionary of the Huron Language). An English translation of Le grand voyage by historian George M. Wrong was published by the Champlain Society in 1939 as Sagard's long journey to the country of the Hurons. It is available online at the Champlain Society website. An authoritative edition of the dictionary of the Huron language was edited by John Steckley and published in 2009.

In 2022, environmental historians Jennifer Bonnell and Sean Kheraf cited Gabriel Sagard – and specifically his description of giving a French domestic cat, which was exotic and non-indigenous creature North America, to his Indigenous Wendat hosts in 1632. They suggested that Sagard's gift functioned as both a "tool of diplomacy" and a "creature of empire" and that it also "illustrate[d] the methodological challenges at the heart of the [growing] field of animal history."

The geographic township of Sagard in Quebec, Canada, was named in his honour.
