= List of treaties between the Potawatomi and the United States =

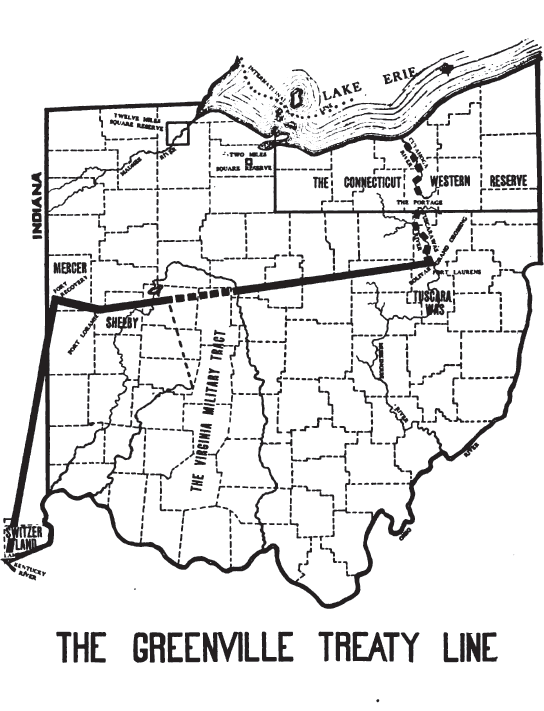
The Greenville Treaty line in Ohio and Indiana

Map showing treaties in Indiana.

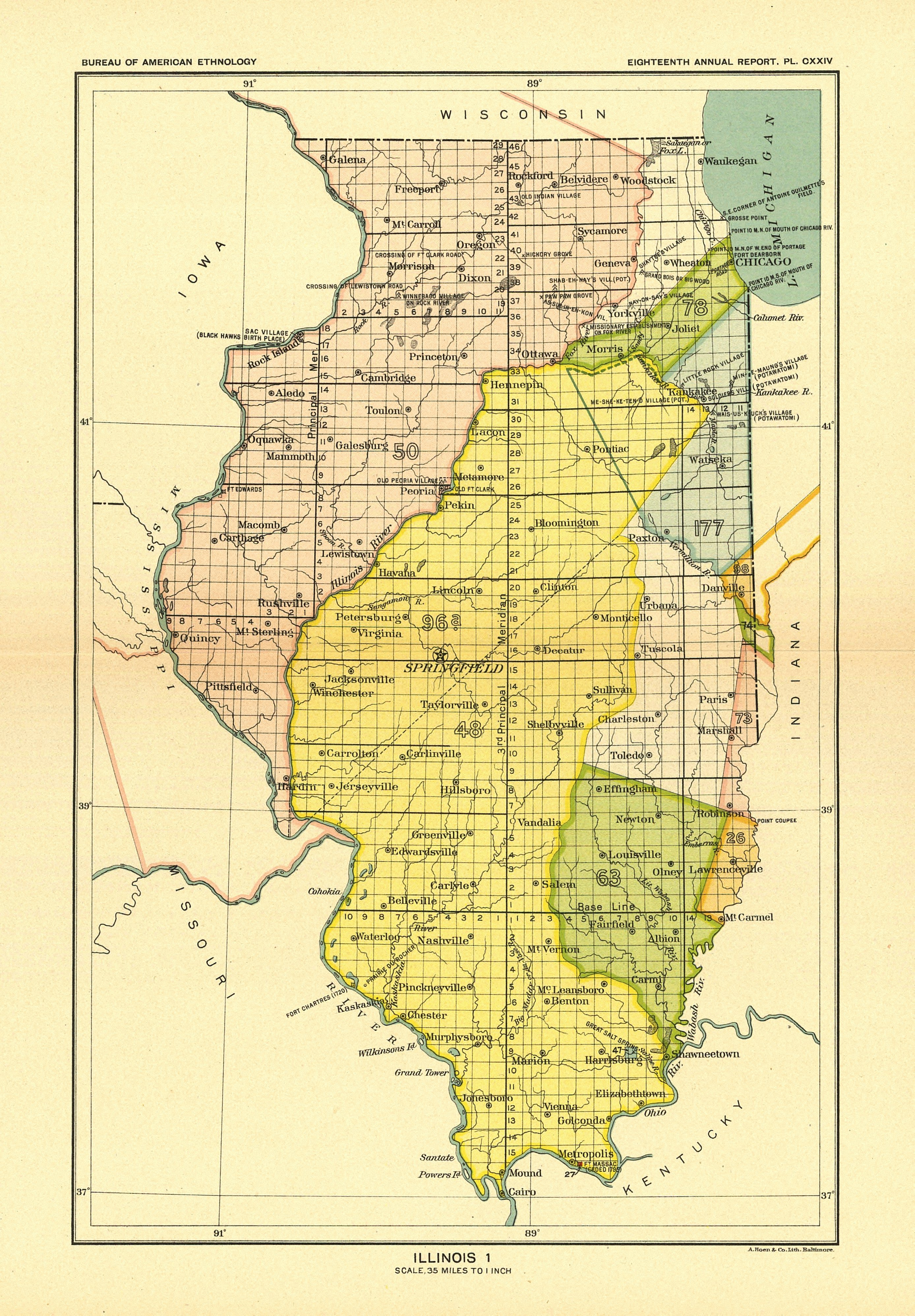
1899 map of Indian Land cessions in Illinois

During the first half of the 19th century, several treaties were concluded between the United States of America and the Native American tribe of the Potawatomi. These treaties concerned the cession of lands by the tribe, and were part of a large-scale effort by the United States government to purchase and thereby extinguish their claims in the Northwest Territory and the Southeast, and to remove all such indigenous peoples to lands west of the Mississippi River.

== Treaties ==
- Treaty of Fort Harmar (1789) - Wyandot, etc.
- Treaty of Greenville (1795) - Wyandot, etc.: lands south and east of a line from Cuyahoga River to Portage, west to Fort Recovery, southwest to the Ohio across from the mouth of the Kentucky River (near Madison, Indiana) - tribes (11); Potawatomi, Shawnee, Delaware, Miami
- Treaty of Fort Wayne (1803) - Delawares, etc.: lands around Vincennes, Indiana -tribes: Miami
- Treaty of Vincennes (1804) - lands along the Ohio River north to the Fort Wayne (1803) treaty boundary. North boundary, line from the Falls of the Ohio to Vincennes. - tribes: Delaware, Piankashaw
- Treaty of Fort Industry (1805) - Wyandot, etc.
- Treaty of Grouseland (1805) - Delawares, etc.: lands south of a line from the northeast corner of the Fort Wayne (1803) treaty east to the Greenville line near Brookville, Indiana. - tribes: Miami, Delaware, Piankashaw, Potawatomi
- Treaty of Detroit (1807) - Council of Three Fires, etc.
- Treaty of Brownstown (1808) - Council of Three Fires, etc.
- Treaty of Fort Wayne (1809) - Delawares, etc.: lands from the East Fork of the White River (nr Seymour) on the Grouseland (1805) boundary west to a point near Danville, Illinois. - tribes: Potawatomi, Delaware, Miami
- Treaty of Fort Wayne (Supplementary) (1809): lands west of the Greenville Line from the Grouseland (1805) line near Napoleon, Indiana, northeast to the W. Fork of the White River east of Muncie, then northeast to Fort Recovery. see above
- Treaty of Greenville (1814): lands, none - peace, end battles from War of 1812. - tribes: Wyandot, Delaware, Shawnee, Seneca, Miami, Potawatomi
- Treaty of Spring Wells (1815) - Council of Three Fires, etc.: official end of the War of 1812
- Treaty of St. Louis (1816) - Council of Three Fires, etc.
- Treaty of Miami Rapids (1817) - Council of Three Fires, etc.: lands; south of the Maumee to the portage
- Treaty of St. Mary's (09/1818) - Council of Three Fires, etc.: New Purchase (1818) -lands, all of central Indiana south of the Wabash, except the Great Miami Reservation (see #9 & #10 below) to the Tippecanoe River. West of the Tippecanoe below a line from Buffalo (east of Monon) to a point near Danville, Illinois. - grants: Josetta Beaubien, Anotoine Bondie, Peter Labadie, Francois Lafontaine, Peter Langlois, Joseph Richardville, and Antoine Rivarre
- Treaty of L'Arbre Croche and Michilimackinac (1820) - Council of Three Fires
- 1821 Treaty of Chicago - Council of Three Fires: lands, north of a line north of the southern tip of Lake Michigan (Indian Boundary), and east of a line running north of the south bend of the St. Joseph River
- First Treaty of Prairie du Chien (1825) - Sioux, etc.
- Treaty of Green Bay (1828) - Winnebago, etc.
- Second Treaty of Prairie du Chien (1829) - Council of Three Fires
- 1833 Treaty of Chicago (1833) - Council of Three Fires

Each of the following treaties is commonly referred to as the Treaty with the Potawatomi, though it was the official title of none of them.

- Treaty of Portage des Sioux (1815)
- Treaty of St. Mary's (10/1818)
- Treaty of Mississinewa (1826): lands, north of the Wabash and south of a line along the St. Joseph River (of Fort Wayne) to the portage to the Eel River, along the Eel to a point near Denver, west to the Tippecanoe River. - tribes: Miami, Potowatomi -grants: 106 (20 Miami, ?? Potowatomi)
- Treaty of Mississinewa (1826): lands, north of a line at the southern tip of Lake Michigan (Indian Boundary Road) to its junction with the Chicago (1821) treaty line. Treaty of Carey Mission (1828) -lands, south of the Chicago (1821) treaty line to a line near S.R. 6 (La Paz-Syracuse) then southeast to the Eel River near Columbia City
- Treaty of St. Joseph (1827)
- Treaty of St. Joseph (1828)
- Treaty of Tippecanoe (10/20/1832): lands, north western Indiana, west of a line running south from South Bend
- Treaty of Tippecanoe (10/26/1832): Pottawatomi lands
- Treaty of Tippecanoe (10/27/1832): lands, north central Indiana, except the Miami National Reservation
- Treaty of Maxeeniekuekee (1834)
- Treaty of Tippecanoe (1834)
- Treaty of Potawattimie Mills (1834)
- Treaty of Wabash (1834): lands, western third of the Miami National Reservation. Wabash River on the north from Logansport to New Waverly and directly south to a line from Frankfort to west of Tipton. -tribes: Miami
- Treaty of Logansport (1834)
- Treaty of Turkey Creek Prairie (1836)
- Treaty of Tippecanoe (03/1836)
- Treaty of Tippecanoe (04/1836)
- Treaty of Logansport (04/22/1836 a)
- Treaty of Logansport (04/22/1836 b)
- Treaty of Yellow River (1836)
- Treaty of Chippewanaung (09/20/1836)
- Treaty of Chippewanaung (09/22/1836)
- Treaty of Chippewanaung (09/23/1836)
- Treaty of Washington (1837)
- Treaty of the Wabash (1840): lands, extinguished the Miami National Reservation. -lands, eastern two-thirds of the Big Miami Reservation. Wabash River on the north from New Waverly to the mouth of the Salamonie River, south to a line from west of Tipton to a point in southern Grant County
- Treaty of Potawatomi Creek (1846) - Council of Three Fires and Potawatomi
- Treaty of Shawnee Reserve (1861)
- Treaty of Washington (1866)
- Treaty of Washington (1867)
