= Treaty of Prairie du Chien =

Treaty of Prairie du Chien may refer to any of four treaties signed in Prairie du Chien, Wisconsin by the United States and Native American peoples of the Upper Midwest:

- First Treaty of Prairie du Chien (1825), delimiting borders between the Sioux, Sac and Fox, Menominee, Iowa, Ho-Chunk and the Council of Three Fires
- Second Treaty of Prairie du Chien (1829), in which the Council of Three Fires ceded territory to the United States
- Third Treaty of Prairie du Chien (1829), in which the Ho-Chunk ceded territory to the United States
- Fourth Treaty of Prairie du Chien (1830), in which the Sac and Fox, Sioux, Omaha, Iowa, Otoe and Missouria ceded territory to the United States

== See also ==
- Prairie du Chien (disambiguation)
