= Treaty of St. Louis =

Treaty of St. Louis may refer to any of 14 treaties between the United States and midwestern Native Americans from 1804 to 1824 signed in or near St. Louis. Specifically it may refer to:

- Treaty of St. Louis (1804), in which the Sauk and Quashquame ceded territory to the United States
- Treaty of St. Louis (1816), in which the Council of Three Fires abandoned their claims to the territory ceded under the Treaty of St. Louis (1804)
- Treaty of St. Louis (1818), in which the Osage ceded territory to the United States
- Treaty of St. Louis (1825), in which the Shawnee ceded territory to the United States
