= Third Treaty of Prairie du Chien =

1829 treaty between the United States and Native Americans

The Treaty of Prairie du Chien may refer to any of several treaties made and signed in Prairie du Chien, Wisconsin between the United States, representatives from the Sioux, Sac and Fox, Menominee, Ioway, Winnebago and the Anishinaabeg (Chippewa, Ottawa and Potawatomi) Native American peoples.

Two treaties were negotiated simultaneously at Prairie du Chien in the summer of 1829, both signed by General John McNeil, Colonel Pierre Menard, and Caleb Atwater for the United States. Both treaties were proclaimed on January 2, 1830.

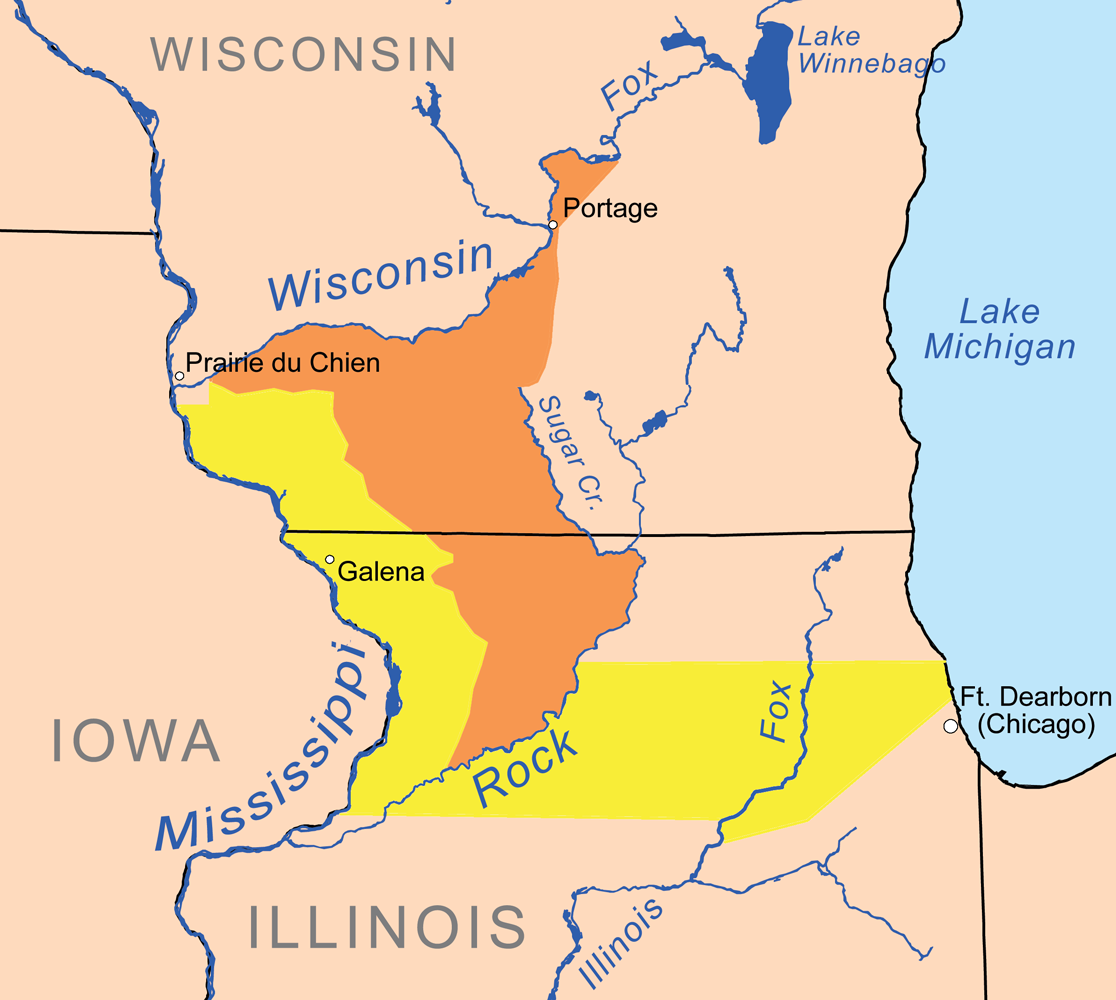
Land ceded to the U.S. at Prairie du Chien in 1829 by the Three Fires Confederacy (in yellow) and the Winnebago (Ho-Chunk) tribe (in orange).

The second of these, the third Treaty of Prairie du Chien, concluded on August 1, 1829, was made between the United States and representatives of the Winnebago tribe. They also ceded land in northwestern Illinois and southwestern Wisconsin.

== See also ==
- Treaty of St. Louis (1804)
- Treaty of St. Louis (1816)
- Treaty of St. Louis (1818)
- Treaty of St. Louis (1825)
- Treaty of Chicago
