= Treaty of Fort Clark =

1808 treaty between the United States and Osage

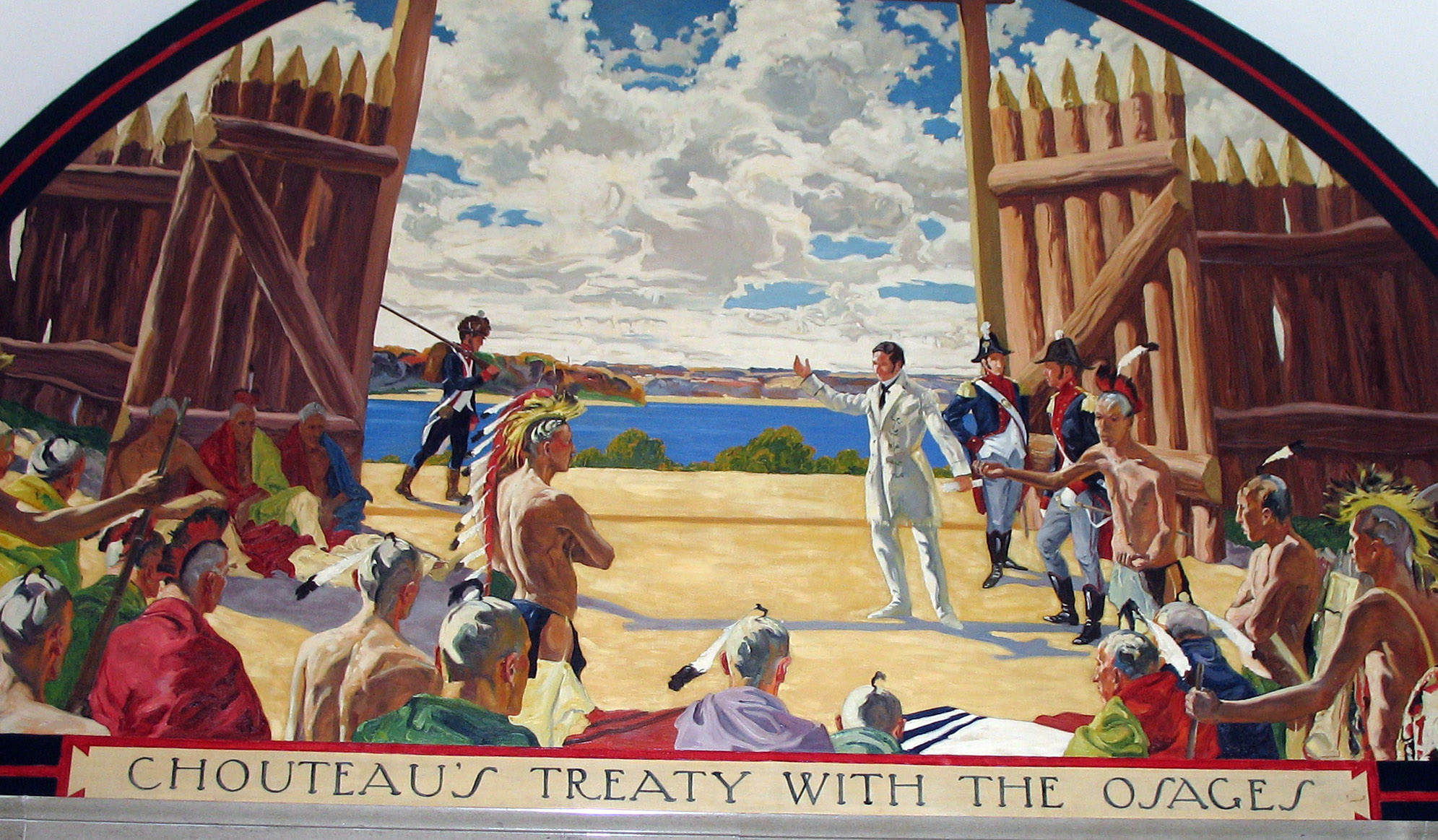
Mural depicting the treaty from the Missouri State Capitol

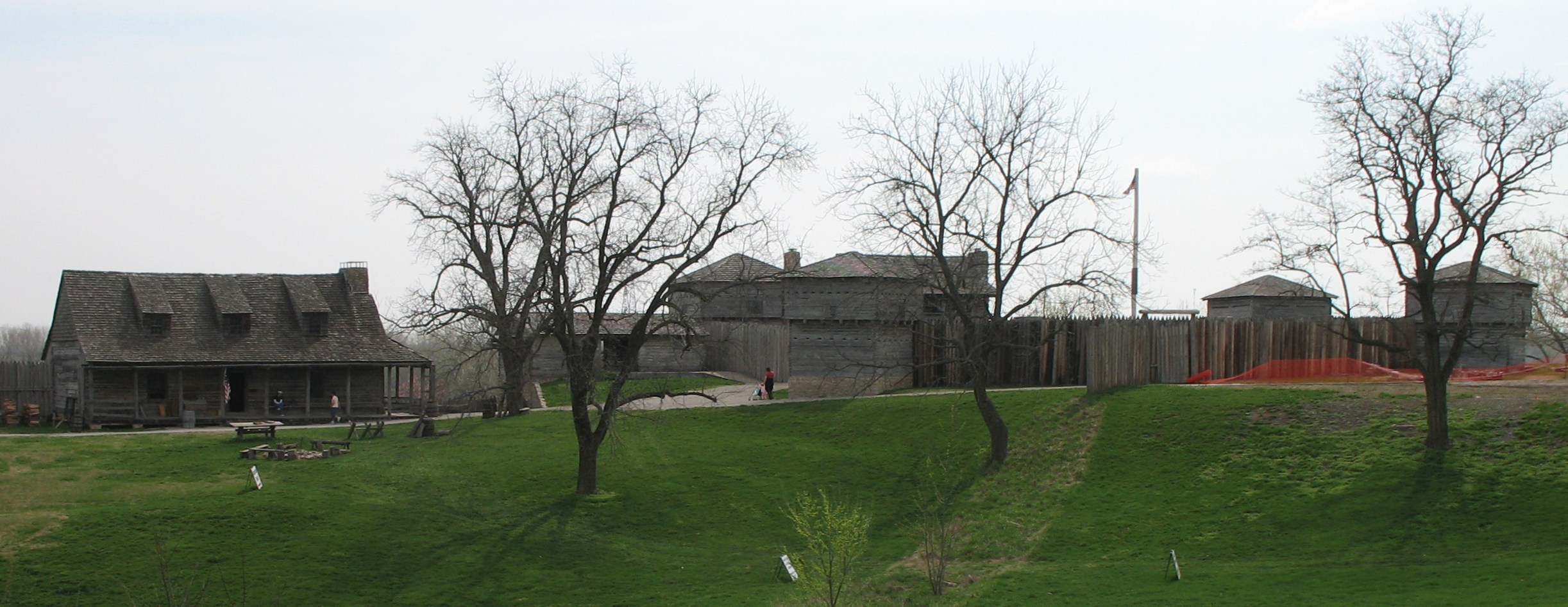
Fort Osage from the west. The "factory" trading post is on the left.

The Treaty of Fort Clark (also known as the Treaty with the Osage or the Osage Treaty) was signed at Fort Osage (then called Fort Clark) on November 10, 1808, (ratified on April 28, 1810) in which the Osage Nation ceded all the land east of the fort in Missouri and Arkansas north of the Arkansas River to the United States. The Fort Clark treaty and the Treaty of St. Louis in which the Sauk and Meskwaki ceded northeastern Missouri along with northern Illinois and southern Wisconsin were the first two major treaties in the newly acquired Louisiana Purchase. The affected tribes, upset with the terms, were to side with the British in the War of 1812. Following the settlement of that war, John C. Sullivan for the United States was to survey the ceded land in 1816 (adjusting it 23 miles (37 km) westward to the mouth of the Kansas River to create the Indian Boundary Line west of which and south of which virtually all tribes were to be removed in the Indian Removal Act in 1830.

== Background ==
When Lewis and Clark began their explorations of the Missouri River in 1804, Pierre Chouteau of the Chouteau fur trading family in St. Louis, Missouri took Osage chiefs to meet Thomas Jefferson who promised to open a government sanctioned trading post (then called the factory which the Osage could sell their goods at a government set price (ostensibly to keep them from being exploited by individual traders). The trading post would also have a blacksmith to provide utensils for the Native Americans. In September 1808, William Clark led a group to the site of Fort Osage near Sibley, Missouri where they built the fort on a bluff above the Missouri River. Pierre Chouteau went about 150 miles south to Neosho, Missouri where the Osage had their principal village on the Osage River and brought the chiefs to Fort Osage. There they were presented with the terms of the treaty.

== Terms ==
=== Ceded land ===
The treaty specifically cedes the following land:

And in consideration of the advantages which we derive from the stipulations contained in the foregoing articles, we, the chiefs and warriors of the Great and Little Osage, for ourselves and our nations respectively, covenant and agree with the United States, that the boundary line between our nations and the United States shall be as follows, to wit: beginning at fort Clark, on the Missouri, five miles above Fire Prairie, and running thence a due south course to the river Arkansas, and down the same to the Mississippi; hereby ceding and relinquishing forever to the United States, all the lands which lie east of the said line, and north of the southwardly bank of the said river Arkansas, and all lands situated northwardly of the river Missouri. And we do further cede and relinquish to the United States forever, a tract of two leagues square, to embrace fort Clark, and to be laid off in such manner as the President of the United States shall think proper.

=== Payment ===
According to the Article V, the Osage were to receive an annual payment:

Great Osage nation, the sum of eight hundred dollars [$13,559.32 today], and to the Little Osage nation, the sum of four hundred dollars[$6,779.66 today].

=== Ceded lands ===
In Article VI the lands ceded:

Beginning at fort Clark, on the Missouri, five miles above Fire Prairie, and running thence a due south course to the river Arkansas, and down the same to the Mississippi; hereby ceding and relinquishing forever to the United States, all the lands which lie east of the said line, and north of the southwardly bank of the said river Arkansas, and all lands situated northwardly of the river Missouri. And we do further cede and relinquish to the United States forever, a tract of two leagues square, to embrace fort Clark, and to be laid off in such manner as the President of the United States shall think proper.

=== Assignment to other tribes ===
Article VIII provided that the Osage land could be assigned to other tribes:

And the United States agree that such of the Great and Little Osage Indians, as may think proper to put themselves under the protection of Fort Clark, and who observe the stipulations of this treaty with good faith, shall be permitted to live and to hunt, without molestation, on all that tract of country, west of the north and south boundary line, on which they, the said Great and Little Osage, have usually hunted or resided: Provided, The same be not the hunting grounds of any nation or tribe of Indians in amity with the United States; and on any other lands within the territory of Louisiana, without the limits of the white settlements, until the United States may think proper to assign the same as hunting grounds to other friendly Indians.

== Aftermath ==
There were protests immediately from the tribe as there were claims that not all the proper representatives signed the document. The Osage for the most part did not move to Fort Osage staying instead at their home in Neosho. Some tribesmen were to side with the British in the War of 1812. After the war, the Osage were summoned to Portage Des Sioux, Missouri where they affirmed the treaty in the Treaties of Portage des Sioux in 1815.

The treaty documents were still in the possession of an Osage chief in 1870 who, suspicious of the intentions of the American delegation, was against the signing of the Drum Creek Treaty that would send them to a reservation:

I remember one Indian orator [...] got up and spoke of Treaties they had with the Great Father in Washington, in the past, and how they once owned all the land north of the Red River of the South, and west of the Mississippi, and south of the Missouri River, and, to prove that, he brought out a tin cylinder a finely engrossed Treaty, signed by President Thomas Jefferson in 1804.^{[Note]}

[...]

He then said they had lost all that land, and now they came down to take away the last land they had.

— John V. Farwell, Jr., who witnessed this speech as an 11-year old

^{Note} He was referring to the Treaty of Fort Clark of 1808, but since the signed document was from 1804, it was from the time in which Lewis and Clark brought Osage chiefs to meet President Jefferson, the legendary Great Father. Commissioners determined that the elaborate "treaty" was signed by the Secretary of War in 1804, Henry Dearborn.

== See also ==
- Osage Treaty (disambiguation), several treaties
- List of treaties
- Lovely's Purchase
