= Treaty of Chicago (disambiguation) =

The Treaty of Chicago primarily refers two treaties that were signed between the US government and Native Americans:

- 1821 Treaty of Chicago
- 1833 Treaty of Chicago

Treaty of Chicago may also refer to:

- Convention on International Civil Aviation, also known as the Chicago Convention which established the International Civil Aviation Organization (ICAO), a specialized agency of the United Nations charged with coordinating and regulating international air travel.
