= Fourth Treaty of Prairie du Chien =

1830 treaty between the United States and Native Americans

The fourth Treaty of Prairie du Chien was negotiated between the United States and the Sauk and Meskwaki, the Mdewakanton, Wahpekute and Sisseton Sioux, Omaha, Ioway, Otoe and Missouria peoples. The treaty was signed on July 15, 1830, with William Clark and Willoughby Morgan representing the United States. Through additional negotiations conducted in St. Louis on October 13, 1830, Yankton Sioux and Santee Sioux agreed to abide by the 1830 Treaty of Prairie du Chien. The US government announced the treaty and its numerous adherents on February 24, 1831.

In this treaty, the tribes agreed to land cession of three large tracts of land: two strips of land 20 miles wide each on either side of the boundary established by the first (1825) Treaty of Prairie du Chien (roughly from La Crosse, Wisconsin to Prairie du Chien, Wisconsin), extending from the Mississippi River to the Des Moines River in what today is southeastern Minnesota and northeastern Iowa; and a large triangular tract of land in southeastern Nebraska and northwestern Missouri, western Iowa and southern Minnesota, from Kansas City, Missouri due north to the Des Moines River, to the area about Spirit Lake, Iowa to Worthington, Minnesota, down Rock River, down the Missouri River and back to Kansas City. Additional tribes later ceded the large triangular tract as the Platte Purchase in 1836.

The treaty also established the Nemaha Half-Breed Reservation, which provided land in southeastern Nebraska to the mixed-race descendants of European/American fur trappers and their Native American women companions from several involved tribes. Without this provision, the mixed-race descendants were often kept from being allocated land on newly established reservations, and were caught between cultures.

== See also ==
- Native American tribes in Nebraska
- Treaty of St. Louis (1804)
- Treaty of St. Louis (1816)
- Treaty of St. Louis (1818)
- Treaty of St. Louis (1825)
- Treaty of Chicago
