= Playing Fox =

Chief of the Fox tribe

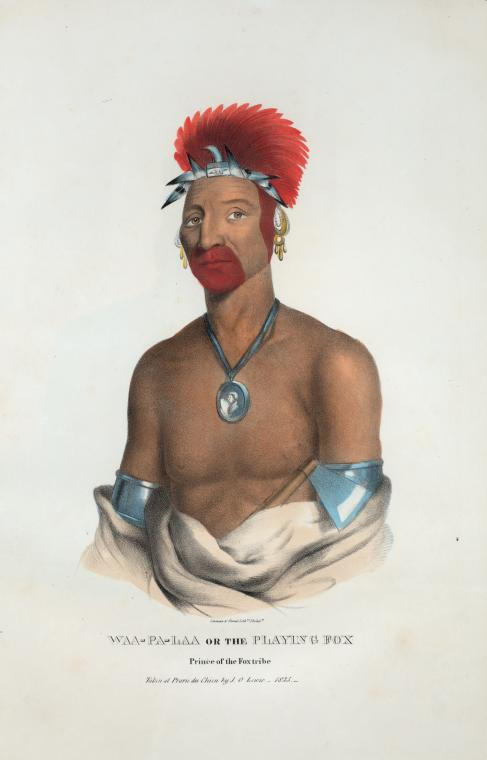
A portrait of Playing Fox (1825) by James Otto Lewis

Playing Fox (Waa-pa-laa) was a chief of the Fox tribe of the Meskwaki people. His portrait was taken in Prairie du Chien in 1825 by James Otto Lewis, and included in The Aboriginal Port Folio.

== See also ==
- First Treaty of Prairie du Chien
