= Sioux Treaty =

Sioux Treaty may refer to:

- Treaties of Portage des Sioux, a series of treaties at Portage des Sioux, Missouri in 1815
- Treaty of Traverse des Sioux, an agreement between the United States government and Sioux Indian bands in Minnesota Territory
- Sioux Treaty of 1868, an agreement between the United States government and the Lakota, Yanktonai Dakota and Arapaho Nations
