= Treaty of St. Louis (1816) =

Treaty between the U.S. and Native American tribes

The Treaty of St. Louis of 1816 was treaty signed by Ninian Edwards, William Clark, and Auguste Chouteau for the United States and representatives of the Council of Three Fires (united tribes of Ottawa, Ojibwa, and Potawatomi) residing on the Illinois and Milwaukee rivers, signed on August 24, 1816, and proclaimed on December 30, 1816. Despite the name, the treaty was conducted at Portage des Sioux, Missouri, located immediately north of St. Louis, Missouri.

Overall, 14 different treaties known as the Treaty of St. Louis, all signed in the vicinity of St. Louis, Missouri, were established between the United States and various native tribes from 1804 through 1824.

In the 1816 Treaty of St. Louis, the tribes, their chiefs, and their warriors relinquished all right, claim, and title to land previously ceded to the United States by the Sac and Fox tribes on November 3, 1804 in the 1804 Treaty of St. Louis. The united tribes also ceded to the United States a 20-mile strip of land that connected Lake Michigan with the Illinois River. This ceded land would later be used to create the Illinois and Michigan Canal in 1848 and about 50 years later the Chicago Sanitary and Ship Canal.

The specific land given up is included in Article 1 of the treaty:

The said chiefs and warriors, for themselves and the tribes they represent, agree to relinquish, and hereby do relinquish, to the United States, all their right, claim, and title, to all the land contained in the before-mentioned cession of the Sacs and Foxes, which lies south of a due west line from the southern extremity of Lake Michigan to the Mississippi river. And they moreover cede to the United States all the land contained within the following bounds, to wit: beginning on the left bank of the Fox river of Illinois, ten miles above the mouth of said Fox river; thence running so as to cross Sandy creek, ten miles above its mouth; thence, in a direct line, to a point ten miles north of the west end of the Portage, between Chicago creek, which empties into Lake Michigan, and the river Depleines, a fork of the Illinois; thence, in a direct line, to a point on Lake Michigan, ten miles northward of the mouth of Chicago creek; thence, along the lake, to a point ten miles southward of the mouth of the said Chicago creek; thence, in a direct line, to a point on the Kankakee, ten miles above its mouth; thence, with the said Kankakee and the Illinois river, to the mouth of Fox river, and thence to the beginning: Provided, nevertheless, That the said tribes shall be permitted to hunt and fish within the limits of the land hereby relinquished and ceded, so long as it may continue to be the property of the United States.

In exchange the tribes were to be paid $1,000 in merchandise over 12 years. The land was surveyed by John C. Sullivan and its land was originally intended as land grant rewards for volunteers in the War of 1812.

== Commemoration and evidence of the treaty today ==
Evidence of the boundaries established by the 1816 Treaty of St. Louis can be found around Chicagoland, in road names and routes, in park names, and on historical markers.

Some diagonal roads north and west of Chicago line up with the northern boundary established by the 1816 treaty, including two sections of Rogers Avenue, one in the Rogers Park neighborhood and another bordering the Sauganash and North Park neighborhoods; Forest Preserve Drive on Chicago's northwest side; and short Indian Boundary Roads in suburban River Grove, near Grand Avenue, and Melrose Park, near North Avenue. Also, Indian Boundary Line Road in Plainfield lines up with the treaty's southern border.

Several parks have Indian Boundary in their name as well. Indian Boundary Park in the West Ridge neighborhood of Chicago is named in commemoration of the treaty. Meanwhile other "Indian Boundary" parks can also be found along the treaty's southern boundaries, in southwest suburban Bolingbrook, Midlothian and Frankfort.

Two historical markers are found at the Indian Boundary Park in West Ridge, one about the 1816 treaty and one about the native tribes who lived in the area prior to the treaty. Another marker from Chicago's 1937 Charter Jubilee can be found on a building at the intersection of Rogers Avenue and Clark Street with this text: "Clark Street honors George Rogers Clark, whose brother, William Clark, with Ninian Edwards and Auguste Chouteau, in 1816 negotiated Indian treaty ceding land including Chicago site from Rogers Avenue to Lake Calumet."

In suburban Oak Brook on the Mayslake Peabody Estate, a marker details the treaty, whose northern boundary cut through the area nearby, and includes a map of the Chicago region in the context of the treaty. Southwest of there in Downers Grove, a historical marker about the treaty's boundary lines can be found in front of the Downers Grove Museum.

== See also ==
- Osage Treaty (disambiguation), several treaties
- List of treaties
- Indian Boundary Park - Chicago
- First Treaty of Prairie du Chien
- Second Treaty of Prairie du Chien
- Third Treaty of Prairie du Chien
- Fourth Treaty of Prairie du Chien
- Treaty of Chicago
