= Osage Treaty (1825) =

1825 treaty between the United States and Osage

The Osage Treaty (also known as the Treaty with the Osage) was signed in St. Louis, Missouri, on June 2, 1825, between William Clark on behalf of the United States and members of the Osage Nation. It contained 14 articles. It was a follow-up to the Treaty of St. Louis (1818) that had ceded a relatively small amount of land in modern-day Arkansas and Oklahoma.

== Terms of the agreement ==
The Osage ceded a large area of land to the United States government for cash and annuity payments. According to the first article of the treaty, the territories ceded entailed lands lying within and west of both the State of Missouri and the Territory of Arkansas, lands lying north and west of the Red River, all territories south and east of the Kansas River. These areas later encompassed nearly the entire states of Kansas and Oklahoma, plus strips of land on the western edges of Missouri and Arkansas. The accord was proclaimed on December 30, 1825.

== Location near White Hair Village or Town ==
The treaty further established an Osage Reservation in what became southern Kansas. It was based on the location of White Hair's village on the Verdigris River, the location of which was subject to some controversy in subsequent years when the borders of the Osage Reservation had to be established. Louis F. Burns, an Osage language speaker and author located the village on the west side of the Neosho River west of Shaw, Kansas, which coincides with the position established by Abel's discovery of a letter by G.J. Endicott. "The village was known as White Hair's Town and contained eight log houses and 100 bark and grass houses."

The Osage Reservation was established by this treaty. Its boundaries, based on the location of White Hair Village, also established the western boundary of the Cherokee Neutral Land. A Presbyterian camp called Boudinot Mission was built a little east of White Hair Village around 1830 near the mouth of Four Mile Creek, as shown on early maps.

The Cherokee Neutral Land had been considered a buffer between the then-hostile Osages and the State of Missouri and ended up with very few inhabitants until the Cherokee ceded it and sold to James Frederick Joy.

== See also ==
- Treaty of St. Louis (1818)
- Drum Creek Treaty of 1868/1870
- Fort Smith Council (which included the Canville Treaty of 1865)
- Osage Treaty (disambiguation)

== Sources ==
- Oklahoma State University Library (Kappler Project: Indian Affairs: Laws and Treaties) - Treaty With The Osage, 1825
