= Orchard Farm High School =

American high school in Missouri

Location
- 2555 Highway B St. Charles, Missouri; United States; 38°50′36″N 90°28′42″W

Information
- Type: Public secondary
- Established: April 20, 1959
- School district: Orchard Farm School District
- Principal: Greg Jones
- Teaching staff: 39.35 (FTE)
- Grades: 9–12
- Enrollment: 685 (2023–24)
- Student to teacher ratio: 17.41
- Colors: Green and white
- Nickname: Eagles
- Website: ofsd.k12.mo.us/schools/orchard_farm_high_school

Orchard Farm High School is a public high school in St. Charles, Missouri that is part of the Orchard Farm School District. The school serves the towns of West Alton and Portage Des Sioux as well as parts of the city of St. Charles and St. Charles County.

== Location ==
Orchard Farm High School is located approximately 7 miles north of Highway 370 along Highway 94. OFHS serves students from St. Charles, Orchard Farm, Portage Des Sioux, West Alton, Machens and Black Walnut. The district covers approximately 125 square miles.

== History ==
The school district was created on February 14, 1959, having combined 15 smaller schools into what was previously the St. Charles R-V School District.

Orchard Farm football field was destroyed in the Great Flood of 1993. Prince Henri of Luxembourg was visiting and donated money to rebuild the field. The field afterwards was named Luxembourg Field in his honor.

The Orchard Farm Elementary School, the Orchard Farm Middle School, and the Orchard Farm High School are on the original campus, while Discovery Elementary School, at 500 Discovery Path Lane, opened in late 2010. The Early Learning Center, at 3489 Boschertown Road, opened in August 2016.

In 2017, the Orchard Farm School District earned 100% on the state's APR. For two consecutive years, the Orchard Farm School District was named in the Top Five for Mid-Sized Companies by the St. Louis Post Dispatch.
