= The Aboriginal Port Folio =

Book by James Otto Lewis

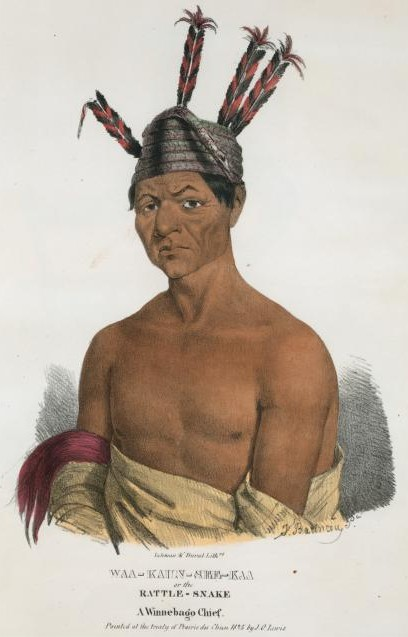
- Waukon Decorah lithograph from The Aboriginal Portfolio
- Author: James Otto Lewis
- Publication date: 1835-1836

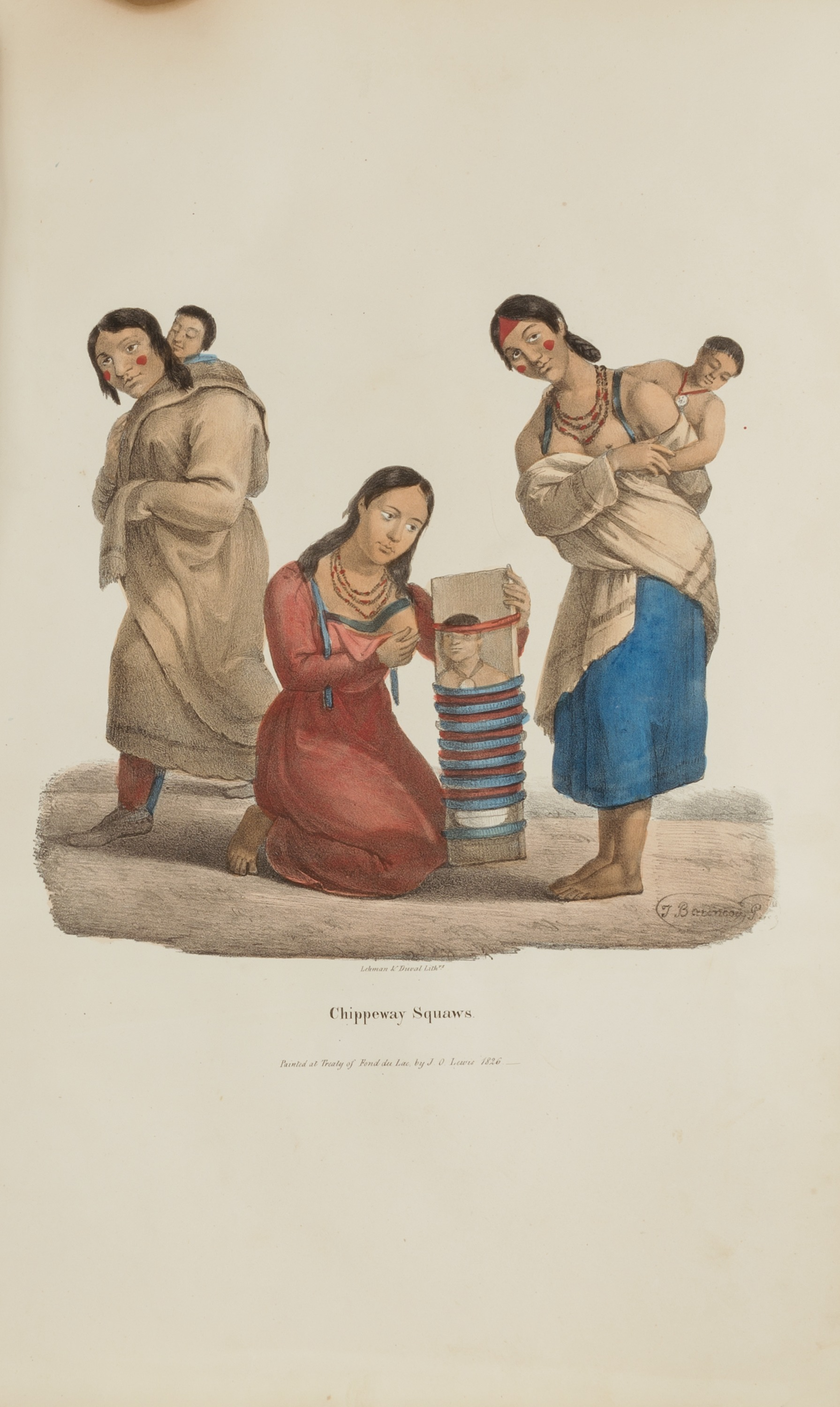
'Chippeway Squaws'

The Aboriginal Portfolio is an early 19th-century book of hand-colored lithographs of chiefs of Native American tribes. It represents the first important pictorial representation of Native American life.

It was published in Philadelphia in 1835-1836 by James Otto Lewis. Lewis, under commission from the Bureau of Indian Affairs, attended Native American treaty ceremonies between 1825 and 1828 and drew pictures of the tribal chiefs attending those ceremonies. The majority of drawings were from following treaty ceremonies:

- The First Treaty of Prairie du Chien, signed in August 1825 in Prairie du Chien, Wisconsin
- Treaty with the Potawatomi, signed October 16, 1826 in Mississinewa, Indiana (see Treaty of Mississinewa)
- Treaty with the Miami, signed October 23, 1826 in Fort Wayne, Indiana
- Treaty with the Chippewa, etc., signed 1827 in Butte des Morts, Wisconsin

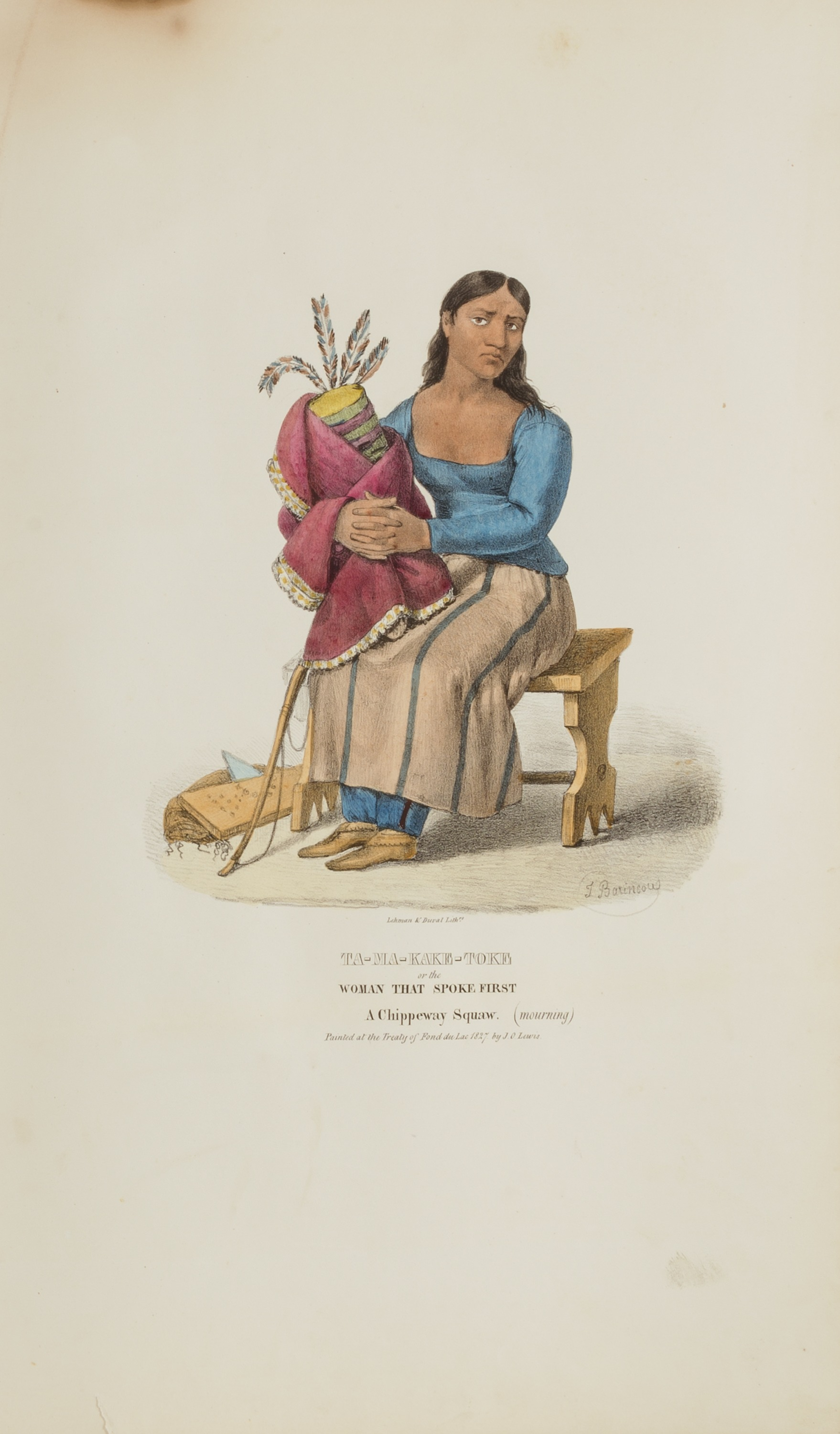
'Ta-Ma-Kake-Toke, or the Woman That Spoke First: A Chippeway Squaw'

In addition to drawings of tribal chiefs, scenes of the Prairie du Chien and Butte des Morts treaty grounds were drawn, as well as a drawing of a Chippewa pipe dance and tomahawk dance.

Lewis also made a journey to Fond du Lac in the summer of 1846 and made drawings there.

The earliest painting included is dated 1823, and the latest 1833. None of the original paintings survive. Most paintings were sketched on location and finished in Detroit between 1827 and 1833. Lithography was done by Lehman and Duval in Philadelphia; color was washed in by hand. Some portraits are signed J. Barincou; this is the likely lithographer.

== People depicted in the book ==
- Waukon Decorah
- Playing Fox
