= Abel C. Pepper =

American politician

Colonel Abel Claypole Pepper
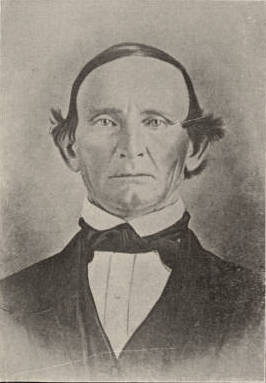

Member of the Indiana House of Representatives

Member of the Indiana House of Representatives
- In office 1825–1826
- In office 1836–1837

Personal details
- Born: April 20, 1793 Virginia, U.S.
- Died: March 20, 1860 (aged 66) Rising Sun, Indiana, U.S.

Military service
- Allegiance: United States
- Branch/service: United States Army; Indiana Militia
- Rank: Brigadier general
- Battles/wars: War of 1812

Abel Claypole Pepper (April 20, 1793 – March 20, 1860) was an American politician, law enforcement officer, and Indian agent. During his long career in government service, Pepper oversaw the removal of American Indians in Indiana, Illinois, Michigan and Wisconsin on behalf of the United States Department of War, signing treaties with Indigenous peoples, which eventually resulted in the Potawatomi Trail of Death. He served in the Indiana House of Representatives three times and was a United States Marshal.

== Early life and education ==
Abel Claypole Pepper was born in Virginia on April 20, 1793. Pepper moved to Kentucky and served as a private in the War of 1812 with the Kentucky volunteer light dragoons. He was honorably discharged in 1813. Pepper first pursued a career in medicine, interning at a doctor's office. He changed his career path after incorrectly prescribing the wrong medication to a patient. He started studying law and represented, unlicensed, a local farmer in court. Pepper failed to win the case for the client. He stopped pursuing law. In 1816, Pepper moved to Rising Sun, Indiana. In 1820, he married Jane Haff. They had four children together.

== Life and career ==
After relocating to Rising Sun, Pepper became active in the community. He became the County Commissioner of Dearborn County. He joined the Indiana Militia, in which he earned the rank of colonel and brigadier general. He used the title of colonel, regardless of his higher rank. Pepper served his first term in the Indiana House of Representatives in 1825, followed by a second term in 1826. He ran for Lieutenant-Governor in 1828, running against Milton Stapp. Pepper lost the election by "a few hundred votes."

In 1829, Pepper was appointed by Andrew Jackson in Fort Wayne, Indiana to the United States Department of War as a sub-Indian agent, focused on the removal of American Indians in Illinois, Indiana, Michigan and Wisconsin. Eventually, he was named superintendent. During his time as an Indian agent, he negotiated nine treaties between the Potawatomies, with he Potawatomies handing selective land plots over to the state and settlers, including the Treaty of Turkey Creek Prairie. Those Potawatomies that did not leave their land within the two years agreed to in the treaties were forced to evacuate, resulting in the Potawatomi Trail of Death.

In 1836, he returned to the Indiana House of Representatives to serve a third and final term. He resigned from his position with the Department of War in 1839.

Pepper became director of the Bank of Indiana in 1842. Pepper ran for the position against fellow representative William Andrews. The House of Representatives voted five times, with the final vote giving Pepper the majority (51 votes) over Andrews (46 votes). After the one-year term expired, Pepper was voted again, unanimously, as director. In 1844, he served as the sheriff and Sinking Fund Commissioner of Dearborn County, Indiana. After his tenure, he was appointed by President James K. Polk a United States marshal, serving from 1845 until 1849.

Pepper was a freemason, serving as a Grand Master and Grand High Priest. He was also a member of the Knights Templar.

== Later life and death ==
Pepper was a member of the Indiana Constitutional Commission in 1850. He represented Ohio and Switzerland Counties.

He died at home on March 20, 1860, in Rising Sun. He is buried in Rising Sun.

== Legacy ==
Pepper's papers are held in the collection of the Indiana State Library.
