= Prairie du Chien =

Prairie du Chien may refer to:

== Places ==
- Prairie du Chien, Wisconsin, USA; a city in Crawford County enclosed by the larger town of Prairie du Chien
- Prairie du Chien (town), Wisconsin, USA; a township in Crawford County that surrounds the city of Prairie du Chien
- Prairie du Chien Municipal Airport, Crawford County, Wisconsin, USA
- Prairie du Chien Area School District, Wisconsin, USA

== Other uses ==
- Prairie du Chien (play), a 1979 play by David Mamet

== See also ==
- Battle of Prairie du Chien, a battle during the War of 1812
- Treaty of Prairie du Chien (disambiguation)
