= Treaty of St. Louis (1818) =

1818 treaties between the United States and Native Americans

The Treaty of St. Louis is the name of a series of treaties signed between the United States and various Native American tribes from 1804 through 1824. The fourteen treaties were all signed in the St. Louis, Missouri area.

The Treaty of St. Louis (also known as the Treaty with the Osage or the Osage Treaty) was signed on September 25, 1818, in St. Louis between William Clark of the United States and members of the Osage Nation. Based on the terms of the accord, the Osage ceded all territories to the United States beginning at the Arkansas River and ending at the Verdigris River. The specifications of the lands ceded to the United States are found in Article 1 of the accord:

Whereas, the Osage nations have been embarrassed by the frequent demands for property taken from citizens of the United States, by war parties, and other thoughtless men of their several bands, (both before and since their war with the Cherokees) and as the exertions of their chiefs have been ineffectual in recovering and delivering such property, conformably with the condition of the ninth article of a treaty, entered into with the United States at Fort Clark, the tenth of November, one thousand eight hundred and eight; and as the deductions from their annuities, in conformity to the said article, would deprive them of any for several years, and being destitute of funds to do that justice to the citizens of the United States, which is calculated to prompt a friendly intercourse, they have agreed, and do hereby agree, to cede to the United States, and forever quit claim to the tract of country included within the following bounds, to-wit: Beginning at the Arkansaw River, at where the present Osage boundary line strikes the river at Frog Bayou; then up the Arkansaw and Verdigris to the fall of Verdigris river; thence, eastwardly, to the said Osage boundary line at a point twenty leagues north from the Arkansaw river; and, with that line, to the place of beginning.

== See also ==
- Osage Treaty (disambiguation), several treaties
- List of treaties
- Indian Boundary Park - Chicago
- First Treaty of Prairie du Chien
- Second Treaty of Prairie du Chien
- Third Treaty of Prairie du Chien
- Fourth Treaty of Prairie du Chien
- Treaty of Chicago
