= Orchard Farm School District =

School district in Missouri, U.S.

Address
- 3489 Boschertown Road St. Charles, Missouri, 63301; United States
- Coordinates: 38°49′47″N 90°28′38″W

District information
- Established: February 14, 1959; 67 years ago
- NCES District ID: 2923160

Students and staff
- Students: 2,154 (2020-2021)
- Staff: 140.10 (on an FTE basis)
- Student–teacher ratio: 15.37

Other information
- Website: www.ofsd.k12.mo.us

The Orchard Farm School District is a public school district in St. Charles County, Missouri that was formed on February 14, 1959. The schools in the Orchard Farm and Portage Des Sioux area decided to come together and form one district. There are three schools on the Orchard Farm campus. An additional school is located north of Highway 370 in St. Charles, Missouri. In August 2016, the Early Learning Center opened and now serves approximately 150 preschool students. The school district serves approximately 2,100 students, in northern portions of St. Charles, West Alton, and Portage Des Sioux. The school mascot is an eagle and the school colors are green and white.

The administrators for the Orchard Farm School District are as follows: Superintendent, Dr. Wade Steinhoff; Orchard Farm High School Principal, Dr. Greg Jones; Orchard Farm Middle School Principal, Dr. Michelle Geringer; Orchard Farm Elementary Principal, Dr. Jerry Oetting; Discovery Elementary Principal, Dr. Luke Dix

The district has been Accredited with Distinction for numerous years and earned a St. Louis Top Workplace for four consecutive years.

== Schools ==
=== Elementary School(s) ===
Orchard Farm Elementary School

Discovery Elementary School

Orchard Farm Early Learning Center

=== Middle School(s) ===
Orchard Farm Middle School

=== Junior High School(s) ===
Orchard Farm Junior High School

=== High School(s) ===
Orchard Farm High School
