= Treaty of Tippecanoe =

1832 treaty between the United States and Potawatomi

- Type: Land purchase
- Signed: October 26, 1832
- Location: near Rochester, Indiana
- Condition: Transfer of money and goods to natives
- Parties: United States of America; Pottawatomie
- Language: English

The Treaty of Tippecanoe was an agreement between the United States government and Native American Potawatomi tribes in Indiana on October 26, 1832.

== Treaty ==
On October 26, 1832, the United States government entered negotiations with the Native American tribes of north-western Indiana seeking to purchase their land for white settlement. The United States was represented by three commissioners, former Governor of Indiana Jonathan Jennings, John Wesley Davis and Marks Crume. The United States had already purchased the Miami claim to the region in a previous treaty, and the Pottawatomie were the only natives who still held a claim in the region. The land purchased was most of the northwestern part of the state of Indiana. It was recorded in the treaty as:

beginning at a point on Lake Michigan, where the line dividing the States of Indiana and Illinois intersects the saline thence with the margin of said Lake, to the intersection of the southern boundary of a cession made by the Pottawatomie, at the treaty of the Wabash, of eighteen hundred and twenty-six; thence east, to the northwest corner of the cession made by the treaty of St. Joseph's, in eighteen hundred and twenty-eight; thence south ten miles; thence with the Indian boundary line to the Michigan road; thence south with said road to the northern boundary line, air designated in the treaty of eighteen hundred and twenty-six, with the Pottawatomie; thence west with the Indian boundary line to the river Tippecanoe; thence with the Indian boundary line, as established by the treaty of eighteen hundred and eighteen, at St. Mary's to the line dividing the States of Indiana and Illinois; and thence north, with the line dividing the said States, to the place of beginning.

The treaty provided for establishing a reserve for the Pottawatomie along the Yellow River, and to build a mill for them on that reservation. In exchange for the land, the Potawatomi tribe was granted an annual payment of $20,000 (USD) for a term of twenty years. Upon signing the treaty, the tribe was also granted $100,000 in goods, and a lump sum payment of $62,412 for payment of debts owed by the Potawatomi. The government also offered the tribes assistance in moving to new lands in Indian Territory, and providing farming implements to assist them in cultivating the land they would move to.

The native tribes agreed, and the following tribal leaders signed the treaty with an X mark: Louison, Che-ehaw-eose, Banack, Man-o-quett, Kin-kosh, Pee-shee-Nvaw-no, Menominee, Mis-sah-kaw-way, Kee-waw-nay, Sen-bo-go, Che-quaw-ma-eaw-co, Muak-kose, Ah-you-way, Po-kah-kause, So-po tie, Newark, Che-man, No-taw-kah, Nas-waw-kee, Pec-pin-a-paw, Ma-ehe-saw, O-kitch-ehee, Pee-pish-kah, conl-mo-yo, Chiek-kose, Mis-qua buck, Mo-tie-ah, Muck-ka-tah-mo-tvay, Mah-qusw-shee, O-sheh-weh, Mah-zick, Queh-kah-pah, Quash-quaw, Louisor Perish, Pam-bo-go, Bee-ya w-yo, Pah-ciss, Mauck-eo-pavv-waw, Mis-sah-qua, Kawk, Miee-kiss, Shaw-bo, Aub-be-naub-bee, Mau-maut-wah, O-ka-mause, Pash-ee-po, We-wiss-lai, Ash-kom, and Waw-zee-o-nes.

== See also ==
- Indian removals in Indiana
- History of Indiana

== Sources ==
- Kappler, Charles Joseph (1903). Indian Affairs By United States. Government Printing Office.
