= Portage Des Sioux, Missouri =

- City
- Location of Portage Des Sioux, Missouri

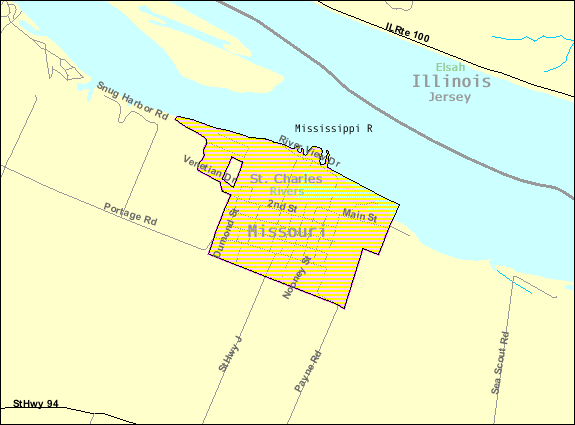
- U.S. Census map
- Coordinates: 38°55′35″N 90°20′35″W
- Country: United States
- State: Missouri
- County: St. Charles

Area
  - Total: 0.68 sq mi (1.75 km^{2})
  - Land: 0.58 sq mi (1.49 km^{2})
  - Water: 0.10 sq mi (0.26 km^{2})
- Elevation: 433 ft (132 m)

Population (2020)
  - Total: 335
  - Density: 582.4/sq mi (224.85/km^{2})
- Time zone: UTC-6 (Central (CST))
  - Summer (DST): UTC-5 (CDT)
- ZIP code: 63373
- Area code: 636
- FIPS code: 29-59150
- GNIS feature ID: 0756547

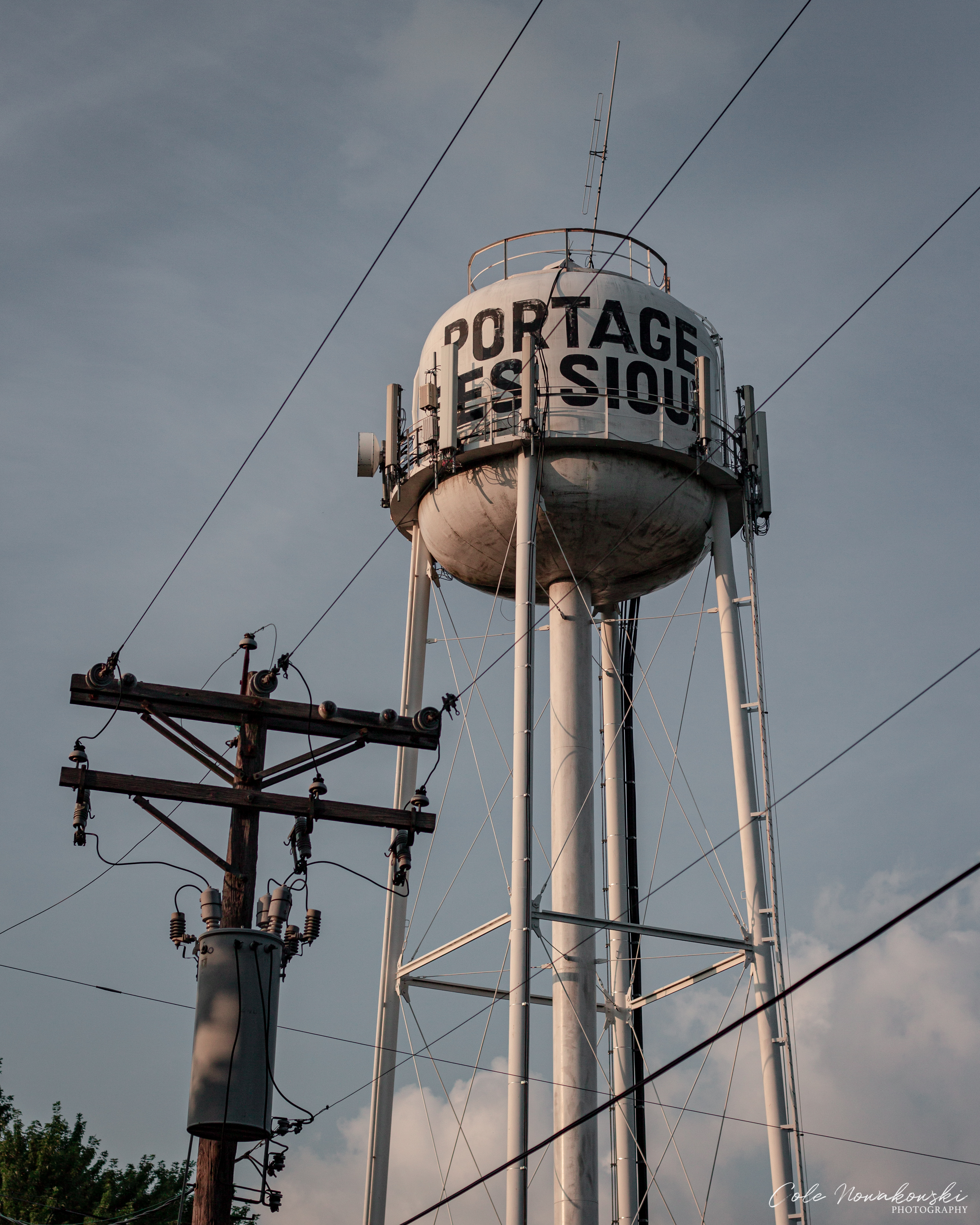
This water tower provides potable water to the town of Portage Des Sioux in St. Charles, Missouri.

Portage Des Sioux (/ˈpɔːrtɪdʒ də ˈsuː/ POR-tij duh SOO) is a city in St. Charles County, Missouri, United States. The town sits on the Mississippi River roughly opposite Elsah, Illinois, and is the home of the riverside shrine of Our Lady of the Rivers. As of the 2020 census, Portage Des Sioux had a population of 335. The city was founded in 1799 by Spanish Lt. Gov. Zenon Trudeau and François Saucier in reaction to American plans to build a military post about twelve miles (19 km) downstream. The French name derives from the overland escape route between the Missouri River and Mississippi River used by a band of Sioux, fleeing enemies; they used this area as a portage for their canoes, outdistancing their rivals who instead paddled all of the way to the confluence of the rivers.

The Treaties of Portage des Sioux in 1815 were signed here ostensibly settling Native American and United States conflicts in the War of 1812. The treaties consolidated and affirmed the Treaty of St. Louis (1804) in which the Sauk and Meskwaki ceding northeast Missouri and much of Illinois and Wisconsin and the 1808 Treaty of Fort Clark in which the Osage Nation ceded all of Missouri and Arkansas. These treaties were to ultimately result in the Black Hawk War and the tribes being forced to move west of Missouri.

== Geography ==
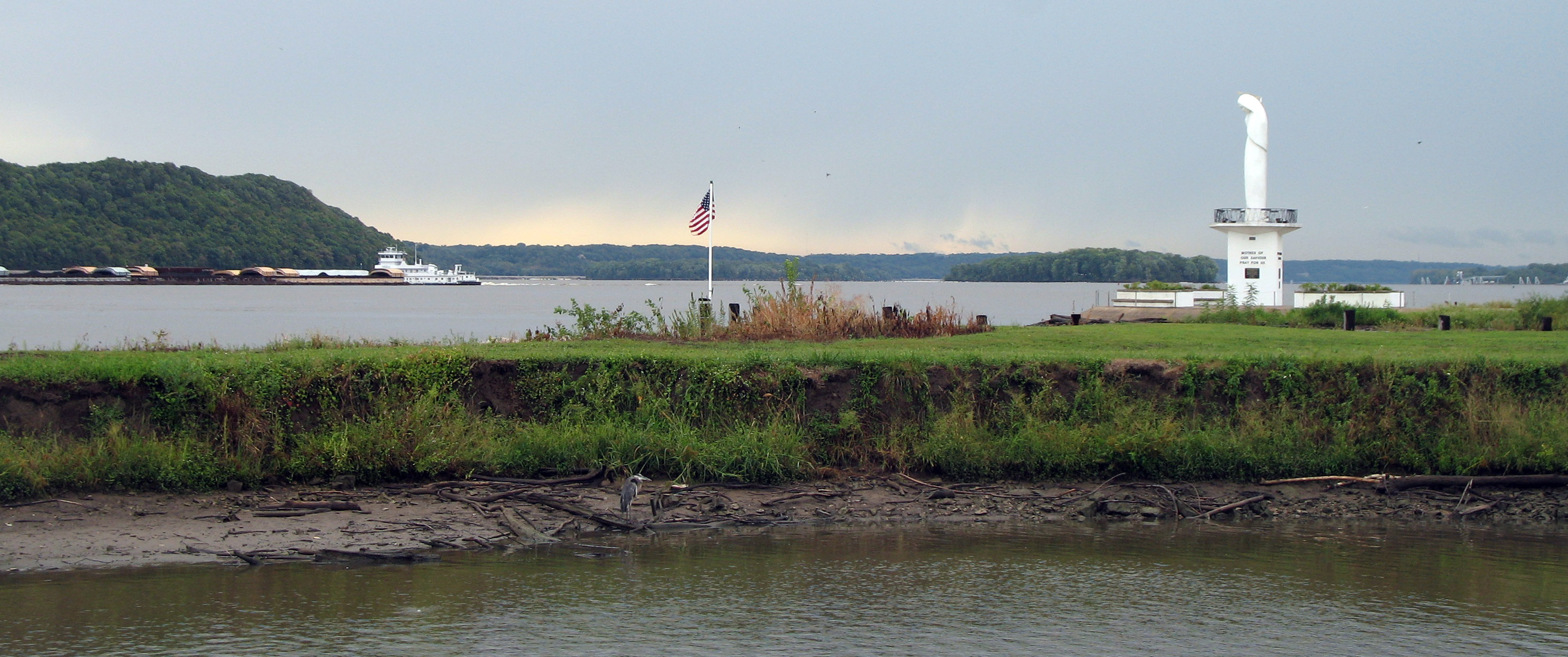
Our Lady of the Rivers

According to the United States Census Bureau, the city has a total area of 0.53 square miles (1.37 km^{2}), of which 0.45 square miles (1.17 km^{2}) is land and 0.08 square miles (0.21 km^{2}) is water.

== Demographics ==
Historical population
Census	Pop.	Note	%±
1860	98		—
1870	160		63.3%
1880	225		40.6%
1900	242		—
1910	218		−9.9%
1920	283		29.8%
1930	248		−12.4%
1940	254		2.4%
1950	264		3.9%
1960	371		40.5%
1970	509		37.2%
1980	488		−4.1%
1990	503		3.1%
2000	351		−30.2%
2010	328		−6.6%
2020	335		2.1%
U.S. Decennial Census

As of 2000 the median income for a household in the city was $38,333, and the median income for a family was $42,321. Males had a median income of $41,875 versus $25,000 for females. The per capita income for the city was $18,693. About 2.8% of families and 2.3% of the population were below the poverty line, including 4.0% of those under age 18 and none of those age 65 or over.

=== 2010 census ===
As of the census of 2010, there were 328 people, 136 households, and 90 families residing in the city. The population density was 728.9 inhabitants per square mile (281.4/km^{2}). There were 166 housing units at an average density of 368.9 per square mile (142.4/km^{2}). The racial makeup of the city was 98.5% White, 0.6% from other races, and 0.9% from two or more races. Hispanic or Latino of any race were 1.8% of the population.

There were 136 households, of which 28.7% had children under the age of 18 living with them, 52.2% were married couples living together, 7.4% had a female householder with no husband present, 6.6% had a male householder with no wife present, and 33.8% were non-families. 31.6% of all households were made up of individuals, and 9.5% had someone living alone who was 65 years of age or older. The average household size was 2.41 and the average family size was 3.02.

The median age in the city was 44.3 years. 22% of residents were under the age of 18; 7.6% were between the ages of 18 and 24; 21.3% were from 25 to 44; 38.8% were from 45 to 64; and 10.4% were 65 years of age or older. The gender makeup of the city was 51.2% male and 48.8% female.

== Education ==
Public education in Portage Des Sioux is administered by the Orchard Farm School District.

Portage Des Sioux had a public library, a branch of the St. Charles City-County District Library. It closed after flooding in 2019.
