= James Otto Lewis =

American painter (1799–1858)

- Born: February 3, 1799; Philadelphia, Pennsylvania
- Died: November 2, 1858 (aged 59); New York City, New York
- Known for: Painting
- Notable work: The Aboriginal Port Folio, 1835-1836
- Spouse: Sophia Peltier

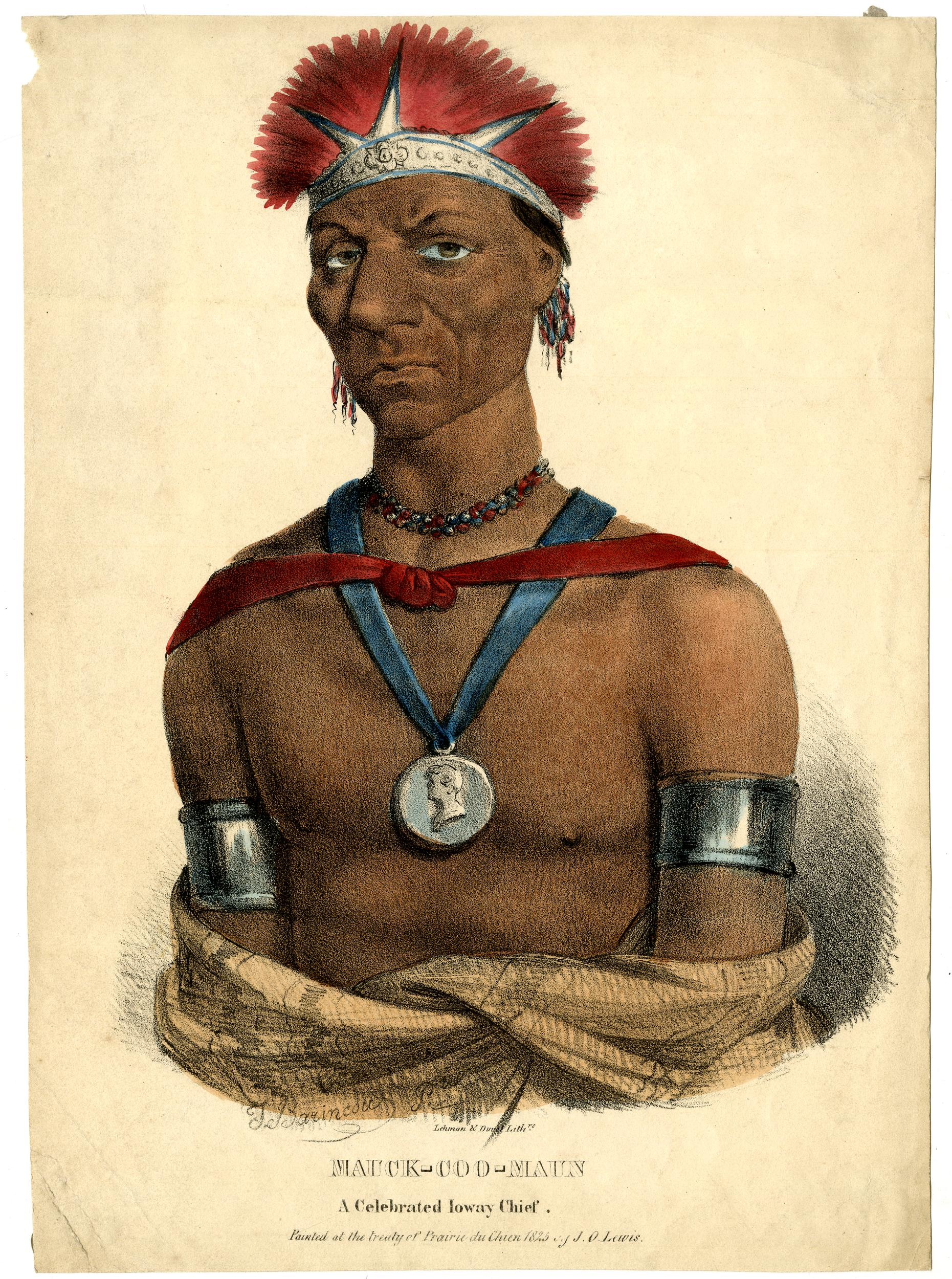
Portrait of Ioway chief Mauck-Coo-Maun, painted at the 1825 Treaty of Prairie du Chien

James Otto Lewis (February 3, 1799 – November 2, 1858) was an American engraver and painter who was noted for his portraits of Native American leaders and other figures of the American frontier. Lewis began his engraving career in Philadelphia about 1815.

From 1819 to at least 1834, Lewis worked in the west, what was then Michigan Territory, including present-day states of Indiana and Wisconsin. For eleven years of that time, he was working for the Bureau of Indian Affairs, then within the War Department, to make portraits of Native Americans. He published copies of his work in The Aboriginal Port Folio in Philadelphia, between 1835 and 1836.

== Biography ==
Lewis was born in Philadelphia, Pennsylvania, in 1799. He grew up learning to draw, paint, and make engravings.

Fascinated by what he learned of the western territories, as a young man he went west in 1819 and began traveling with Gov. Lewis Cass of the Michigan Territory. From 1823 to 1834, Lewis worked for the U.S. Government to paint official portraits of Indians, in what was an effort to preserve a record of their leaders and what was believed to be a vanishing culture.

In this official role during the 1820s, Lewis attended numerous Indian treaties and ceremonies held in Indiana and Wisconsin, where he began to make portraits of many of the participants. In 1826 Thomas L. McKenney, who was superintendent of Indian Affairs, then in the War Department, accompanied Gov. Cass on one of the official trips into this area. He relied on Lewis as the artist to create a record of the trip.

McKenney published an official record of his expedition, Sketches of a Tour to the Lakes... (1827); it contained 29 engraved or illustrated images. Although Lewis is not credited on any of the plates, the majority of images appear to be by him: his work has been identified by both the many references to it in the text and by analysis of the style of these images.

During the 1827 trip which Lewis and Cass took to Lake Michigan to negotiate with the Winnebago and Chippewa tribes, the artist sketched 25 portraits at the treaty meetings at Prairie du Chien. Of the 80 plates published in his final Aboriginal Port Folia (1835-1836), 9 were sketched at Fort Wayne (fort), in present-day Indiana; 13 at Green Bay, Wisconsin; 12 at Fond du Lac, 12 from "Massinnewa" (from the 1826 expedition), and the remaining 3 at unidentified locations.

Lewis later returned to the East, publishing a book of his works in Philadelphia in 1835-1836. He died in New York City on November 2, 1858.

== Major published works ==
Based on his drawings and paintings of treaty ceremonies between 1825 and 1828, Lewis published a collection, The Aboriginal Port Folio, in Philadelphia between 1835 and 1836. Lewis also contributed portraits to the History of the Indian Tribes of North America collection, prepared by Thomas L. McKenney's office, and published from 1823 to 1834. Although Lewis was not officially specifically credited for images in McKenney's Sketches of a Tour to the Lakes... (1827), the majority of the plates are believed to be his.

== Legacy ==
Lewis's works are held in the collection of the Smithsonian American Art Museum.
