= Treaty of St. Joseph =

1827 treaty between the United States and Potawatomi

Note: There are multiple treaties referred to as Treaty with the Potawatomi. See Treaty with the Potawatomi for others.

The Treaty of St. Joseph (formally titled A treaty between the United States and the Potawatamie Tribe of Indians) was a treaty established between the United States of America and the Potawatomi tribe on September 19, 1827, in St. Joseph, Michigan. The document, and many others like it, was created in service of the United States government's policy of Indian removal.

== Summary ==
Citing the need to "consolidate some of the dispersed bands of the Potawatamie Tribe in the Territory of Michigan," the treaty lists several tracts of land "heretofore reserved for the use of the said Tribe" which were to be ceded to the United States. The treaty makes clear that these lands were being ceded in order to keep the Potawatomi "as far as practicable from the settlements of the Whites" and the Territorial Road leading from Detroit to Chicago.

The cessions cover settlements in southeast Michigan, along the River Rouge and the River Raisin, as well as tracts in southwest Michigan around the Kalamazoo River. In exchange, the Potawatomi were to receive a consolidated reservation occupying large areas around the border between the modern-day Michigan counties of Kalamazoo and St. Joseph.

The treaty was formally proclaimed on February 23, 1829.

== Signatories ==
Lewis Cass, governor of the Michigan Territory, signed on behalf of the United States. On behalf of the Potawatomi tribe, marks were made by Mixs-a-bee, Shee-ko-maig, Pee-nai-sheish, Kne-o-suck-o-wah, Mais-ko-see, A-bee-ta-que-zic, Ko-jai-waince, Sa-kee-maus, Match-E-Be-Nash-She-Wish, Ma-tsai-bat-to, Ne-kee-quin-nish-ka, Wa-kai-she-maus, Peerish Moran, Mee-she-pe-she-wa-non, O-tuck-quen, Que-quan, Wai-sai-gau, O-kee-yau, and Me-shai-wais.
