= Second Treaty of Prairie du Chien =

1829 treaty between the United States and Native Americans

The Treaty of Prairie du Chien may refer to any of several treaties made and signed in Prairie du Chien, Wisconsin between the United States, representatives from the Sioux, Sac and Fox, Menominee, Ioway, Winnebago and the Anishinaabeg (Chippewa, Ottawa and Potawatomi) Native American peoples.

Two treaties were negotiated simultaneously at Prairie du Chien in the summer of 1829, both signed by General John McNeil Jr., Colonel Pierre Menard, and Caleb Atwater for the United States. Both treaties were proclaimed on January 2, 1830.

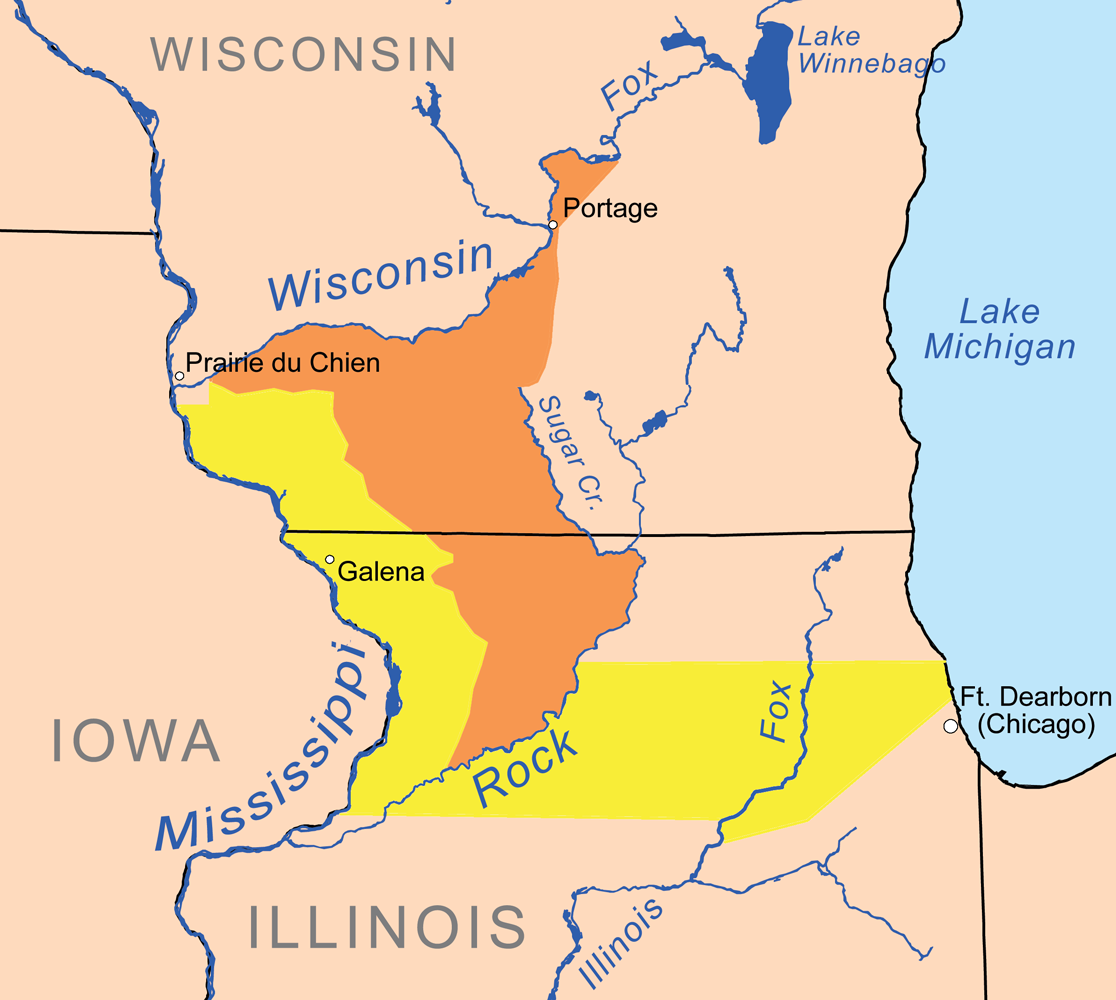
Land ceded to the U.S. at Prairie du Chien in 1829 by the Three Fires Confederacy (in yellow) and the Winnebago (Ho-Chunk) tribe (in orange).

The first of these, the second Treaty of Prairie du Chien, concluded on July 29, 1829, was between the United States and representatives of the Council of Three Fires (also known as the "United Nations of Chippewa, Ottawa, and Potawatomi Indians"). By this treaty, the tribes ceded to the United States an area in present-day northwestern Illinois and southwestern Wisconsin, as well as the areas currently occupied by the cities of Wilmette, Evanston, and about half of Chicago. In exchange the U.S. promised 16 thousand dollars "in specie" per annum and fifty barrels of salt per annum. This treaty established reservation areas in western Illinois for the Prairie Band of Potawatomi Nation. Later the US removed them further west to Kansas. This treaty also preserved the rights of the Council of Three Fires to hunt in the ceded territory "so long as the same shall remain the property of the United States". The U.S. also received many acres of timber.

== See also ==
- Treaty of St. Louis (1804)
- Treaty of St. Louis (1816)
- Treaty of St. Louis (1818)
- Treaty of St. Louis (1825)
