= First Treaty of Prairie du Chien =

1825 treaty between the United States and Native Americans

The Treaty of Prairie du Chien may refer to any of several treaties made and signed in Prairie du Chien, Wisconsin between the United States, representatives from the Sioux, Sac and Fox, Menominee, Iowa, Ho-Chunk and the Anishinaabeg (Ojibwe, Odawa and Potawatomi) Native American peoples.

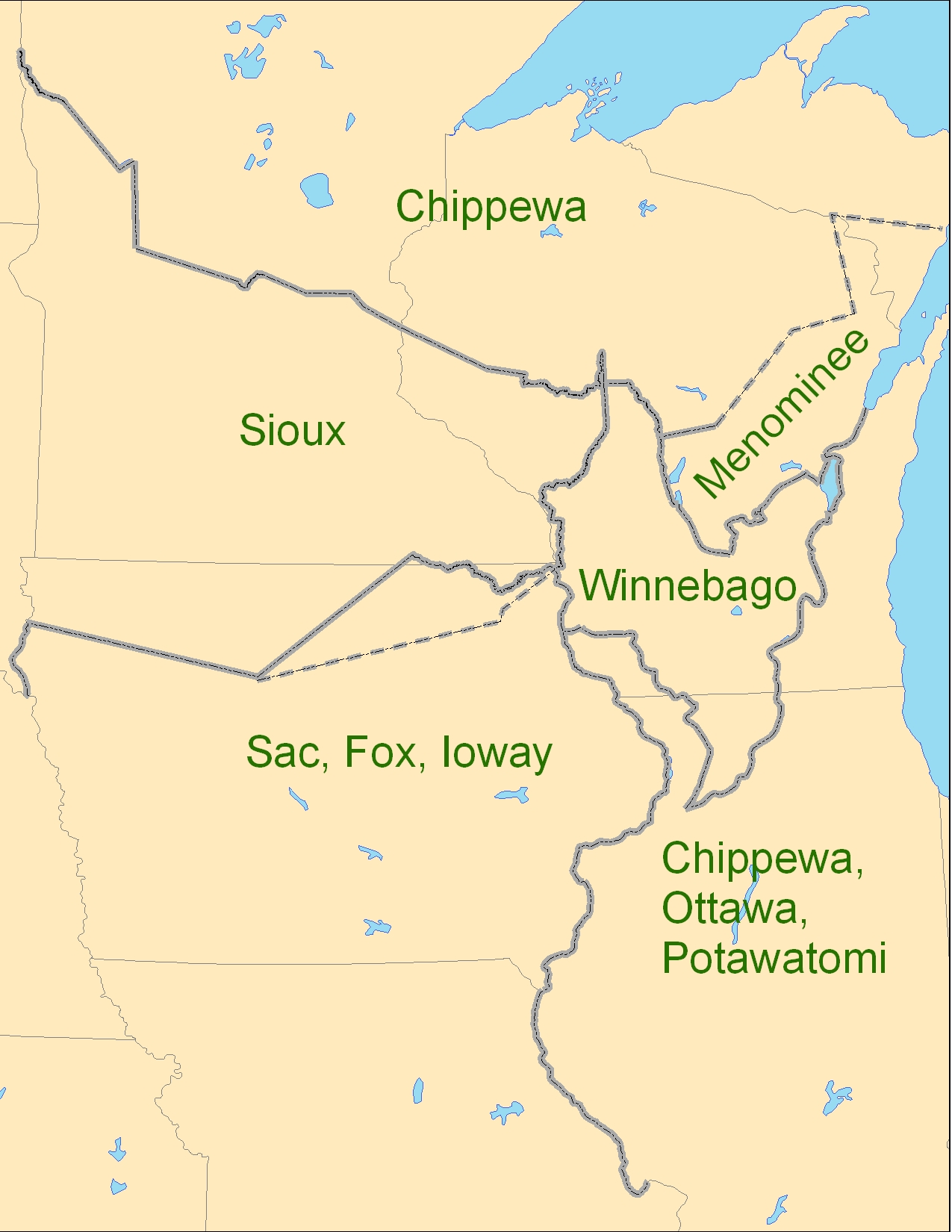
Prairie du Chien Lines. Subsequent boundary modifications shown as dashed lines.

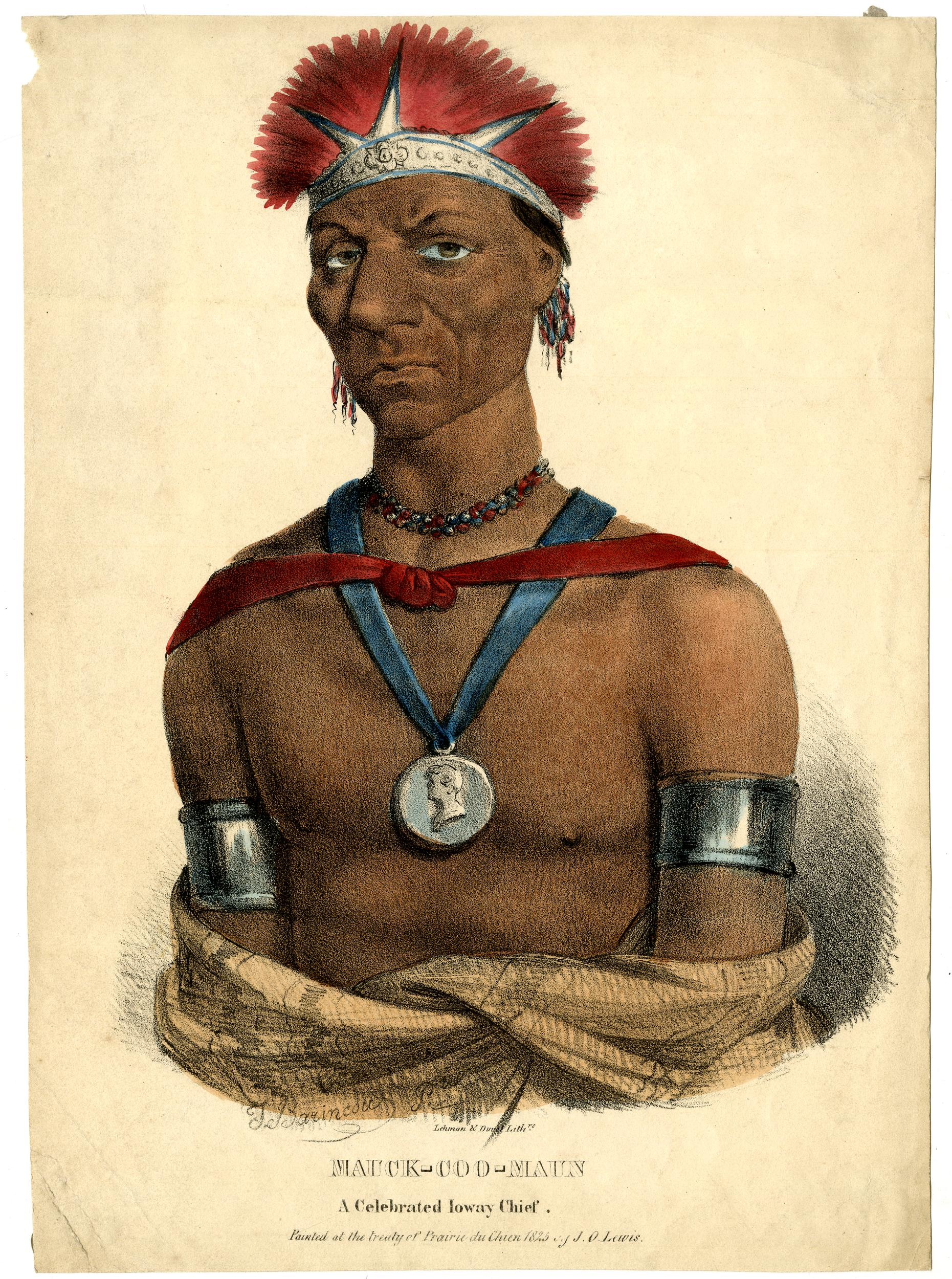
portrait of Ioway chief Mauck-Coo-Maun, painted at the treaty by James Otto Lewis

== Description ==
The First Treaty of Prairie du Chien was signed by William Clark and Lewis Cass for the United States and representatives of the Sioux, Sac and Fox, Menominee, Ioway, Winnebago, and Anishinaabeg (Chippewa and the Council of Three Fires of Chippewa, Ottawa and Potawatomi) on August 19, 1825, proclaimed on February 6, 1826, and codified as 7 Stat. 272.

After the War of 1812, the U.S. government took an active interest in the northwestern frontier. Inter-tribal warfare was disrupting the fur trade, and the influx of miners and increasing numbers of squatters into Indian territories was causing rising tensions between the tribes and settlers.

To resolve these difficulties, the U.S. government invited thousands of Indian representatives from all of the affected tribes in the Upper Mississippi region to come gather at Prairie du Chien during August 1825. Territorial governors, William Clark of Missouri and Lewis Cass of Michigan, facilitated discussions. The product of these talks was a general treaty of peace among all of the tribes in attendance, which established boundaries between tribal nations, white settlers and Native Americans’ lands. Signed by U.S. officials and representatives of the Sioux, Ojibwe (Ojibwa/Ojibway/Chippewa), Sauk (Sac/Sak), Fox (Meskwaki), Illinois, Menominee, Iowa (Ioway/Iowan), Winnebago (Ho-chunk), Ottawa (Ottowa/Odawa), and Potawatomi (Potawattomie) tribes, the 1825 Treaty of Prairie du Chien ultimately was created in efforts to eliminate hostilities between Native American neighbouring nations until separate treaties could be negotiated with each respective tribe (for example, see a subsequent single tribe-based Treaty that specifically followed as a result of this one - the 1826 Treaty of Fond du Lac. This Treaty was signed in Duluth, Minnesota with the Chippewas of Lake Superior and the Mississippi Chippewa Nations).

Due to the overall tribal movements toward the western direction under pressure of encroaching settlers, the Sioux Nation resisted and came into conflict with other tribes moving west into their traditional territory. Ongoing wars between neighbouring tribes have, for many years, been carried on between the Sioux and the Chippewas, and between the Confederated Tribes of Sacs and Foxes, and the Sioux; and also between the Iowa Tribe and Sioux.

The United States negotiated the treaty in attempts to remove all causes of future conflicts between nearby tribes. The aim of trying to reduce inter-tribal warfare was essentially to promote peace among all of the tribes involved, and to establish boundaries among their lands as they all lived and/or hunted within close vicinity of one another. It was with great fear that if not terminated, the ongoing warfare would extend to other tribes beyond those who were already affected; thus, leading to further hostilities involving other Indian nations who resided along the Missouri, the Mississippi, and the Lakes.

The treaty begins by establishing peace between the Sioux and their neighbors: Chippewa, Sac and Fox, and Ioway peoples. The treaty continues by demarcating formal boundaries among each of the tribal groups, often called the "Prairie du Chien Line". The treaty claimed American sovereignty over the territories. For peoples accustomed to ranging over a wide area, the Prairie du Chien Line served as a hindrance, as it provided that tribes were to hunt only within their acknowledged limits. Due to the vast scope of the Treaty of Prairie du Chien and the fact that not all of the necessary tribal (mostly Ojibway/Chippewa) Chiefs or their respective representatives were present at its negotiating and signing stages. Therefore, the Treaty of Prairie du Chien provided for additional councils to be held the following year. Along with these additional councils, the Chippewa (Ojibwe) agreed to additional negotiation meetings. (See the 1826 Treaty of Fond du Lac).

Such additional councils and negotiation meetings between with the Chippewa (Ojibwe) in 1826 can be considered somewhat successful. In August 1826, the U.S. and representatives of the Ojibwe (Chippewa) of Lake Superior and the Mississippi Ojibwe (Chippewa) Nations gave in to governmental greed by way of disguised promises and deceiving language, authoritative pressures and tactics of manipulation in order for the federal government to successfully obtain sovereignty over the Chippewa's traditional lands for the sole purpose of stealing their natural resources – mainly minerals. By agreeing to and signing the 1826 Treaty of Fond du Lac, the U.S. government was given the rights to minerals, exploration and mining upon the Chippewas traditional tribal lands that were located north of the Prairie du Chien Line. Provisions were also made at that time for Ojibwe living on and around Saint Mary's River. Included as addenda to this Treaty were arrest warrants for specific individuals living outside the jurisdiction of the U.S. were issued. Land grants to the Métis were also made under this addenda).

The US used the series of Prairie du Chien Lines to serve as the land cession boundaries in later treaties.

=== Treaty outline and numbered articles ===
The government, who began their campaign to control the Indians west of the Mississippi, proposed the first peace-based friendship treaty that included numerous tribes in the vast encompassing region at that time. The 1825 Treaty of Prairie du Chien was signed at Prairie du Chien, Wisconsin and over a thousand Sioux, Winnebago, Chippewa, Menominee, Illinois, Sac, Fox (Meskwaki), and Iowa were included in the negotiations and final agreement which was ultimately signed and codified.

The main issue, and prime reason, that the U.S. government stepped-in was in hopes to establish peace amongst the neighbouring tribes who were often fighting over lands and tribal boundaries. By fixing the established tribal boundaries the aim was to stop the ongoing war between the tribes. In doing so, a “No-Man's Land," known as the “Neutral Zone,” was created for the purpose of separating the three enemy tribes – the Sioux, Sac and Fox. The Iowa were to share the lands south of the Line with the Sac and Fox. Since the Sioux were not yet there but were acknowledged by all parties to have a vested interest, a final decision could not be made, particularly regarding the western boundaries. This was primarily due to the fact that there were several other existing tribes, including the Omaha and Otoe, who were in disagreement and strongly contested the proposed western boundaries.

The treaty consisted of 15 articles:

Article 1 - Firm and perpetual peace between the Sioux and the confederated tribes of Sacs and Foxes; and between the Ioways and the Sioux.

Article 2 - the Line between the respective countries.

Article 3 - Relinquishment of Sacs and Foxes. Iowas accede to the arrangement.

Article 4 - Claim of the Ottoes not to be affected by this treaty.

Article 5 - Agreement between the Sioux and Chippewas.

Article 6 - Agreement between the Chippewas and the Winnebagoes.

Article 7 - Agreement between the Winnebagoes and the Sioux, Sacs and Foxes, Chippewas, Ottawas and Potawatomies of the Illinois.

Article 8 - Agreement between the Menominees and the Sioux, Chippewas, Winnebagoes, Ottawa, Chippewa and Potawatomie Indians of the Illinois.

Article 9 - Boundary of the Ottawas, Chippewas, and Potawatomies.

Article 10 - Said tribes acknowledge the supremacy of the United States.

Article 11 - A council to be held in 1826.

Article 12 - An assembly of the Chippewas to be convened.

Article 13 - No tribe to hunt within the acknowledged limits of any other without their assent.

Article 14 - In case of difficulty between the tribes.

Article 15 - When to take effect.

=== Lands ceded ===
As a result of the 1825 Treaty of Prairie du Chien, surprisingly there were no lands ceded by the Iowa. The Ioway were to remain south of the newly established boundary between the Sioux to the north, and Sac and Fox to south; the land of which was all within the geographical area of Iowa-Minnesota.

== Signatories ==
The first Treaty du Prairie des Chiens was signed and sealed on location in Prairie des Chiens, Territory of Michigan, on August 19, 1825. This was done while under the Presidential Administration of John Quincy Adams.

Please take note that the small letter “x” marked beside each individuals native name represents their actual signatures on the original paper Treaty of 1825. The letters “L. S.” that appear at the end of every signature line represent the abbreviation for the Latin phrase, “logus sigilli,” which means “place of the seal”.

Sioux:

Wa-ba-sha, x or the leaf, [L. S.]

Pe-tet-te x Corbeau, little crow, [L. S.]

The Little x of the Wappitong tribe, [L. S.]

Tartunka-nasiah x Sussitong, [L. S.]

Sleepy Eyes, x Sossitong, [L. S.]

Two faces x do [L. S.]

Two faces x do [L. S.]

French Crow x Wappacoota, [L. S.]

Kee-jee x do [L. S.]

Tar-se-ga x do [L. S.]

Wa-ma-de-tun-ka x black dog, [L. S.]

Wan-na-ta x Yancton, or he that charges on his enemies, [L. S.]

Red Wing x [L. S.]

Ko-ko-ma-ko x [L. S.]

Sha-co-pe x the Sixth, [L. S.]

Pe-ni-si-on x [L. S.]

Eta-see-pa x Wabasha’s band, [L. S.]

Wa-ka-u-hee, x Sioux band, rising thunder, [L. S.]

The Little Crow, x Sussetong, [L. S.]

Po-e-ha-pa x Me-da-we-con-tong, or eagle head, [L. S.]

Ta-ke-wa-pa x Wappitong, or medicine blanket, [L. S.]

Tench-ze-part, x his bow, [L. S.]

Masc-pu-lo-chas-tosh, x the white man, [L. S.]

Te-te-kar-munch, x the buffaloman, [L. S.]

Wa-sa-o-ta x Sussetong, or a great of hail, [L. S.]

Oeyah-ko-ca, x the crackling tract, [L. S.]

Mak-to-wah-ke-ark, x the bear, [L. S.]

Winnebagoes:

Les quatres jambes, x [L. S.]

Carimine, x the turtle that walks, [L. S.]

De-ca-ri, x [L. S.] Wan-ca-ha-ga, x or snake’s skin, [L. S.]

Sa-sa-ma-ni, x [L. S.]

Wa-non-che-qua, x the merchant, [L. S.]

Chon-que-pa, x or dog’s head, [L. S.] Cha-rat-chon, x the smoker, [L. S.]

Ca-ri-ca-si-ca, x he that kills the crow, [L. S.]

Watch-kat-o-que, x the grand canoe, [L. S.]

Ho-wa-mick-a, x the little elk, [L. S.]

Menominees:

Ma-can-me-ta, x medicine bear, [L. S.]

Chau-wee-nou-mi-tai, x medicine south wind, [L. S.]

Char-o-nee, x [L. S.]

Ma-wesh-a, x the little wolf, [L. S.]

A-ya-pas-mis-ai, x the thunder that turns, [L. S.]

Cha-ne-pau, x the riband, [L. S.]

La-me-quon, x the spoon, [L. S.]

En-im-e-tas, x the barking wolf, [L. S.]

Pape-at, x the one just arrived, [L. S.]

O-que-men-ce, x the little chief, [L. S.]

Chippewas:

Shinguaba x W’Ossin, 1st chief of the Chippewa nation, Saulte St. Marie, [L. S.]

Gitspee x Jiauba, 2d chief, [L. S.]

Gitspee x Waskee, or le boeuf of la pointe lake Superior, [L. S.]

Nain-a-boozhu, x of la pointe lake Superior, [L. S.]

Monga, x Zid or loon’s foot of Fond du Lac, [L. S.]

Weescoup, x or sucre of Fond du Lac, [L. S.]

Mush-Koas, x or the elk of Fond du Lac, [L. S.]

Nau-bun x Aqeezhik, of Fond du Lac, [L. S.]

Kau-ta-waubeta, x or broken tooth of Sandy lake, [L. S.]

Pugisaingegen, x or broken arm of Sandy lake, [L. S.]

Kwee-weezaishish, x or gross guelle of Sandy lake, [L. S.]

Ba-ba-see-kundade, x or curling hair of Sandy lake, [L. S.]

Paashineep, x or man shooting at the mark of Sandy lake, [L. S.]

Pu-ga-a-gik, x the little beef, Leech lake [L. S.]

Pee-see-ker, x or buffalo, St. Croix band, [L. S.]

Nau-din, x or the wind, St. Croix band [L. S.]

Nau-quan-a-bee, x of Mille lac [L. S.]

Tu-kau-bis-hoo, x or crouching lynx of Lac Courte Oreille, [L. S.]

The Red Devil, x of Lac Courte Oreille, [L. S.]

The Track, x of Lac Courte Oreille, [L. S.]

Ne-bo-na-bee, x the mermaid Lac Courte Oreille, [L. S.]

Pi-a-gick, x the single man St. Croix, [L. S.]

Pu-in-a-ne-gi, x, or the hole in the day, Sandy lake, [L. S.]

Moose-o-mon-e, x plenty of elk, St. Croix band, [L. S.]

Nees-o-pe-na, x or two birds of Upper Red Cedar lake, [L. S.]

Shaata, x the pelican of Leech lake, [L. S.]

Che-on-o-quet, x the great cloud of Leech lake, [L. S.]

I-au-ben-see, x the little buck of Red lake, [L. S.]

Kia-wa-tas, x the tarrier of Leech lake, [L. S.]

Mau-ge-ga-bo, x the leader of Leech lake, [L. S.]

Nan-go-tuck, x the flame of Leech lake, [L. S.]

Nee-si-day-sish, x the sky of Red lake, [L. S.]

Pee-chan-a-nim, x striped feather of Sandy lake, [L. S.]

White Devil, x of Leech lake, [L. S.]

Ka-ha-ka, x the sparrow, Lac, Courte Oreille, [L. S.]

I-au-be-ence, x little buck of Rice lake, Ca-ba-ma-bee, x the assembly of St. Croix, [L. S.]

Nau-gau-nosh, x the forward man lake Flambeau, [L. S.]

Caw-win-dow, x he that gathers berries of Sandy Lake, [L. S.]

On-que-ess, the mink, lake Superior, [L. S.]

Ke-we-ta-ke-pe, x all round the sky, [L. S.]

The-sees, x [L. S.]

Ottawas:

Chaboner, x or Chambly, [L. S.]

Shaw-fau-wick, x the mink, [L. S.]

Potawatomies:

Ignace, x [L. S.]

Ke-o-kuk, x [L. S.]

Che-chan-quose, x the little crane, [L. S.]

Taw-wa-na-nee, x the trader, [L. S.]

Sacs:

Na-o-tuk, x the stabbing chief, [L. S.]

Pish-ken-au-nee, x all fish, [L. S.]

Po-ko-nau-qua, x or broken arm, [L. S.]

Wau-kau-che, x eagle nose, [L. S.]

Quash-kaume, x jumping fish, [L. S.]

Ochaach, x the fisher, [L. S.]

Ke-o-kuck, x the watchful fox, [L. S.]

Skin-gwin-ee-see, the x ratler, [L. S.]

Was-ar-wis-ke-no, x the yellow bird, [L. S.]

Pau-ko-tuk, x the open sky, [L. S.]

Au-kaak-wan-e-suk, x he that vaults on the earth, [L. S.]

Mu-ku-taak-wan-wet, x [L. S.]

Mis-ke-bee, x the standing hair, [L. S.]

Foxes:

Wan-ba-law, x the playing fox, [L. S.]

Ti-a-mah, x the bear that makes the rocks shake, [L. S.]

Pee-ar-maski, x the jumping sturgeon, [L. S.]

Shagwa-na-tekwishu, x the thunder that is heard all over the world, [L. S.]

Mis-o-win, x moose deer horn, [L. S.]

No-ko-wot, x the down of the fur, [L. S.]

Nau-sa-wa-quot, x the bear that sleeps on the forks, [L. S.]

Shin-quin-is, x the ratler, [L. S.]

O-lo-pee-aau, x or Mache-paho-ta, the bear, [L. S.]

Keesis, x the sun, [L. S.]

No-wank, x he that gives too little, [L. S.]

Kan-ka-mote, x [L. S.]

Neek-waa, x [L. S.]

Ka-tuck-e-kan-ka, x the fox with a spotted breast, [L. S.]

Mock-to-back-sa-gum, x black tobacco, [L. S.]

Wes-kesa, x the bear family, [L. S.]

Ioways:

Ma-hos-ka, x the white cloud, [L. S.]

Pumpkin, x [L. S.]

Wa-ca-nee, x the painted medicine, [L. S.]

Tar-no-mun, x a great many deer, [L. S.]

Wa-hoo-ga, x the owl, [L. S.]

Ta-ca-mo-nee, x the lightning, [L. S.]

Wa-push-a, x the man killer, [L. S.]

To-nup-he-non-e, x the flea, [L. S.]

Mon-da-tonga, x [L. S.]

Cho-wa-row-a, x [L. S.]

Appointed Commissioners:

William Clark, [L. S.]

Lewis Cass, [L. S.]

Witnesses:

Thomas Biddle, secretary,

R. A. McCabe, Captain Fifth Infantry

R. A. Forsyth

N. Boilvin, United States Indian agent

C. C. Trowbridge, sub Indian agent

Henry R. Schoolcraft, United States Indian agent

B. F. Harney, Surgeon U. S. Army

W. B. Alexander, sub Indian agent

Thomas Forsyth, agent Indian affairs

Marvien Blondau

David Bailey

James M’Ilvaine, lieutenant U. S. Army

Law. Taliaferro, Indian agent for Upper Mississippi

John Holiday

William Dickson

S. Campbell, United States interpreter

J. A. Lewis

William Holiday

Dunable Denejlevy

Bela Chapman

== See also ==
- Treaty of St. Louis (1804)
- Treaty of St. Louis (1816)
- Treaty of St. Louis (1818)
- Treaty of St. Louis (1825)
- Treaty of Chicago
