= Treaty of St. Louis (1804) =

1804 series of treaties between the United States and Native Americans

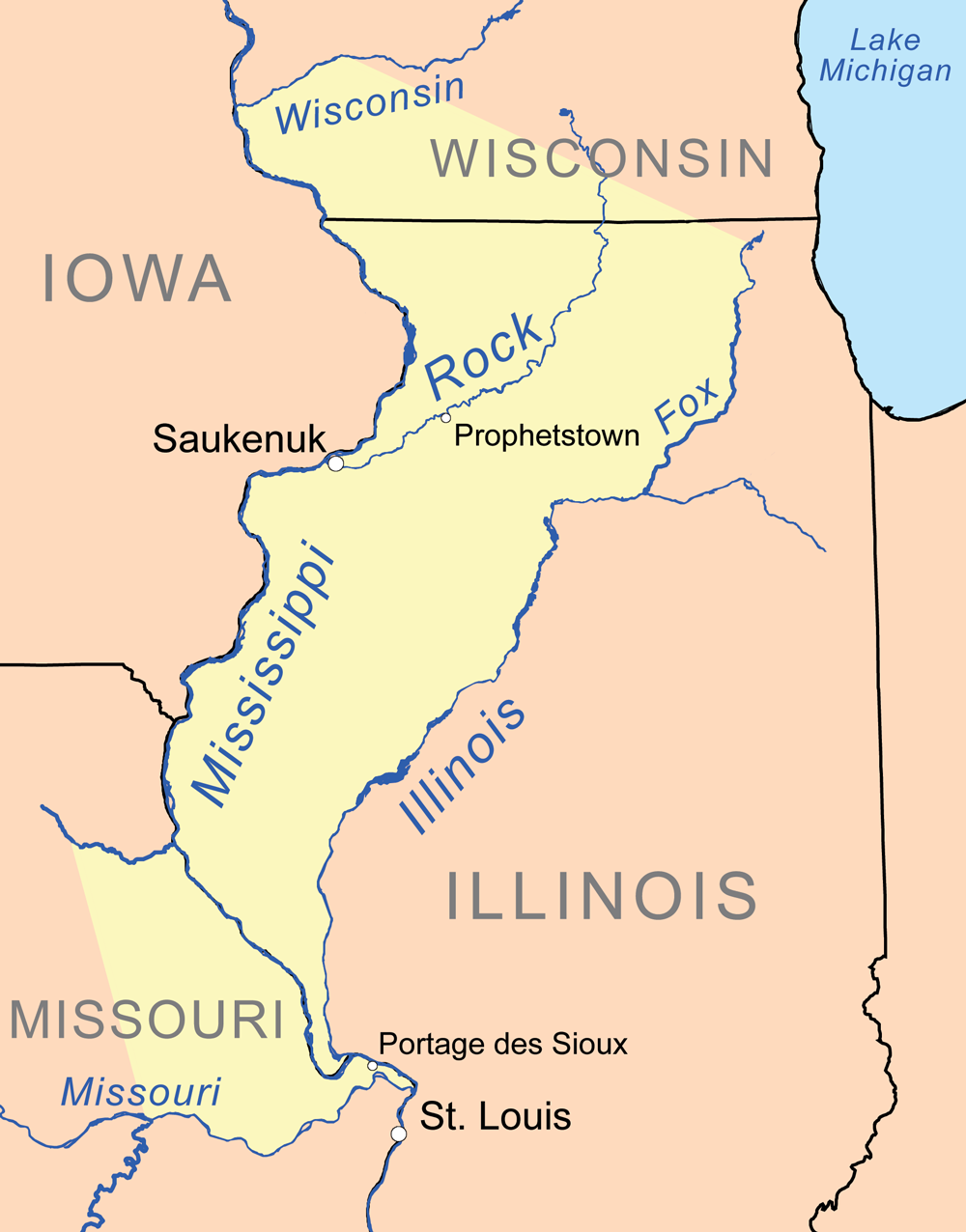
The land ceded to the United States in the 1804 treaty is shown here in yellow.

The Treaty of St. Louis of 1804 was concluded by William Henry Harrison on behalf of the United States of America and five Sauk and Meskwaki chiefs led by Quashquame. The treaty transferred a huge area of land between the Mississippi and Illinois Rivers from the Sauk and Meskwaki to the United States. In return, the Sauk and Meskwaki received a lump-sum payment of $2234.50 and an annuity of $1000. This payment was far less than the value of the land. The signatory chiefs were not authorized to cede land by their tribes and probably did not understand the treaty. The Sauk and Meskwaki deeply resented the treaty and considered it invalid. It alienated them from the United States and encouraged them to ally with Britain, contributing to their support for the British during the later War of 1812.

== Background ==
The Sauk and Meskwaki (or Fox) are closely related Algonquian peoples and traditional allies. They inhabited and controlled a territory along the Upper Mississippi River. This territory was roughly bounded by the Wisconsin River in the north, the Missouri River in the south, and the Des Moines River in the west. In modern terms, it consisted of northwestern Illinois, southwestern Wisconsin, and eastern Missouri.

At the beginning of the 19th century, the territory of the Sauk and Meskwaki fell within the borders claimed by the United States. In 1804, it fell within Indiana Territory, whose governor was the politically ambitious William Henry Harrison. President Thomas Jefferson wanted to open Indiana Territory to American settlement. To this end, he instructed Harrison to purchase the lands of the region’s tribes, authorizing him to employ pressure and trickery.

The Sauk and Meskwaki were each governed by a council of chiefs, which had the power to make treaties and sell land for the tribe, subject to custom. Sauk and Meskwaki custom required an elaborate procedure for the sale of land. First, the council had to receive an official invitation to negotiate a treaty to sell land. Second, the council had to announce this invitation to the tribe. Third, the council had to convene to consider the sale. Fourth, if the council decided to negotiate a sale, a “representative sample” of the tribe’s population had to be present at the negotiations to oversee and instruct the negotiators. Custom also required that the women of the tribe be consulted about any decision related to land, since they did most of the farming among both the Sauk and Meskwaki.

=== Events leading up to the Treaty ===
Between 1802 and 1804, Sauk and Meskwaki hostility toward the United States began to increase. American settlers and hunters began moving into Sauk and Meskwaki territory. The Sauk and Meskwaki had a longtime, low-level conflict with the neighbouring Osage people. The American government began distributing goods to the Osage, but not the Sauk and Meskwaki. It also prevented the Sauk and Meskwaki from raiding the Osage in 1804. The Sauk and Meskwaki likely perceived these policies as support for the Osage. However, the American government probably intended only to halt destabilizing tribal warfare.

In August 1804, Sauk hunters murdered and scalped four American settlers who entered Sauk territory near the Missouri River. The Sauk chiefs denounced the murders, fearful of American retaliation. American officials sent a message to the Sauk demanding that they surrender the murderers for trial and inviting them to negotiate a solution to the murders.

The Sauk tribal council responded by sending a delegation of five chiefs to St. Louis, led by the Sauk chief Quashquame. One or more members of this delegation were Meskwaki. The council instructed the delegation to resolve the issue of the murders. It did not authorize the delegation to sell land.

== Treaty ==
In exchange for an annual payment of $1,000 in goods to be delivered to the tribe in St. Louis ($600 for the Sacs and $400 for the Fox), the tribes gave up a swath of land stretching from northeast Missouri through almost all of Illinois north of the Illinois River as well as a large section of southern Wisconsin. This treaty was deeply resented by the Sauk, especially Black Hawk, who felt that Quashquame was not authorized to sign treaties. This treaty led to many Sauk siding with the British during the War of 1812.

The specific terms for the boundary were:

The general boundary line between the lands of the United States and of the said Indian tribes shall be as follows, to wit: Beginning at a point on the Missouri river opposite to the mouth of the Gasconade river; thence in a direct course so as to strike the river Jeffreon at the distance of thirty miles from its mouth, and down the said Jeffreon to the Mississippi, thence up the Mississippi to the mouth of the Ouisconsing river and up the same to a point which shall be thirty-six miles in a direct line from the mouth of the said river, thence by a direct line to the point where the Fox river (a branch of the Illinois) leaves the small lake called Sakaegan, thence down the Fox river to the Illinois river, and down the same to the Mississippi. And the said tribes, for and in consideration of the friendship and protection of the United States which is now extended to them, of the goods (to the value of two thousand two hundred and thirty-four dollars and fifty cents) which are now delivered, and of the annuity hereinafter stipulated to be paid, do hereby cede and relinquish forever to the United States, all the lands included within the above-described boundary.

Included in this cession were the historic villages along the Rock River, particularly Saukenuk. William Henry Harrison, the representative for the United States, was governor of the Indiana Territory and of the District of Louisiana, superintendent of Indian Affairs for the said territory and district. The party of Sauk who signed the treaty, led by Quashquame, were not expecting to negotiate land and did not include important tribal leaders who would ordinarily have been in such negotiations. Black Hawk never recognized the treaty as valid and this led him to side with the British against settlers in the area during the War of 1812. The treaty was upheld again in the Treaties of Portage des Sioux in 1815 at the end of the war. Black Hawk eventually led the Black Hawk War to fight its terms.

In his autobiography, Black Hawk recalled:

Quashquame, Pashepaho, Ouchequaka and Hashequarhiqua were sent by the Sacs to St. Louis to try and free a prisoner who had killed an American. The Sac tradition was to see if the Americans would release their friend. They were willing to pay for the person killed, thus covering the blood and satisfying the relations of the murdered man.

Upon return Quashquame and party came up and gave us the following account of their mission:

On our arrival at St. Louis we met our American father and explained to him our business, urging the release of our friend. The American chief told us he wanted land. We agreed to give him some on the west side of the Mississippi, likewise more on the Illinois side opposite Jeffreon. When the business was all arranged we expected to have our friend released to come home with us. About the time we were ready to start our brother was let out of the prison. He started and ran a short distance when he was SHOT DEAD!

This was all they could remember of what had been said and done. It subsequently appeared that they had been drunk the greater part of the time while at St. Louis.

This was all myself and nation knew of the treaty of 1804. It has since been explained to me. I found by that treaty, that all of the country east of the Mississippi, and south of Jeffreon was ceded to the United States for one thousand dollars a year. I will leave it to the people of the United States to say whether our nation was properly represented in this treaty? Or whether we received a fair compensation for the extent of country ceded by these four individuals?

== See also ==
- Osage Treaty (disambiguation), several treaties
- List of treaties
- Indian Boundary Park - Chicago
- First Treaty of Prairie du Chien
- Second Treaty of Prairie du Chien
- Third Treaty of Prairie du Chien
- Fourth Treaty of Prairie du Chien
- Treaty of Chicago
