= Treaty of St. Louis (1825) =

1804–1825 treaties between the United States and Native Americans

The Treaty of St. Louis is the name of a series of treaties signed between the United States and various Native American tribes from 1804 through 1824. The fourteen treaties were all signed in the St. Louis, Missouri area.

The Treaty of St. Louis (1825) was signed on November 7, 1825 (proclaimed on December 30, 1825) between William Clark on behalf of the United States and delegates from the Shawnee Nation. In this treaty, the Shawnee ceded lands to the United States near Cape Girardeau, from Cape Girardeau west to the Whitewater River. In return for Cape Girardeau, the United States government gave the Shawnee a sum of 11,000 dollars and leased to them a blacksmith shop for five years providing all tools and 300 pounds of iron annually. Moreover, peace and friendship between the two nations were renewed and perpetuated.

== See also ==
- Osage Treaty, several treaties
- List of U.S. Native American treaties
- Indian Boundary Park - Chicago
