= Treaties of Portage des Sioux =

1815 treaties between the United States and Native Americans

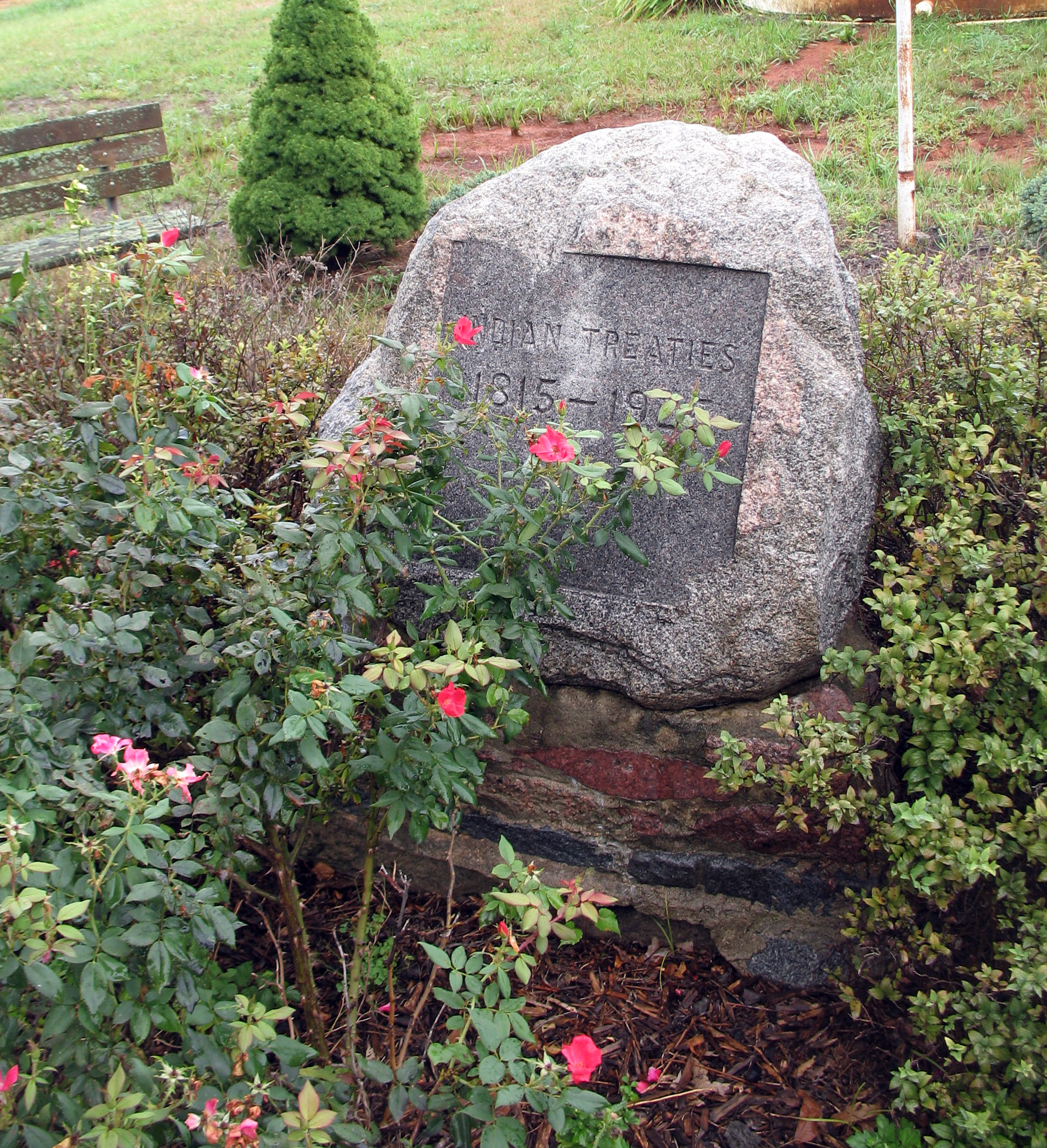
Memorial to the treaties in Portage des Sioux

The Treaties of Portage des Sioux were a series of treaties at Portage des Sioux, Missouri in 1815 that officially were supposed to mark the end of conflicts between the United States and Native Americans at the conclusion of the War of 1812.

Although the treaties were ostensibly to "restore to such Tribes or Nations respectively all the possessions, rights, and privileges which they may have enjoyed or been entitled to in 1811" which was required in Article IX of the Treaty of Ghent which ended the war, they were to be used to affirm and consolidate earlier treaties in which the United States had secured vast territory of the Midwest from tribes in agreements that had earlier not been signed by all the appropriate Native American representatives.

The earlier treaties included the Treaty of St. Louis (1804) in which the Sac and Fox ceded a swath of land from Missouri through Illinois and Wisconsin and the Treaty of Fort Clark in 1808 in which the Osage Nation ceded Missouri and Arkansas east of Fort Clark.

The treaties were to form the legal basis in which tribes were to be relocated west of Missouri in Indian Territory and which was to clear the way for the states to enter the Union.

On March 11, 1815, President James Madison appointed William Clark (governor of Missouri Territory), Ninian Edwards (governor of Illinois Territory), and Auguste Chouteau (a St. Louis businessman who had made his fortune dealing in the fur trade with the Native Americans) to the commission to conclude the treaty. The President authorized an expenditure of $20,000 for gifts for the chiefs. The commissioners met in St. Louis, Missouri on May 11, 1815 to make the arrangements and extend 37 invitations to the Chiefs.

The treaty signings at Portage des Sioux were to occur between July 18 and September 16.

The most notable chief to refuse the invitation was Black Hawk who was compelled to come and was the last to sign the treaty. He was to resist its terms in the Black Hawk War.

The tribes signing (in order of signatures):

- Potawatomi
- Piankeshaw
- Lakota
- Mdewakantonwan Dakota
- Yankton Sioux
- Omaha
- Kickapoo
- Osage Nation
- Sac
- Fox
- Iowa

Other tribes were to sign the treaties in St. Louis.

== See also ==
- Osage Treaty (disambiguation), several treaties
