= Council of Three Fires =

Native American confederacy

United Nations of Ojibwe, Ottawa, and Potawatomi Niswi-mishkodewinan
- 796–1740s
- Status: Confederation
- Common languages: Ojibwemowin, Daawaamwin, Bodwéwadmimwen, Hand Talk
- Demonyms: Ojibweg, Odaawaag, Bodéwadmik
- History
  - Established: 796
  - Disestablished: 1740s
Succeeded by
Northwestern Confederacy
- Today part of: Canada, United States

The Council of Three Fires (Note: (in Anishinaabemowin: Niswi-mishkodewinan), also known as the People of the Three Fires; the Three Fires Confederacy; or the United Nations of Chippewa, Ottawa, and Potawatomi Indians.) is a long-standing alliance of the Ojibwe, Odawa, and Potawatomi, three Anishinaabe peoples who are Indigenous peoples of the Northeastern Woodlands.

== Origin ==
Originally one people or a collection of closely related bands, the distinct identities of Ojibwe, Odawa, and Potawatomi developed after the Anishinaabe reached Michilimackinac on their journey westward from the Atlantic coast. Using the Midewiwin scrolls, Potawatomi elder Shup-Shewana dated the formation of the Council of Three Fires to 796 AD at Michilimackinac. In this council, the Ojibwe were addressed as the "Older Brother", the Odawa as the "Middle Brother", and the Potawatomi as the "Younger Brother". Consequently, whenever the three Anishinaabe nations are mentioned in this specific and consecutive order of Ojibwe, Odawa, and Potawatomi, it is an indicator implying Council of Three Fires as well.

The council split into three groups during the early 16th century. The Ojibwe (Chippewa) became known as the "Keepers of the Faith", the Odawa as the "Keepers of Trade", and the Potawatomi as the "Keepers of the Sacred Fire" Boodawaadam, meaning "those who keep/tend the hearth-fire," became the basis for the Potawatomi name Boodewaadamii (Ojibwe spelling) or Bodéwadmi (Potawatomi spelling).

== Purpose ==
Though the Three Fires had several meeting places, Michilimackinac became the preferred meeting place due to its central location. From this place, the Council met for military and political purposes. From this site, the Council maintained relations with neighboring tribes, including Shawnee, Ozaagii (Sauk), Odagaamii (Meskwaki), Omanoominii (Menominee), Wiinibiigoo (Ho-Chunk), Naadawe (Haudenosaunee Confederacy), Nii'inaawi-Naadawe (Wyandot), and Naadawensiw (Dakota). Upon contact, they also maintained relations with the Wemitigoozhi (French), Zhaaganaashi (English) and the Gichi-mookomaanag (the Americans).

Through the totem-system and promotion of trade, the Council generally maintained a peaceful existence with its neighbors. However, occasional unresolved disputes erupted into wars. Under these conditions, the Council notably fought against the Haudenosaunee and the Dakota. During the French and Indian War and Pontiac's War, the Council fought against Great Britain; and during the Northwest Indian War and the War of 1812, they fought against the United States. After the formation of the United States of America in 1776, the Council became the core member of the Western Lakes Confederacy (also known as "Great Lakes Confederacy"), joined with the Wyandots, Algonquins, Nipissing, Sacs, Meskwaki and others.

== Treaties ==
=== With Great Britain ===
- Treaty of Fort Niagara (1764) – as part of the Western Lakes Confederacy.

=== With the United States ===
- Treaty of Fort Harmar (1789) – implied
- Treaty of Greenville (1795) – implied
- Treaty of Fort Industry (1805) – not implied, though all 3 nations present
- Treaty of Detroit (1807) – not implied, though all 3 nations present
- Treaty of Brownstown (1808) – implied
- Treaty of Springwells (1815) – implied
- Treaty of St. Louis (1816)
- Treaty of Fort Meigs (1817) – not implied, though all 3 nations present
- Treaty of Chicago (1821) – not implied, though all 3 nations present
- First Treaty of Prairie du Chien (1825) – implied, as well as individually with the Ojibwe and Odawa.
- Second Treaty of Prairie du Chien (1829)
- Treaty of Washington (1836) with the Ojibwe and Odawa
- Treaty of Chicago (1833) – all 3 nations party to treaty

== See also ==
- Mackinaw City, Michigan
