= Indian Boundary Park =

- U.S. National Register of Historic Places
- U.S. Historic district
- Chicago Landmark
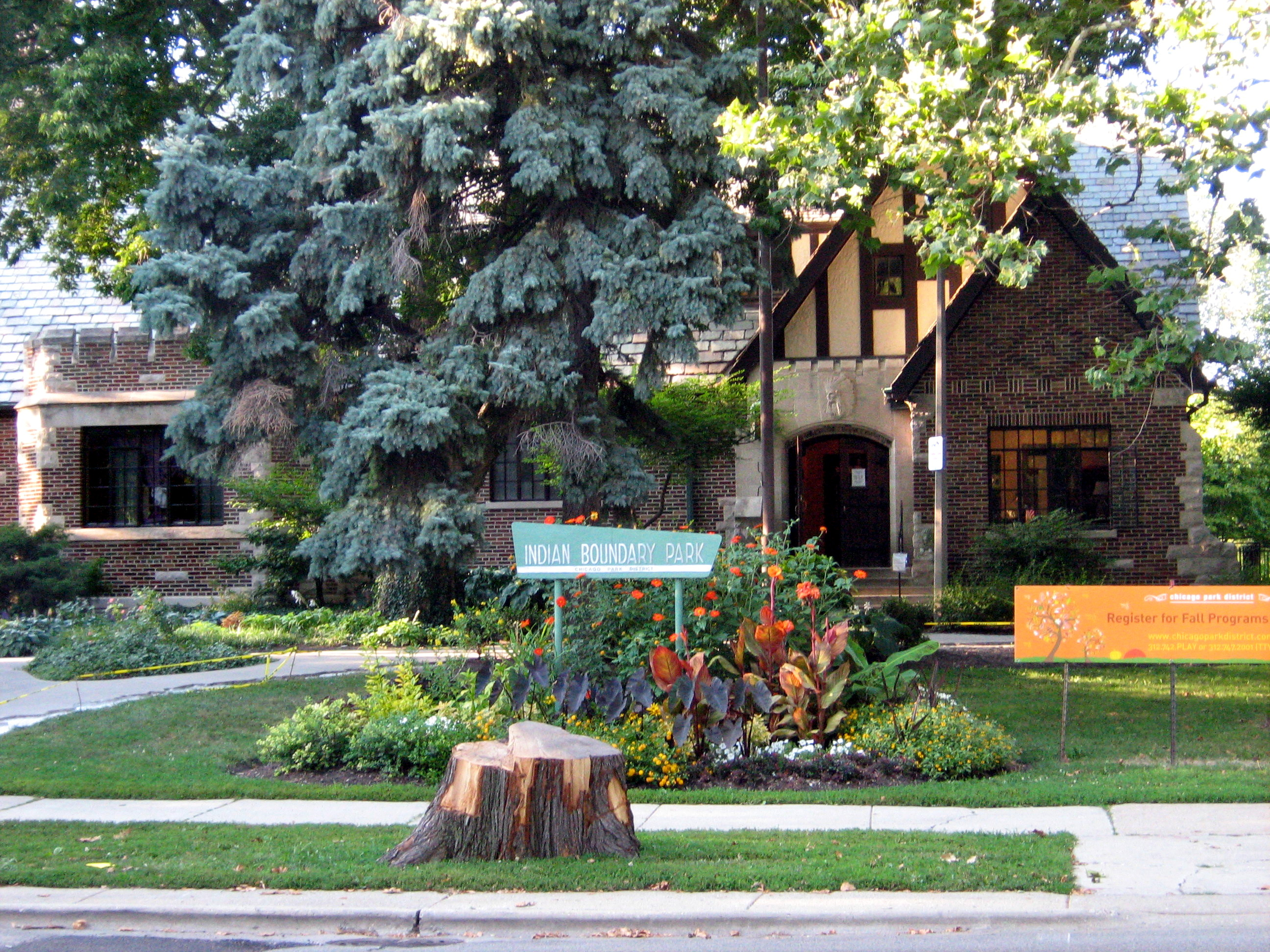
- Indian Boundary Park Fieldhouse

- Location within Chicago metropolitan area
- Location: 2500 W. Lunt Ave; Chicago, Illinois
- Coordinates: 42°0′34″N 87°41′36″W
- Area: 13 acres (5.3 ha)
- Built: 1922; 104 years ago
- Architect: Gloede, Richard F.; Hatzfeld, Clarence
- Architectural style: Tudor Revival
- MPS: Chicago Park District MPS
- NRHP reference No.: 95000485

Significant dates
- Added to NRHP: April 20, 1995
- Designated CHICL: May 11, 2005

Indian Boundary Park is a 13-acre (5.3 ha) urban park in the West Ridge neighborhood of North Side, Chicago, Illinois.

== History ==
The park opened in 1922. It is named after a boundary line that was determined in the 1816 Treaty of St. Louis between the Odawa, Ojibwe, and Potawatomi tribes and the United States government. The line ran through the present park.

=== Former zoo ===
Indian Boundary Park once had a small zoo, which began with a single American black bear. In later years, it primarily housed farm animals, such as goats, ducks, and chickens. The zoo was maintained by the Zoological Society of the Lincoln Park Zoo. In 2013, the zoo at Indian Boundary Park was closed and the remaining few animals were sent to Lincoln Park Zoo.

=== Facilities ===
Indian Boundary Park is noted for its fieldhouse, which was completed in 1929. The design of the fieldhouse incorporates Native American and Tudor elements. In 1989, a large playground was added to the park and assembled with the help of neighborhood residents.

The park was added to the National Register of Historic Places in 1995, and the fieldhouse was named a Chicago Landmark in 2005.

The historic fieldhouse was extensively damaged by a fire on May 20, 2012. Restoration to the fieldhouse began in the late summer of 2013 after extensive negotiations between the Chicago Park District and the insurance provider. It was fully restored on July 14, 2014, with help from the park supervisor, Philip Martini.
