= Osage Treaty =

Osage Treaty may refer to:

- Osage Treaty (1808) or Treaty of Fort Clark
- Osage Treaty (1815), one of the Treaties of Portage des Sioux
- Osage Treaty (1818) or Treaty of St. Louis
- Osage Treaty (1825) at St. Louis
- Canville Treaty was negotiated at the Fort Smith Council in 1865
- Drum Creek Treaty (1868 and 1870) in Kansas
