= Treaty of Chicago =

1821 and 1833 treaties between the United States and Native Americans

Traditional range of Anishinaabe—Anishinini, including Council of Three Fires, near the Great Lakes (c. 1650 - 1820)

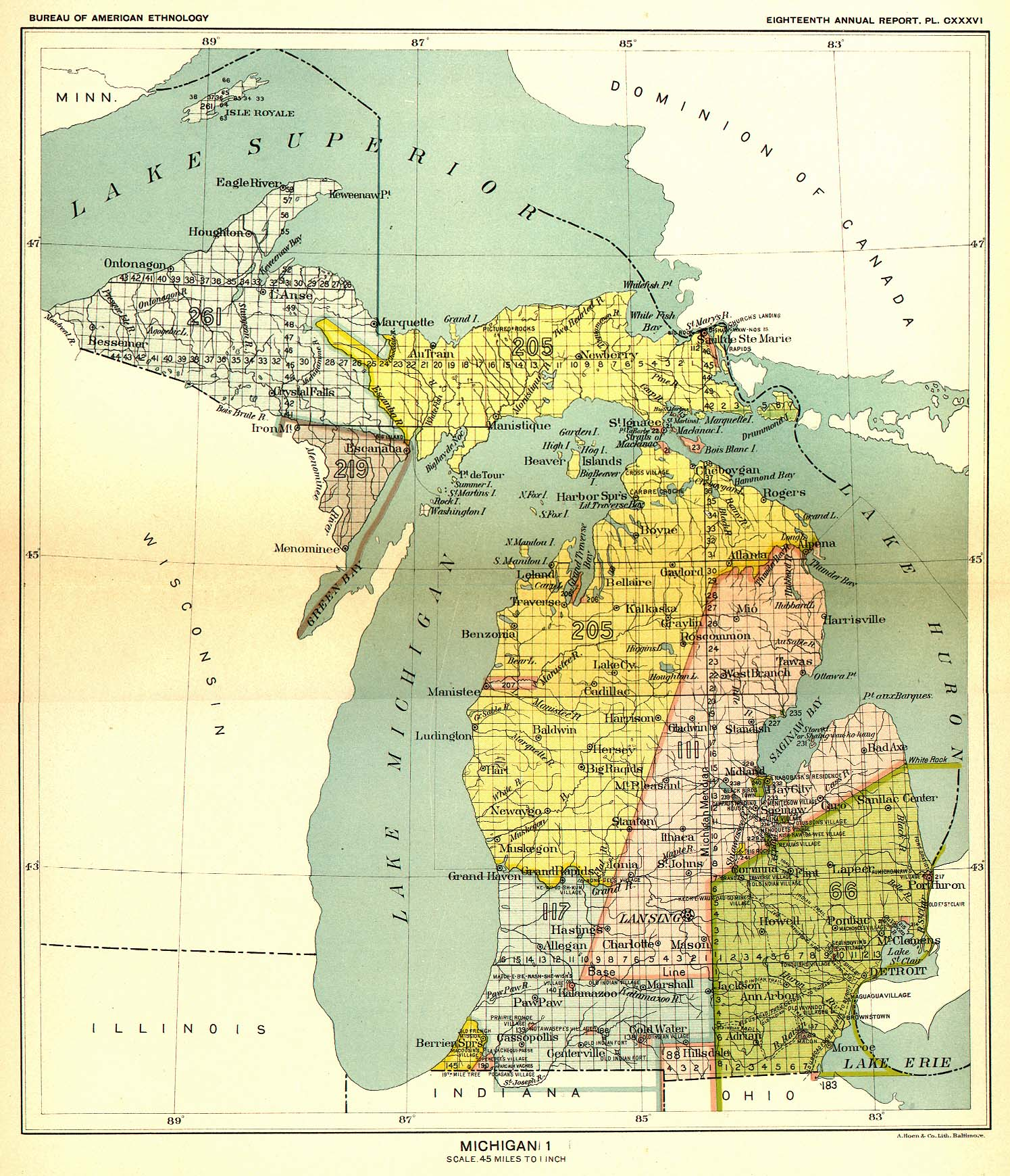
The 1821 treaty ceded the L-shaped gray area in southwest Michigan, as well as land around the southern coast of Lake Michigan.

The Treaty of Chicago may refer to either of two treaties made and signed in the settlement that became Chicago, Illinois, between the United States and the Odawa (anglicized Ottawa), Ojibwe (anglicized Chippewa), and Bodéwadmi (anglicized Potawatomi) (collectively, Council of Three Fires) Native American peoples. The first was in 1821 and the second in 1833.

== Background ==
In 1795, in a then minor part of the Treaty of Greenville, a Native American confederation granted treaty rights to the United States in a six-mile parcel of land at the mouth of the Chicago River. (Note: Six square miles centered at the mouth of the "Chikago River". See Article 3 item 14 within the text of the treaty.) This was followed by the 1816 Treaty of St. Louis, which ceded additional land in the Chicago area, including the Chicago Portage.

== 1821 Treaty of Chicago ==
The first treaty of Chicago was signed by Michigan Territorial Governor Lewis Cass and Solomon Sibley for the United States and representatives of the Ojibwe, Ottawa, and Potawatomi (Council of Three Fires) on August 29, 1821, and proclaimed on March 25, 1822. The treaty ceded to the United States all lands in Michigan Territory south of the Grand River, with the exception of several small reservations. Also ceded by the Native Americans was a tract of land, an easement between Detroit and Chicago (through Indiana and Illinois), around the southern coast of Lake Michigan, and specific Native Americans were also granted property rights to defined parcels.

Potawatomi Chief Metea gave the following speech in defense of his land at the signing of the Treaty of Chicago:

My Father,—We have listened to what you have said. We shall now retire to our camps and consult upon it. You will hear nothing more from us at present.

[This is a uniform custom of all the Native Americans. When the council was again convened, Metea continued.]

We meet you here to-day, because we had promised it, to tell you our minds, and what we have agreed upon among ourselves. You will listen to us with a good mind, and believe what we say. You know that we first came to this country, a long time ago, and when we sat ourselves down upon it, we met with a great many hardships and difficulties. Our country was then very large; but it has dwindled away to a small spot, and you wish to purchase that! This has caused us to reflect much upon what you have told us; and we have, therefore, brought all the chiefs and warriors, and the young men and women and children of our tribe, that one part may not do what others object to, and that all may be witnesses of what is going forward. You know your children. Since you first came among them, they have listened to your words with an attentive ear, and have always hearkened to your counsels. Whenever you have had a proposal to make to us, whenever you have had a favor to ask of us, we have always lent a favorable ear, and our invariable answer has been 'yes.' This you know! A long time has passed since we first came upon our lands, and our old people have all sunk into their graves. They had sense. We are all young and foolish, and do not wish to do anything that they would not approve, were they living. We are fearful we shall offend their spirits, if we sell our lands; and we are fearful we shall offend you, if we do not sell them. This has caused us great perplexity of thought, because we have counselled among ourselves, and do not know how we can part with the land. Our country was given to us by the Great Spirit, who gave it to us to hunt upon, to make our cornfields upon, to live upon, and to make down our beds upon when we die. And he would never forgive us, should we bargain it away. When you first spoke to us for lands at St. Mary's, we said we had a little, and agreed to sell you a piece of it; but we told you we could spare no more. Now you ask us again. You are never satisfied! We have sold you a great tract of land already; but it is not enough! We sold it to you for the benefit of your children, to farm and to live upon. We have now but little left. We shall want it all for ourselves. We know not how long we may live, and we wish to have some lands for our children to hunt upon. You are gradually taking away our hunting-grounds. Your children are driving us before them. We are growing uneasy. What lands you have, you may retain forever; but we shall sell no more. You think, perhaps, that I speak in passion; but my heart is good towards you. I speak like one of your own children. I am an Indian, a red-skin, and live by hunting and fishing, but my country is already too small; and I do not know how to bring up my children, if I give it all away. We sold you a fine tract of land at St. Mary's. We said to you then, it was enough to satisfy your children, and the last we should sell: and we thought it would be the last you would ask for. We have now told you what we had to say. It is what was determined on, in a council among ourselves; and what I have spoken, is the voice of my nation. On this account, all our people have come here to listen to me; but do not think we have a bad opinion of you. Where should we get a bad opinion of you? We speak to you with a good heart, and the feelings of a friend. You are acquainted with this piece of land—the country we live in. Shall we give it up? Take notice, it is a small piece of land, and if we give it away, what will become of us? The Great Spirit, who has provided it for our use, allows us to keep it, to bring up our young men and support our families. We should incur his anger, if we bartered it away. If we had more land, you should get more; but our land has been wasting away ever since the white people became our neighbors, and we have now hardly enough left to cover the bones of our tribe. You are in the midst of your red children. What is due to us in money, we wish, and will receive at this place; and we want nothing more. We all shake hands with you. Behold our warriors, our women, and children. Take pity on us and on our words.

== 1833 Treaty of Chicago ==
The second Treaty of Chicago granted the United States government all land west of Lake Michigan to Lake Winnebago in modern-day Wisconsin. It included lands that are part of modern-day Illinois, as well. The 1833 treaty had Native Americans (Chippewa, Odawa, and Potowatomi) in return receive promises of various cash payments and tracts of land west of the Mississippi River.

== See also ==
- List of treaties between the Potawatomi and the United States
