= List of treaties of the United States =

This is a list of treaties to which the United States has been a party or which have had direct relevance to U.S. history.

== Pre-Revolutionary War treaties ==
Before the United States Declaration of Independence in 1776, the sovereign of the United Kingdom and the leaders of various North American colonies negotiated treaties that affected the territory of what would later become the United States.

- 1621 – Wampanoag Treaty
- 1638 – Treaty of Hartford
- 1646 – Treaty of 1646
- 1677 – Treaty of 1677
- 1701 – Nanfan Treaty
- 1722 – Great Treaty of 1722
- 1726 – Deed in Trust from Three of the Five Nations of Indians to the Chancellor
- 1744 – Treaty of Lancaster
- 1752 – Treaty of Logstown
- 1754 – Treaty of Albany
- 1758 – Treaty of Easton
- 1760 – Treaty of Pittsburgh
- 1763 – Treaty of Paris
- 1768 – Treaty of Hard Labour
- 1768 – Treaty of Fort Stanwix
- 1770 – Treaty of Lochaber
- 1774 – Treaty of Camp Leona

== U.S. international treaties ==
These are treaties that the United States has made with other sovereign international states. This is mostly to distinguish them from the next category. Under the treaty clause of the United States Constitution, treaties come into effect upon final ratification by the President of the United States, provided that a two–thirds majority of the United States Senate concurs.

=== 1776–1799 ===
- 1776 – Model Treaty passed by the Continental Congress becomes the template for its future international treaties
- 1776 – Treaty of Watertown – a military treaty between the newly formed United States and the St. John's and Mi'kmaq First Nations of Nova Scotia, two peoples of the Wabanaki Confederacy.
- 1778 – Treaty of Alliance – American Revolutionary War alliance with the Kingdom of France
- 1778 – Treaty of Amity and Commerce – with France
- 1778 – Treaty of Fort Pitt – with Lenapes (Delawares)
- 1782 – Treaty of Amity and Commerce – with Dutch Republic
- 1783 – Treaty of Amity and Commerce – with Sweden
- 1783 – Treaty of Paris – ended the American Revolutionary War
- 1785 – Treaty of Amity and Commerce – with Prussia
- 1786 – Treaty of Friendship – with Morocco
- 1794 – Treaty of Canandaigua (Pickering Treaty) – negotiated by Pickering for George Washington with Red Jacket, Cornplanter, Handsome Lake, and fifty other Iroquois leaders by which they were forced to cede much of their land to the United States. Britain had ceded all its claims to land in the colonies without consulting the Iroquois or other Native American allies.
- 1794 – Jay Treaty (Treaty of London) – attempts to settle post-Revolution disputes with Great Britain. Provided the British Army to evacuate the Northwest Territory and to provide most favored nation status between Britain and America in exchange for international arbitration of the U.S.-Canada border and wartime debts. Opposed by Jeffersonian Republicans.
- 1795 - Treaty of Friendship - with the Regency of Algiers
- 1795 – Treaty of Greenville – Ended the Northwest Indian War and opened most of Ohio to white settlement
- 1795 – Treaty with Tripoli
- 1795 – Pinckney's Treaty (Treaty of Madrid or Treaty of San Lorenzo) – defines boundaries of U.S. with Spanish Florida and Americans granted navigation rights of the Mississippi
- 1796 – Treaty with Tripoli – tribute payments to Tripoli to protect Americans from seizure and ransom
- 1797 – Treaty with Tunis – increases tribute payments to Tripoli

=== 1800–1849 ===
- 1800 – Convention of 1800 (Treaty of Mortefontaine) – Ends the Quasi War between France and the U.S.
- 1803 – Louisiana Purchase Treaty – Acquire Louisiana Territory from the French First Republic.
- 1805 – Treaty with Tripoli – Secured release of Americans being held in Tripoli, proclaimed peace and amity, and ended the First Barbary War.
- 1814 – Treaty of Ghent – Ends the War of 1812 between the U.S. and Great Britain, returning the two countries to the status quo ante bellum.
- 1815 – Commercial treaty with Great Britain – Established free trade between the United States, England, and much of the British Empire (Ireland was among the areas excluded)
- 1817 – Rush–Bagot Treaty – The United States and Great Britain agree to demilitarize the Great Lakes.
- 1818 – Treaty of 1818 – resolved boundary issues between U.S. and Great Britain and demilitarized the border.
- 1819 – Adams–Onís Treaty – purchase of Florida from the Spanish Empire and established the border with New Spain.
- 1824 – Russo-American Treaty – gave Russian claims on land off the Northwest Pacific coast of North America (north of the Oregon Country)
- 1824 – Anderson–Gual Treaty – between U.S. and Gran Colombia; first bilateral treaty with another American country
- 1827 - Swedish–American Treaty (1827) - between the Kingdoms of Sweden and Norway and the United States
- 1828 – Treaty of Limits – between Mexico and the U.S.; confirms the boundary agreed to with Spain in the Adams–Onís Treaty.
- 1830 – Treaty with the Ottoman Port Also see Capitulations of the Ottoman Empire
- 1831 – Franco-American Treaty of 1831 – France agreed to pay reparations of 25 million francs for damage to American shipping during the Napoleonic Wars (ratified in 1835 under Victor de Broglie's government – see July Monarchy)
- 1833 – Siamese–American Treaty of Amity and Commerce – a commercial treaty between the Kingdom of Siam and the United States, first treaty with an East Asian nation
- 1833 – Treaty with Muscat
- 1835 – Treaty of New Echota – between U.S. government officials and representatives of a minority Cherokee political faction, the Treaty Party
- 1842 – Webster–Ashburton Treaty – ended the Aroostook War and settles boundary disputes between the U.S. and Canada
- 1844 - Tyler-Texas Treaty - Between the US and the Republic of Texas. Signed on April 12, 1844, was framed to induct Texas into the Union as a territory.
- 1844 – Treaty of Wanghia – between the U.S. and Qing Dynasty. Establishes five U.S. treaty ports in China with extraterritoriality. Imposes the first unequal treaty on the dynasty.
- 1846 – Mallarino–Bidlack Treaty with the Republic of New Granada (Colombia)
- 1846 – Oregon Treaty – brought an end to the Oregon boundary dispute by settling competing American and British claims to the Oregon Country
- 1847 – Treaty of Cahuenga – ends the Mexican–American War in Alta California
- 1848 – Treaty of Guadalupe Hidalgo – fully ends the Mexican–American War; sets the Rio Grande as the boundary between Mexico and Texas and cedes much of northern Mexico to the United States.
- 1849 – Treaty of Friendship, Commerce and Navigation – Treaty between the Hawaiian Kingdom and the United States

=== 1850–1899 ===
- 1850 – Clayton–Bulwer Treaty – U.S. and United Kingdom agree not to colonize Central America
- 1851 – Treaty of Fort Laramie – with the Cheyenne, Sioux, Arapaho, Crow, Assiniboine, Mandan, Hidatsa, and Arikara Nations
- 1851 – California Indian Reservations and Cessions – 18 lost treaties of California
- 1854 – Convention of Kanagawa – forcibly opens Japan to American trade
- 1855 – Canadian–American Reciprocity Treaty – with Canada on trade and tariffs
- 1855 – Treaty of Detroit – U. S. and Ottawa and Chippewa Nations of Indians which severed the link between the two Native American groups for further treaty negotiations and prepared the way for allotment of tribal land to individuals.
- 1856 – American–Siamese Treaty of Amity and Commerce – granted extraterritorial rights and low import duty for the Americans in Siam.
- 1858 – Treaty of Amity and Commerce, also known as Harris Treaty – forces the opening of treaty ports on Japan
- 1858 – Treaty of Tientsin – with China after the Second Opium War; established peace, amity, and commerce
- 1862 – Treaty of Commerce and Navigation – with Ottoman Empire
- 1864 – First Geneva Convention – established rules for the treatment of battlefield casualties and sick and wounded combatants
- 1867 – Alaska Purchase – U.S. buys Alaska from Russia
- 1868 – Burlingame Treaty – with China; established improved relations
- 1868 – Naturalization Convention – with North German Confederation; first recognition by a European power of the legal right of its subjects to become American citizens
- 1868 – Naturalization Convention – with Belgium
- 1868 – Treaty of Bosque Redondo – with the Navajo ending the Navajo Wars
- 1868 – Treaty of Fort Laramie – with the Sioux and Arapaho ending Red Cloud's War.
- 1869 – Naturalization Convention – with Sweden and Norway.
- 1870 – Naturalization Convention – with United Kingdom
- 1871 – Treaty of Washington – settles grievances between the U.S. and Canada including the Alabama Claims
- 1872 – Naturalization Convention – with Denmark
- 1883 – Paris Convention for the Protection of Industrial Property – intellectual property systems, including patents, of any contracting state become accessible to the nationals of other states party to the Convention
- 1886 – Berne Convention for the Protection of Literary and Artistic Works (ratified by U.S. in 1989)
- 1898 – Sixth Treaty of Paris – ends the Spanish–American War
- 1899 – Hague Conventions – one of the first formal statements of the laws of war

=== 1900–1949 ===
- 1900 – Treaty between Spain and the United States for Cession of Outlying Islands of the Philippines. Concluded November 7, 1900; ratification advised by Senate January 22, 1901 .. ratified by the President January 30, 1901; ratifications exchanged March 23, 1901; proclaimed March 23, 1901.
- 1901 – Hay–Pauncefote Treaty – nullified Clayton–Bulwer Treaty in exchange for free access to build a canal across Central America
- 1901 – Boxer Protocol, Peace Agreement between the Great Powers and China – one of the Unequal Treaties with China
- 1902 – Naturalization Convention – with Haiti
- 1903 – Hay–Herrán Treaty – the U.S. attempt to acquire a lease on Panama from Colombia (not ratified by Colombia)
- 1903 – Hay–Bunau-Varilla Treaty – establishes the Panama Canal Zone
- 1903 – Treaty of Relations – with the Republic of Cuba
- 1905 – Treaty of Portsmouth – ends Russo-Japanese War; negotiated by President Theodore Roosevelt
- 1905 – Taft–Katsura Agreement – Japan and U.S. agree on spheres of influence in Asia
- 1906 – Second Geneva Convention – treatment of wounded, sick and shipwrecked members of armed forces at sea
- 1906 – Inter-American Convention Establishing the Status of Naturalized Citizens Who Again Take Up Residence in the Country of Their Origin
- 1907 – Gentlemen's Agreement – limiting Japanese immigration to the U.S.
- 1907 – Naturalization Convention – with Peru
- 1908 – Naturalization Convention – with Portugal
- 1908 – Naturalization Convention – with El Salvador
- 1908 – Naturalization Convention – with Honduras
- 1908 – Naturalization Convention – with Nicaragua
- 1908 – Naturalization Convention – with Uruguay
- 1909 – Boundary Waters Treaty – regulates water quantity and water quality along the boundary between Canada and the United States.
- 1911 – Naturalization Convention – with Costa Rica
- 1911 – North Pacific Fur Seal Convention of 1911 – first international treaty for wildlife preservation
- 1912 – First International Opium Convention – first international drug control treaty
- 1916 – Treaty of the Danish West Indies – U.S. purchase of the Danish West Indies, renaming them the United States Virgin Islands
- 1917 – Lansing–Ishii Agreement – trade treaty between the U.S. and Japan
- 1918 – Migratory Bird Treaty – Environment treaty with the United Kingdom representing Canada, to protect birds which migrate between Canada and the U.S.
- 1919 – Treaty of Versailles – ended the state of war between Germany and the Allied Powers and established the League of Nations. Ultimately not ratified by the U.S. Senate.
- 1920 – Svalbard Treaty – recognizes Norwegian sovereignty over Svalbard and regulates its open access, economic activities, environmental protection, taxation and demilitarization
- 1921 – Peace Treaty – separate World War I peace agreement between United States and Austria
- 1921 – Treaty of Berlin – separate World War I peace agreement between United States and Germany
- 1921 – Peace Treaty – separate World War I peace agreement between United States and Hungary
- 1922 – Washington Naval Treaty – limits the naval armaments race, supplement to restrict submarine warfare and ban chemical warfare was rejected by France.
- 1925 – Anglo-American Convention – American acceptance of the provisions of the Mandate for Palestine and supervision of British performance as mandatory of the Mandate for Palestine.
- 1925 – Hay-Quesada Treaty – America accepts Cuban ownership of Isle of Pines.
- 1928 – Kellogg–Briand Pact – calls "for the renunciation of war as an instrument of national policy"
- 1929 – Geneva Convention on Prisoners of War – establishes rules for the treatment of prisoners of war
- 1929 – Warsaw Convention for the Unification of certain rules relating to international carriage by air – regulates civilian air travel
- 1930 – London Naval Treaty – regulates submarine warfare and shipbuilding
- 1930 – Convention Between the United States and Great Britain – Definitely delimits the boundary between North Borneo (then a British protectorate) and the Philippine archipelago (then a U.S. Territory)
- 1934 – Treaty of Relations – agreements between United States and Cuba s:United States – Cuban Agreements and Treaty of 1934
- 1937 – Treaty Defining Liability for Military Service, etc. – with Lithuania
- 1943 – Treaty between the United States and China for the Relinquishment of Extraterritorial Rights in China – relinquishes extraterritorial rights granted to the United States in China under the Treaty of Wanghia.
- 1944 – Bretton Woods Agreement – establishes the rules for commercial and financial relations among the major industrial states
- 1945 – UN Charter – establishes the United Nations
- 1946 – Bermuda Agreement – bilateral treaty on Civil Aviation between U.S. and United Kingdom
- 1946 – Treaty of Manila – United States recognizes independence of the Republic of the Philippines
- 1947 – General Agreement on Tariffs and Trade (GATT) – establishes rules for international trade
- 1947 – Paris Peace Treaties – establishes peace in Europe after World War II.
- 1947 – Inter-American Treaty of Reciprocal Assistance (Rio Treaty) – Western Hemisphere mutual defense
- 1947 – Convention on International Civil Aviation (Chicago Convention) – establishes International Civil Aviation Organization (ICAO)
- 1949 – North Atlantic Treaty (Treaty of Washington) – establishes NATO mutual defense organization
- 1949 – Fourth Geneva Convention – establishes rules for the protection of civilians during times of war
- 1949 – Treaty of Friendship, Commerce and Navigation – establishes amiable relations between the U.S. and the Republic of China.

=== 1950–1999 ===
- 1951 – Convention on the Prevention and Punishment of the Crime of Genocide – (with U.S. qualifications)
- 1951 – Treaty of San Francisco – a peace treaty between the Allied Powers and Japan; ends the Pacific conflict of World War II
- 1951 – Mutual Defense Treaty – alliance between the Republic of the Philippines and the United States of America
- 1951 – Treaty of Security between the United States and Japan (updated 1960)
- 1952 – ANZUS Treaty – mutual defense alliance between Australia, New Zealand, and the United States
- 1953 – Mutual Defense Treaty – Created an alliance with South Korea, and established the basis of South Korean adherence with U.S. government consultations on North Korean policy
- 1954 – U.S. and Japan Mutual Defense Assistance Agreement
- 1954 – Southeast Asia Collective Defense Treaty – creates SEATO mutual defense organization
- 1954 – Sino-American Mutual Defense Treaty – alliance between the United States and Taiwan
- 1955 – Central Treaty Organization (CENTO), formerly known as Middle East Treaty Organization (METO), also known as the Baghdad Pact – creates CENTO mutual defense organization
- 1955 – The Open Skies Treaty – allow access to other nations' military activities by means of aerial surveillance flights
- 1955 – Treaty of Amity, Economic Relations and Consular Rights – provided friendly diplomatic relations between the United States and Iran.
- 1956 – Dutch–American Friendship Treaty
- 1957 – International Atomic Energy Treaty (US PL 85–177)
- 1958 – Mutual Defense Agreement – commenced the "Special Relationship" with the United Kingdom
- 1960 – Treaty of Mutual Cooperation and Security – mutual defense treaty with Japan
- 1961 – Antarctic Treaty – governs international relations in Antarctica
- 1961 – Columbia River Treaty (ratified in 1964) – with Canada to manage water in the Columbia River valley
- 1961 – Vienna Convention on Diplomatic Relations – specifies diplomatic immunity
- 1961 – Alliance for Progress – economic cooperation treaty with Latin America
- 1961 – Single Convention on Narcotic Drugs
- 1962 – Nassau Agreement – defense treaty with United Kingdom
- 1962 – Joint Declaration on Commercial Relations – with the European Economic Community, signed March 7, 1962
- 1963 – Vienna Convention on Consular Relations – treaty on consular protocol
- 1963 – Vienna Convention on Civil Liability for Nuclear Damage – provides liability in the case of a nuclear accident
- 1963 – Partial Nuclear Test Ban Treaty – Prohibited nuclear weapons testing except for underground tests.
- 1966 – Treaty of Amity and Economic Relations – commercial treaty with the Kingdom of Thailand
- 1966 – International Convention on the Elimination of All Forms of Racial Discrimination – treaty prohibiting racial discrimination.
- 1967 – Outer Space Treaty – Basis for space law. Prohibits use of weapons of mass destruction, including nuclear weapons, in space
- 1968 – Nuclear Non-Proliferation Treaty – Prohibits signatories from acquiring nuclear weapons and commits nuclear-armed states to nuclear disarmament.
- 1968 – Protocol Relating to the Status of Refugees
- 1969 – Vienna Convention on the Law of Treaties – provides rules on making international treaties. The United States is not a party to this treaty.
- 1970 – Patent Cooperation Treaty (PCT) – Provides unified procedure on patent applications
- 1970 – Boundary Treaty – settles U.S. – Mexico border on Rio Grande
- 1971 – Geneva Phonograms Convention – provides copyright protections for audio recordings
- 1971 – Convention on Psychotropic Substances – restricts the import and export of psychotropic drugs.
- 1972 – Anti-Ballistic Missile Treaty (ABM Treaty) (U.S. withdrew in 2002) – limited anti-ballistic missiles
- 1972 – SALT I (Strategic Arms Limitation Treaty) – provided limitations on new intercontinental ballistic missile launchers and submarine-launched ballistic missiles
- 1972 – Biological Weapons Convention – prohibited production of biological weapons
- 1972 – Convention on the Prevention of Marine Pollution by Dumping of Wastes and Other Matter (London Convention) (implemented by U.S., but not signed) – regulates waste disposal from vessels at sea
- 1972 – Great Lakes Water Quality Agreement – regulates water quality along the U.S.-Canada border
- 1973 – Paris Peace Accords – with North Vietnam ending the Vietnam War
- 1974 – Threshold Test Ban Treaty – limited nuclear testing to 150 kilotons per year
- 1977 – Torrijos-Carter Treaties – transfer of Panama Canal to Panama
- 1978 – Camp David Accords – peace treaty between Israel and Egypt; negotiated and signed in U.S.
- 1978 – Great Lakes Water Quality Agreement – regulates water quality along the U.S.-Canada border
- 1978 – Treaty on maritime boundaries between the United Mexican States and the United States of America
- 1979 – SALT II (not ratified by U.S.) – sought to limit production of strategic nuclear weapons
- 1979 – Treaty of Tarawa – recognizes sovereignty of Kiribati over disputed islands
- 1980 – Maritime Boundary Treaty – settles disputed claims and establishes the maritime boundary between American Samoa and the Cook Islands
- 1980 – Hague Convention on the Civil Aspects of International Child Abduction
- 1980 – Treaty of Tokehega – settles disputed claims and establishes the maritime boundary between American Samoa and Tokelau
- 1985 – Plaza Accord – G-5 agreed to devalue the U.S. dollar in relation to the Japanese yen and German Deutsche Mark by intervening in currency markets
- 1986 – Vienna Convention on the Law of Treaties between States and International Organizations or Between International Organizations
- 1986 – United Nations Convention on Contracts for the International Sale of Goods – regulates contracts on international trade
- 1988 – Intermediate-Range Nuclear Forces Treaty (INF) – dismantled all short-range and intermediate-range ballistic missiles of the United States and the Soviet Union.
- 1988 – United Nations Convention Against Illicit Traffic in Narcotic Drugs and Psychotropic Substances – provides legal mechanisms on enforcement of previous narcotics treaties
- 1988 – United Nations Convention Against Torture – prohibited use of torture and cruel and unusual punishment
- 1989 – Montreal Protocol on Substances That Deplete the Ozone Layer
- 1990 – Treaty on the Final Settlement with Respect to Germany – final World War II peace with Germany and Allies
- 1991 – Treaty on Conventional Armed Forces in Europe – Signed by all 16 NATO members and Warsaw Pact nations; ratified by all 16 NATO states, the eight successor states to the USSR that have territory in Europe, and the six former Warsaw Pact nations
- 1991 – START I (Strategic Arms Reduction Treaty) – limited amounts of nuclear warheads, ballistic missiles, and strategic bombers between the United States and the Soviet Union
- 1992 – International Covenant on Civil and Political Rights (ratified with qualifications by U.S. Senate) – commits signatories to respect civil and political rights
- 1992 – United Nations Framework Convention on Climate Change – limited carbon emissions
- 1993 – Oslo Accords – between the Palestine Liberation Organization and Israel; negotiated with U.S. involvement
- 1993 – Chemical Weapons Convention – prohibits chemical weapons
- 1993 – START II (ratified by U.S. and Russia) – prohibited intercontinental ballistic missiles with multiple independently targetable reentry vehicles
- 1994 – North American Free Trade Agreement (NAFTA) – removed tariffs and trade barriers between the United States, Mexico, and Canada
- 1994 – Convention on the Limitation Period in the International Sale of Goods – regulated contracts on sales of goods
- 1994 – Kremlin accords – US and USSR missile and nuclear weapons control; ended preprogrammed targeting of strategic nuclear missiles
- 1994 – United Nations Convention on the Law of the Sea (LOS) (not ratified by U.S.)
- 1995 – Dayton Agreement – ended the Bosnian War and determines the future of Bosnia and Herzegovina; negotiated and signed in U.S.
- 1995 – General Agreement on Trade in Services (GATS) – extended multilateral trade to the service sector
- 1996 – WIPO Copyright Treaty – protects computer programs and databases
- 1996 – WIPO Performances and Phonograms Treaty
- 1996 – Comprehensive Nuclear-Test-Ban Treaty (signed but not ratified by U.S.) – completely prohibits nuclear weapon testing
- 1997 – Worldwide Chemical Weapons Convention
- 1998 – Rome Statute of the International Criminal Court (unsigned by the U.S.) – established the International Criminal Court
- 1999 – Convention for the Unification of Certain Rules for International Carriage by Air – modified the 1929 Warsaw Convention

=== 2000–current ===
Year	Treaty name	Ratified	Ratification Year	Expiry	Other Nation(s)	Description
2000	Patent Law Treaty	Yes	2013		numerous	
2001	Budapest Convention on Cybercrime	Yes	2006		numerous	
2001	Bonn Agreement	No			United Nations	Provided plans for the reconstruction of Afghanistan after the U.S. invasion
2002	SORT (Strategic Offensive Reductions Treaty)	Yes	2003	2011	Russia	Or the Moscow Treaty. Limits the nuclear arsenals of Russia and the U.S
2004	International Treaty on Plant Genetic Resources for Food and Agriculture	No			numerous	Or the International Seed Treaty.
2005	Dominican Republic-Central America Free Trade Agreement	became law	2005		Costa Rica Dominican Republic El Salvador Guatemala Honduras Nicaragua	
2008	U.S.–Iraq Status of Forces Agreement	No		2011	Iraq	Agreed to withdraw U.S. military forces from Iraq by 2011.
2010	New START (The New Strategic Arms Reduction Treaty)	Yes	2011	2026	Russia	
2012	United States–Korea Free Trade Agreement	Yes	2011		South Korea	Or KORUS FTA
2012	U.S.–Afghanistan Strategic Partnership Agreement	No			Afghanistan	Provided agreement for withdrawal of U.S. forces from the War in Afghanistan.
2013	UN Arms Treaty	No			numerous	Regulates the international arms trade
2015	Paris Agreement	No		Withdrew for a second time 2025	numerous	Climate change mitigation treaty aiming to keep global temperatures from rising 2 °C above pre-industrial levels. Withdrew in 2020, readmitted in 2021. Withdrew again in 2025.
2015	Joint Comprehensive Plan of Action	No		Withdrew 2018	China Iran Russia European Union	Or Iran nuclear deal. Regulated the Iranian nuclear program to prevent nuclear weapons development.
2016	Kigali Amendment to the Montreal Protocol	Yes	2022		numerous	Regulates hydrofluorocarbons (HFCs)
2018	United States–Mexico–Canada Agreement (USMCA)	became law	2020		Mexico Canada	Trade agreement designed to replace NAFTA
2025	Armenia–United States Strategic Partnership Charter	became law	2025		Armenia	Strategic Partnership Agreement

== U.S.–Native American treaties ==
From 1778 to 1871, the United States government entered into more than 500 treaties with the Native American tribes; many Native American activists argue that most or all of these treaties have since been violated in some way or outright broken by the U.S. government, with Native Americans and First Nations peoples still fighting for their treaty rights in federal courts and at the United Nations.

In addition to treaties, which are ratified by the U.S. Senate and signed by the U.S. President, there were also Acts of Congress and Executive Orders which dealt with land agreements. The U.S. military and representatives of a tribe, or sub unit of a tribe, signed documents which were understood at the time to be treaties, rather than armistices, ceasefires and truces.

The entries from 1784 to 1895 were initially created by information gathered by Charles C. Royce and published in the U.S. Serial Set, Number 4015, 56th Congress, 1st Session, in 1899. The purpose of the Schedule of Indian Land Cessions was to indicate the location of each cession by or reservation for the Indian Tribes. Royce's column headings are titled: "Date, Where or how concluded, Reference, Tribe, Description of cession or reservation, historical data and remarks, Designation of cession on map, Number, Location".

The Ratified Indian Treaties that were transferred from the U.S. State Department to the National Archives were recently conserved and imaged for the first time, and in 2020 made available online with additional context at the Indigenous Digital Archive's Treaties Explorer, or DigiTreaties.org.

=== 1778–1799 ===
Year	Date	Treaty name	Alternative Treaty name	Statutes	Land cession reference (Royce Area)	Tribe(s)
1778	September 17	Treaty of Fort Pitt	Treaty with the Delawares	7 Stat. 13		Lenape
1784	October 22	Treaty of Fort Stanwix	Treaty with the Six Nations	7 Stat. 15	1, 2	Six Nations (Mohawk, Seneca, Oneida, Tuscarora, Cayuga, Onondaga)
1785	January 21	Treaty of Fort McIntosh	Treaty with the Wyandot	7 Stat. 16		Wyandot, Lenape, Ojibwe, Odawa
1785	November 28	Treaty of Hopewell	Treaty with the Cherokee	7 Stat. 18	3	Cherokee
1786	January 3	Treaty of Hopewell	Treaty with the Choctaw	7 Stat. 21		Choctaw
1786	January 10	Treaty of Hopewell	Treaty with the Chickasaw	7 Stat. 24		Chickasaw
1786	January 31	Treaty of Fort Finney	Treaty with the Shawnee	7 Stat. 26		Shawnee
1788	September 3	Ordinance of Congress	Moravian Indian Grants	v34 pp 485–487	4, 5, 6	Christian Indians
1789	January 9	Treaty of Fort Harmar	Treaty with the Wyandot, etc.	7 Stat. 28		Wyandot, Lenape, Council of Three Fires (Ojibwe, Odawa, Potawatomi), Sauk
1789	January 9	Treaty of Fort Harmar	Treaty with the Six Nations	7 Stat. 33		Six Nations (Mohawk, Seneca, Oneida, Tuscarora, Cayuga, Onondaga)
1790	August 7	Treaty of New York	Treaty with the Creek	7 Stat. 35	7	Creek
1791	March 3	Act of Congress		1 Stat. 221		Piankeshaw, Kaskaskia
1791	July 2	Treaty of Holston	Treaty with the Cherokee	7 Stat. 39	8	Cherokee
1792	February 17	Treaty of Philadelphia	Additional article to the Treaty with the Cherokee	7 Stat. 42		Cherokee
1792	April 23	Philadelphia Agreement	Agreement with the Five Nations of Indians			Five Nations (Seneca, Oneida, Tuscarora, Cayuga, Onondaga)
1794	June 26	Treaty of Holston	Treaty with the Cherokee	7 Stat. 43		Cherokee
1794	November 11	Treaty of Canandaigua	Treaty with the Six Nations, Pickering Treaty, Calico Treaty	7 Stat. 44	9, 10	Six Nations (Mohawk, Seneca, Oneida, Tuscarora, Cayuga, Onondaga)
1794	December 2	Treaty of Oneida	Treaty with the Oneida, etc.	7 Stat. 47		Five Nations (Seneca, Oneida, Tuscarora, Cayuga, Onondaga)
1795	August 3	Treaty of Greenville	Treaty with the Wyandot, etc.	7 Stat. 49	11, 12, 13, 14, 15, 16, 17, 18, 19, 20, 21, 22, 23, 24, 25, 26, 27	Wyandot, Lenape, Shawnee, Council of Three Fires (Chippewa, Sauk, Ottawa, Potawatomi), Miami, Eel River, Wea, Kickapoo, Piankeshaw, Kaskaskia
1796	May 31	Treaty of New York	Treaty with the Seven Nations of Canada	7 Stat. 55	28	Seven Nations of Canada (Akwesasne Mohawk, Kahnawake Mohawk, Anishinaabeg (Algonquin and Nipissing) and Mohawk of Oka, Odanak Abenaki, Becancour Abenaki, Jeune-Lorette Wyandot, Oswegatchie Onondaga)
1796	June 29	Treaty of Colerain	Treaty with the Creeks	7 Stat. 56		Creek
1797	March 29	Treaty of Albany	Relinquishment by the Mohawks	7 Stat. 61		Mohawk
1797	September 15	Genesee Agreement	Agreement with the Seneca, Big Tree Treaty	7 Stat. 601	29, 30, 31, 32, 33, 34, 35, 36, 37, 38, 39, 40, 41	Seneca
1798	June 1	Ratified Treaty Number 28	Convention Between the State of New York and the Oneida Indians			Oneida
1798	October 2	Treaty of Tellico	Treaty with the Cherokee	7 Stat. 62	42	Cherokee

=== 1800–1809 ===
Year	Date	Treaty name	Alternative treaty name	Statutes	Land cession reference (Royce Area)	Tribe(s)
1801	October 24	Treaty of Chickasaw Bluffs	Treaty with the Chickasaw	7 Stat. 65		Chickasaw
1801	December 17	Treaty of Fort Adams	Treaty with the Choctaw	7 Stat. 66	43	Choctaw
1802	June 16	Treaty of Fort Wilkinson	Treaty with the Creeks	7 Stat. 68	44	Creek
1802	June 30	Treaty of Buffalo Creek	Indenture with the Senecas	7 Stat. 70	45	Seneca
1802	June 30	Treaty of Buffalo Creek	Treaty with the Seneca	7 Stat. 72		Seneca
1802	October 17	Treaty of Fort Confederation	Provisional Convention with the Choctaws	7 Stat. 73	46	Choctaw
1803	June 7	Treaty of Fort Wayne	Treaty with the Delawares, etc.	7 Stat. 74		Lenape, Shawnee, Potawatomi, Miami, Eel River, Wea, Kickapoo, Piankeshaw, Kaskaskia
1803	August 7	Treaty of Vincennes	Relinquishment of land to the United States by the Eel-Rivers, Wyandots, Piankeshaws, Kaskaskias, and Kickapoos, Treaty with the Eel River, etc.	7 Stat. 77	47	Eel River, Wyandot, Piankeshaw, Kaskaskia, Kickapoo
1803	August 13	Treaty of Vincennes	Treaty with the Kaskaskia	7 Stat. 78	48	Kaskaskia
1803	August 31	Treaty of Hoe Buckintoopa	Treaty with the Choctaw	7 Stat. 80		Choctaw
1804	August 18	Treaty of Vincennes	Treaty with the Delawares	7 Stat. 81	49	Lenape
1804	August 27	Treaty of Vincennes	Treaty with the Piankeshaw	7 Stat. 83		Piankeshaw
1804	October 24	Treaty of Tellico	Treaty with the Cherokee	7 Stat. 228	52	Cherokee
1804	November 3	Treaty of St. Louis	Treaty with the Sauk and Foxes	7 Stat. 84	50, 51	Sac and Fox
1805	July 4	Treaty of Fort Industry	Treaty with the Wyandot, etc.	7 Stat. 87	53, 54	Wyandot, Odawa, Ojibwe, Munsee, Lenape, Shawnee, Potawatomi
1805	July 23	Treaty of Chickasaw County	Treaty with the Chickasaw	7 Stat. 89	55	Chickasaw
1805	August 21	Treaty of Grouseland	Treaty with the Delawares, etc.	7 Stat. 91	56	Lenape, Potawatomi, Miami, Eel River, Wea
1805	September 23	Pike's Purchase	Treaty with the Sioux			Sioux
1805	October 25	Treaty of Tellico	Treaty with the Cherokee	7 Stat. 93	57	Cherokee
1805	October 27	Treaty of Tellico	Treaty with the Cherokee	7 Stat. 95	58, 59	Cherokee
1805	November 14	Treaty of Washington	Convention with the Creeks	7 Stat. 96	60	Creek
1805	November 16	Treaty of Mount Dexter	Treaty with the Choctaw	7 Stat. 98	61, 62	Choctaw
1805	December 30	Treaty of Vincennes	Treaty with the Piankashaw	7 Stat. 100	63	Piankeshaw
1806	January 7	Treaty of Washington	Convention with the Cherokee	7 Stat. 101	64, 65	Cherokee
1807	March 3	Act of Congress		7 Stat. 448		Lenape
1807	September 11	Treaty of Chickasaw Old Fields	Elucidation of the convention with the Cherokees of January 7, 1806	7 Stat. 103		Cherokee
1807	November 17	Treaty of Detroit	Treaty with the Ottawa, etc.	7 Stat. 105	66	Odawa, Ojibwe, Wyandot, Potawatomi
1808	November 10	Treaty of Fort Clark	Treaty with the Osage	7 Stat. 107	67, 68, 69	Osage
1808	November 25	Treaty of Brownstown	Treaty with the Chippewa, etc.	7 Stat. 112	70	Council of Three Fires (Ojibwe, Odawa, Potawatomi), Wyandot, Shawnee
1809	February 28	Act of Congress		2 Stat. 527		Alabama
1809	February 28	Act of Congress		2 Stat. 527		Wyandot
1809	September 30	Treaty of Fort Wayne	Treaty with the Delawares, etc.	7 Stat. 113	71, 72, 73	Lenape, Potawatomi, Miami, Eel River
1809	September 30	Treaty of Fort Wayne, Addendum	Supplementary Treaty with the Miami, etc., Separate article with the Miamies and Eel-Rivers, forming part of the treaty of September 30, 1809	7 Stat. 115		Miami, Eel River
1809	October 26	Treaty of Vincennes	Convention with the Wea	7 Stat. 116		Wea
1809	December 9	Treaty with the Kickapoo		7 Stat. 117	74	Kickapoo

=== 1810–1819 ===
Year	Date	Treaty Name	Alternative Treaty Name	Statutes	Land cession reference (Royce Area)	Tribe(s)
1814	July 22	Treaty of Greenville	Treaty with the Wyandot, etc.	7 Stat. 118		Wyandot, Lenape, Shawnee, Seneca, Miami
1814	August 9	Treaty of Fort Jackson	Treaty with the Creeks, Articles of agreement and capitualtion with the Creeks	7 Stat. 120	75	Creek
1815	July 18	Treaty of Portage des Sioux	Treaty with the Potawatomi	7 Stat. 123		Potawatomi
1815	July 18	Treaty of Portage des Sioux	Treaty with the Piankashaw	7 Stat. 124		Piankeshaw
1815	July 19	Treaty of Portage des Sioux	Treaty with the Teton	7 Stat. 125		Lakota
1815	July 19	Treaty of Portage des Sioux	Treaty with the Sioux of the Lakes	7 Stat. 126		Mdewakantonwan Dakota
1815	July 19	Treaty of Portage des Sioux	Treaty with the Sioux of St. Peter's River	7 Stat. 127		Wahpekute Dakota, Wahpetonwan Dakota
1815	July 19	Treaty of Portage des Sioux	Treaty with the Yankton Sioux	7 Stat. 128		Ihanktonwan Dakota
1815	July 20	Treaty of Portage des Sioux	Treaty with the Omaha	7 Stat. 129		Omaha
1815	September 2	Treaty of Portage des Sioux	Treaty with the Kickapoo	7 Stat. 130		Kickapoo
1815	September 8	Treaty of Springwells	Treaty with the Wyandot, etc.	7 Stat. 131		Wyandot, Lenape, Seneca, Shawnee, Miami, Council of Three Fires (Ojibwe, Odawa, Potawatomi)
1815	September 12	Treaty of Portage des Sioux	Treaty with the Osage	7 Stat. 133		Osage
1815	September 13	Treaty of Portage des Sioux	Treaty with the Sauk	7 Stat. 134		Sac
1815	September 14	Treaty of Portage des Sioux	Treaty with the Foxes	7 Stat. 135		Fox
1815	September 16	Treaty of Portage des Sioux	Treaty with the Iowa	7 Stat. 136		Iowa
1815	October 28	Treaty of St. Louis	Treaty with the Kansa	7 Stat. 137		Kaw
1816	March 22	Treaty of Washington	Treaty with the Cherokee	7 Stat. 138	76	Cherokee
1816	March 22	Treaty of Washington	Convention with the Cherokee	7 Stat. 139		Cherokee
1816	May 13	Treaty of St. Louis	Treaty with the Sauk	7 Stat. 141		Sac
1816	June 1	Treaty of St. Louis	Treaty with the Sioux	7 Stat. 143		Wahpekute Dakota, Wahpetonwan Dakota, Wazikute Nakota
1816	June 3	Treaty of St. Louis	Treaty with the Winnebago	7 Stat. 144		Winnebago
1816	June 4	Treaty of Fort Harrison	Treaty with the Wea and Kickapoo	7 Stat. 145		Wea, Kickapoo
1816	August 24	Treaty of St. Louis	Treaty with the Ottawa, etc.	7 Stat. 146	77, 78, 78a	Council of Three Fires (Odawa, Ojibwe, Potawatomi)
1816	September 14	Treaty of Chickasaw Council House (Cherokee)	Treaty with the Cherokee	7 Stat. 148	79	Cherokee
1816	September 20	Treaty of Chickasaw Council House (Chickasaw)	Treaty with the Chickasaw	7 Stat. 150	80, 81	Chickasaw
1816	October 24	Treaty of Choctaw Trading House	Treaty with the Choctaw	7 Stat. 152	82	Choctaw
1817	March 30	Treaty of St. Louis	Treaty with the Menominee	7 Stat. 153		Menominee
1817	June 24	Treaty with the Oto		7 Stat. 154		Otoe, Missouri
1817	June 25	Treaty with the Ponca		7 Stat. 155		Ponca
1817	July 8	Treaty of Cherokee Agency	Treaty with the Cherokee	7 Stat. 156	83, 84, 85, 86	Cherokee
1817	September 29	Treaty of Fort Meigs	Treaty with the Wyandot, etc., Treaty of the Foot of the Rapids, Treaty of Miami Rapids	7 Stat. 160	87, 88, 89, 90, 91	Wyandot, Seneca, Lenape, Shawnee, Potawatomi, Odawa, Ojibwe
1818	January 3	Vincennes Contract	Agreement with the Piankeshaw			Piankeshaw
1818	January 22	Treaty of Creek Agency	Treaty with the Creeks	7 Stat. 171	92, 93	Creek
1818	June 18	Treaty of St. Louis	Treaty with the Grand Pawnee	7 Stat. 172		Chaui Pawnee
1818	June 19	Treaty of St. Louis	Treaty with the Noisy Pawnee	7 Stat. 173		Pawnee
1818	June 20	Treaty of St. Louis	Treaty with the Pawnee Republic	7 Stat. 174		Kitkehahki Pawnee
1818	June 22	Treaty of St. Louis	Treaty with the Pawnee Marhar	7 Stat. 175		Pawnee
1818	August 24	Treaty of St. Louis	Treaty with the Quapaw	7 Stat. 176	94	Quapaw
1818	September 17	Treaty of St. Mary's	Treaty with the Wyandot, etc.	7 Stat. 178		Wyandot, Seneca, Shawnee, Odawa
1818	September 20	Treaty of St. Mary's	Treaty with the Wyandot	7 Stat. 180	95, 96	Wyandot
1818	September 21	Treaty of Edwardsville	Treaty with the Peoria, etc.	7 Stat. 181	96a	Peoria, Kaskaskia, Michigamea, Cahokia, Tamaroa
1818	September 25	Treaty of St. Louis	Treaty with the Osage	7 Stat. 183	97	Osage
1818	October 2	Treaty of St. Mary's	Treaty with the Potawatomi	7 Stat. 185	98	Potawatomi
1818	October 2	Treaty of St. Mary's	Treaty with the Wea	7 Stat. 186		Wea
1818	October 3	Treaty of St. Mary's	Treaty with the Delawares	7 Stat. 188		Lenape
1818	October 6	Treaty of St. Mary's	Treaty with the Miami	7 Stat. 189	99	Miami
1818	October 19	Treaty of Old Town	Treaty with the Chickasaw	7 Stat. 192	100	Chickasaw
1819	February 27	Treaty of Washington	Treaty with the Cherokee	7 Stat. 195	101, 102, 103, 104, 105, 106, 107, 108, 109	Cherokee
1819	July 30	Treaty of Edwardsville	Treaty with the Kickapoo	7 Stat. 200	110	Kickapoo
1819	August 30	Treaty of Fort Harrison	Treaty with the Kickapoo	7 Stat. 202	110	Kickapoo
1819	September 24	Treaty of Saginaw	Treaty with the Chippewa	7 Stat. 203	111	Ojibwe

=== 1820–1829 ===
Year	Date	Treaty Name	Alternative Treaty Name	Statutes	Land cession reference (Royce Area)	Tribe(s)
1820	June 16	Treaty of Sault Ste. Marie	Treaty with the Chippewa	7 Stat. 206	112	Ojibwe
1820	July 6	Treaty of L'Arbor Croche and Michilimackinac	Treaty with the Ottawa and Chippewa	7 Stat. 207	113	Odawa, Ojibwe
1820	July 19	Treaty of St. Louis	Treaty with the Kickapoo	7 Stat. 208		Kickapoo
1820	August 11	Treaty of Vincennes	Treaty with the Wea	7 Stat. 209	114	Wea
1820	September 5	Treaty of Vincennes	Treaty with the Kickapoo of the Vermilion, Convention with the Kickapoo	7 Stat. 210		Kickapoo
1820	October 18	Treaty of Doak's Stand	Treaty with the Choctaw	7 Stat. 210	115	Choctaw
1821	January 8	Treaty of Indian Springs	Treaty with the Creeks	7 Stat. 215	116	Creek
1821	January 8	Treaty of Mineral Spring	Treaty with the Creeks, Articles of agreement with the Creeks	7 Stat. 217		Creek
1821	August 29	Treaty of Chicago	Treaty with the Ottawa, etc.	7 Stat. 218	117	Council of Three Fires (Odawa, Ojibwe, Potawatomi)
1822	August 31	Treaty of Fort Clark	Treaty with the Osage	7 Stat. 222		Great and Little Osage
1822	September 3	Treaty of St. Louis	Treaty with the Sauk and Foxes	7 Stat. 223		Sac and Fox
1823	March 3	Act of Congress	Moravian Indian Grants	3 Stat. 749	4, 5, 6	Christian Munsee
1823	September 3	Moscow Agreement	Agreement with the Seneca			Seneca
1823	September 18	Treaty of Moultrie Creek	Treaty with the Florida Tribes of Indians	7 Stat. 224	118, 119	Seminole
1824	May 26	Act of Congress	Moravian Indian Grants	4 Stat. 57	4, 5, 6	Christian Munsee
1824	August 4	Treaty of Washington	Treaty with the Sauk and Foxes	7 Stat. 229	120	Sac and Fox
1824	August 4	Treaty of Washington	Treaty with the Iowa	7 Stat. 231		Iowa
1824	November 15	Treaty of Harrington's	Treaty with the Quapaw	7 Stat. 232	121	Quapaw
1825	January 20	Treaty of Washington City	Convention with the Choctaw	7 Stat. 234	122	Choctaw
1825	February 12	Treaty of Indian Springs	Convention with the Creeks	7 Stat. 237		Creek
1825	June 2	Treaty of St. Louis	Treaty with the Osage	7 Stat. 240	123	Great and Little Osage
1825	June 3	Treaty of St. Louis	Treaty with the Kansa	7 Stat. 244	124	Kansa
1825	June 9	Treaty of White Paint Creek	Treaty with the Ponca	7 Stat. 247		Ponca
1825	June 22	Treaty of Fort Lookout	Treaty with the Teton, etc., Sioux	7 Stat. 250		Teton (Lakota), Yankton-Yanktonai (Nakota)
1825	June 29	Broken Arrow Agreement	Agreement with the Creeks, Appendix			Creek
1825	July 5	Treaty of Teton River	Treaty with the Sioune and Oglala Tribes	7 Stat. 252		Oglala Sioux
1825	July 6	Treaty of Teton River	Treaty with the Cheyenne Tribe	7 Stat. 255		Cheyenne
1825	July 16	Treaty of Arikara	Treaty with the Hunkpapa Band of the Sioux Tribe	7 Stat. 257		Hunkpapa
1825	July 18	Treaty of Arikara	Treaty with the Arikara Tribe	7 Stat. 259		Arikara
1825	July 30	Treaty of Mandan	Treaty with the Belantse-Etoa or Minitaree Tribe	7 Stat. 261		Hidatsa
1825	July 30	Treaty of Mandan	Treaty with the Mandan Tribe	7 Stat. 264		Mandan
1825	August 4	Treaty of Mandan	Treaty with the Crow Tribe	7 Stat. 266		Crow
1825	August 10	Treaty of Council Grove	Treaty with the Great and Little Osage	7 Stat. 268		Great and Little Osage
1825	August 16	Treaty of Sora Kansas Creek	Treaty with the Kansa	7 Stat. 270		Kansa
1825	August 19	First Treaty of Prairie du Chien	Treaty with the Sioux, etc.	7 Stat. 272		Sioux, Ojibwe, Sac and Fox, Menomini, Ioway, Ho-chunk, and Council of Three Fires (Ojibwe, Odawa, Potawatomi)
1825	September 26	Treaty of Fort Atkinson	Treaty with the Oto and Missouri Tribe	7 Stat. 277		Oto, Missouri
1825	September 30	Treaty of Fort Atkinson	Treaty with the Pawnee Tribe	7 Stat. 279		Pawnee
1825	October 6	Treaty of Fort Atkinson	Treaty with the Omaha Tribe	7 Stat. 282		Omaha
1825	November 7	Treaty of St. Louis	Convention with the Shawnee	7 Stat. 284	125, 126	Shawnee
1826	January 24	Treaty of Washington	Treaty with the Creeks	7 Stat. 286	127, 128, 129, 130, 131	Creek
1826	March 31	Supplement to the Treaty of Washington	Supplementary article to the Treaty with the Creeks of January 24, 1826	7 Stat. 289		Creek
1826	August 5	Treaty of Fond du Lac	Treaty with the Chippewa	7 Stat. 290		Ojibwe
1826	October 16	Treaty of Mississinewas	Treaty with the Potawatomi	7 Stat. 295	132, 133	Potawatomi
1826	October 23	Treaty of Mississinewas	Treaty with the Miami	7 Stat. 300		Miami
1827	August 11	Treaty of Butte des Morts	Treaty with the Chippewa, Menomonie, Winnebago	7 Stat. 303	134	Ojibwe, Menomini, Ho-chunk
1827	September 19	Treaty of St. Joseph	Treaty with the Potawatomi	7 Stat. 305	135, 136, 137, 138, 139, 140	Potawatomi
1827	November 15	Treaty of Creek Agency	Articles of agreement with the Creeks	7 Stat. 307	141	Creek
1828	February 11	Treaty of Wyandot	Treaty with the Eel River, Treaty with the Thorntown Party of the Miami Indians, Treaty with the Miami	7 Stat. 309	142	Eel River
1828	May 6	Treaty of Washington	Treaty with the Western Cherokee; Treaty with the Cherokees West of the Mississippi River; Convention with the Cherokees	7 Stat. 311	143, 144	Cherokee
1828	August 25	Treaty of Green Bay	Treaty with the Winnebago, etc.; Treaty with the Winnebago Tribe and the United Tribes of Pottawatomie, Chippewa and Ottawa; Articles of agreement with the Winnebagoes, Pottawatimies, Chippewas, and Ottawas	7 Stat. 315		Ho-Chunk, Council of Three Fires (Potawatomi, Ojibwe, Odawa)
1828	September 20	Treaty of St. Joseph	Treaty with the Potawatomi	7 Stat. 317; 7 Stat. 603	145, 146	Potawatomi
1829	July 29	Second Treaty of Prairie du Chien	Treaty with the Chippewa, etc., Second Treaty of Prairie du Chien	7 Stat. 320; 7 Stat. 604	147, 148	Council of Three Fires (Ojibwe, Odawa, Potawatomi)
1829	August 1	Third Treaty of Prairie du Chien	Third Treaty of Prairie du Chien, Treaty with the Winnebago	7 Stat. 323	149	Ho-Chunk
1829	August 3	Treaty of Little Sandusky	Treaty with the Delawares; Articles of agreement with the Delawares	7 Stat. 326	150	Lenape
1829	September 24	Treaty of James Fork	Supplementary article to the Treaty of St. Mary's; Supplementary articles of agreement with the Delawares of October 3, 1818	7 Stat. 327	150a	Lenape

=== 1830–1839 ===
Year	Date	Treaty Name	Alternative Treaty Name	Statutes	Land cession reference (Royce Area)	Tribe(s)
1830	July 15	Fourth Treaty of Prairie du Chien	Treaty with the Sauk and Foxes, etc., Fourth Treaty of Prairie du Chien	7 Stat. 328	151	Sac and Fox, the Mdewakanton, Wahpekute, Wahpeton and Sisiton Sioux, Omaha, Ioway, Otoe and Missouria
1830	September 27	Treaty of Dancing Rabbit Creek	Treaty with the Choctaw	7 Stat. 333	156	Choctaw
1830	August 31	Treaty of Franklin	Treaty with the Chickasaw	N/A		Chickasaw
1830	September 1	Supplement to the Treaty of Franklin	Supplemental Treaty with the Chickasaw	N/A		Chickasaw
1831	February 8	Treaty of Washington	Treaty with the Menominee	7 Stat. 342		Menomini
1831	February 17	Supplement to the Treaty of Washington	Treaty with the Menominee	7 Stat. 346		Menomini
1831	February 28	Treaty of Washington	Treaty with the Seneca	7 Stat. 348		Seneca nation
1831	July 20	Treaty of Lewistown	Treaty with the Seneca, etc.	7 Stat. 351		Seneca nation, Shawnee
1831	August 8	Treaty of Wapakoneta	Treaty with the Shawnee	7 Stat. 355		Shawnee
1831	August 30	Treaty of Miami Bay	Treaty with the Ottawa	7 Stat. 359		Ottawa
1832	January 19		Treaty with the Wyandot	7 Stat. 364		Wyandot
1832	March 24	Treaty of Cusseta	Treaty with the Creeks	7 Stat. 366		Creek
1832	May 9	Treaty of Payne's Landing	Treaty with the Seminole	7 Stat. 368		Seminole
1832	September 15		Treaty with the Winnebago	7 Stat. 370		Winnebago
1832	September 21		Treaty with the Sauk and Foxes	7 Stat. 374		Sac and Fox
1832	October 11		Treaty with the Appalachicola Band	7 Stat. 377		
1832	October 20		Treaty with the Potawatomi	7 Stat. 378		Potawatomi
1832	October 20		Treaty with the Chickasaw	7 Stat. 381		Chickasaw
1832	October 22		Treaty with the Chickasaw	7 Stat. 388		Chickasaw
1832	October 24		Treaty with the Kickapoo	7 Stat. 391		Kickapoo
1832	October 26		Treaty with the Potawatomi	7 Stat. 394		Potawatomi
1832	October 26		Treaty with the Shawnee, etc.	7 Stat. 397		
1832	October 27		Treaty with the Potawatomi	7 Stat. 399		Potawatomi
1832	October 27		Treaty with the Kaskaskia, etc.	7 Stat. 403		
1832	October 27		Treaty with the Menominee	7 Stat. 405		Menominee
1832	October 29		Treaty with the Piankashaw and Wea	7 Stat. 410		Piankasaw and Wea
1832	December 29		Treaty with the Seneca and Shawnee	7 Stat. 411		Seneca and Shawnee
1833	February 14		Treaty with the Western Cherokee	7 Stat. 414		Western Cherokee
1833	February 14		Treaty with the Creeks	7 Stat. 417		Creek
1833	February 18		Treaty with the Ottawa	7 Stat. 420		Ottawa
1833	March 28		Treaty with the Seminole	7 Stat. 423		Seminole
1833	May 13		Treaty with the Quapaw	7 Stat. 424		Quapaw
1833	June 18		Treaty with the Appalachicola Band	7 Stat. 427		
1833	September 21		Treaty with the Oto and Missouri	7 Stat. 429		Oto and Missouri
1833	September 26	Treaty of Chicago	Treaty with the Chippewa, etc.	7 Stat. 431		Ottawa, Ojibwe and Potawatomi
1833	October 9		Treaty with the Pawnee	7 Stat. 448		Pawnee
1834	May 24		Treaty with the Chickasaw	7 Stat. 450		Chickasaw
1834	October 23		Treaty with the Miami	7 Stat. 458		Miami
1834	December 4		Treaty with the Potawatomi	7 Stat. 467		Potawatomi
1834	December 10		Treaty with the Potawatomi	7 Stat. 467		Potawatomi
1834	December 16		Treaty with the Potawatomi	7 Stat. 468		Potawatomi
1834	December 17		Treaty with the Potawatomi	7 Stat. 469		Potawatomi
1835	July 1		Treaty with the Caddo	7 Stat. 470		Caddo
1835	August 24		Treaty with the Comanche, etc.	7 Stat. 474		
1835	December 29	Treaty of New Echota	Treaty with the Cherokee	7 Stat. 478		Cherokee
1835	March 14	Treaty of Washington	Agreement with the Cherokee	N/A		Cherokee
1836	March 26		Treaty with the Potawatomi	7 Stat. 490		Potawatomi
1836	March 28	Treaty of Washington	Treaty with the Ottawa, etc.	7 Stat. 491		Ottawa and Ojibwe
1836	March 29		Treaty with the Potawatomi	7 Stat. 498		Potawatomi
1836	April 11		Treaty with the Potawatomi	7 Stat. 499		Potawatomi
1836	April 22		Treaty with the Potawatomi	7 Stat. 500		Potawatomi
1836	April 22		Treaty with the Potawatomi	7 Stat. 501		Potawatomi
1836	April 23		Treaty with the Wyandot	7 Stat. 502		Wyandot
1836	May 9		Treaty with the Chippewa	7 Stat. 503		Chippewa
1836	August 5		Treaty with the Potawatomi	7 Stat. 505		Potawatomi
1836	September 3	Treaty of the Cedars	Treaty with the Menominee	7 Stat. 506		Menominee
1836	September 10		Treaty with the Sioux	7 Stat. 510		Sioux
1836	September 17		Treaty with the Iowa, etc.	7 Stat. 511		
1836	September 20		Treaty with the Potawatomi	7 Stat. 513		Potawatomi
1836	September 22		Treaty with the Potawatomi	7 Stat. 514		Potawatomi
1836	September 23		Treaty with the Potawatomi	7 Stat. 515		Potawatomi
1836	September 27		Treaty with the Sauk and Fox Tribe	7 Stat. 516		Sac and Fox
1836	September 28		Treaty with the Sauk and Foxes	7 Stat. 517		Sac and Fox
1836	September 28		Treaty with the Sauk and Foxes	7 Stat. 520		Sac and Fox
1836	October 15		Treaty with the Oto, etc.	7 Stat. 524		
1836	November 30		Treaty with the Sioux	7 Stat. 527		Sioux
1837	January 14	Treaty of Detroit	Treaty with the Chippewa	7 Stat. 528		Chippewa
1837	January 17	Treaty of Doaksville	Treaty with the Choctaw and Chickasaw	11 Stat. 573		Choctaw and Chickasaw
1837	February 11		Treaty with the Potawatomi	7 Stat. 532		Potawatomi
1837	May 26		Treaty with the Kiowa, etc.	7 Stat. 533		
1837	July 29		Treaty with the Chippewa	7 Stat. 536		Chippewa
1837	September 29		Treaty with the Sioux	7 Stat. 538		Sioux
1837	October 21		Treaty with the Sauk and Foxes	7 Stat. 540		Sac and Fox
1837	October 21		Treaty with the Yankton Sioux	7 Stat. 542		Yankton Sioux
1837	October 21		Treaty with the Sauk and Foxes	7 Stat. 543		Sac and Fox
1837	November 1		Treaty with the Winnebago	7 Stat. 544		Winnebago
1837	November 23		Treaty with the Iowa	7 Stat. 547		Iowa
1837	December 20		Treaty with the Chippewa	7 Stat. 547		Chippewa
1838	January 15	Treaty of Buffalo Creek	Treaty with the New York Indians	7 Stat. 550		Seneca, Mohawk, Cayuga, Oneida, Onondaga, Tuscarora
1838	January 23	Treaty of Saginaw	Treaty with the Chippewa	7 Stat. 565		Chippewa
1838	February 3	Treaty of Washington	Treaty with the Oneida	7 Stat. 566		Oneida
1838	October 19	Treaty of Great Nemowhaw	Treaty with the Iowa	7 Stat. 568		Iowa
1838	November 6	Treaty of Wabash Forks	Treaty with the Miami	7 Stat. 569		Miami
1838	November 23	Treaty of Fort Gibson	Treaty with the Creeks	7 Stat. 574; 11 Stat. 599		Creek
1839	January 11	Treaty of Fort Gibson	Treaty with the Osage	7 Stat. 576		Osage
1839	February 7	Supplement to the Treaty of Detroit	Treaty with the Chippewa	7 Stat. 578		Chippewa
1839	September 3	Treaty of Stockbridge	Treaty with the Stockbridge and Munsee	7 Stat. 580 11 Stat. 577		Stockbridge and Munsee

=== 1840–1849 ===
Year	Date	Treaty Name	Alternative Treaty Name	Statutes	Land cession reference (Royce Area)	Tribe(s)
1840	November 28	Treaty of the Wabash	Treaty with the Miami	7 Stat. 582		Miami
1842	March 17		Treaty with the Wyandot	11 Stat. 557		Wyandot
1842	May 20	Treaty of Buffalo Creek	Treaty with the Seneca	7 Stat. 586		Seneca
1842	October 4	Treaty of La Pointe	Treaty with the Chippewa	7 Stat. 591		Chippewa
1842	October 11		Treaty with the Sauk and Foxes	7 Stat. 596		Sac and Fox
1843			Agreement with the Delawares and Wyandot			Delaware and Wyandot
1845	January 4		Treaty with the Creeks and Seminole	9 Stat. 891		Creek and Seminole
1846	January 14		Treaty with the Kansas Tribe	9 Stat. 842		
1846	May 15		Treaty with the Comanche, Ioni, Aionai, Anadarko, Caddo, etc.	9 Stat. 844		
1846	June 5 & 17		Treaty with the Potawatomi Nation	9 Stat. 853		Potawatomi
1846	August 6		Treaty with the Cherokee	9 Stat. 871		Cherokee
1846	October 13		Treaty with the Winnebago	9 Stat. 878		Winnebago
1846	November 21	Bear Springs Treaty			not ratified	Navajo people
1847	August 2		Treaty with the Chippewa of the Mississippi and Lake Superior	9 Stat. 904		Chippewa
1847	August 21		Treaty with the Pillager Band of Chippewa Indians	9 Stat. 908		
1848	August 6	Treaty of Fort Childs	Treaty with the Pawnee – Grand, Loups, Republicans, etc.	9 Stat. 949		Pawnee
1848	October 18		Treaty with the Menominee	9 Stat. 952		Menominee
1848	November 24		Treaty with the Stockbridge Tribe	9 Stat. 955		Stockbridge Indians (Mahican)
1849	September 9		Treaty with the Navaho	9 Stat. 974		Navaho
1849	December 30	Treaty of Albuquerque	Treaty with the Utah	9 Stat. 984		Ute

=== 1850–1859 ===
Year	Date	Treaty Name	Alternative Treaty Name	Statutes	Land cession reference (Royce Area)	Tribe(s)
1850	April 1		Treaty with the Wyandot	9 Stat. 987		Wyandot
1851	July 23	Treaty of Traverse des Sioux	Treaty with the Sioux-Sisseton and Wahpeton Bands	10 Stat. 949		Sioux
1851	August 5	Treaty of Mendota	Treaty with the Sioux-Mdewakanton and Wahpakoota Bands	10 Stat. 954		Sioux
1851	September 17	Treaty of Fort Laramie	Treaty of Fort Laramie with Sioux, etc.	11 Stat. 749		Sioux, Cheyenne, Arapaho, Crow, Shoshone, Assiniboine, Mandan, Hidatsa and Arikara
1851	September 20	Treaty of Pembina	Treaty with the Pembina and Red Lake Chippewa Half Breed Signatories	not ratified (32nd-1st-Confidential Ex.Doc.10 1–3)		Ojibwe, Métis
1852			Treaty with the Chickasaw			Chickasaw
1852			Treaty with the Apache			Apache
1853	July 27		Treaty with the Comanche, Kiowa, and Apache			Comanche, Kiowa, and Apache
1853			Agreement with the Rogue River	not ratified		Rogue River
1853	September 10		Treaty with the Rogue River, 1853			Rogue River
1853			Treaty with the Umpqua–Cow Creek Band			
1854	March 15		Treaty with the Oto and Missouri	11 Stat. 605		Oto and Missouri
1854	March 16		Treaty with the Omaha			Omaha
1854	May 6		Treaty with the Delawares			Delaware
1854	May 6		Treaty with the Creeks			Creek
1854	May 10		Treaty with the Shawnee			Shawnee
1854	May 12		Treaty with the Menominee			Menominee
1854	May 17		Treaty with the Iowa			Iowa
1854	May 18		Treaty with the Sauk and Foxes of Missouri			Sac and Fox
1854	May 18		Treaty with the Kickapoo			Kickapoo
1854	May 30		Treaty with the Kaskaskia, Peoria, etc.			
1854	June 5		Treaty with the Miami			Miami
1854	June 13		Supplementary Treaty with the Creek	11 Stat. 599		Creek
1854	September 30	Treaty of La Pointe	Treaty with the Chippewa	10 Stat. 1109	332	Chippewa
1854			Treaty with the Choctaw and Chickasaw			Choctaw and Chickasaw
1854			Treaty with the Rogue River, 1854			Rogue River
1854	November 18		Treaty with the Chasta, Scoton, Umpqua			
1854	November 29	Treaty of Calapooia Creek	Treaty with the Umpqua and Kalapuya			Umpqua and Kalapuya
1854	December 9		Treaty with the Confederated Oto and Missouri			Oto and Missouri
1854	December 26	Treaty of Medicine Creek	Treaty with the Nisqualli, Puyallup, etc.			Nisqually, Puyallup and Squaxin Island
1855		Willamette Valley Treaty of 1855; Treaty of Dayton	Treaty with the Kalapuya, etc.			
1855	January 22	Treaty of Point Elliott	Treaty with the Dwamish, Suquamish, etc., Point Elliott Treaty	12 Stat. 927		Duwamish, Suquamish, Snoqualmie, Snohomish, Lummi, Upper Skagit, Lower Skagit, Swinomish
1855	January 26		Treaty with the S'klallam	12 Stat. 933		S'klallam
1855	January 31	Treaty of Washington	Treaty with the Wyandot			Wyandot
1855	January 31	Treaty of Neah Bay	Treaty with the Makah	12 Stat. 939		Makah
1855	February 22	Treaty of Washington	Treaty with the Chippewa			Ojibwe (Mississippi and Pillager)
1855	February 27	Treaty of Washington	Treaty with the Winnebago			Ho-chunk
1855	June 9	Treaties of Walla Walla	Treaty with the Wallawalla, Cayuse, etc.	12 Stat. 945		Cayuse, Nez Perce, Umatilla, Walla Walla and Yakama
1855	June 9		Treaty with the Yakima	12 Stat. 951		Yakima
1855	June 11		Treaty with the Nez Perces	12 Stat. 957		
1855	June 22	Treaty of Washington	Treaty with the Choctaw and Chickasaw	11 Stat. 611		Choctaw and Chickasaw
1855	June 25		Treaty with the Tribes of Middle Oregon	12 Stat. 963		
1855	July 1		Treaty with the Quinaielt, etc.	12 Stat. 971		
1855	July 16	Treaty of Hellgate	Treaty with the Flatheads, etc.	12 Stat. 975		Bitterroot Salish, Kootenai and Pend d'Oreilles
1855	July 18		Merriwether's Agreement with Navajo	1 Stat. 621		Navajo
1855	July 31		Treaty with the Ottawa and Chippewa	1 Stat. 621		Chippewa, Ottawa
1855	August 2		Treaty with the Chippewa of Sault Ste. Marie	11 Stat. 631		Chippewa
1855	August 2		Treaty with the Chippewa of Saginaw, Swan Creek and Black River	11 Stat. 633		Chippewa
1855	October 17		Treaty with the Blackfeet and other tribes	11 Stat. 6571		
1855	December 21		Treaty with the Molala	12 Stat. 981		Molala
1856	February 5		Treaty with the Stockbridge and Munsee	11 Stat. 668		Stockbridge and Munsee
1856	February 11		Treaty with the Menominee	11 Stat. 679		Menominee
1856	August 7		Treaty with the Creeks and Seminole	11 Stat. 699	Creeks ceded lands to Seminoles, Seminole removal	Creek and Seminole
1857	September 24		Treaty with Pawnee, Four Confederated Bands	11 Stat. 729		
1857	November 5		Treaty with the Seneca, Tonawanda Band	11 Stat. 73512 Stat. 991		
1858	March 12		Treaty with the Ponca	12 Stat. 997		Ponca
1858	June 19		Treaty with the Dakota or Sioux, Medawakanton and Wahpakoota Bands	12 Stat. 1023		
1858	June 19		Treaty with the Dakota or Sioux, Sisseton and Wahpaton Bands	12 Stat. 1031		
1858	June 19		Treaty with the Sioux, Medawakanton and Sisseeton Bands	12 Stat. 1042		Sioux, Medawakanton, and Sisseeton
1858	December 25		Bonneville's Agreement with Navajo		518, 519	Navajo
1859	April 15		Treaty with the Winnebago	12 Stat. 1101		Winnebago
1859	July 16		Treaty with the Chippewa, Swan Creek and Black Bands, and Monsee Christian Indians	12 Stat. 1105		Chippewa, Swan Creek and Black Bands, and Christian Indians
1859			Treaty with the Sauk and Foxes			Sac and Fox
1859	October 5		Treaty with the Kansas Tribe	12 Stat. 1111		

=== 1860–1869 ===
Year	Date	Treaty Name	Alternative Treaty Name	Statutes	Land cession reference (Royce Area)	Tribe(s)
1860	May 30		Treaty with the Delawares	12 Stat. 1129		
1861	February 18		Treaty with the Arapaho and Cheyenne	12 Stat. 1163		
1861	March 6		Treaty with the Sauk and Foxes and Iowas.	12 Stat. 1171		
1861	July 2		Treaty with the Delawares	12 Stat. 1177		
1861	November 15		Treaty with the Potawatomi	12 Stat. 1191		
1862	March 13		Treaty with the Kansas Indians	12 Stat. 1221		
1862	June 24		Treaty with the Ottawa of Blanchard's Fork and Roche de Boeuf	12 Stat. 1237		
1862	June 28		Treaty with the Kickapoo	13 Stat. 623		
1863	March 11		Treaty with the Chippewa of the Mississippi and the Pillager and Lake Winnibigoshish Bands	12 Stat. 1249		
1863	June 9		Treaty with the Nez Perce	14 Stat. 647		Nez Perce
1863			Treaty with the Eastern Shoshoni	18 Stat. 685		
1863	July 30		Treaty with the Shoshoni-Northwestern Bands	13 Stat. 663		
1863	October 1		Treaty with the Western Shoshoni	18 Stat. 689 444		
1863	October 2		Supplement to Treaty with the Chippewa-Red Lake and Pembina Bands	13 Stat. 667		
1863	October 7		Treaty with the Utah-Tabeguache Band	13 Stat. 673		
1863			Treaty with the Shoshoni-Goship	13 Stat. 681		
1864	April 12		Supplement to Treaty with the Chippewa—Red Lake and Pembina Bands	13 Stat. 689		
1864	May 7		Treaty with the Chippewa, Mississippi, and Pillager and Lake Winnibigoshish Bands	13 Stat. 693		
1864	October 14		Treaty with the Klamath, etc.	16 Stat. 707		
1864	October 18		Treaty with the Chippewa of Saginaw, Swan Creek, and Black River	14 Stat. 657		
1865	March 6		Treaty with the Omaha	14 Stat. 667		
1865	March 8		Treaty with the Winnebago	14 Stat. 671		
1865	March 10		Supplement to Treaty with the Ponca	14 Stat. 675		
1865	August 12		Treaty with the Snake, Wal Pah Pe Tribe	14 Stat. 683		
1865	September 29		Treaty with the Osage	14 Stat. 687		
1865	October 10	Treaty of Fort Sully	Treaty with the Sioux or Dakota, Miniconjou Band	14 Stat. 695		
1865	October 14	Treaty of Fort Sully	Treaty with the Sioux or Dakota, Lower Brule Band	14 Stat. 699		
1865			Agreement with the Cherokee and Other Tribes in the Indian Territory			
1865	October 14		Treaty with the Cheyenne and Arapaho	14 Stat. 703		
1865	October 17		Treaty with the Apache, Cheyenne, and Arapaho	14 Stat. 713		
1865	October 18		Treaty with the Comanche and Kiowa	14 Stat. 717		
1865	October 19	Treaty of Fort Sully	Treaty with the Dakota or Sioux, Two-Kettle Band	14 Stat. 723		
1865	October 19	Treaty of Fort Sully	Treaty with the Blackfeet Sioux	14 Stat. 727		
1865	October 20	Treaty of Fort Sully	Treaty with the Dakota or Sioux, Sans Arc Band	14 Stat. 731		
1865	October 20	Treaty of Fort Sully	Treaty with the Dakota or Sioux, Yankpapa Band	14 Stat. 735		
1865	October 20	Treaty of Fort Sully	Treaty with the Dakota or Sioux, Onkpahpah Band	14 Stat. 739		
1865	October 28	Treaty of Fort Sully	Treaty with the Dakota or Sioux, Upper Yanktonai Band	14 Stat. 743		
1865	October 28	Treaty of Fort Fort Sully	Treaty with the Dakota or Sioux, Oglala Band	14 Stat. 747		
1865	November 15		Supplement to Treaty with the Confederated Tribes and Bands of Middle Oregon	14 Stat. 751		
1866	March 21		Treaty with the Seminole	14 Stat. 755		
1866	March 29		Treaty with the Potawatomi	14 Stat. 763		
1866	April 7		Treaty with the Chippewa, Bois Fort Band	14 Stat. 765		
1866	April 28		Treaty with the Choctaw and Chickasaw	14 Stat. 769		
1866	June 14		Treaty with the Creek Nation	14 Stat. 785		
1866	July 4		Treaty with the Delawares	14 Stat. 793		
1866			Agreement at Fort Berthold, Appendix			
1866	July 19		Treaty with the Cherokee	14 Stat. 799		
1866	July 19		Supplement to Treaty with the Cherokee	16 Stat. 727		
1867	February 18		Treaty with the Sauk and Foxes	15 Stat. 495		
1867	February 19		Treaty with the Sioux—Sisseton and Wahpeton Bands	15 Stat. 505		
1867	February 19		Treaty with the Seneca, Mixed Seneca and Shawnee, Quapaw, etc.	15 Stat. 513		
1867	February 27		Treaty with the Potawatomi	15 Stat. 531		
1867	March 19		Treaty with the Chippewa of the Mississippi	16 Stat. 719		
1867	October 21	Medicine Lodge Treaty	Treaty with the Kiowa and Comanche	15 Stat. 581		
1867	July 25		Treaty with the Kiowa, Comanche, and Apache	15 Stat. 589		
1867	October 28		Treaty with the Cheyenne and Arapaho	15 Stat. 593		
1868	March 2		Treaty with the Ute	15 Stat. 619		
1868	April 27		Treaty with the Cherokee	16 Stat. 727		
1868	April 29	Treaty of Fort Laramie	Treaty with the Sioux—Brule, Oglala, Miniconjou, Yanktonai, Hunkpapa, Blackfeet, Cuthead, Two Kettle, Sans Arcs, and Santee—and Arapaho	15 Stat. 635		
1868	May 7		Treaty with the Crows	15 Stat. 649		
1868	May 10		Treaty with the Northern Cheyenne and Northern Arapaho	15 Stat. 655		
1868	June 1	Treaty of Fort Sumner	Treaty with the Navajo Indians; Navajo Treaty of 1868; Bosque Redondo Treaty; Treaty of Hwéeldi	15 Stat. 667	518, 519	Navajo
1868	July 3		Treaty with the Eastern Band Shoshoni and Bannock	15 Stat. 673	524,539,540	
1868	August 13	Treaty of Lapwai	Treaty with the Nez Perce	15 Stat. 693		Nez Perce

=== 1870–1879 ===
Treaty-making between various Native American governments and the United States officially concluded on March 3, 1871 with the passing of the United States Code Title 25, Chapter 3, Subchapter 1, Section 71 (25 U.S.C. § 71). Pre-existing treaties were grandfathered, and further agreements were made under domestic law.

Year	Date	Type	Alternative Treaty Name	Statutes	Land cession reference (Royce Area)	Tribe(s)
1870	January 31	Executive Order		N/A	527, 528	San Pasqual and Pala Valley Mission Indians
1870	March 30	Executive Order		N/A		Round Valley Indian Reservation
1870	April 12	Executive Order		N/A	620, 621	Arikara, Gros Ventre, and Mandan
1870	April 12	Executive Order		N/A	529	Arikara, Gros Ventre, and Mandan
1870	July 15	Act of Congress		16 Stat. 359	650	Kickapoo of Texas and Mexico
1870	July 15	Act of Congress		16 Stat. 362	534	Great and Little Osage
1870	July 15	Act of Congress		16 Stat. 362	530	Great and Little Osage
1871	February 6	Act of Congress		16 Stat. 404	403	Stockbridge and Munsee
1871	March 3	Act of Congress	United States Code Title 25, Chapter 3, Subchapter 1, Section 71	16 Stat. 566		
1871	March 3	Act of Congress		16 Stat. 569	650	Kickapoo of Texas and Mexico
1871	March 14	Executive Order		N/A	537	Paiute, Snake, Shoshoni
1871	March 27	Executive Order		N/A	534	Osage
1871	November 9	Executive Order		N/A	531	Southern Apache
1871	November 9	Executive Order		N/A	573, 603	Apache
1871	November 9	Executive Order		N/A	541	Apache
1871	November 9	Executive Order		N/A	582	Apache
1871	December	Memorandum		N/A		Methow, Okanagan, Kootenay, Pend d'Oreille, Colville, North Spokane, San Poeil et al.
1872	April 9	Executive Order		N/A	533	Methow, Okanagan, et al.
1872	April 23	Act of Congress		17 Stat. 55	566	Ute
1872	May 8	Act of Congress		17 Stat. 85		Kaw
1872	May 23	Act of Congress		17 Stat. 159	506	Potawatomi and Absentee Shawnee
1872	May 29	Act of Congress		17 Stat. 190		Lake Superior Chippewa
1872	May 29	Act of Congress		17 Stat. 190		Cheyenne and Arapaho
1872	June 1	Act of Congress		17 Stat. 213	256	Miami (Meshin-go-mesia's band)
1872	June 5	Act of Congress		17 Stat. 228	534	Great and Little Osage
1872	June 5	Act of Congress		17 Stat. 228	535	Kaw
1872	June 5	Act of Congress		17 Stat. 266		Flathead
1872	June 7	Act of Congress		17 Stat. 281		Sisseton and Wahpeton Sioux
1872	June 10	Act of Congress		17 Stat. 381		Ottawa and Chippewa
1872	June 10	Act of Congress		17 Stat. 388		Ottawa of Blanchards Fork and Roche de Boeuf
1872	June 10	Act of Congress		17 Stat. 391		Omaha, Pawnee, Oto, Missouri, and Sac and Fox of the Missouri
1872	July 2	Executive Order		N/A	533, 536	Methow, Okanaga, et al.
1872	September 12	Executive Order		N/A	537, 638, 646	Paiute, Snake, and Shoshoni
1872	September 20	Agreement	Agreement with the Sisseton and Wahpeton Bands of Sioux Indians	Rev. Stat 1050	538	Sisseton and Wahpeton Bands of Sioux
1872	September 26	Agreement		18 Stat. 291	539, 540	Shoshoni
1872	October 19	Agreement		N/A	540A	Wichita and affiliated bands
1872	October 26	Executive Order		N/A		Makah
1872	December 14	Executive Order		N/A	541, 600	Apache
1872	December 14	Executive Order		N/A		Apache
1873	January 2	Executive Order		N/A		Makah
1873	January 9	Executive Order		N/A	607	Tule River, King's River, Owen's River, et al.
1873	February 14	Act of Congress		17 Stat. 456	538	Sisseton and Wahpeton Sioux
1873	February 19	Act of Congress		17 Stat. 466	249	New York Indians
1873	March 1	Executive Order		N/A	337	Lac Courte Oreille Band of Chippewa
1873	March 3	Act of Congress		17 Stat. 539	542	Pembina Chippewa
1873	March 3	Act of Congress	Abolish tribal relations	17 Stat. 631	330	Miami
1873	March 3	Act of Congress		17 Stat. 633	543	Creek and Seminole
1873	March 3	Act of Congress		17 Stat. 626	544, 583	Round Valley Indian Reservation
1873	March 3	Act of Congress		17 Stat. 626		Crow
1873	April 8	Executive Order		N/A	576	Paiute, et al.
1873	April 8	Executive Order		N/A	583	Round Valley Indian Reservation
1873	May 2	Agreement	Amended Agreement with Certain Sioux Indians	17 Stat. 456; 18 Stat. 167		Sisseton and Wahpeton Bands of Sioux
1873	May 29	Executive Order		N/A	643, 644	Mescalero Apache
1873	June 16	Executive Order		N/A	545	Nez Perce
1873	July 5	Executive Order		N/A	565, 574	Blackfoot, Gros Ventre, et al.
1873	August 5	Executive Order		N/A	546	Apache
1873	August 16	Agreement		N/A	557	Crow
1873	September 6	Executive Order		N/A	405	Niskwali, et al.
1873	September 9	Executive Order		N/A	349	Dwamish, et al.
1873	September 13	Agreement	Brunot Treaty	N/A	566	Colorado Ute
1873	October 3	Executive Order		N/A	547, 607	Tule river, King's river, Owen's river, et al.
1873	October 21	Executive Order		N/A	548	Makah
1873	November 4	Executive Order		N/A	549	Mississippi Chippewa
1873	November 4	Executive Order		N/A	550	Mississippi Chippewa
1873	November 4	Executive Order		N/A	372, 551	Quinaielt, Quillehute, et al.
1873	November 8	Executive Order		N/A	552, 553	Coeur d'Alene, et al.
1873	November 22	Executive Order		N/A	554	Colorado River Indian Reservation
1873	November 22	Executive Order		N/A	555	Dwamish, et al.
1873	December 10	Executive Order		N/A	563	Jicarilla Apache
1873	December 23	Executive Order		N/A	351	Dwamish, et al.
1873	December 31	Executive Order		N/A		Santee Sioux
1874	January 31	Executive Order		N/A	557	Crow
1874	February 2	Executive Order		N/A	643	Mescalero Apache
1874	February 12	Executive Order		N/A	558, 576	Paiute, et al.
1874	February 14	Executive Order		N/A		Odawa and Ojibwe in Michigan
1874	February 25	Executive Order		N/A	559	Skokomish (S'klallam)
1874	March 19	Executive Order		N/A	560	Paiute
1874	March 23	Executive Order		N/A	561, 562	Paiute
1874	March 25	Executive Order		N/A	563	Apache (Jicarilla bands)
1874	April 9	Executive Order		N/A	564	Muckleshoot Indian Reservation
1874	April 9	Executive Order		N/A	588	Apache
1874	April 15	Act of Congress	Established reservation	18 Stat. 28	565	Gros Ventre, Piegan, Blood, Blackfoot, River Crow
1874	April 29	Act of Congress	Agreement of 18 Sept 1873 confirmed	18 Stat. 36	566	Ute
1874	May 26	Executive Order		N/A	567, 568	Pillager Chippewa
1874	June 22	Act of Congress	Payment for land by 12 Sept 1854 Treaty	18 Stat. 140	569	L'Anse and Lac Vieux Desert Ojibwe
1874	June 22	Act of Congress	Agreement of 26 Sept 1872 confirmed	18 Stat. 166	539	Shoshoni
1874	June 22	Act of Congress	2nd payment re Acts of 1872 & 1873	18 Stat. 167	538	Sisseton and Wahpeton Sioux
1874	June 22	Act of Congress	Purchase of Land	18 Stat. 170	570	From Omaha for Winnegagoes
1874	June 22	Act of Congress	Fund removal, as per Treaty 18 May 1854	18 Stat. 156		Kickapoo of Texas and Mexico
1874	June 23	Agreement		N/A	571	Eastern Shawnee
1874	June 23	Act of Congress	Sale of lands per 1872 Act	18 Stat. 272		Kaw, "Kansas Indian" lands
1874	June 23	Act of Congress	NA	18 Stat. 273 not in cite	572	Papago
1874	June 23	Act of Congress	NA	18 Stat. 273 not in cite		New York Indians
1874	July 21	Executive Order		N/A	573	Apache
1874	August 19	Executive Order		N/A	574	Gros Ventre, Piegan, Blood, Blackfoot, River Crow
1874	November 16	Executive Order		N/A	466, 554, 593	
1874	November 24	Executive Order		N/A	531	Southern Apache
1874	December 15	Act of Congress	Treaty 3 July 1868 amended, land ceded	18 Stat. 291	539	Shoshoni
1875	January 11	Executive Order		N/A	614	Sioux
1875	February 12	Executive Order		N/A	575	Shoshone, Bannock, Sheepeater
1875	March 3	Act of Congress	Reduced reservation	18 Stat. 445	576, 577	Paiute
1875	March 3	Act of Congress	Removed to new reservation	18 Stat. 446	578, 579	Alsea Indian Reservation, Siletz Indian Reservation
1875	March 3	Act of Congress	Purchase land for	18 Stat. 447	580	Eastern Band of Cherokee Indians
1875	March 3	Act of Congress	Agreement 23 June 1874 confirmed, Eastern Shawnee lands to Modoc	18 Stat. 447	571	Eastern Shawnee, Modoc
1875	March 16	Executive Order		N/A	581	Sioux
1875	March 25	Executive Order		N/A	557	Crow (Judith Basin Indian Reservation)
1875	April 13	Executive Order		N/A	622, 623	Gros Ventre, Piegan, Blood, Blackfoot, River Crow
1875	April 23	Executive Order		N/A	582	Apache
1875	May 15	Executive Order		N/A	589, 646	Paiute and Shoshoni
1875	May 18	Executive Order		N/A	583	Round Valley Indian Reservation
1875	May 20	Executive Order		N/A	614	Sioux
1875	June 10	Executive Order		N/A	545	Nez Perce
1875	June 23	Executive Order		N/A	584	Sioux
1875	July 3	Executive Order		N/A	577	Paiute
1875	October 20	Executive Order		N/A		Mescalero Apache
1875	October 20	Executive Order		N/A	585	Crow
1875	November 22	Executive Order		N/A	586	Ute
1875	December 21	Executive Order		N/A	587, 588	Southern Apache
1875	December 27	Executive Order		N/A		Mission Indians (Portrero [Rincon, Gapich, LaJolla], Cahuila, Capitan Grande, Santa Ysabel [Mesa Grande], Pala, Agua Caliente, Sycuan, Inaja, Cosmit)

=== 1880–present ===
Year	Date	Treaty Name	Alternative Treaty Name	Statutes	Land cession reference (Royce Area)	Tribe(s)
1880	January 6	Executive Order		N/A	615	Navajo
1880	January 17	Executive Order		N/A		Mission Indians (Agua Caliente Indian Reservation, Santa Ysabel Indian Reservation)
1880	March 6	Agreement		21 Stat. 199	616, 617	Ute
1880	March 6	Executive Order		N/A	618	Nez Perce (Moses' Band)
1880	March 16	Act of Congress		21 Stat. 68		Kaw
1880	May 14	Agreement		N/A		Crow
1880	May 14	Agreement		N/A		Shoshoni, Bannock, and Sheep-eater
1880	June 8	Executive Order		N/A		Havasupai
1880	June 12	Agreement	Agreement with the Crows	N/A	619	Crow
1880	June 15	Act of Congress		N/A		Ute
1880	July 13	Executive Order		N/A	620, 621	Arikara, Gros Ventre, and Mandan
1880	July 13	Executive Order		N/A	622, 623	Gros Ventre, Piegan, Blood, Blackfoot, and River Crow
1880	July 13	Executive Order		N/A	613	Sioux (Drifting Goose's Band)
1880	July 23	Executive Order		N/A		Malheur Indian Reservation
1880	September 11	Agreement		N/A	616, 617	Ute
1880	September 21	Executive Order		N/A	624	Jicarilla Apache
1880	November 23	Executive Order		N/A		Havasupai
1882–83			Agreement with the Sioux of Various Tribes			
1883			Agreement with the Columbia and Colville			
1891	January 12	Act of Congress		26 Stat. 712		Mission Indians
1891	February 13	Act of Congress		26 Stat. 749		Sac and Fox
1891	March 3	Act of Congress		26 Stat. 1016	506	Citizen Band of Potawatomi
1891	March 3	Act of Congress		26 Stat. 1022	525	Cheyenne and Arapaho
1891	March 3	Act of Congress		26 Stat. 1027	553	Coeur d'Alene
1891	March 3	Act of Congress		26 Stat. 1032	712, 713	Gros Ventre and Mandan
1891	March 3	Act of Congress		26 Stat. 1035	496	Sisseton and Wahpeton Sioux
1891	March 13	Act of Congress		26 Stat. 1016	506	Absentee Shawnee
1891	October 16	Executive Order		N/A	400, 461	Hupa et al.
1891	December 19	Cherokee Outlet Agreement				Cherokee Nation
1892	June 17	Executive Order		N/A	716	Fort Berthold Indian Reservation
1892	June 17	Act of Congress		27 Stat. 52	400	Klamath River Indian Reservation
1892	July 1	Act of Congress		27 Stat. 62	717, 718	Colville Indian Reservation
1892	July 13	Act of Congress		27 Stat. 124	552	Coeur d'Alene
1892	July 13	Act of Congress		27 Stat. 139	625	Spokane
1892	October 22	McCumber Agreement	Agreement Between the Turtle Mountain Indians and the Commission	52nd-2nd-Ex.Doc.229		Turtle Mountain Band of Chippewa
1892	November 21	Executive Order		N/A	655	Navajo
1892	November 21	Executive Order		N/A	719	Red Lake Band of Chippewa
1892	November 28	Executive Order		N/A		Yakima
1893	February 20	Act of Congress		27 Stat. 469	720	White Mountain Apache
1893	March 3	Act of Congress		27 Stat. 557	650	Kickapoo
1893	March 3	Act of Congress		27 Stat. 640	289	Cherokee
1893	March 3	Act of Congress		27 Stat. 643	606	Tonkawa
1893	March 3	Act of Congress		27 Stat. 644	591	Pawnee
1893	April 12	Executive Order		N/A		Osette Indians
1893	September 11	Executive Order		N/A		Hoh River Indians
1894	June 6	Act of Congress		28 Stat. 86	370	Warm Springs
1894	August 15	Act of Congress		28 Stat. 314	411	Yankton Sioux
1894	August 15	Act of Congress		28 Stat. 320	400	Yakima
1894	August 15	Act of Congress		28 Stat. 332	552	Coeur d'Alene
1894	August 15	Act of Congress		28 Stat. 320		Yakima
1894	August 15	Act of Congress		28 Stat. 323	479	Alsea et al.
1894	August 15	Act of Congress		28 Stat. 326	442	Nez Perce
1894	August 15	Act of Congress		28 Stat. 332	652	Yuma
1902	March 10	McLaughlin Agreement	Agreement Between the Red Lake Indians and the Commission	33 Stat. 46		
1904	April 21	Act of Congress	Turtle Mountain Chippewa Treaty; 10-cent Treaty; Agreement with the Turtle Mountain Band, amended and ratified	33 Stat. 194		Turtle Mountain Band of Chippewa Indians
1907	November 16	Presidential proclamation	Annexation of the Indian Territory; Oklahoma Statehood signed by President Theodore Roosevelt	35 Stat. 2160		Cherokee Nation, Choctaw Nation, Chickasaw Nation, Creek Nation, Seminole Nation, Quapaw Agency

== See also ==
- List of treaties
- List of treaties of the Confederate States of America
- List of treaties unsigned or unratified by the United States
- Free trade agreements of the United States
- International organization membership of the United States
