= Treaty of Castor Hill =

1832 treaty between the United States and Native Americans

The Treaty of Castor Hill was a treaty made in 1832 at Castor Hill, Missouri, between the United States and the Kickapoo, Delaware (Lenape), Shawnee, Kaskaskia, Peoria people, Piankeshaw, and Wea.

== Background ==
This treaty renounced rights to the lands assigned to the Kickapoo in Missouri in their 1822 treaty with the US in exchange for 768,000 acres of land in Kansas and payments of cash and goods from the US Government over a period of one to ten years. Pressure from encroaching white settlers united the Native nations, as recognized in Ratified Indian Treaty 273, while they suffered a reduction of their reservation lands to just 20% of what was provided in the original agreement within 22 years.

== See also ==
- List of Indian treaties
