= Treaty of Fort Wayne =

Treaty of Fort Wayne may refer to either of two treaties between the United States and Native American tribes signed at Fort Wayne in Indiana.

- Treaty of Fort Wayne (1803), with the Delaware, Shawnee, Potowatomi, Miami, Eel River Miami, Kickapoo, Wea, Piankashaws, and Kaskaskias
- Treaty of Fort Wayne (1809), with the Delaware, Potowatomi, Miami, and Eel River Miami
