= Treaty of Washington =

The Treaty of Washington may refer to:

- Treaty of Washington (1805), between the U.S. and the Creek National Council (Muscogee (Creek))
- The Adams–Onís Treaty of 1819, under which terms the U.S. acquired Florida from Spain and renounced claims to Spanish Texas
- Treaty of Washington (1824), two Indian nation treaties, between the U.S. and the Sac (Sauk) and Meskwaki (Fox) (7 Stat. 229), and the Iowa (7 Stat. 231)
- Treaty of Washington (1826), between the U.S. and the Creek National Council led by Opothleyahola
- Treaty of Washington (1828), between the U.S. and the Cherokee, Arkansas Territory
- Treaty of Washington, with Menominee (1831), between the U.S. and the Menominee Indian tribe
- Treaty of Washington (1836), a U.S.–Native American (Ottawa and Chippewa) treaty
- The Webster–Ashburton Treaty of 1842, which settled several border disputes between Canada and the United States
- The Oregon Treaty of 1846, which established the US–British frontier west of the Rocky Mountains (today's US–Canada boundary)
- Treaty of Washington (1855), between the U.S. and Ojibwa
- The Treaty of Washington (1871), a general agreement between the United States and the British Empire
- The International Meridian Conference of 1884 in Washington DC, establishing the Greenwich Meridian, the world time zone system and the universal day as international standards
- The Treaty of Washington (1900) between Spain and the United States
- The Washington Naval Treaty of 1922 that limited naval armaments
- The North Atlantic Treaty of 1949 that created NATO
- The Treaty of Washington (1989), Treaty on Intellectual Property in respect of integrated circuits
- The Convention on International Trade in Endangered Species of Wild Fauna and Flora, better known as CITES
