= Eel River people =

Historical Native American tribe from Indiana

Eel River Indians
Total population
- no longer a distinct tribe, merged into the rest of the Miami people

Regions with significant populations
- United States (Indiana)

Languages
- Miami–Illinois language

Religion
- Indigenous religion

Related ethnic groups
- Wea, Piankashaw, and other Miami people

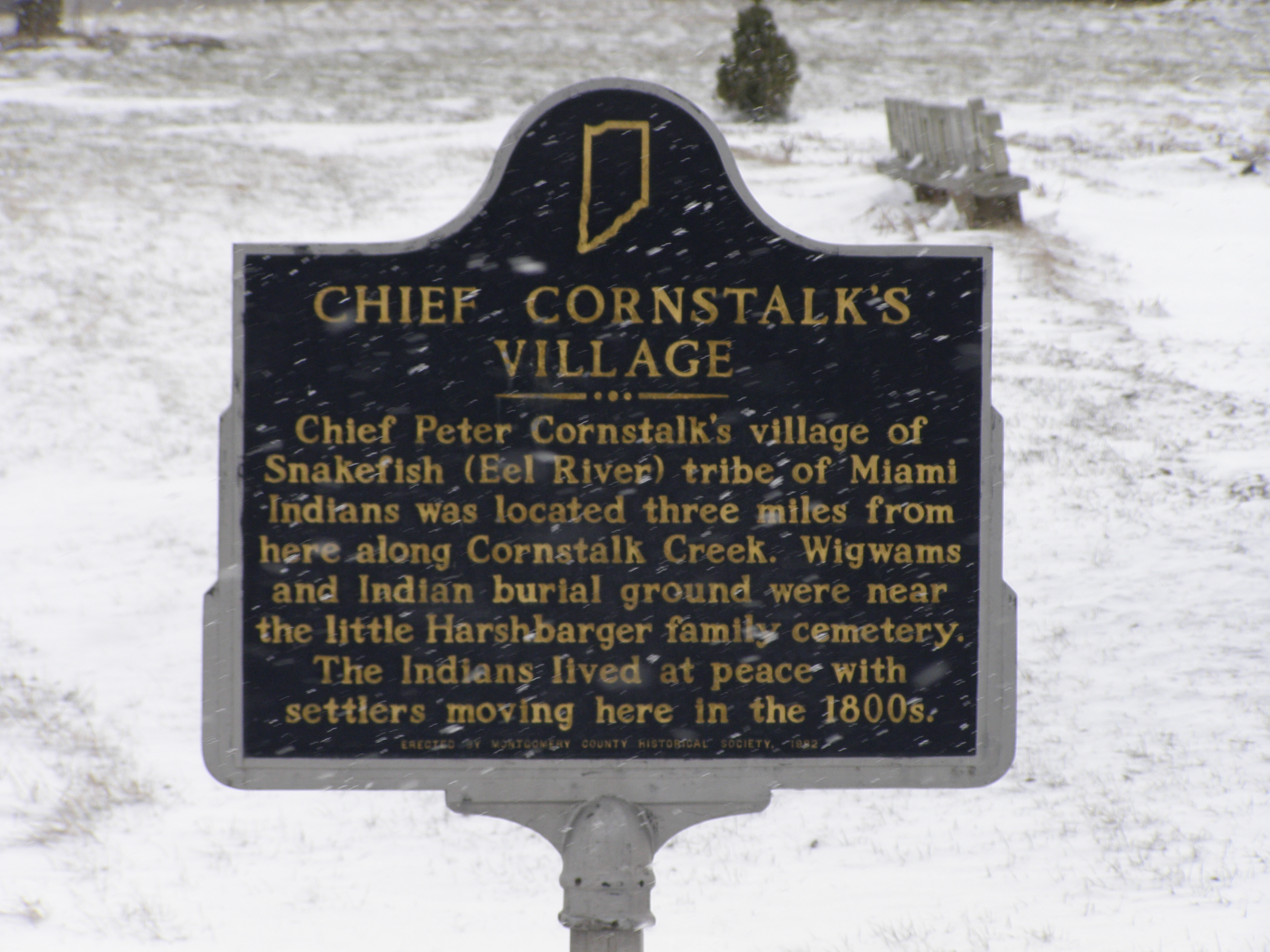
Chief Cornstalk's Village Historic Marker in Parkersburg, Indiana.

The Eel River (Miami-Illinois: Kineepikomeekwaki) were a historic Native American tribe from Indiana. They were a sub-tribe of the Miami people and spoke an Algonquian language.

At the time of European contact in the mid-18th century, the tribe lived the northern Eel River, a tributary of the Wabash River in what is now Cass County, Indiana.

== History ==
=== 18th century ===
In 1765, the Eel River tribe lived in a village north of where the Eel entered the Wabash River. The Kentucky militia attacked and destroyed their village, so survivors founded a new village near Sugar Creek in what is now Boone County, Indiana. The village was named Kawiakiungi or "Place of Thorns" (Miami-Illinois: Akaawiahkionki) A historical marker commemorates their cemetery, near Thorntown, Indiana.

After fighting the Americans in the 1794 Battle of Fallen Timbers, they signed the 1795 Treaty of Greenville. Through this and subsequent treaties, they ceded their land in Boone County for land in what is now Miami County, Indiana.

=== 19th century ===
In the 1814 treaty, the Eel River Indians, along with the Wea, were named part of the "Miami Nation of Indians"; however, the U.S. acknowledged them as a distinct tribe in 1847 and they were allowed to remain in Indiana when the Miami were forcibly removed to Kansas and later Indian Territory.

By 1851, of the only 19 Eel River Indians, 16 stayed in Indiana, while three moved with the Miami to Kansas and later Indian Territory in 1873. In 1889, they enrolled as part of the Miami.

== Descendants ==
Descendants of the Eel River Indians who migrated to Kansas and Indian Territory are enrolled citizens of the Miami Tribe of Oklahoma today.

== Cultural heritage group ==
Michael Glen Floyd formed the Eel River Tribe of Indiana, an unrecognized organization. The group is not federally recognized, state recognized, or a nonprofit organization. In 2006, Floyd submitted a letter of intent to petition the federal recognition for recognition but did not submit a completed petition. In 2021, Floyd filed the lawsuit Michael Glen Floyd v. State of Indiana, et al., which also listed State of New Mexico, Miami Nation of Indiana, Eiteljorg Museum, Jack Floyd Jr., and others as defendants, in the U.S. District Court, District on Columbia; however, his case was dismissed.
