= Treaty of Fort Wayne (1803) =

1803 treaty between the United States and Native Americans

- Type: Recognition of American ownership of the Vincennes Tract
- Signed: June 7, 1803
- Location: Fort Wayne, Indiana Territory
- Effective: December 26, 1803
- Condition: Transfer of money and goods to natives; US to relinquish land claims in adjacent territory
- Signatories: William Henry Harrison; Little Turtle; Topinabee; Winnemac
- Parties: United States of America; Delawares; Shawnee; Potowatomi; Miami; Kickapoo; Eel River band; Weas; Piankeshaws; Kaskaskias
- Language: English

The Treaty of Fort Wayne was a treaty between the United States and several groups of Native Americans. The treaty was signed on June 7, 1803, and proclaimed December 26, 1803. It more precisely defined the boundaries of the Vincennes tract ceded to the United States by the Treaty of Greenville, 1795.

== Parties ==
William Henry Harrison, who at the time was governor of Indiana Territory and superintendent of Indian affairs and commissioner plenipotentiary of the United States for concluding any treaty or treaties which may be found necessary with any of the Indian tribes north west of the Ohio river, negotiated the treaty for the United States. The native peoples were represented by chiefs and head warriors of the Delawares, Shawnee, Potowatomi, Miami and Kickapoo. The Eel River band of Miami, the Weas, Piankeshaws, and Kaskaskias were represented by proxy agents.

== Terms ==
The first article more precisely defined the boundaries of the Vincennes Tract surrounding Fort Vincennes on the Wabash River, which had been confirmed as a possession of the United States in the 1795 Treaty of Greenville. The land was originally purchased from the tribes by the Kingdom of France. It was transferred to Great Britain in 1763, and to the United States in 1783. The area was a rectangular tract of approximately 160,000 acres (650 km^{2}) lying at right angles to the course of the Wabash River at Vincennes.

In the second article, the United States relinquished claims to any lands adjoining the tract defined in article one.

Article 3 cedes to the United States a salt spring upon the Saline creek, which falls into the Ohio below the mouth of the Wabash, with a quantity of land surrounding it not exceeding 4 square miles (10 km^{2}). The U.S. agreed to deliver to the Indians annually a quantity of salt not exceeding 150 US bushels (5.3 m^{3}).

Article 4 cedes to the United States the right of locating three tracts of land (of such size as may he agreed to by the Kickapoo, Eel River band of Miami, Wea, Piankeshaw, and Kaskaskia tribes), for the purposes of erecting houses of entertainment for the accommodation of travellers on the main road between Vincennes and Kaskaskia and one other on the road between Vincennes and Clarksville.

Article 5 allowed for alterations to the boundary lines described in the first article if it is found that settlements of land made by citizens of the United States fall in the Indian country. It was agreed that a quantity of land equal in quantity to what may be thus taken shall be given to the said tribes either at the east or the west end of the tract.

Notable among the Indian signatories were

- Meseekunnoghquoh (also known as Michikinikwa), or Little Turtle, for the Miamis
- Tuthinipee (also known as Topinabee), or He Sitting-quietly, for the Potawatomi
- Winnemac, or Catfish, for the Potawatomi
- Bukongehelas for the Delawares

== Subsequent treaties ==
The Eel River band of Miami, Wyandot, Piankishaw, Kaskaskia, and also the Kickapoo represented by the Eel River chiefs in a treaty of August 7, 1803 concurred in the cessions for houses of entertainment provided for Article 4 of this treaty.

At two treaties concluded at Vincennes in August 1805, the Delawares and Piankishaw ceded claims to lands south of the Vincennes Tract.

== See also ==
- Treaty of Vincennes

== Sources ==
- Kappler, Charles Joseph (1903). Indian Affairs: Laws and Treaties, Volume 2. U.S. Government Printing Office.
