= Treaty of Vincennes =

1803 and 1804 treaties between the U.S. and Native Americans

- Type: Recognition of American land claims
- Signed: June 7, 1803
- Location: Vincennes, Indiana Territory
- Condition: Transfer of money and goods to natives
- Signatories: William Henry Harrison; Little Turtle; Chekommia; Black Hoof
- Parties: United States of America; Miami; Wea (Piankeshaw, Kickapoo); Shawnee; Delawares
- Language: English

The Treaty of Vincennes is the name of two separate treaties. One was an agreement between the United States of America and the Miami and their allies, the Wea tribes and the Shawnee, and was signed on June 7, 1803. The purpose of the treaty was to get the native tribes to formally recognize the American ownership of the Vincennes Tract, a parcel of land captured from Great Britain during the American Revolutionary War. The second occurred on August 27, 1804, and was to purchase land from the tribes.

== Treaty of 1803 ==
The United States was represented by William Henry Harrison, the Governor of the Indiana Territory. Harrison had been granted authority to settle the American claim to the Vincennes tract by President Thomas Jefferson. The Vincennes tract had been purchased by the Kingdom of France from the Piankeshaw, a Wea tribe, around 1740. The tract was ceded to Great Britain as part of the peace settlement after the French and Indian War. George Rogers Clark captured the territory from the British in the American Revolutionary War, and the United States claimed the tract by right of conquest. In 1802, the government surveyor Thomas Freeman, began a survey of the land, called "Freeman's Lines and Corners". The survey led to objections from some of the native tribes as to the exact boundaries, and extent of the tract. Jefferson decided the best solution would be open talks with the tribes and compensate them for their claims on the land.

The Vincennes tract was a parcel of land that lay rectangular across the Wabash River. The majority of the land lay on the east bank, but a small parcel was also included along the west bank. The fortified town of Vincennes, an old French trading post, was the primary settlement in the area. In total, the tract contained about 1,600,000 acres (2,500 mi^{2}; 6,500 km^{2}) of land. The negotiations were successful and in exchange for compensation, the tribes recognized the American ownership of the tract.

== Treaty of 1804 ==
The Treaty of Vincennes signed in 1804 was to purchase additional lands for settlement. The area purchased was south of the Vincennes tract and the Buffalo Trace, north of the Ohio River, and east of the Wabash River. The treaty connected Clark's Grant and the Vincennes Tract. The area had many squatters living on native owned lands which led to rising tensions with the tribes; the treaty relieved pressure on the settlers, allowing them to freely settle the land.

== See also ==
- History of Indiana
- Treaty of Grouseland

== Sources ==
- Woodfill, Roger. "Greenville and Grouseland treaty lines". Surveyors Historical Society.
