= Treaty of Grouseland =

1805 treaty between the United States and Native Americans

- Type: Land purchase
- Signed: August 21, 1805
- Location: Grouseland estate at Vincennes, Indiana Territory
- Condition: Transfer of money and goods to natives
- Signatories: William Henry Harrison (USA); Little Turtle (Miami); Chekommia (Wea); Black Hoof (Shawnee); Buckongahelas (Shawnee)
- Parties: United States of America; Miami; Wea (Piankeshaw, Kickapoo); Pottawatomie; Shawnee; Lenape
- Language: English

The Treaty of Grouseland was an agreement negotiated by Governor William Henry Harrison of the Indiana Territory on behalf of the government of the United States of America with Native American leaders, including Little Turtle and Buckongahelas, for lands in Southern Indiana, northeast Indiana, and northwestern Ohio. The treaty was negotiated and signed on Aug 21, 1805, at Harrison's home in Vincennes, Indiana, called Grouseland. Negotiated a year after the second Treaty of Vincennes, it was the second major land purchase in Indiana since the close of the Northwest Indian War and the signing of the 1795 Treaty of Greenville.

== Treaty ==
The Miami Tribe, led by Little Turtle, held the principle claim to all the land that was purchased, but many other tribes inhabited the area. Before the signing of the treaty legal settlement in Indiana was limited to a tract of land around Vincennes, Clark's Grant, and Fort Wayne. Many settlers were moving outside of those areas and onto Native land. The result was rising tensions with the tribes, who considered the settlers trespassers. Harrison entered the negotiations in hope of appeasing the tribes and reimbursing them for their lands and address issues left outstanding following the 1804 Treaty of Vincennes, while guaranteeing the rights of the settlers to move into the region.

The treaty established a line running from the northeast corner of the Vincennes tract, called Freeman's Corner, and moved on a north-easterly route (N 57 00' 00" E) about 68 miles until it intersected with the Greenville Treaty line near Brookville. This line was called the Grouseland Line. All land north of the Ohio River, east of the Wabash River, and south of that line, was purchased for the United States. A second line was established running from the northwest corner of Fort Wayne on a southeasterly route toward Brookville, where it intersected with the Greenville Treaty line. All land due east of that line, including a small part of Ohio, was purchased as part of the treaty.

Shortly after the approval of the treaty, numerous settlements sprung up in the opened land, including Madison. In 1995 the Indiana Historical Bureau erected a monument where the Grouseland and Greenville lines intersect, commemorating Indiana's early pioneers.

== See also ==
- Treaty of Vincennes
- History of Indiana

== Sources ==
- Whiting, Isaac (1840). A Sketch of the Life and Public Services of William Henry Harrison. I. N. Whiting.
- Woodfill, Roger. "Greenville and Grouseland lines". Surveyors Historical Society.
