= Swedish–American Treaty (1827) =

Treaty between Sweden-Norway and United States

Swedish-American Treaty (1827)
- Signed: July 4, 1827
- Parties: United States (Union between Sweden and Norway) Sweden–Norway
- Ratifiers: United States (Union between Sweden and Norway) Sweden–Norway

The Swedish–American Treaty (1827) was a treaty signed between the Kingdoms of Sweden and Norway and the United States on July 4, 1827.

It governed commercial relations between the US and Sweden and Norway (later Sweden) until 1919, when the US revoked the treaty.

== Stipulations ==
- Ships of both countries are to be able to move goods in each others ports without restriction, with some exceptions for contraband.
- People of both countries are to follow the laws about navigation set by their own country.
- If a Swedish ship is in an American port with goods that are not unloaded there, it is not to be taken by American customs regulations.
- The Swedish monopoly on Saint Barthélemy is ended.
