= Bancroft Treaties =

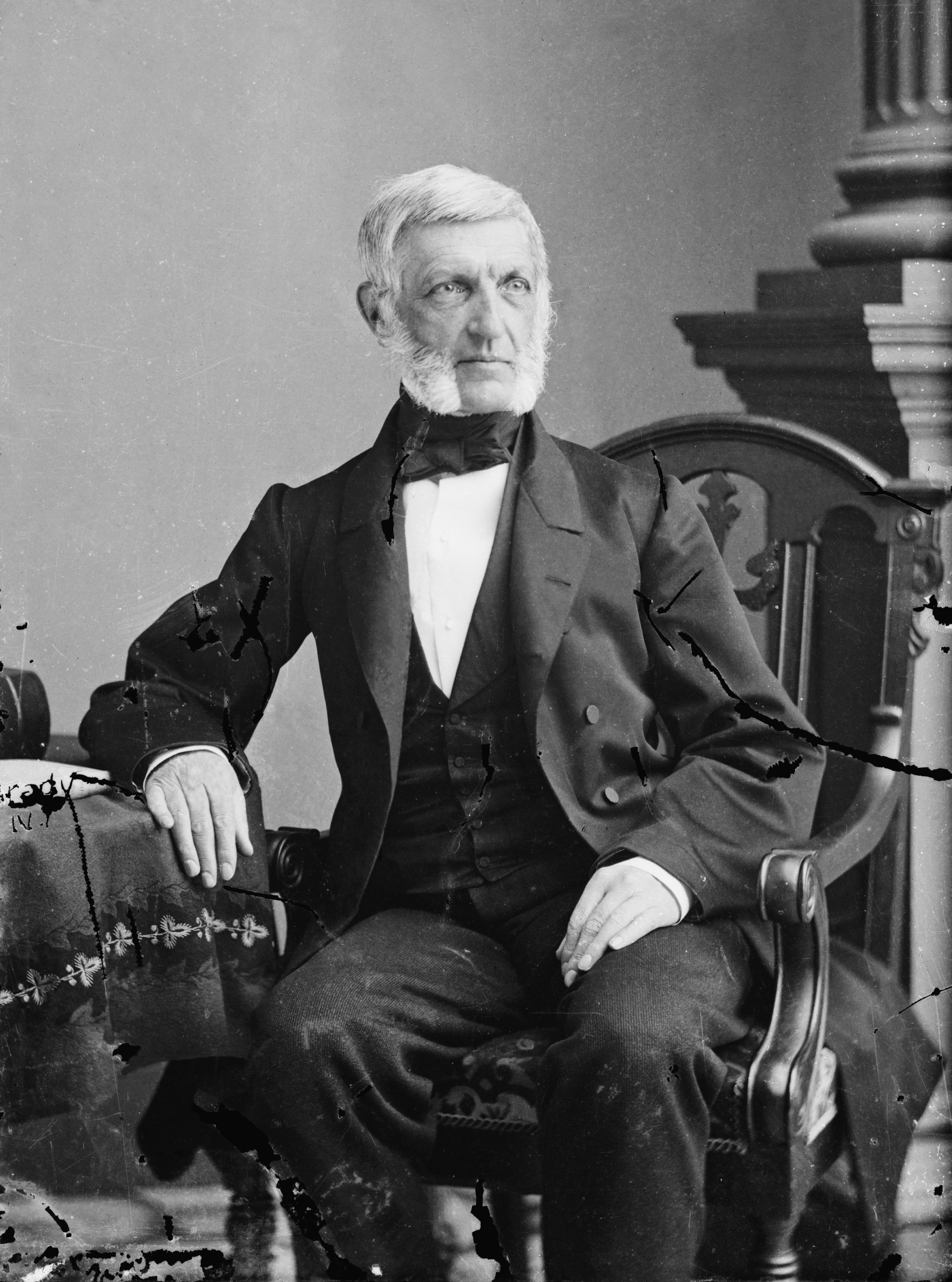
George Bancroft before his appointment as U.S. Minister to Prussia.

The Bancroft treaties, also called the Bancroft conventions, were a series of agreements made in the late 19th and early 20th centuries between the United States and other countries. They recognized the right of each party's nationals to become naturalized citizens of the other and defined circumstances in which naturalized persons were legally presumed to have abandoned their new citizenship and resumed their old one.

== Origin ==
Named for historian and diplomat George Bancroft (1800–1891), who negotiated the first of these agreements with Prussia, the Bancroft treaties were mainly intended to prevent individuals from using naturalization as a way to avoid military service and other legal obligations in their native countries.

From 1868 to 1937, the United States entered into 25 Bancroft treaties covering 34 foreign countries. A typical Bancroft treaty had three major provisions. The first specified the terms under which each party would recognize the naturalization of its citizens by the other. (Five years' uninterrupted residence in the adopted country was the usual requirement.) The second provided that naturalized citizens who returned to their native country could be prosecuted for crimes that they allegedly committed before they emigrated. The third and most important provided that naturalized citizens who returned to their country of origin and stayed there for two continuous years would be presumed to have resumed their former nationality. That would require them to meet any unfulfilled military service obligation in their native country and deny them the diplomatic protection of their adopted one. Article III of the 1908 treaty with Portugal was typical:

If a Portuguese subject naturalized in America, renews his residence in Portugal, without intent to return to America, he shall be held to have renounced his naturalization in the United States. Reciprocally, if an American naturalized in Portugal renews his residence in the United States, without intent to return to Portugal, he shall be held to have renounced his naturalization in Portugal. The intent not to return may be held to exist when the person naturalized in one country resides more than two years in the other country.

== Constitutionality ==
Conceived in an era when the right of individuals to change their citizenship was not universally recognized, the Bancroft treaties represented an important step forward in securing recognition by foreign governments of the right of their nationals to become American citizens. But American constitutional law eventually made the treaties obsolete.

In Schneider v. Rusk, 377 U.S. 163 (1964), the Supreme Court invalidated a section of the Immigration and Nationality Act of 1952 (the McCarran-Walter Act) that would strip naturalized Americans of their citizenship after three years' continuous residence in their country of origin; and in Afroyim v. Rusk, 387 U.S. 253 (1967), the Supreme Court, reviewing part of the Nationality Act of 1940, held that Congress has no power to strip anyone of their citizenship, whether it is acquired by birth or by naturalization. These decisions strongly suggested that any future case of involuntary loss of citizenship under one of the Bancroft treaties probably would not survive a Supreme Court challenge.

== Termination of the Bancroft treaties ==
Concluding that the Bancroft treaties were unenforceable, the administration of President Jimmy Carter, acting in consultation with the Senate Committee on Foreign Relations, gave notice in 1980 terminating the treaties with 18 of the 21 countries with which they were still in force. The exceptions were the treaties with Albania, Bulgaria and Czechoslovakia. The treaty with Albania was terminated in 1991 when Albania and the United States re-established diplomatic relations at the end of the Cold War. The treaty with the Czech Republic and the Slovak Republic as successor states to the former Czechoslovakia was terminated by the United States in 1997. In the last years of Barack Obama's Presidency the treaty with Bulgaria was terminated.

=== Termination by country ===
Termination by countries
Country	Date signed	Year Terminated	Termination
North German Confederation (Prussia)	February 22, 1868	1917	Never revived after First World War
Bavaria	May 26, 1868	1871	Proclamation of the German Empire
Mexico	July 4, 1868		Terminated by Mexico
Baden	July 19, 1868	1871	Proclamation of the German Empire
Württemberg	July 27,1868	1871	Proclamation of the German Empire
Hesse	August 1, 1868	1871	Proclamation of the German Empire
Belgium	November 16, 1868	1980	Terminated by President Jimmy Carter
Union between Sweden and Norway	May 26, 1869	1980	Terminated by President Jimmy Carter
Austro-Hungarian Empire	September 20, 1870	1917	Never revived after First World War
United Kingdom	February 23, 1871	1953	Terminated by the United Kingdom, December 15, 1953
Denmark	July 20, 1872	1980	Terminated by President Jimmy Carter
Haiti	March 22, 1902	1980	Terminated by President Jimmy Carter
Pan-American Conference (Note: The treaty was between the US and Argentina, Bolivia, Brazil, Chile, Colombia, Costa Rica, Cuba, Ecuador, El Salvador, Guatemala, Honduras, Mexico, Nicaragua, Panama, Paraguay, Peru, and Uruguay.)	August 13, 1906		Several countries left the treaty
El Salvador	March 14, 1908	1980	Terminated by President Jimmy Carter
Brazil	April 27, 1908	1951	Terminated by Brazil
Uruguay	August 10, 1908	1980	Terminated by President Jimmy Carter
Portugal	May 7, 1908	1980	Terminated by President Jimmy Carter
Honduras	June 23, 1908	1980	Terminated by President Jimmy Carter
Peru	October 15, 1907	1980	Terminated by President Jimmy Carter
Nicaragua	December 7, 1908	1980	Terminated by President Jimmy Carter
Costa Rica	June 10, 1911	1980	Terminated by President Jimmy Carter
Bulgaria	November 23, 1923	2017	Terminated by President Barack Obama
Czechoslovakia	July 16, 1928	1997	Terminated between Czech Republic and the Slovak Republic
Albania	April 5, 1932	1991	Terminated when Albania and the United States re-established diplomatic relations in 1991
Lithuania	October 18, 1937	1980	Terminated by President Jimmy Carter

== See also ==
- Reid v. Covert
- Trop v. Dulles
- Multiple citizenship (Dual nationality)
- Naturalization
- Conscription
- Allegiance
- Expatriation
