= Wampanoag treaty =

Treaty between Pilgrims and Wampanoag

The Wampanoag treaty was a treaty signed on April 1 [O.S. March 22], 1621 between the Wampanoag, led by Massasoit, and the English settlers of Plymouth Colony, led by Governor John Carver.

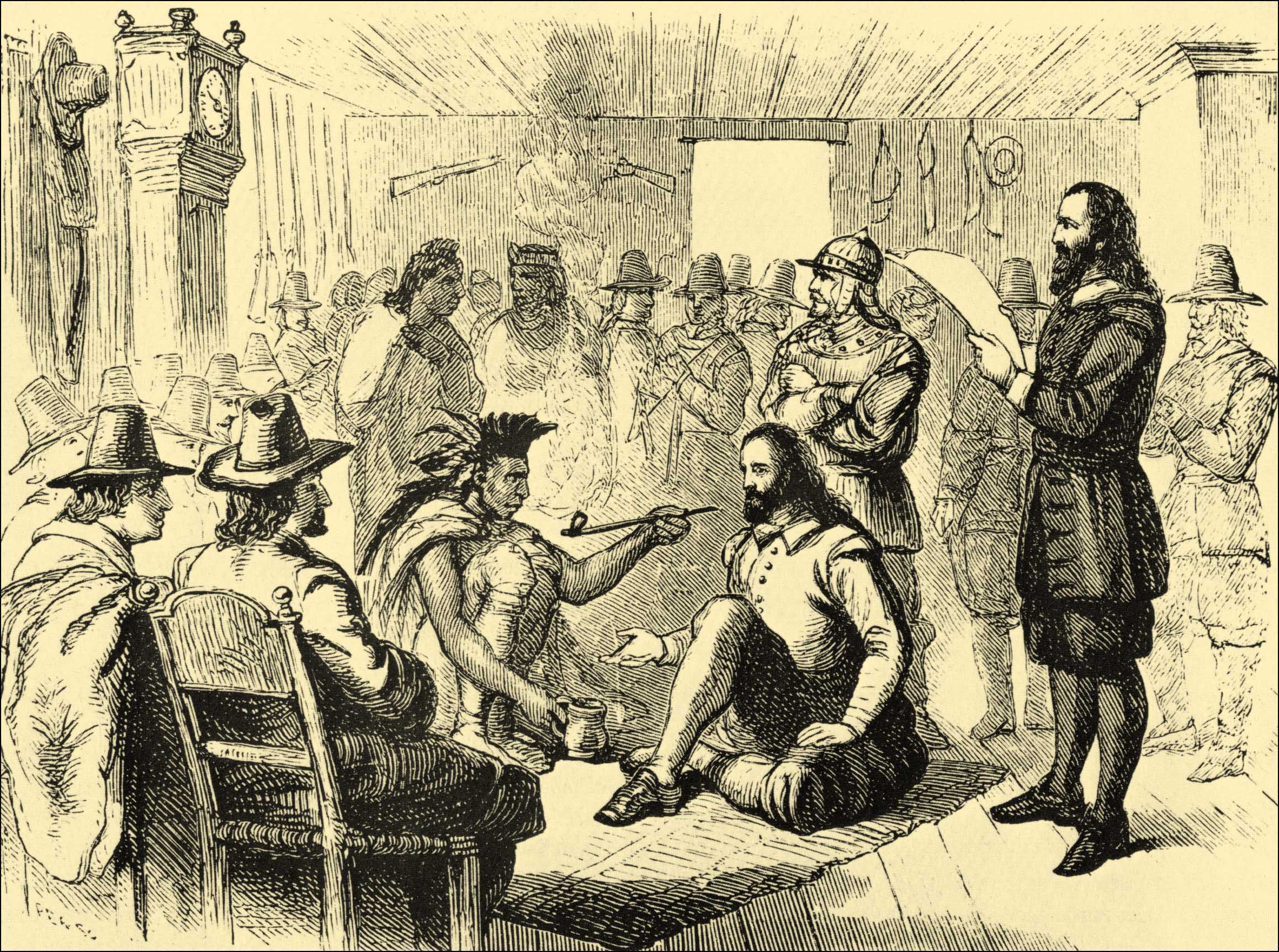
Massasoit handing a peace pipe to Governor John Carver in Plymouth, 1621

== Background ==
Both the Wampanoag and the Pilgrims had been struggling prior to the treaty's signing. Of the 102 passengers on the Mayflower, only 52 would survive past the first winter. Though the Pilgrims had intended to found a permanent settlement, they were all still living aboard the Mayflower or in temporary dwellings.

The Wampanoag were heavily weakened by an unknown disease outbreak (possibly smallpox or measles) from 1615–19 which wiped out up to 90% of the local population. The Narragansett people capitalized on this decimation of the Wampanoag and forced them to pay tribute. The Massasoit, or Great Sachem, of the Wampanoag was initially wary of the new arrivals as, previously, Englishmen under John Smith's lieutenant Thomas Hunt had lured 20 Patuxet into slavery. After Massasoit's sachems summoned spirits to try to drive the settlers away to no effect, he decided to make peace with the settlers. Massasoit, having heard rumors of English power, sought a treaty against the Narrangansett with the new arrivals.

== Signing and terms ==
Massosoit first sent Samoset, an Abenaki prisoner who had learnt some English from fishermen, to test the intentions of the English, promising Samoset freedom if he went. Samoset stayed the night with the pilgrims and informed them of the existence of Tisquantum, a Patuxet man who had learned English after being captured by Thomas Hunt. Tisquantum was quickly nicknamed Squanto by William Bradford and would prove an invaluable asset as a translator to the Pilgrims as his English skill far exceeded Samoset's. Massasoit would arrive a week after Samoset with a band of roughly sixty warriors and his brother Quadequina. Carver was initially reluctant to sign a treaty until the two parties agreed to lay down their arms and exchange hostages.

Edward Winslow recorded the terms of the treaty in Mourt's Relation as follows

1. That neither he nor any of his should injure or do hurt to any of our people.

2. And if any of his did hurt to any of ours, he should send the offender, that we might punish him.

3. That if any of our tools were taken away when our people are at work, he should cause them to be restored, and if ours did any harm to any of his, we would do the like to them.

4. If any did unjustly war against him, we would aid him; if any did war against us, he should aid us.

5. He should send to his neighbor confederates, to certify them of this, that they might not wrong us, but might be likewise comprised in the conditions of peace.

6. That when their men came to us, they should leave their bows and arrows behind them, as we should do our pieces when we came to them.

Lastly, that King James would esteem of him (Massasoit) as his friend and ally.

== Aftermath and legacy ==
Carver soon fell into a coma and died just weeks after the treaty's signing. The treaty was nearly broken just a year after it was signed when Massasoit demanded Bradford, who had become governor of Plymouth after Carver's death, turn over Squanto to face Wampanoag justice. Bradford was reluctant to turn over the man who assisted so greatly in the colony's survival past the first winter and delayed until the point was rendered moot by Squanto's death in 1622.

Having avoided this early hurdle the treaty remained in place for over fifty years, making it the only treaty between Native Americans and European settlers and their descendants to last beyond the lifetime of all signatories. The treaty was further affirmed when Edward Winslow went to Pokanoket to nurse a sick and blind Massasoit to health. In gratitude Massasoit revealed a plot by the Massachusett to attack both Plymouth and the neighboring Wessagusset colony. This plot would be foiled before it could materialize by Myles Standish and several of Massasoit's men. The treaty would not last long beyond after Massasoit's death in 1661. After the brief reign of Wamsutta as sachem, Massasoit's second son Metacomet would pursue a more hostile policy towards the colonists, ultimately culminating in King Philip's War.

The treaty was commemorated on the reverse side of 2011 edition of the Sacagewea dollar.
