= Treaty of Washington (1855) =

1855 treaty between the United States and Native Americans

The 1855 Treaty of Washington may refer to any of the four treaties signed between the United States and various Native American governments.

== Treaty with the Wyandot ==
Treaty of Washington also known as the Treaty with the Wyandot (10 Stat. 1159) was a treaty conducted in on January 31, 1855, in Washington, DC between the United States and the Wyandot. The treaty was ratified on February 20, 1855, and proclaimed by the President on March 1, 1855.

== Treaty with the Chippewa ==
Treaty of Washington also known as the Treaty with the Chippewa (10 Stat. 1165) was a treaty conducted in on February 22, 1855, in Washington, DC between the United States and the Pillager Chippewas and the Mississippi Chippewas. The treaty was ratified on March 3, 1855, and proclaimed by the President on April 7, 1855.

In this treaty, the two Ojibwe groups ceded a large tract of land covering northwest Minnesota, excluding the northwest-most corner of Minnesota, retained their usufruct rights upon the land, and had nine small Indian Reservations established for the said groups:

- Pillager Chippewas
  - Cass Lake
  - Leech Lake
  - Lake Winnibigoshish
- Mississippi Chippewa
  - Gull Lake
  - Mille Lacs Lake
  - Pokegama Lake
  - Rabbit Lake
  - Rice Lake
  - Sandy Lake

Of these reservations, Rice Lake Indian Reservation was never established. Gull Lake, Pokegama Lake and Rabbit Lake Indian Reservations were extinguished. Later, the three Pillager Chippewa Reservations were consolidated to form the Greater Leech Lake Indian Reservation.

== Treaty with the Winnebago ==
Treaty of Washington also known as the Treaty with the Winnebago (10 Stat. 1172) was a treaty conducted in on February 27, 1855, in Washington, DC between the United States and the Ho-chunk (Winnebago). The treaty was ratified on March 3, 1855, and proclaimed by the President on March 23, 1855. This treaty ceded the lands promised in the Treaty of Washington (1846) to the Ho-chunks for an Indian Reservation in central Minnesota and acquired from the Ojibwe through the Treaty of Fond du Lac (1847).

== Treaty with the Choctaw and Chickasaw ==
Treaty of Washington also known as the Treaty with the Choctaw and Chickasaw (11 Stat. 611) was a treaty conducted in on June 22, 1855, in Washington, DC between the United States, the Choctaws and the Chickasaws. The treaty was ratified on February 21, 1856, and proclaimed by the President on March 4, 1856.
