= Wea =

Native American tribe originally located in western Indiana

Wea Waayaahtanwa
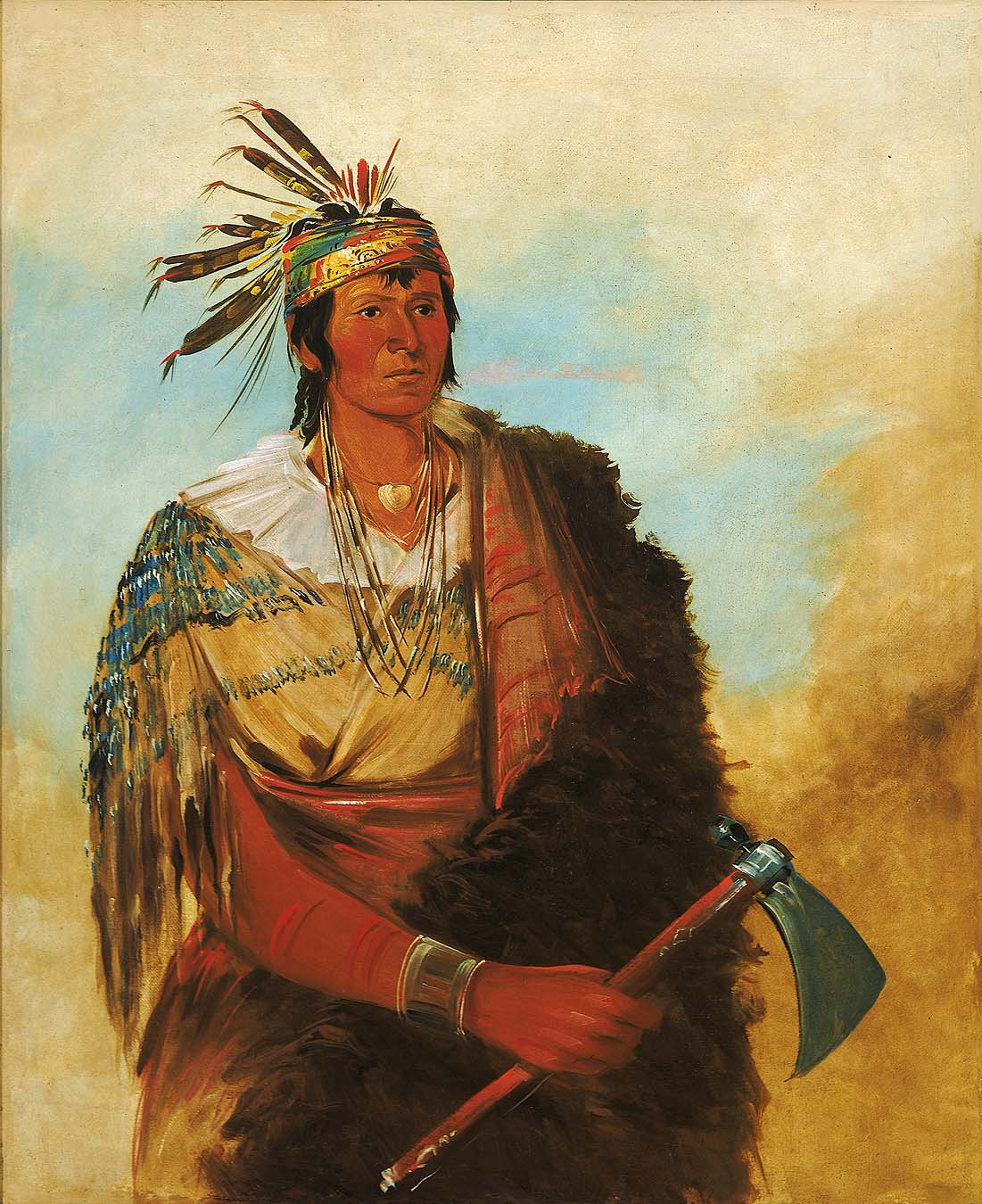
- Go-to-ków-páh-ah, He who Stands by Himself, a Wea warrior, oil portrait by George Catlin, 1830, collection of the Smithsonian American Art Museum.

Total population
- extinct as a tribe

Regions with significant populations
- United States (Indiana, Illinois, Ohio, descendants in Oklahoma)

Languages
- Miami–Illinois

Religion
- Traditional tribal religion

Related ethnic groups
- Miami, Peoria, Kaskaskia

The Wea (Miami–Illinois: Waayaahtanwa) were a Miami–Illinois-speaking Native American tribe originally located in western Indiana. Historically, they were described as being either closely related to the Miami tribe or a sub-tribe of Miami.

Today, the descendants of the Wea, along with the Kaskaskia, Piankeshaw, and Peoria, are enrolled in the Peoria Tribe of Indians of Oklahoma, a federally recognized tribe in Oklahoma.

== Name ==
The name Wea is used today as the a shortened version of their numerous recorded names. The Wea name for themselves (autonym) in their own language is waayaahtanwa, derived from waayaahtanonki, 'place of the whirlpool', where they were first recorded being seen and where they were living at that time.

The many different spellings of the tribe's name include Waiatanwa, Ouaouiatanoukak, Aoiatenon, Aouciatenons, Ochiatenens, Ouatanons, Ouias, Ouiatanon, Wah-we-ah-tung-ong, Warraghtinooks, and Wyatanons.

== Language ==
The Wea spoke a dialect of Miami–Illinois language, part of the Algonquian language family.

== History ==
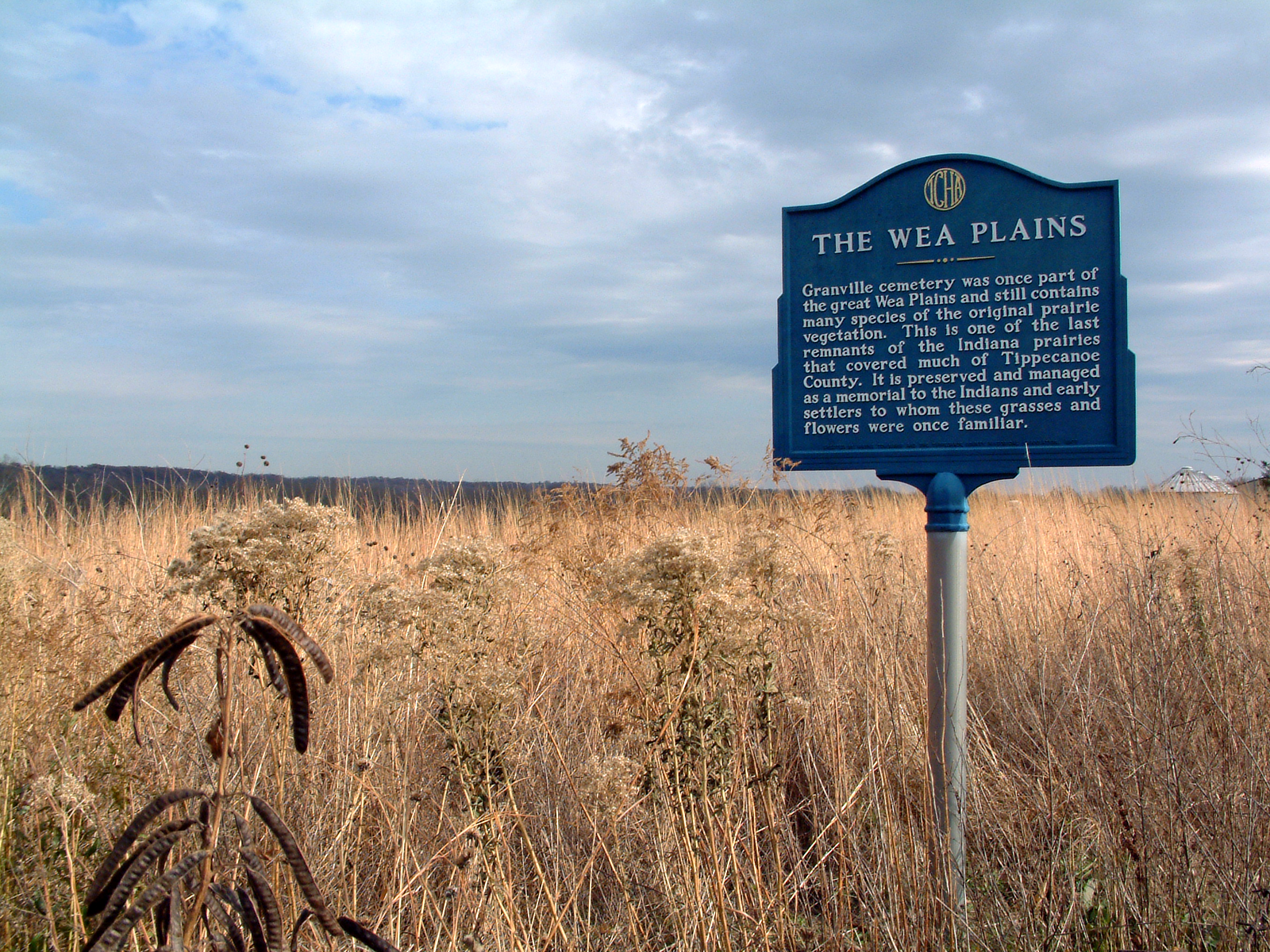
"The Wea Plains," a historical marker near the ghost town of Granville in Tippecanoe County, Indiana

The Wea lived north of the Ohio River in parts of western Indiana and southeastern Illinois. The first written mention of the tribe is from 1673. French explorers wrote about them in the 17th and early 18th centuries. Another Miami sub-tribe, the Pepikokia were a separate tribe until 1742 but then later became part of the Wea tribe. In the 18th century, the Wea, Miami, and Piankashaw remained distinct tribes. The Wea population of 1765 is estimated to have been around 1,200.

In the early 18th century, Wea people settled in villages along the Wabash River between what would become Terre Haute and Logansport, Indiana. They established a large settlement called Ouiatenon, near what is now Lafayette, and the French colonists established Fort Ouiatenon, which facilitated trade with the Wea and Kickapoo.

In 1747, British colonists began trading with a band of Miami living on the Great Miami River in Ohio. Weas began trading with them as well, until the French destroyed their trading post. By 1763, the Wea joined Odawa war chief Pontiac in Pontiac's War against the British. The Wea first were neutral during the American Revolution but later joined the Miami in fighting with the British. The Wea were forced to move to Missouri and Arkansas in 1820. They were later forced into Kansas and finally Indian Territory, which became Oklahoma.

With increased Euro-American settlement and the United States's policy of Indian removal, the US federal government made many treaties with these tribes.

In 1854, the Wea signed a treaty that merged them politically with other remnant tribes of the Illinois Confederacy to become the Confederated Peoria Tribe. The Miami people also joined the Confederated Peoria Tribe in 1873.

== Former village sites ==
Listed are just a few villages that were located in Indiana and Illinois.

- Chicago Chicago, Illinois
- Kenapacomaqua Logansport, Indiana
- Ouiatenon Lafayette, Indiana, where a marker notes the site
- Kethtippecahnunk Lafayette
- Sugar Creek Village/Reserve Sugar Creek, Indiana
- Weauteno / Jacco's Towne Terre Haute, Indiana (a marker is placed at Fairbanks Park)
- Upper Wea Village/Town 2 miles above Terre Haute
- Old Wea Town, Between Terre Haute and Vincennes
- Wea Reserve Parke County, Indiana (a marker notes the site)
- Wea Village Danville, Illinois
- Paola, Miami County, Kansas

In 2004, the Indiana Historical Bureau installed a marker in Terre Haute that commemorates the Wea Village and Chief Jacco Godfroy.

== Signed treaties ==
Below are some of the many Treaties were made between the US and the Wea.

- Treaty of Greenville, Aug 3, 1795
- Treaty of Fort Wayne (1803), June 7, 1803, represented by authorized agents.
- Vincennes Indiana Territory, Aug 13, 1803
- Treaty of Grouseland, Aug 21, 1805
- Vincennes Indiana Territory, Dec 30, 1805
- Treaty of Fort Wayne (1809), Sept 30, 1809
- Vincennes Indiana Territory, Oct 26, 1809
- Fort Harrison, Indiana Territory, June 4, 1816
- Vincennes Indiana Territory, Jan 3, 1818
- Treaty of St. Mary's Oct 2, 1818, ceded most lands in Indiana, Illinois, and Ohio, and established small reservation in Indiana on the Wabash River
- Vincennes, Indiana, Aug 11, 1820, ceded last land in Indiana, removed to Missouri and Arkansas
- St Joseph, Michigan, Sept 21,1826
- St Joseph, Michigan, Sept 24, 1828
- Treaty of Oct 29, 1832, acquired 250 sections of land in Miami County, Kansas
- Treaty of May 30, 1854
- Omnibus Treaty of February 23, 1867

Some mentions of Wea people in treaties include the following: Treaty of St. Marys 1820 in Article 3: "As it is contemplated by the said Tribe, to remove from the Wabash, it is agreed, that the annuity secured to the Weas, by the Treaty of Saint Mary's, above mentioned, shall hereafter be paid to them at Kaskaskia in the state of Illinois."

Treaty of Castor Hill 1832 in Article 4: "The United States will also afford some assistance to that part of the Wea tribe now residing in the State of Indiana, to enable them to join the rest of their tribe on the lands hereby assigned them,...."

== Notable Wea people ==
- Stone Eater, 18th-century Wea war chief
