= Piankeshaw =

Indigenous people of North America

Piankeshaw Peeyankihšiaki
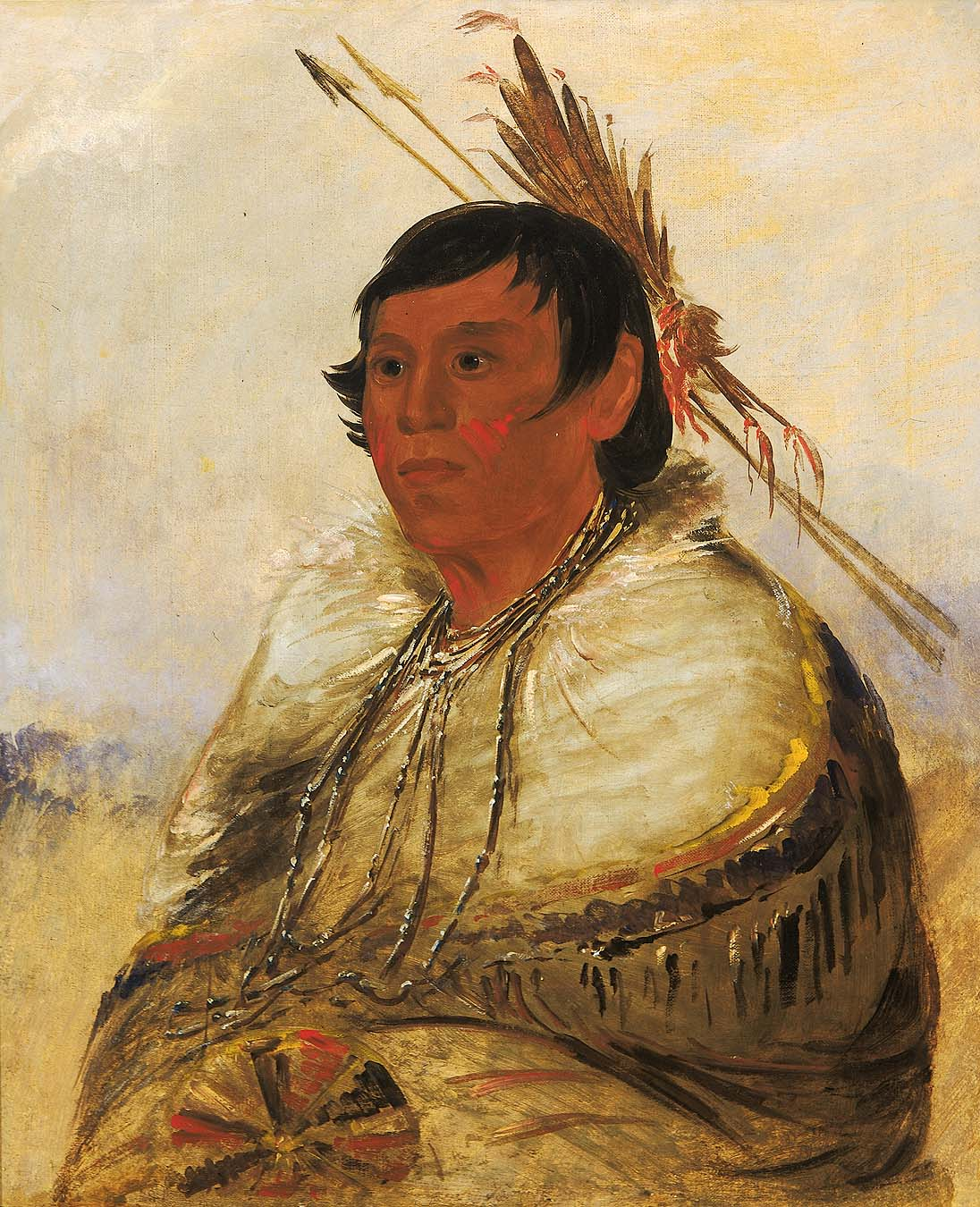
- Ni-a-có-mo, Fix With the Foot, a Brave by George Catlin, oil on canvas, 1830

Total population
- extinct as a tribe

Regions with significant populations
- United States (Indiana, Ohio, Illinois)

Languages
- Miami–Illinois

Religion
- Traditional tribal religion

Related ethnic groups
- Miami, Wea, Illinois

The Piankeshaw, Piankashaw or Pianguichia were members of the Miami tribe who lived apart from the rest of the Miami nation, therefore they were known as Peeyankihšiaki ("splitting off" from the others, Sing.: Peeyankihšia - "Piankeshaw Person"). When European settlers arrived in the region in the 1600s, the Piankeshaw lived in an area along the south central Wabash River that now includes western Indiana and Illinois. Their territory was to the north of Kickapoo (around Vincennes) and the south of the Wea (centered on Ouiatenon). They were closely allied with the Wea, another group of Miamis. The Piankashaw were living along the Vermilion River in 1743.

== History ==
The first Peeyankihšionki ("Place of the Piankashaw" or ""Piankeshaw Village"") was at the confluence of the Peeyankihšiaki Siipiiwi ("River of the Peeyankihšiaki, i.e. Vermilion River") and the Waapaahšiki Siipiiwi ("white shining", "pure white" or "River over white stones, i.e. Wabash River") northeast of the town of Cayuga, Indiana.

Sometime after the founding of Peeyankihšionki, a group split off and moved south following the Waapaahšiki Siipiiwi to just above its confluence with the Embarras River. In that spot they built a village called Aciipihkahkionki (Chippekawkay / Chippecoke; "Place of edible Roots"). This name referred to the abundance of tuberous plants that grew in the area. Today the city of Vincennes, Indiana lies in the vicinity of this historic Peeyankihšia village. Many of the descendants of the Peeyankihšia who built this village and the village to its north are citizens of the Peoria Tribe of Oklahoma. A smaller settlement was located at the confluence of the two main arms of the Vermillion River (near Danville, Illinois).

In the 18th century a third important settlement outside the historic Wabash River Valley was established along the Ahsenisiipi ("Rocky, Stony River; i.e. Great Miami River") and called Pinkwaawilenionki (Pickawillany, "Place of the Ash People") and developed into today's Piqua in western Ohio.

The Piankeshaw are usually regarded as being "friendly" towards European settlers. They intermarried with French traders and were treated as equals by residents of New France in the Illinois Country. A principal Piankeshaw village was established on the Wabash River near what became Vincennes. In fact, some have suggested that the land around the Grand Rapids Hotel that existed in the 1920s was part of a Piankeshaw Summer campground. Like their French neighbors, the Piankeshaw generally sided with the Americans during the American Revolution.

Although part of the Wabash Confederacy, the Piankeshaw nation took no part in the Northwest Indian War that followed the American Revolution. However, Piankeshaw suffered retaliation from colonizers for attacks made by other native tribes. President George Washington issued a proclamation forbidding harm to the Piankeshaw.

During the late 18th century, the Piankeshaw population began to decline. Many of the Piankeshaw simply left and joined other Miami tribes. After the Americans and French suffered setbacks in the Revolution, notably the disastrous LaBalme expedition, some Piankeshaw joined tribes aligned with the British. At that time, in the West, the British looked as if they would be the victors.

Others left during the economic depression caused by a depreciated United States currency and stagnated fur trade (due to unrest in the Northwest Indian Wars). The Piankeshaw suffered especially when 1781 brought a severe Winter followed by a Summer drought.

Despite overall good relations with the new United States, some Piankeshaw resented the new settlers encroaching on their territory. Vincennes residents attacked a nearby village in the 1786 Battle of the Embarras River. An exodus of Piankeshaw left the Vincennes area and moved to Terre Haute, where they joined the Wea, or moved to Kaskaskia, Illinois. They joined with other tribes in attacking American settlers later that year, but aborted the attack after French residents pleaded for peace.

By 1818, the Piankeshaw Chief Chekommia signed a treaty selling rights to much of their land to the United States.

=== Johnson v. McIntosh ===
The plaintiff Thomas Johnson had inherited land, which was originally purchased from the Piankeshaw tribes. The defendant William McIntosh claimed the very same land, he had purchased it under a grant from the United States government. In 1775 members of the Piankeshaw tribe sold certain land in the Indiana Territory to Lord Dunmore, royal governor of Virginia. In 1805 the Piankeshaw conveyed much of the same land to William Henry Harrison, Governor of the Indiana Territory, which made conflicting title claims. In reviewing whether the courts of the United States should recognize land titles obtained from Native Americans prior to American independence, the court decided that they should not. Chief Justice John Marshall had large real-estate holdings that would have been affected if the case were decided in favor of Johnson. Rather than abstaining from the case due to conflicting interest, the Chief Justice wrote the decision for a unanimous Supreme Court. Marshall found that ownership of the land is given to the ones that discovered it, which is a rule that had been repeated by all European countries with settlements in the New World. Marshall ruled that legally, the United States was the true owner of the land because it inherited it from Britain, whom he considered the original discoverers.

== Today ==
The descendants of the Piankeshaw, along with the Kaskaskia and Wea, are enrolled in the Peoria Tribe of Indians of Oklahoma, a federally recognized tribe in Oklahoma.
