= Great Peace of Montreal =

1701 peace treaty between New France and First Nations

The Great Peace of Montreal
La Grande paix de Montréal
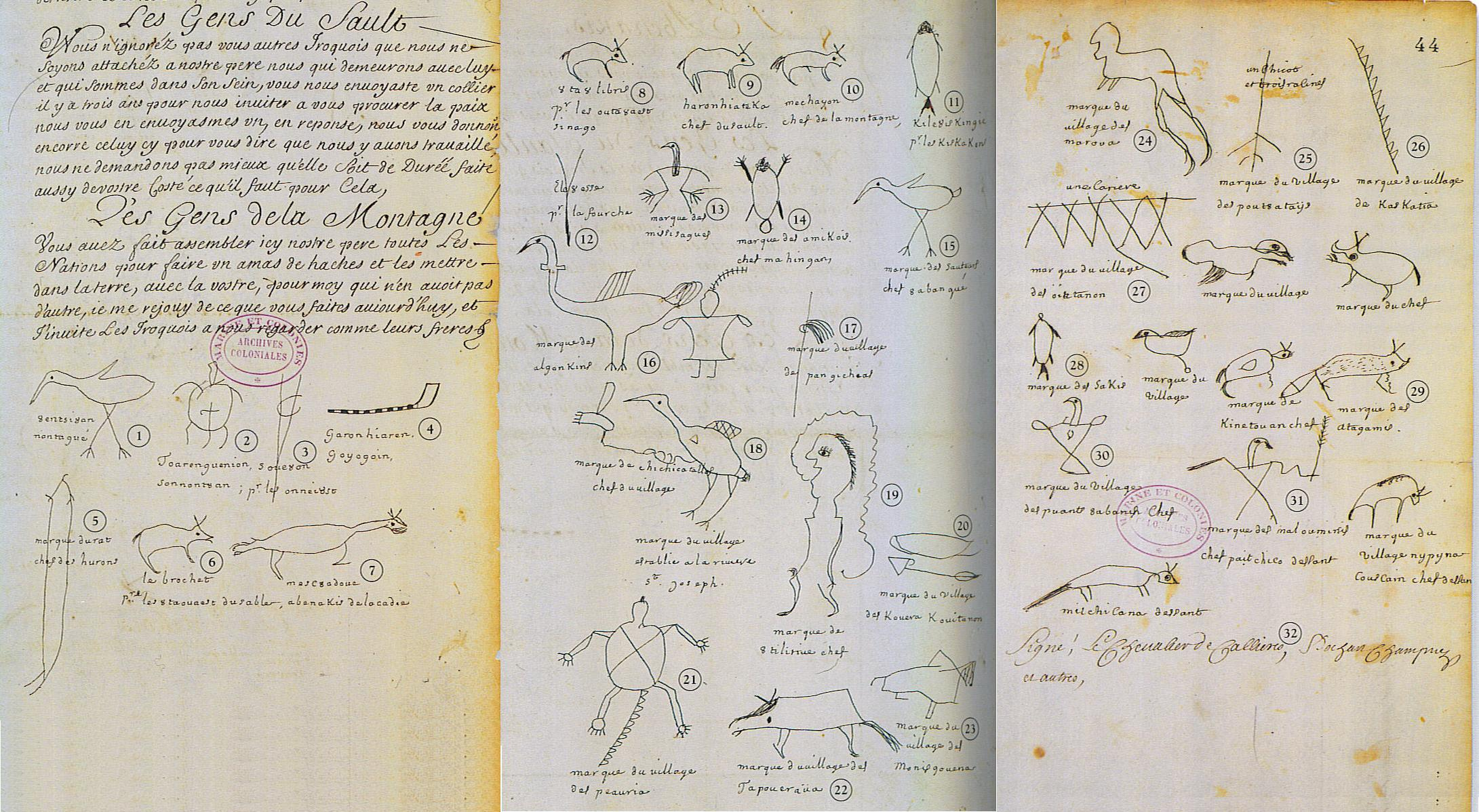
- Copy of the treaty including signatures
- Signed: August 4, 1701; 325 years ago
- Location: Montreal, New France
- Signatories: Kingdom of France; Haudenosaunee Confederacy; Nionwentsïo; Nitassinan; Omàmiwininiwak
- Language: French

The Great Peace of Montreal (French: La Grande paix de Montréal) was a peace treaty between New France and 39 First Nations of North America that ended the Beaver Wars. It was signed on August 4, 1701, by Louis-Hector de Callière, governor of New France, and 1300 representatives of 39 Indigenous nations.

The French, allied to the Hurons and the Algonquins, brokered a peace agreement between their allies and the Six Nations of the Haudenosaunee, with over 1,300 Native Americans present, representing over 40 nations. The peace was fragile, however; although all-out war did not break out, within only three years the Odawa attacked a Haudenosaunee village near a French fort in present-day Kingston, Ontario. The warriors planted a Huron club on a dead Haudenosaunee warrior to try to provoke new fighting.

This has sometimes been called the Grand Settlement of 1701, not to be confused with the unrelated Act of Settlement 1701 in England. It has often been referred to as La Paix des Braves, meaning "The Peace of the Braves".

== The Beaver Wars ==
The foundation of Quebec City in 1608 by Samuel de Champlain, one of the first governors of New France, marked the beginning of the gathering of resources of the Great Northern forests by traders from Metropolitan France. Control over the fur trade became a high-stakes game among the Native American tribes, as all of them wanted to be the European's chosen intermediary. The Beaver Wars saw the Hurons and Algonquins, supported by the French, pitted against the Haudenosaunee of the powerful League of Five Nations, who were supported first by New Netherlands and later by the English when they took New Amsterdam in the 1660s and 1670s, renaming it New York City.

In the first half of the 17th century, the Dutch-allied Haudenosaunee made substantial territorial gains against the French-allied First Nations, often threatening French settlements at Montreal and Trois-Rivières. In an attempt to secure the colony, in 1665 the Carignan-Salières Regiment was sent to New France. Their campaign in 1666 devastated a number of Mohawk communities, who were forced to negotiate a peace. A period of prosperity followed for France's colony, but the Haudenosaunee, now supported by the English, continued to expand their territory westward, fighting French allies in the Great Lakes region and again threatening the French fur trade. In the 1680s the French became actively involved in the conflict again, and they and their allied Indians made significant gains against the Haudenosaunee, including incursions deep into the heartland of Iroquoia (present-day Upstate New York). After a devastating raid by the Haudenosaunee against the settlement of Lachine in 1689, and the entry the same year of England into the Nine Years' War (known in the English colonies as King William's War), Governor Frontenac organized raiding expeditions against English communities all along the frontier with New France. French and English colonists, and their Indigenous allies, then engaged in a protracted border war that was formally ended when the Treaty of Ryswick was signed in 1697. The treaty, however, left unresolved the issue of Haudenosaunee sovereignty (both France and England claimed them as part of their empire), and French allies in the upper Great Lakes continued to make war on the Haudenosaunee.

== Prelude to peace ==
The success of these attacks, which again reached deep into Haudenosaunee territory, and the inability of the English to protect them from attacks originating to their north and west, forced the Haudenosaunee to more seriously pursue peace. Their demographic decline, aided by conflicts and epidemics, put their very existence into doubt. At the same time, commerce became almost nonexistent because of a fall in the price of furs. The Indians preferred to trade with the merchants of New York because these merchants offered better prices than the French.

Preliminary negotiations took place in 1698 and 1699, but these were to some degree frustrated by the intervention of the English, who sought to keep the Haudenosaunee from negotiating directly with the French. After another successful attack into Iroquoia in early 1700, these attempts at intervention failed. The first conference between the French and Haudenosaunee was held on Haudenosaunee territory at Onondaga in March 1700. In September of the same year, a preliminary peace treaty was signed in Montreal with the five Haudenosaunee nations. Thirteen First Nations symbols are on the treaty. After this first entente, it was decided that a bigger one would be held in Montreal in the summer of 1701 and all Nations of the Great Lakes were invited. Selected French emissaries, clergies and soldiers, all well-perceived by the First Nations, were given this diplomatic task. The negotiations continued during the wait for the big conference; the neutrality of the Five Nations was discussed in Montreal in May 1701. The treaty of La Grande Paix de Montreal of July 21 to August 7 of 1701 was signed as a symbol of peace between the French and the First Nations. In the treaty, the Five Nations agreed to remain peaceful between the French and the British during times of war together. It was a huge example of peace between different nations and honouring an agreement.

== Treaty ratification ==
The first delegations arrived in Montreal at the beginning of the summer of 1701, often after long, hard journeys. The ratification of the treaty was not agreed to immediately due to the discussions between the First Nations representatives and Governor Callière's dragging on, both sides being eager to negotiate as much as possible. The actual signing of the document took place on a big field prepared for the special occasion, just outside the city. The representatives of each Nation placed their clan's symbol, such as turtle, wolf or bear, at the bottom of the document. A great banquet followed the solemn occasion, with a peace pipe being shared by the chiefs, each of them praising peace in turn. This treaty, achieved through negotiations according to First Nations diplomatic custom, was meant to end ethnic conflicts. From then on, negotiation would trump direct conflict and the French would agree to act as arbiters during conflicts between signatory tribes. The Haudenosaunee promised to be neutral in case of conflict between the French and English colonies.

== Aftermath ==
The treaty was highly symbolic for the aboriginal nations as the Tree of Peace was now established among all the Great Lakes' nations. Commerce and exploratory expeditions quietly resumed in peace after the signing of the treaty. The French explorer Antoine Laumet de La Mothe, Sieur de Cadillac left Montreal to explore the Great Lakes region, founding Fort Pontchartrain du Détroit (now Detroit) in July. Jesuit priests resumed their spiritual mission-based work in the north. The Great Peace of Montreal is a unique diplomatic event in the history of both North and South America. The treaty is still considered valid by the Indigenous people of the American First Nations tribes involved.

The French in negotiating followed their traditional policy in North and South America, where their relationship with some of the natives was characterized by mutual respect and admiration and based on dialogue and negotiation. According to the 19th-century historian Francis Parkman: "Spanish civilization crushed the Indian; English civilization scorned and neglected him; French civilization embraced and cherished him."

== Attendees and signatories ==
- Haudenosaunee
  - Onondaga, Seneca, Oneida and Cayuga, represented by Seneca orators (Tekanoet, Aouenan, and Tonatakout) and by Ohonsiowanne (Onondaga), Toarenguenion (Oneida), Garonhiaron (Cayuga), and Soueouon (Oneida), who were signatories.
  - Mohawk, Teganiassorens
- Iroquois of La Montagne, represented by Tsahouanhos, not part of the Haudenosaunee
- Sault St. Louis (Kahnawake) Mohawk, represented by L'Aigle (The Eagle) (estranged from the Haudenosaunee)
- Amikwa (Beaver People), represented by Mahingan, and spoken for by the Odawas in the debates
- Cree, or at least one Cree band from the area northwest of Lake Superior
- Meskwaki (the Foxes or Outagamis), represented by Noro & Miskouensa
- Les Gens des terres (Inlanders), possibly a Cree-related group
- Wyandot people ( Tionontati and Wendat), represented by Kondiaronk, Houatsaranti and Quarante Sols (Huron of the St. Joseph)
- Illinois Confederation, represented by Onanguice (Potawatomi) and possibly by Courtemanche
  - Kaskaskia
  - Peoria
  - Tamaroa
  - Maroa
  - Coiracoentantanons
  - Moingwena
- Kickapoo (attendance is disputed by Kondiaronk)
- Mascouten, represented by Kiskatapi
- Menominee (Folles Avoines), represented by Paintage
- Miami people, represented by Chichicatalo
  - Miamis of the St. Joseph River (Sakiwäsipi)
  - Piankeshaw
  - Wea (Ouiatenon),
- Mississaugas, represented on August 4 by Onanguice (Potawatomi)
- Nippissing, represented by Onaganioitak
- Odawa
  - Sable Odawas (Akonapi), represented by Outouagan (Jean Le Blanc) and Kinonge (Le Brochet)
  - Kiskakons (Culs Coupez), represented by Hassaki (speaker) and Kileouiskingie (signatory)
  - Sinago Odawas, represented by Chingouessi (speaker) and Outaliboi (signatory)
  - Nassawaketons (Odawas of the Fork), represented by Elaouesse
- Ojibwe (Saulteurs), represented by Ouabangue
- Potawatomi, represented by Onanguice and Ouenemek
- Sauk, represented by Coluby (and occasionally by Onanguice)
- Timiskamings from Lake Timiskaming
- Ho-Chunk (Otchagras, Winnebago, Puants)
- Algonquins
- Abenaki, represented by Haouatchouath and Meskouadoue, likely speaking for the entire Wabanaki Confederacy

See "Nindoodemag": The Significance of Algonquian Kinship Networks in the Eastern Great Lakes Region, 1600–1701 (pp. 23–52) by Heidi Bohaker for a discussion of the significance of these pictographical signatures.

Marks and Signatures on the Great Peace of Montreal

Louis-Hector de Callière signed for France.

Mark: Wader.
Ouentsiouan signed for Onondagas.

Mark: Turtle.
Tourengouenon signed for Senecas.

Mark: A standing stone between a fork.
Signed for Oneidas.

Mark: Great Pipe.
Signed for Cayugas.

Mark: Rat.
Kondiaronk signed for Wyandot (Huron).

Mark: Bear.
Kinongé signed for Sable Odawas.

Mark: Bear.
Outaliboi signed for Sinagos Odawas.

Mark: Fish.
Kileouiskingié signed for Kiskakons.

Mark: A fork.
Elaouesse signed for Nassawaketons (Odawas of the Fork).

Mark: Thunderbird.
Onanguice (Potawatomi) signed for Mississaugas.

Mark: Crane.
Ouabangue signed for Ojibwe.

Mark: Beaver.
Mahingan signed for Amikwa.

Mark: Sturgeon.
Coluby signed for Sauk.

Mark: Fox.
Signed for Meskwaki.

Mark: Thunderbird.
Signed for Ho-Chunk.

Mark: Thunderbird holding stalk of wild rice.
Paintage signed for Menominee.

Mark: Scalp on a pole.
Signed for Piankeshaw.

Mark: Crane.
Chichicatalo signed for Miami.

Mark: Quarry or furrow (French: Carrière).
Signed for Wea.

Mark: Chief.
Outilirine possibly signed for Cree.

Mark: Tree and roots.
Signed for Potawatomi.

Mark: Bow and arrow.
Onanguice (Potawatomi) signed for the Kouera Kouitanon.

Mark: Turtle.
Signed for Peoria.

Mark: Unknown.
Signed for Tapouara.

Mark: Unknown.
Signed for Moingona.

Mark: Frog.
Signed for Maroa.

Mark: Notched feather.
Signed for Kaskaskia.

Mark: Unknown.
Mescouadoué signed for Abenaki of Acadia.

Mark: Crane.
Signed for Algonkin.

Mark: Deer.
Haronhiateka signed for Sault (Kahnawake)

Mark: Deer.
Mechayon signed for the People of the Mountain (Iroquois of La Montagne)

== Commemoration ==
A square in Old Montreal was renamed Place de la Grande-Paix-de-Montréal to commemorate the 300th anniversary of the peace. Several locations in Quebec are named for the Petun leader Kondiaronk, one of the architects of the peace, including the Kondiaronk Belvedere in Mount Royal Park overlooking downtown Montreal.

== See also ==
- List of treaties
- French and Indian War
