= Mitchigamea language =

Extinct indigenous language of North America

Michigamea
- Mitchigamea
- Mihshikamiia
- Native to: United States
- Region: Arkansas
- Ethnicity: Mitchigamea
- Extinct: 18th century?
- Language family: Unclassified

Language codes
- ISO 639-3: cmm
- Glottolog: mich1247

Mitchigamea or Michigamea is an extinct language formerly spoken by the Mitchigamea people in Arkansas.

In 1673, Jacques Marquette and Louis Jolliet asked a Mitchigamea man, who only spoke Illinois poorly, to be a translator between the Illinois-speaking French, and the Dhegihan-speaking Quapaw. Jean Bernard Bossu provided two sentences from the mid-18th century which, according to John Koontz, indicate that Michigamea was a Siouan language of the Mississippi Valley branch. Others argue that Mitchigamea might have been an Algonquian language instead.
