= Tamaroa =

Tamaroa may refer to:

- Tamaroa people, a tribe of Native Americans in the United States
- Tamaroa, Illinois, a village in the United States
- Tamaroa, Kiribati, a village in the Republic of Kiribati
- SS Tamaroa (1921-1957), a British ocean liner of Shaw, Savill & Albion Line
- USCGC Tamaroa, two US Coast Guard ships with this name
