= Nikinapi =

Illiniwek chief

Nikinapi was an Illiniwek chief who welcomed the Marquette-Joliet party in 1673 at a Peoria camp.
