= Mitchigamea =

Historical Native American tribe from Illinois

Michigamea
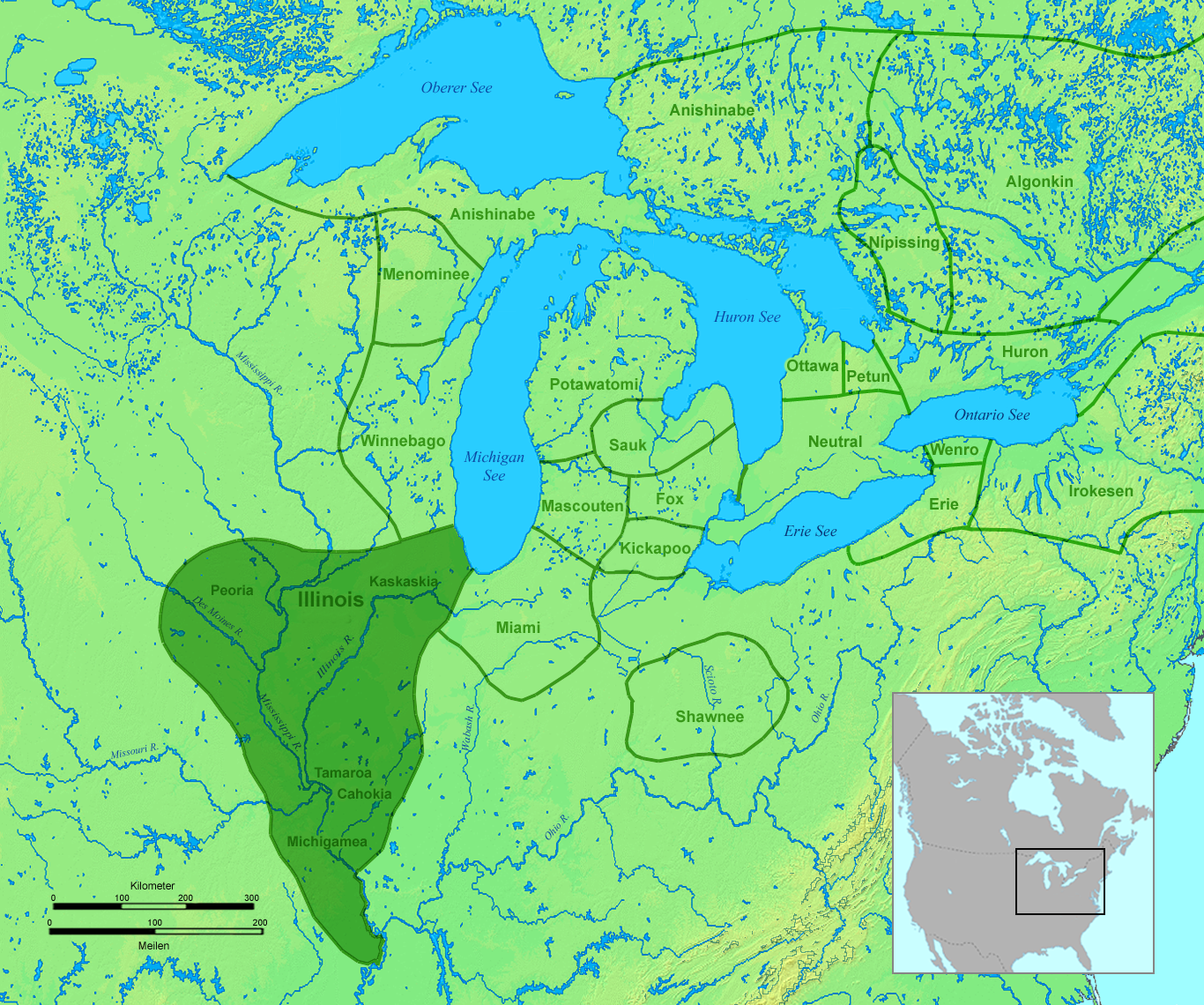
- Territory of the Illinois Confederacy, circa 1700

Total population
- No longer a distinct tribe, merged into the Peoria

Regions with significant populations
- Illinois, Arkansas

Languages
- Mitchigamea language

Religion
- Indigenous religion

Related ethnic groups
- other Illinois Confederacy peoples

The Michigamea were a Native American tribe in the Illinois Confederation. The Mitchigamea may have spoken an Algonquian or a Siouan-Catawban language, and historical accounts describe them as not being fluent in the Illinois language. Little is known of them today.

== Name ==
The name Michigamea derives from Algonquian words, michi meaning "great" or "much", and guma meaning "water." It is also spelled Mitchigamea or Michigamie.

== Territory ==
Originally they were said to be from Lake Michigan, perhaps the Chicago area. Mitchie Precinct, Monroe County in Southwestern Illinois takes its name from their transient presence nearby, north of the French Fort de Chartres in the American Bottom along the Mississippi. At one point in history, they lived near the Sangamon River in Illinois.

One of their villages in the American Bottom, inhabited from 1730 until 1752, is one of the region's premier archaeological sites; it is known as the Kolmer site. Other sites which have been proposed as being associated with the Mitchigamea include the Waterman site and Grigsby site.

The Mitchigamea are believed to have wintered in Illinois near the Tamaroas and summered in Arkansas near the Quapaw. This is based on archeological evidence, historical accounts, and historical maps. This seasonal settlement pattern likely provided good summer hunting and trading with the Quapaw which produced hides and meat, then maximizing trade advantages with the French during the winter.

== History ==
=== 17th century ===
The Mitchigamea made their first contact with Europeans when French explorer Jacques Marquette entered their territory in 1673. At that like their village was on the Mississippi River and St. Francis River in Arkansas. They the southernmost tribe within the Illinois Confederency.

The Jesuit Relations say: "At 5 miles from the village, I found the Tamaroa, who have taken up their winter quarters in a fine Bay, where they await the Mitchigamea, — who are to come more than 60 leagues to winter there, and to form but one village with them."

=== 18th century ===
The Quapaw drove the Michigamea north out of Arkansas by 1700. Along with the Chepoussa, with whom they eventually merged, they moved back into Illinois near the mouth of the Kaskaskia River.

Their best-known chief was Agapit Chicagou. Benjamin Drake, writing about the incident decades later in 1848, records that the Mitchigamea, along with the other bands in the Illinois Confederation, had been attacked by a general confederation of the Sauk, Meskwaki, Sioux, Ojibwe, Odawa, and Potawatomi, along with the Cherokee and Choctaw from the south. The war continued for many years until the Illinois Confederation was destroyed. Firsthand accounts from the time period indicate that after being reduced, some of the Mitchigamea were absorbed by the Kaskaskia and the majority were absorbed by the Quapaw. The Sauk overran the primary Michigamea settlement in 1752.

=== 19th century ===
By 1803, the Michigamea had merged into the Kaskaskia, who in turn merged into the Peoria.

Drake records that by 1826 only about 500 members of the Illinois Confederation remained. Drake implies that the war came about due to the cruelty of the Illini towards their prisoners, frequently burning them, and even feasting on their flesh when killed.

By the 1830s, the Peoria were forcibly removed to Kansas, and in 1867 they were forced onto an Indian Reservation in Indian Territory, which is in present-day Ottawa County, Oklahoma.

== Language ==
Their language was the Mitchigamea language. Due to the early loss of this language, it was poorly documented compared to other regional Indigenous languages. In 1673, Jacques Marquette and Louis Jolliet used a Mitchigamea man, who only spoke Illinois poorly, as a translator between the Illinois-speaking French, and the Dhegiha-speaking Quapaw.

Jean Bernard Bossu provided two sentences from the mid-18th century which, according to John Koontz, indicate that Michigamea was a Siouan language of the Mississippi Valley branch. However, their language is also argued to have been an Algonquian language.

== Modern descendants ==
The Mitchigamea do not exist today as a distinct social or ethnic group and do not have an independent federally recognized tribal government. Descendants of the Illinois Confederacy survive today as part of the federally recognized Peoria Tribe of Indians.
