= Aramepinchieue =

Aramepinchieue Rouensa (c. 1677 – 1725), also called Marie Rouensa, Marie Philippe, Marie Accault, Mary Aco, and Aramepinchone, was the daughter of a prominent Kaskaskia chief. She helped spread Catholicism and French-Indian cooperation in New France along the Mississippi River. She was particularly influential in the area near the former Fort St. Louis. She married a French trader; the children they had were among the earliest examples of the emerging Métis in New France.

== Life ==
Aramepinchieue was born in 1677 to a Kaskaskia chief called Mamenthouensa. At a young age, she and other Kaskaskia women in her village felt drawn to Christianity, as preached by the Jesuit missionary Jacques Gravier. Jesuit missionaries often stressed the Virgin Mary, while also emphasizing chastity and virginity. Conversion and intermarriage varied greatly by community, but many young women like Aramepinchieue converted to Catholicism before marriage. Aramepinchieue was the first indigenous woman to receive a sacramental marriage within the Roman Catholic Church for her marriage with a Frenchman in the Illinois Country. She took her First Communion on the Feast of the Assumption.

Aramepinchieue's father hoped she would marry in a way that would bring their family economic opportunities. He wanted Michel Aco, a French fur trader, to be Aramepinchieue's husband, but refused, as she wished to have a husband who shared her same piety. She said she had given "all her heart to God and did not wish to share it." Furthermore, Aco had the reputation of being an "apostate Catholic known for his mockery of the Jesuits." Her father, furious with his daughter's loyalty to Christianity over her family, threw her out of his home. Aramepinchieue sought refuge with Father Gravier and another indigenous Christian family. In this way, her Catholic identity allowed her to challenge her father's authority over her.

Eventually, at seventeen years old, Aramepinchieue reached a compromise with her parents: she would marry Aco if he would convert to Catholicism. Aco and the chief agreed to this. Aco converted to Catholicism, which a contemporary observer described as an impressive change to the rough trader from the frontier: "The first conquest [Aramepinchieue] made for God was to win her husband, who was famous in this Ilinois country for all his debaucheries. He is now quite changed..." Aramepinchieue's marriage helped build an alliance among the French traders, the Jesuit missionaries, and the Kaskaskias. The children of Frenchmen and Kaskaskia women were among the first Métis people in the Americas.

By this time in her life, Aramepinchieue primarily went by the name of Marie Rouensa. As a married and devoted Catholic woman, Aramepinchieue took as "special patronesses… the Christian Ladies who have sanctified themselves in the state of matrimony, — namely, St. Paula, St. Frances, St. Margaret, St. Elizabeth, and St. Bridget."

Later on in her life, Aramepinchieue later moved from Fort St. Louis to Cahokia, then closer to the present day town of Kaskaskia. After her husband died, she remarried a French trader named Michel Philippe. In total she had eight children: two with Aco (sometimes spelled Accault) and six with Philippe. She came to have great influence over the men in her household and over her entire community. She amassed a considerable estate, showing continuities with her indigenous heritage as well as French acculturation. Rouensa's property included several tracts of land along with "Two houses, 36 by 20 feet, with stone fireplaces that were located within the Kaskaskia village. Two barns, filled with hay, fed the livestock: oxen, thirteen cows, three horses, thirty one pigs, and forty-eight chickens...oxcarts and horse carts, and iron plows." She was also the legal owner of two African-American married couples, as well as an Indian woman slave. The three women probably planted and harvested oats, wheat, and maize, while the male slaves were more likely to work in the fur trade. They were also woodcutters, for there were nine tons of wood, cut and debarked, in the estate. In her barns was a large stock of wheat and oats, and the wheat was valued at 3,300 livres.

Aramepinchieueu died in 1725, at the age of about forty to forty-five years old. She was buried under the floor of the Immaculate Conception parish church in Kaskaskia, the only woman, French or indigenous, given that honor. After her death, Rouensa's will dictated that her considerable estate, created over many years of hard labor, be shared equally among her children.
