= Jacques Gravier =

Jacques Gravier, SJ (17 May 1651 – 17 April 1708) was a French Jesuit missionary in the New World. He founded the Illinois mission in 1696, where he ministered to the several tribes of the territory. He was notable for his compilation of the most extensive dictionary of Miami-Illinois among those made by French missionaries. In 1705 he was appointed superior of the mission and he died in 1708.

== Early life and education ==
Gravier was born in 1651 in Moulins, Allier, France. He became well educated with the Jesuits, entering the Society of Jesus in the fall of 1670. He made his novitiate at Paris.

From 1672 to 1680, Gravier taught and tutored in the Jesuit schools of Hesdin, Eu, and Arras. He then studied philosophy at the Collège Louis-le-Grand in Paris (1678–79). After teaching for a time, he returned there for his studies in theology (1680–84). After his third year of theology, Gravier was ordained a priest. Upon completing his studies, he set out for Canada, where he would be a missionary.

== Career in North America ==
Gravier carried out important tasks for the Jesuits in New France, including the founding of the Illinois mission. Such a mission was first proposed by Jacques Marquette.

When Gravier arrived in New France, he first studied at the seminary at Sillery, then studied the Algonquin language during 1685–1686. In 1686 he was sent to Michilimackinac. In 1687 he was called westward to the Ottawa tribes.

In 1689 Gravier was assigned to succeed Claude-Jean Allouez in the mission to the Illinois in the Mississippi Valley. First he worked among them at Starved Rock on the Illinois River, where he started compiling a grammar and dictionary. He worked to convert the Kaskaskias. In 1694, he helped broker the marriage of the Kaskaskia Aramepinchieue to the French trader Michel Aco, which helped to cement the alliance among the Jesuits, traders, and Kaskaskias. In 1696 Gravier was named to found the Illinois mission among the Illinois, Miami, Kaskaskia and others of the Illiniwek confederacy situated in the Mississippi River and Illinois River valleys. Bishop Saint-Vallier (La Croix), the Bishop of Quebec, named him vicar general of these missions.

Gravier's most enduring work was his compilation of a Kaskaskia-French dictionary, with nearly 600 pages and 20,000 entries. The manuscript is held by Trinity College in Hartford, Connecticut. It is the most extensive of dictionaries of the Illinois language compiled by French missionaries. The work was finally edited and published in 2002 by Carl Masthay, providing an invaluable source of the historic Kaskaskia Illinois language.

In November 1700 Gravier traveled by canoe to minister to French settlers and Native Americans in Mobile, La Louisiane, the colony along the Gulf Coast. There he befriended explorer Jean-Baptiste Le Moyne de Bienville, later the founder of New Orleans, who impressed him with his knowledge of Indian languages. In 1701 Gravier wrote a detailed account of the native Calumet ceremony. He left the colony and Mobile in February 1702 to return to the Illinois mission.

After continuing work among the Illiniwek, in 1705 Gravier was named Superior of the Illinois Mission. That fall during a time of tension, he was shot with an arrow and wounded by a Peoria warrior. Although Gravier sought treatment, the wound became infected and long caused him problems, through a return to Mobile, Alabama, then a trip to France. In February 1708, he returned from France to Mobile, where he died April 16.
