= USCGC Tamaroa =

Two ships of the United States Coast Guard have been named USCGC Tamaroa, ultimately after the Tamaroa tribe of the Illiniwek tribal group.

- USCGC Tamaroa (1921) was originally the 869-ton steam-powered United States Shipping Board tug Bartolme. She was acquired by the Coast Guard in 1921, renamed Tamaroa after Tamaroa, Illinois, and commissioned in 1922. She remained in service until 1935.
- USCGC Tamaroa (WMEC-166), originally the U.S. Navy salvage tug USS Zuni (ATF-95), was launched in 1943 and transferred to the Coast Guard in 1946. Best known for a rescue conducted during the 1991 Perfect Storm, Tamaroa was decommissioned in 1994 and sunk as an artificial reef on 2017.
