= Michel Aco =

French explorer

Michel Aco (fl. 1680–1702, also known as Michel Accault) was a French explorer who, along with René Robert Cavelier, Sieur de La Salle and Father Louis Hennepin, explored the Mississippi River in 1679. Aco became La Salle's lieutenant because of his knowledge of Native American languages and his abilities as an explorer. When the party reached the Illinois River; Aco, Hennepin and another man were sent to explore the upper Mississippi. During their exploration, they became the first Europeans to see Carver's Cave and Saint Anthony Falls. They were later captured by Sioux Indians and held until the influence of Daniel Greysolon, Sieur du Lhut won their release. He was brought to the mouth of the Wisconsin River and went on to explore the Wisconsin River, the Fox River down to Green Bay, Wisconsin, and Mackinac Island, Michigan, and finally, in 1681, to Montreal. After his exploring days were over, Aco settled in Illinois and became a trader. He married Aramepinchieue, the daughter of a Kaskaskia chief in 1693, and had two children with her.
