= Amikwa =

Historical indigenous people of North America

Amikwa signature of a beaver on the Great Peace of Montreal.

The Amikwa (Ojibwe: Amikwaa, "Beaver People"; from amik, "beaver"), also as Amicouës, Amikouet, etc., were a Native American clan, one of the first recognized by Europeans in the 17th century. The Amikwa were Anishinaabeg peoples, and spoke an Ojibwe language. In the Jesuit Relations, the Amikwa were referred to as the Nez Perce (not to be confused with the Pacific Northwest Nez Perce people). They inhabited the north shore of Lake Huron, opposite Manitoulin Island, along the shores between Missisagi and French Rivers, and along Spanish River. In September 1753, Bacqueville de la Potherie claimed that they inhabited the shores of Lake Nipissing. They were a large, powerful group allied with the Nipissings and related to the Outchougai, Mandua, and Atchiligouan peoples. The Amikwa were nearly wiped out by disease and wars with the Haudenosaunee and the last of the tribe appear to have merged with the Nipissings or the Ojibwe.
