= Moingona =

Mooyiinkweena
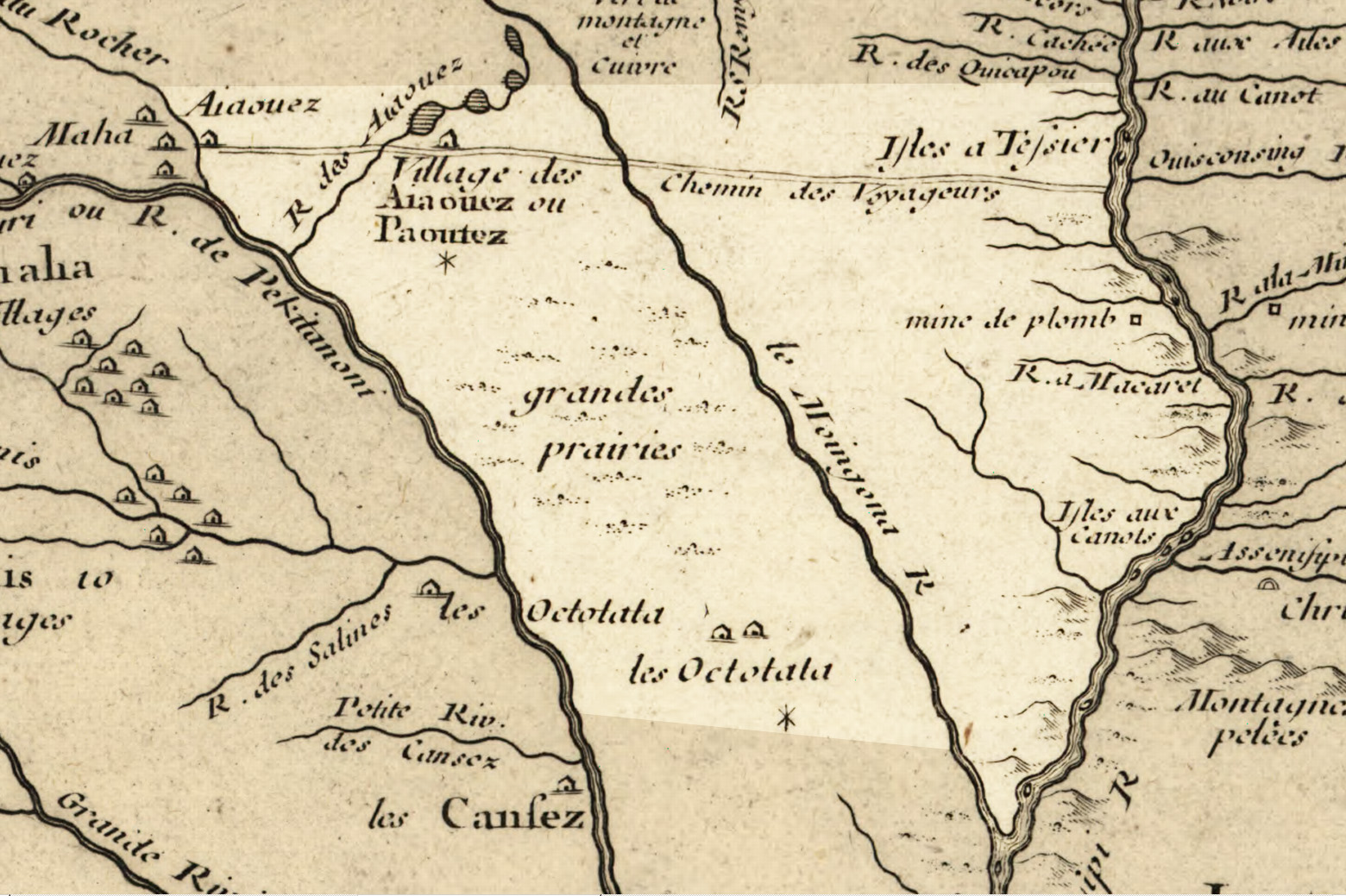
- 1718 French map showing a river named Moingona, the present-day Des Moines River. Highlighted area is present state of Iowa

Total population
- extinct as a tribe, merged into the Peoria tribe

Regions with significant populations
- United States (Iowa)

Related ethnic groups
- Peoria Tribe of Indians of Oklahoma, other tribes within the Miami-Illinois Confederacy

The Moingona or Moingwena (Miami-Illinois: mooyiinkweena) were a historic Miami-Illinois tribe. They may have been close allies of or perhaps part of the Peoria. They were assimilated by that tribe and lost their separate identity about 1700. Today their descendants are enrolled in the Peoria Tribe of Indians of Oklahoma, a federally-recognized tribe.

== History ==
=== 17th-century ===
French missionary Jacques Marquette documented in 1672 that the Peolualen (the modern Peoria). and the Mengakonkia (Moingona) were among the Ilinoue (Illinois) tribes who all "speak the same language."

In 1673 Marquette and Louis Jolliet left their canoes and followed a beaten path away from the river out onto the prairie to three Illinois villages within about a mile and a half of each other. Marquette identified only one of the villages at the time, the peouarea, but a later map apparently by him identified another as the Moingwena. He said of the 1673 meeting that there was "some difference in their language," but that "we easily understood each other."

Father Jacques Gravier reports helping the close allies "Peouaroua and Mouingoueña" deal with a common adversary in 1700.

=== 18th-century history ===
Pierre François Xavier de Charlevoix, a missionary who explored the region in 1721, recorded that "le Moingona" was "an immense and magnificent Prairie, all covered with Beef and other Hoofed Animals." He italicized the term to indicate it was a geographical term and noted that "one of the tribes bears that name." Charlevoix was a professor or belles lettres, and his spelling has come to be a preferred spelling in general and scholarly discussions.

== Name ==
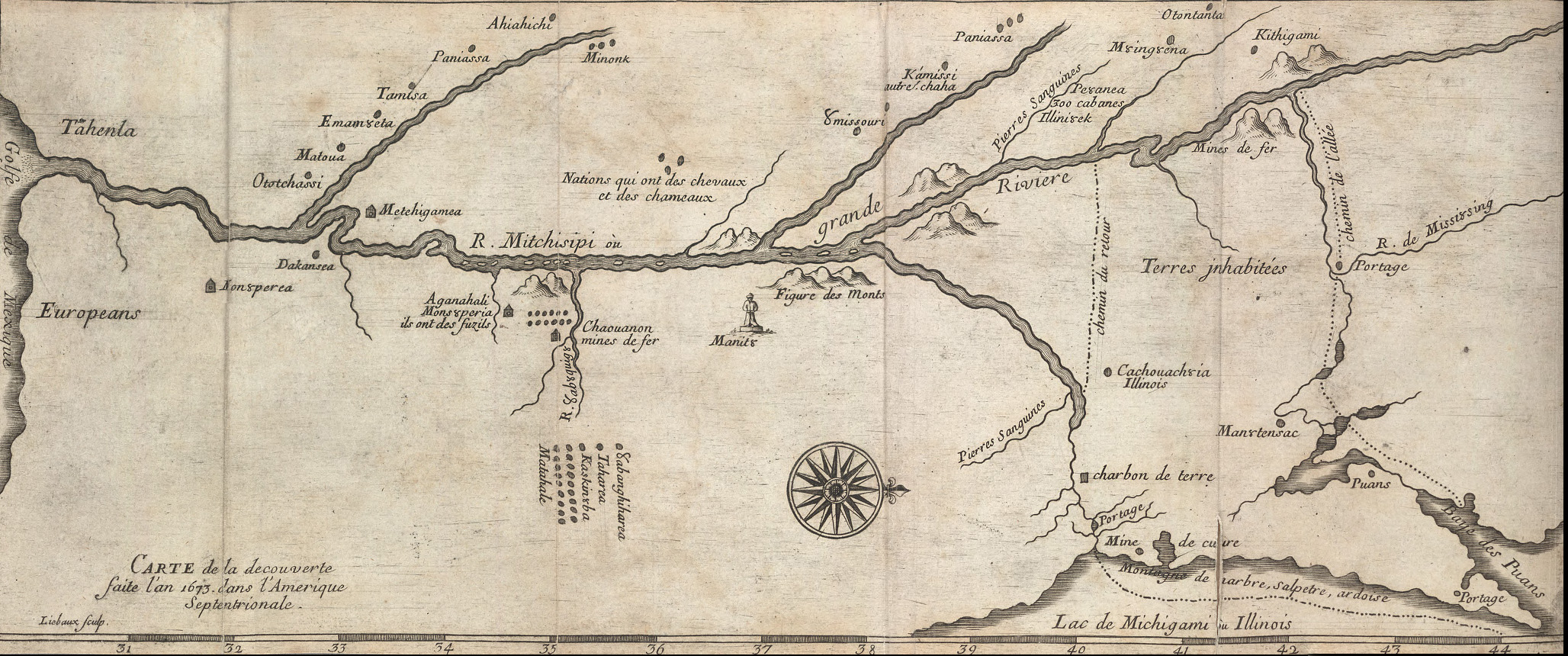
Ca. 1681 map of Marquette and Jolliet's 1673 expedition showing a Moingona village along what is now the Des Moines River.

The name Moingona was probably the basis for the name of the city of Des Moines, Iowa, the Des Moines River, and Des Moines County, Iowa.

Other names for them mentioned in 1672–73 records were "Mengakoukia," and "Mangekekis."

The meaning of "Moingona" has been debated. Historic accounts suggest that Moingona was a term referring to people who lived by or encountered near the portage around the Des Moines Rapids. The noted cartographer Joseph Nicollet supported this interpretation, as did the Algonquian linguist Henry Schoolcraft. Schoolcraft and Nicollet's report says that Moingona:

is a corruption of the Algonkin word Mikonang, signifying at the road; ... alluding, in this instance, to the well-known road in this section of country, which they used to follow as a communication between the head of the lower rapids and their settlement on the river that empties itself into the Mississippi, so as to avoid the rapids; and this is still the practice of the present inhabitants of the country.

An alternative interpretation is that Moingona is derived from the Algonquian clan name "Loon"; the Miami language term for loon is maankwa, and many Algonquian villages took their names from tribal clans.

A controversial theory is that the root of the expression means "filth" or "excrement," and the expression means "excrement face." In this theory, the name "Moingona", or, especially in its older French spelling, "Moinguena", is from Illinois mooyiinkweena "one who has shit on his face". This etymology is supported by Gravier's word "m8ing8eta", which he translates as "visage plein d'ordure, metaphor sale, vilain. injure". This verb, phonetically mooyiinkweeta, morphologically consists of mooy- "shit", -iinkwee- "face", and the third person singular intransitive suffix -ta, for a meaning "he who has shit on his face". The form "Moinguena", phonetically mooyiinkweena, is the same verb but with the independent indefinite subject ending -na, for a more precise meaning "one who has shit on his face". The spelling "Moinguena" is exactly how the French spelling of the time would render the Illinois verb mooyiinkweena. Perhaps this name arose as an insult given to the Moinguena by some neighboring tribe, as thus it is not known what the Moinguena called themselves. This scenario is rejected by the historian Jim Fay, who confirmed that no historical record documents the term being used and Algonquian linguists do not support its use. Missionaries likely misinterpreted terms.
