= Miami–Illinois language =

Algonquian language of the Midwestern US

Miami–Illinois
- myaamia
- Pronunciation: [mjɑːmia]
- Native to: United States
- Region: Illinois, Indiana, Kansas, Michigan, Ohio, Oklahoma
- Ethnicity: Illinois Confederation, Myaamiaki, Wea
- Extinct: 1960
- Revival: 500 users (2016)
- Language family: Algic: Algonquian; Miami–Illinois

Language codes
- ISO 639-3: mia
- Glottolog: miam1252
- ELP: Miami-Illinois

Miami–Illinois or Mihtohseenian (endonym: myaamia, (Note: The name of the language (as opposed to that of the tribe) is normally not capitalized in written Miami.) [mjɑːmia]) is an Indigenous Algonquian language that is spoken in the United States, historically in Illinois, Missouri, Indiana, western Ohio and adjacent areas along the Mississippi River by the Miami and Wea as well as the tribes of the Illinois Confederation, including the Kaskaskia, Peoria, Tamaroa, Cahokia, and possibly Mitchigamea. Although the last native speaker died in the 1960s, there has been an effort by the Myaamia (Miami) Nation of Oklahoma and the Miami Nation of Indians of the State of Indiana (a nonprofit organization) to revive the language and preserve their native heritage by teaching it to young and old members. As of 2016, it is estimated that around 500 members of the tribe use the language on a regular basis.

== Classification ==
Miami–Illinois is an Algonquian language within the larger Algic family. It is usually described as a Central Algonquian language, but that grouping denotes a geographic rather than genetic affiliation. A thorough genetic classification of Central Algonquian languages has not yet been achieved, and so Miami–Illinois' closest relatives have not been conclusively established. Lexically, Miami–Illinois most closely resembles the Sauk–Fox–Kickapoo language; its phonology and morphology, however, are more reminiscent of Ojibwe–Potawatomi–Ottawa.

The term Miami–Illinois covers the language varieties spoken by several different groups throughout history. Illinois denotes specifically the language common to the Illinois Confederation described in 17th- and 18th-century French missionary sources, and the subsequent dialect of the consolidated Peoria tribe; Miami denotes the precontact dialects of the Miami, Wea, and Piankeshaw indigenous to Indiana. Due to the low quality of many records and the complex post-contact history of the groups concerned, the dialectology of Miami–Illinois is difficult to reconstruct for any historical period, but by the end of the 19th century dialectal diversity was minimal, being limited to a modest three-way division between Peoria, Miami proper, and Wea.

== History and documentation ==
The history of the Miami–Illinois language prior to revitalization can be divided into three periods: the Illinois Confederation and early contact, population decline and relocation to Oklahoma in the 19th century, and language loss leading to extinction in the 20th century.

The Miami–Illinois of the first period is recorded primarily by French Catholic missionaries in what is now Illinois, beginning with a collection of prayers, instruction, and catechisms written by Claude-Jean Allouez (possibly with Sébastien Rale's assistance) in Kaskaskia in the late 17th century. A much more extensive document – an Illinois-French dictionary of nearly 600 pages and 20,000 entries – was compiled by Jacques Gravier in the early 18th century. Based on an analysis of its handwriting, it appears to have been transcribed by his assistant, Jacques Largillier. Gravier's original dictionary is held by Trinity College in Hartford, Connecticut. Two other notable sources from this time period are extant: a 185-page word list compiled by Antoine-Robert Le Boullenger with about 3,300 items, along with 42 pages of untranslated religious material, and an anonymous 672-page dictionary probably intended as a field lexicon. Despite representing Miami–Illinois as it was spoken more than three centuries ago, these sources are readily intelligible with a knowledge of modern Miami.

Probably obtained from the Kaskaskia tribe, among whom the French had set up a mission, these documents doubtless approximate the lingua franca of the Illinois Confederation as a whole. Individual tribes within the Confederation, however, may well have spoken distinct dialects or other languages altogether. The linguistic affinity of the Mitchigamea in particular has been questioned, since Jacques Marquette mentions a Mitchigamea interpreter who understood little Illinois.

During the late 18th and early 19th centuries, the Miami–Illinois people experienced a rapid population decline due to introduced diseases, depredations by neighboring tribes (especially the Iroquois), the Northwest Indian War, and subsequent Anglo-American colonisation. In contrast to the French missionary literature, Anglo-American documentation of the language from this period varies widely in both extent and quality. The Miami chief Little Turtle's visit to Philadelphia created some interest in his culture, leading to two word lists of reasonable quality - one apparently commissioned by Thomas Jefferson. The most significant materials of the early 19th century are the linguistic and ethnographic notes of Charles Trowbridge and an anonymous 42-page Wea Primer written for Protestant missionaries in Kansas in 1837.

The first migrations out of the original Miami–Illinois heartland took place at this time. By 1832, there were virtually no Miami–Illinois speakers in Illinois; those who had survived the collapse of the previous decades had emigrated to Kansas via Missouri. The formerly diverse tribes of the Illinois Confederation had consolidated, and identified simply as "Peoria" or "Kaskaskia". In 1867, these groups left Kansas and entered the Indian Territory to settle in the Quapaw Agency, where they would be joined by the Piankeshaw and Wea simultaneously forced out of Indiana. The tribes subsequently amalgamated to form the modern Peoria tribe. The Miami proper, meanwhile, split in 1847 between those remaining in northern Indiana and those leaving for Kansas; the latter group moved to the Quapaw Agency in the 1870s, but did not assimilate to the Peoria, and are now incorporated as the Miami Tribe of Oklahoma. The Miami who remained in Indiana now identify as the Miami Nation of Indiana, but lack federal recognition as such.

The use of the Miami–Illinois language declined precipitously after the migration to Oklahoma because of the concentration of various tribes, each with a different native language, in a single relatively small area (now Ottawa County, Oklahoma). English served naturally as the lingua franca of the Quapaw Agency, and minority languages soon underwent attrition. Nonetheless, the Miami–Illinois of this period has left valuable documentation due to the work of trained linguists and ethnographers in the area. Albert Gatschet recorded several examples of connected speech, including mythological narratives, and Truman Michelson elicited grammatical material and stories. These relatively long documents are valuable for reconstructing speech patterns in Miami-Illinois.

Due to a comparative lack of contemporary interest in the language, it is difficult to identify the last native speakers of Miami–Illinois in either Indiana or Oklahoma, or the contexts in which the language last saw everyday use. The documentation of the 1950s and 1960s shows a language in the advanced stages of attrition, as seen in Herbert Bussard's notes on the speech of Ross Bundy (possibly the last speaker in Indiana). The grammatical complexity of Bundy's Miami was significantly reduced and analogised to English in comparison to "standard" (i.e. 19th-century and revitalised) Miami–Illinois. The language as a whole was moribund by the 1930s, and probably no longer natively spoken by the 1970s.

The revitalization effort is based on the work of linguist David Costa. Based on his extensive studies, he published The Miami-Illinois Language in 1994 as his Ph.D. dissertation and as a book in 2003. The book reconstructs the structure of Miami–Illinois.

== Language revitalization ==
Many Miami members have described the language as "sleeping" rather than "extinct" since it was not irretrievably lost.

The Myaamia Center is a joint venture between the tribe and Miami University. The Center seeks to "deepen Myaamia connections through research, education, and outreach." It is directed by Daryl Baldwin, who taught himself Miami from historic documents and studies held by the Smithsonian's National Anthropological Archives, and has developed educational programs. Baldwin's children were raised as native speakers of Miami. Center staff develop language and culture resources using material that is often from translated missionary documents.

Published language and culture resources include:

- a children's book of Miami language and culture;
- an audio CD set with vocabulary, phrases, conversation, and the Miami origin story and a companion text; and
- a compilation of traditional stories from the Miami and Peoria tribes, recorded in the early 20th century when the language's last native speakers were alive.

A related project at Miami University concerns ethnobotany, which "pairs Miami-language plant names with elders' descriptions of traditional plant-gathering techniques."

== Phonology ==
The phonology of Miami–Illinois is typical of a Central Algonquian language, and fairly conservative with regard to Proto-Algonquian.

=== Consonants ===
Miami–Illinois distinguishes thirteen consonants:

	Labial	Alveolar	Palatal	Velar	Glottal
Stop	p ⟨p⟩	t ⟨t⟩	tʃ ⟨c⟩	k ⟨k⟩	ʔ ⟨'⟩
Fricative		s ⟨s⟩	ʃ ⟨š⟩		h ⟨h⟩
Nasal	m ⟨m⟩	n ⟨n⟩			
Approximant	w ⟨w⟩	l ⟨l⟩	j ⟨y⟩		

The intervocalic clusters permitted are -hC- and -NC-, where C is a non-glottal obstruent /p t tʃ k s ʃ/ and N is a homorganic nasal. -hC- clusters are described as "preaspirated". The 18th-century Illinois recorded in the French mission period also permitted intervocalic clusters -sp- and -sk-, but these have merged with -hp- and -hk- in modern Miami. In addition, many consonants and clusters can be followed by a tautosyllabic /w/.

Obstruents are voiced after nasals. Preaspirated sibilants /hs/ and /hš/ frequently assimilate to geminate /sː/ and /ʃː/, respectively, especially after front and word-initial vowels.

==== Alternations between /s/ and /ʃ/ ====
There are a small number of words in the Miami–Illinois language that alternate between /s/ and /ʃ/ in their pronunciations, with /ʃ/ occurring in the place of expected /s/ and vice versa. Both of these alternations seem to occur more commonly before the vowel /i/. One example is apeehsia ~ apeehšia, both meaning 'fawn' (Proto-Algonquian */apeˑhs-/).

==== Wea interdental ====
In the Wea dialect of Miami, the sibilant /s/ was frequently replaced with the interdental fricative [θ ~ ð]. In the Wea Primer (1837), this consonant – written as ⟨f⟩ – is only found in the place of preaspirated /hs/; by the time of Gatschet's documentation (1895–1902), it appears to have replaced all instances of /s/. This segment bears no historical relation to the Proto-Algonquian consonant commonly represented as */θ/.

=== Vowels ===
Miami–Illinois has four short vowels, /i e a o/ and four long vowels, /iː eː aː oː/. There is significant allophonic variation in vowel quality. /a/ is usually phonetic [a], but may be pronounced as [ʌ] by some speakers. /e/ occupies the non-high front range [æ ~ ɛ ~ e]. /i/ occupies the high front space [ɪ~i]. /o/ occupies the non-low back range [o~ʊ~u].

=== Suprasegmental processes ===
In this article, strong vowels are marked with bold type where relevant, whereas accented vowels carry an acute accent (e.g. ⟨á⟩).

==== Strong and weak vowels ====
Miami–Illinois prosody is in part determined by the "strong syllable rule", which marks the syllables of an underlying phonological word in an iambic pattern: beginning from the left, odd-numbered short syllables are "weak", while even-numbered syllables are "strong". A syllable with a long vowel is always strong, even at the beginning of a word, and resets the meter for all subsequent syllables. Thus a short vowel that immediately follows a long vowel must always be weak, and words beginning with a long vowel are trochaic: eehsipana 'raccoon'. The strong syllable rule is necessary to explain the processes of vowel deletion and devoicing.

===== Vowel deletion, devoicing, and reduction =====
Initial short (i.e. weak) vowels are frequently deleted in modern Miami, hence the optional initial vowel of (ah)cikwi 'stump', (a)hseema 'tobacco', (is/ih)pesiwa 'he is tall'. Initial vowel deletion appears to take preaspiration (-h-) with it before stops, but not before fricatives, which remain distinct from their simple counterparts (perhaps because of the assimilation of /hs/ and /hš/ to /sː/ and /ʃː/). By contrast, initial long vowels are never deleted: aahteeki 'it is extinguished'. This helps to identify long vowels in texts that mark them irregularly or not at all.

Weak vowels followed by a preaspirated consonant are devoiced: alakahkwi 'his palate' is pronounced [a.la.kḁ.hkwi]. Since short vowels that follow a long vowel are always weak, these will always undergo devoicing before a preaspirate: mataatihswi 'ten' is pronounced [ma.taː.ti̥.hswi]. Voiceless vowels, like vowel length and preaspiration, are transcribed irregularly in the Miami–Illinois literature; the French missionary sources usually indicate voiceless vowels, but later Anglo-American sources often ignore them, producing illusory consonant clusters foreign to Miami–Illinois phonology.

In the Peoria of Oklahoma resident Nancy Stand, recorded briefly in the 1930s by Charles Voegelin, many vowels appear to be reduced to a schwa /ə/. The contextual rules behind vowel reduction are unclear, and since no other Miami–Illinois text indicates any similar process, it appears to be a case of English influence.

==== Accent ====
The process of accentuation (heightened syllable prominence) is independent of the strong syllable rule: weak syllables can be accented, and whereas the strong syllable rule applies from left to right, accentuation applies from right to left. The rules of accentuation are as follows:

1. A syllable with a voiceless vowel can never take an accent, so bisyllabic words with a short first vowel followed by a preaspirate are always accented on the second syllable: ahkí 'field', mahkwá 'bear'. This proves that accent is determined after the syllable-strength processes described above.
2. If a word has a long vowel in the preantepenultimate syllable, the accent is placed on the subsequent syllable (the penultimate), if not devoiced: eehsípana 'raccoon', ahpwaakánali 'pipe (obviative)'. This rule is highly unusual, and in its specifics may be unique to Miami–Illinois. Costa (2003) describes it as "vowel retraction", since it pulls the accent one syllable back from its expected place under rule (3).
3. Otherwise, the accent is placed on every other syllable starting from the end of the world, beginning with the penultimate: illíniiwíta 'he is a man', waapíkináahkwa 'whooping crane'. Because of rule (1), the accent cannot land on voiceless vowels, and appears simply to ignore them for metrical purposes. Thus wáapihkwa 'louse' and awíilihsa 'his hair' are accented on the antepenultimate syllables as if the latter were penultimate.

== Grammar ==
Like all Algonquian languages, the grammar of Miami–Illinois is highly agglutinative, with particularly complex inflection on the verb. Other characteristically Algonquian features are a distinction between animate and inanimate gender on both nouns and verbs and a syntactic category of obviation. First-person forms distinguish clusivity (whether or not the addressee "you" is included in "we").

=== Nouns ===
Miami–Illinois noun inflection distinguishes two genders (animate vs. inanimate), two numbers (singular vs. plural), and four cases (proximate, obviative, locative, and vocative). Gender is marked only in the proximate case. The endings of the noun, with common allomorphs, are detailed in the table below.

Miami–Illinois noun endings
	Proximate		Obviative	Locative	Vocative
	Animate	Inanimate	Obviative	Locative	Vocative
Singular	-a	-i	-ali -ooli -iili	-enki -inki -onki -yonki	-e
Plural	-aki -ooki -iiki	-a -ia	-ahi -oohi -iihi	-enki -inki -onki -yonki	-enka

==== Proximate case and gender ====
The proximate case is the basic citation form of the noun. It is used to mark either the agent or patient of a verb in sentences with only one expressed noun phrase. Its singular forms regularly end in -a for animate nouns and -i for inanimate nouns. This transparent representation of gender on the noun sets Miami–Illinois apart from many other Algonquian languages, where deletion of word-final vowels has obscured gender marking. Gender is usually predictable from nature, but some nouns that would be expected to be inanimate are in fact marked as animate: misihkwa 'hail', apikana 'bead'. Many of these unexpectedly animate nouns have a special significance in traditional Miami–Illinois culture, and the gender assignment for some can be traced back to Proto-Algonquian. A handful of nouns can take either animate or inanimate gender. Categories with unpredictable internal gender assignments include body parts (kiloonkwa 'your cheek' but kihkiwani 'your nose') and names for plants.

The regular animate proximate plural suffix is -aki. Some nouns ending in -Cwa in the singular end in -ooki (deleting the final /w/) in the plural, along with or to the exclusion of regular -waki: mahkwa 'bear' becomes mahkooki 'bears', but eelikwa 'ant' can become either eelikooki or eelikwaki. A handful of nouns, including all nouns ending in -mina 'berry', pluralise with -iiki: ahsapiiki 'nets', kaayominiiki 'gooseberries'.

The inanimate proximate plural suffix is -a, homophonous with the animate singular; since plural form takes the same gender as its corresponding singular, the number of a gender-ambivalent noun can occasionally be ambiguous. Some inanimate nouns with a -k- in the final syllable are suffixed with -ia instead: ciimwiki becomes ciimwikia 'sleds'. Historically, the latter descends from verb participles rather than original nouns.

==== Obviative ====
The obviative singular ends in -ali. -ooli, or -iili; the obviative plural ends in -ahi, -oohi, or -iihi. The allomorphy here is determined in the same way as the proximate plural; if a noun takes -ooki or -iiki, it will take the corresponding forms with -oo- or -ii- in the obviative forms.

The obviative case is used for the less salient of two nominal arguments in a sentence, which is not necessarily either the subject or object. Explicit role markers are affixed to the verb instead, matching the subject of the verb with the proximate or obviative noun as necessary. Since most sentences only have a single nominal argument - always a proximate - the obviative is a marked case, unlike the absolutive. As in all Algonquian languages, the choice of which arguments to mark as proximate and which to mark as obviative is determined by complex discourse considerations.

==== Locative and vocative cases ====
The locative case marks a noun as characterizing the place at, on, or in which an action occurs. The precise type of position, which is disambiguated by different prepositions in English, is in Miami–Illinois simply assumed from context: ahkwaanteeminki 'at the door', aciyonki 'on the hill', ahkihkonki 'in the bucket'. Locative marking is mutually exclusive with gender and number marking, so the gender and number of a locative noun can also only be understood by context: wiikiaaminki can mean both 'in the house' and 'in the houses'. The regular form of the locative suffix is -enki, with the following common allomorphs: -inki when the suffix falls on a weak vowel (as in wiikiaam-i 'house'), -onki for stems ending in /Cw/, and -yonki for most stems ending in /Vw/. Both of the latter two allomorphs delete a final /w/. These rules do not predict all locative case forms, however.

Nouns, particles, and intransitive animate verbs can all take the locative. The last is a common way of forming place names: iihkipisinki 'it is straight' ~ iihkipisinonki 'the place where it (the river) is straight; Peru, Indiana'.

The locative case can be extended with the ablative suffix -onci, 'from', and the allative -iši, 'to, towards'. In locatives derived from full nouns and intransitive animate verbs, these suffixes must follow the locative suffix (e.g. minooteen-ink-onci 'from town'), but most particles can take them without the locative (alik-onci 'from over there').

The vocative case indicates the person or thing being addressed. It is formed regularly with the suffix -e in the singular and -enka in the plural.

==== Diminutive ====
There are several different patterns that form diminutive nouns in Miami–Illinois. Costa describes the formation of diminutives as "extremely complex - much more irregular than that seen in its closest Algonquian relatives". The most common diminutive suffix is -ns ~ -nehs ~ -nihs, which is followed by the case ending.

==== Possession ====
Personal possession is marked by prefixation. Nouns are either "dependent" or "nondependent", usually based on whether they are inalienably possessed or not. Dependent nouns must co-occur with a possessive prefix or with an indefinite possessor suffix, but require no possessee suffix, while non-dependent nouns can occur without a possessive prefix but often must take the possessee suffix -em- when possessed.

The primary allomorphs of the first, second, and third possessive prefixes are ni-, ki-, and a- respectively. The number of the possessor (as well as clusivity of the first person) is marked by a suffix. A representative, but by no means comprehensive, paradigm is illustrated below with the inanimate stem -iik- 'house'.

Possessive affixes
Possessor			Singular ('house')	Plural ('houses')	Locative ('in ... house / houses')
Singular	1 ('my')		niiki	niika	niikinki
Singular	2 ('your')		kiiki	kiika	kiikinki
Singular	3 ('his, her')		awiiki	awiika	awiikinki
Plural	1 ('our')	Exclusive	niikinaani	niikinaana	niikinaanki
Plural	1 ('our')	Inclusive	kiikinaani	kiikinaana	kiikinaanki
Plural	2 ('your')		kiikawaawi ~ kiikawe	kiikawa	kiikawaanki
Plural	3 ('their')		awiikawaawi ~ awiikawe	awiikawa	awiikawaanki
Indefinite ('someone's')			awiikime	awiikima	awiikamaanki

=== Pronouns ===
Since Miami–Illinois is a robustly pro-drop language, independent personal pronouns are used far less frequently than in English. Pronouns do not distinguish gender or case; instead, there are distinct forms to isolate a topic (e.g. "by myself") and to make a verb reflexive. The personal pronouns are listed below.

Independent personal pronouns
Person			Plain	"Alone"	Reflexive
Singular	1 ('I', 'me')		niila	niilaahka	niiyawi
Singular	2 ('you')		kiila	kiilaahka	kiiyawi
Singular	3 ('he, him, she, her, it')		awiila	awiilaahka	awiiyawi
Plural	1 ('we')	Exclusive	niiloona	niiloonaahka	niiyoonaani
Plural	1 ('we')	Inclusive	kiiloona	(unattested)	kiiyoonaani
Plural	2 ('you')		kiilwa	(unattested)	kiiyoowe
Plural	3 ('they')		awiilwa	(unattested)	awiiyoowe

The other pronouns are aweena 'who', keetwi 'what', aweeya 'somebody', and moohci aweeya 'nobody'. All conjugate for number and obviation: aweena and keetwi take -ii- suffixes, while aweeya and moohci aweeya are regular.
