= Peoria people =

Native American tribe in Oklahoma

Peoria Peewaalia
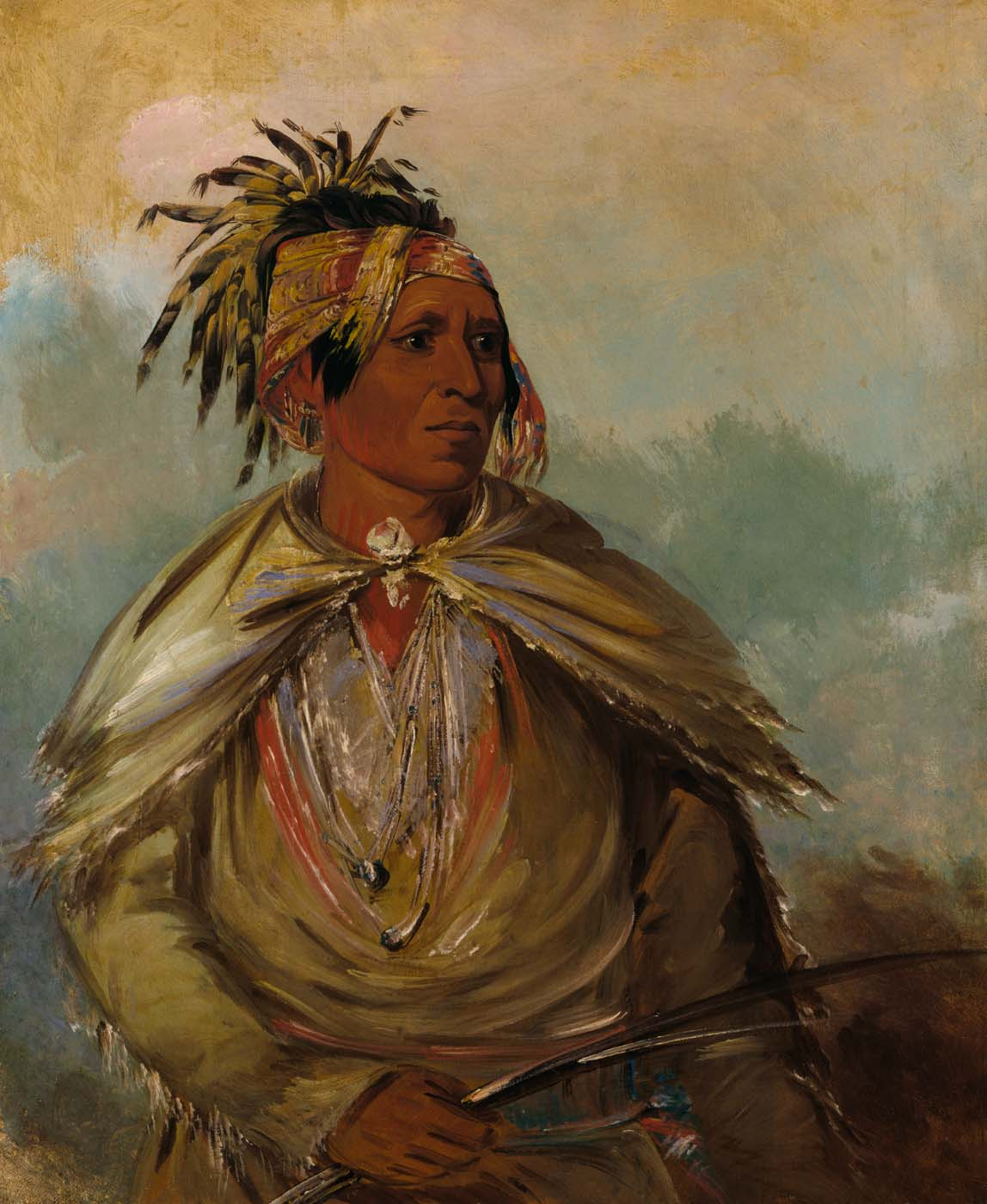
- Pah-mee-ców-ee-tah, Man Who Tracks, a Chief by George Catlin

Total population
- 3,713 (2011)

Regions with significant populations
- United States (Oklahoma, formerly Illinois)

Languages
- English, formerly Miami–Illinois

Religion
- Christianity (Roman Catholicism), Indigenous religions

Related ethnic groups
- Kaskaskia, Piankeshaw, and Wea

The Peoria (Miami–Illinois: Peewaalia) are a Native American people. They are enrolled in the federally recognized Peoria Tribe of Indians of Oklahoma headquartered in Miami, Oklahoma.

The Peoria people are the remnants of the nations that constituted the Illinois Confederation. The Peoria Tribe was located east of the Mississippi River and north of the Ohio River. In the colonial period, they traded with French colonists in that territory.

After 1763, when the British took over those lands following victory in the Seven Years' War, the Peoria were moved west across the Mississippi. In 1867 their descendants moved to Indian Territory with remnants of related tribes and were assigned land in present-day Ottawa County, Oklahoma. The land which they were assigned belonged to the Quapaw, who were made to cede this land for the Peoria and Miami.

== Language and name ==
The Peoria speak a dialect of the Miami–Illinois language, a Central Algonquian language in which these two dialects are mutually intelligible.

The name Peoria, also Peouaroua, derives from their autonym, or name for themselves in the Illinois language, peewaareewa (modern pronunciation peewaalia). Originally it meant, "Comes carrying a pack on his back." No native speakers of the Peoria language survive. Revitalization efforts for the Peoria Language were initiated in August 2022 by a 10-week online course offered by the tribe. Along with the Miami language, a smaller number of historic citizens of the Peoria tribe of Oklahoma once spoke related Algonquian languages of Cahokia, Moingwea, and Tamaroa.

== Government ==
Map of Peoria Tribe of Indians of Oklahoma's tribal jurisdictional area (OTSA) and nearby jurisdiction areas.

The Peoria Tribe of Indians of Oklahoma is headquartered in Miami, Oklahoma. Their tribal jurisdictional area is in Ottawa County, in the northeast corner of the state. Of the 3,713 enrolled tribal citizens, some 777 live within the state of Oklahoma.

As of 2025, the current administration is:

- Chief: Rosanna Dobbs
- Second Chief: Paul J. Attocknie Jr.
- Treasurer: Jason Dollarhide
- Secretary: Isabella Clifford
- First Councilman: Nick Hargrove
- Second Councilman: Kara D. North
- Third Councilman: Scott Myers

The Peoria issue their own tribal vehicle tags and operate their own housing authority.

== Economic development ==
The tribe owns one casino and the Peoria Ridge Golf Course. The estimated annual economic impact of the tribe in the area is $60 million. Tribal businesses, the Peoria Gaming Center, Buffalo Run Casino and Hotel, and Joe's Outback are all located in Miami, Oklahoma, their tribal lands.

== History ==
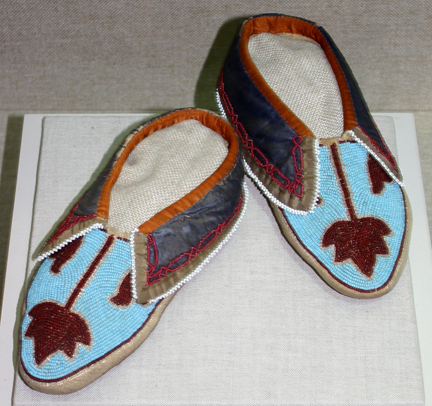
Peoria moccasins, ca. 1860, collection of Oklahoma History Center

The Peoria are Algonquian-speaking people. Their ancestors traditionally lived in what are now the state jurisdictions of Illinois, Ohio, Michigan, and Missouri. The Peoria are related to, and partially descended from, the Cahokia people (not to be confused with the builders and inhabitants of Cahokia).

The Peoria were one of the many Illinois tribes encountered by early French explorers, Father Jacques Marquette and Louis Jolliet. French Jesuit missionaries converted tribal citizens to Roman Catholicism. Father Jacques Gravier, superior of the Illinois mission, compiled the most extensive bilingual dictionary of Kaskaskia Illinois and corresponding French terms, nearly 600 pages and 20,000 entries.

After 1763 France ceded its Illinois Country and other territories east of the Mississippi River to the British, who had defeated them in the Seven Years' War. Like many of the French colonists in villages in this area, the Peoria migrated southwest into Missouri Territory. For instance, Ste. Genevieve and St. Louis were founded in that era by French colonists from east of the river who did not want to live under British Protestant rule.

In 1818, after the United States (US) had taken over former British territory east of the Mississippi following their gaining independence, they pressed the Peoria to sign the Treaty of Edwardsville, which provided for the cession of Peoria lands in Illinois to the US. The US pressed for Indian Removal from areas desired by European-American settlers, who kept pushing west, and President Andrew Jackson signed the act of that name in 1830. By the 1832 Treaty of Lewisville, the Peoria ceded Missouri lands in exchange for land in Kansas near the Osage River, which was then part of Indian Territory.

The tribe suffered from the introduction of European and African infectious diseases and intertribal wars in new areas of resource competition. In 1849, remnant members of the Kaskaskia, Peoria, Piankeshaw, and Wea tribes formed a confederacy under the Peoria name. The confederation included the last members and descendants of the Cahokia, Moingwena, Michigamea and Tamaroa tribes, who had assimilated with the Peoria many year before. The Pepikokia also joined, having merged with the Wea and Piankashaw in the later part of the 18th century.

In 1851, an Indian agent reported that the Peoria and the Kaskaskia, along with their allies, had intermarried among themselves and among white people to such an extent that they had practically lost their tribal identities. An 1854 treaty recognized this as a factual union and classified these groups as the Confederated Peoria. The treaty also provided for opening the Peoria-Kaskaskia and the Wea-Piankashaw reserves in Kansas to settlement by non-Indians.

After the Civil War, most of the confederated tribe signed the 1867 Omnibus Treaty. By this means, the US federally government purchased land from the Quapaw tribe and relocated the majority of the Confederated Peoria tribe onto a 72,000 acres (290 km^{2}) reservation in Indian Territory, part of present-day Ottawa County, Oklahoma. (Note: In 1873, 55 citizens of the Confederated Peoria chose to become citizens of Kansas (and the US) in order to remain on their own land in that state.) Congress enacted a law to unite the Miami tribe, then also in Kansas, and assign them to lands with the Confederated Peoria.

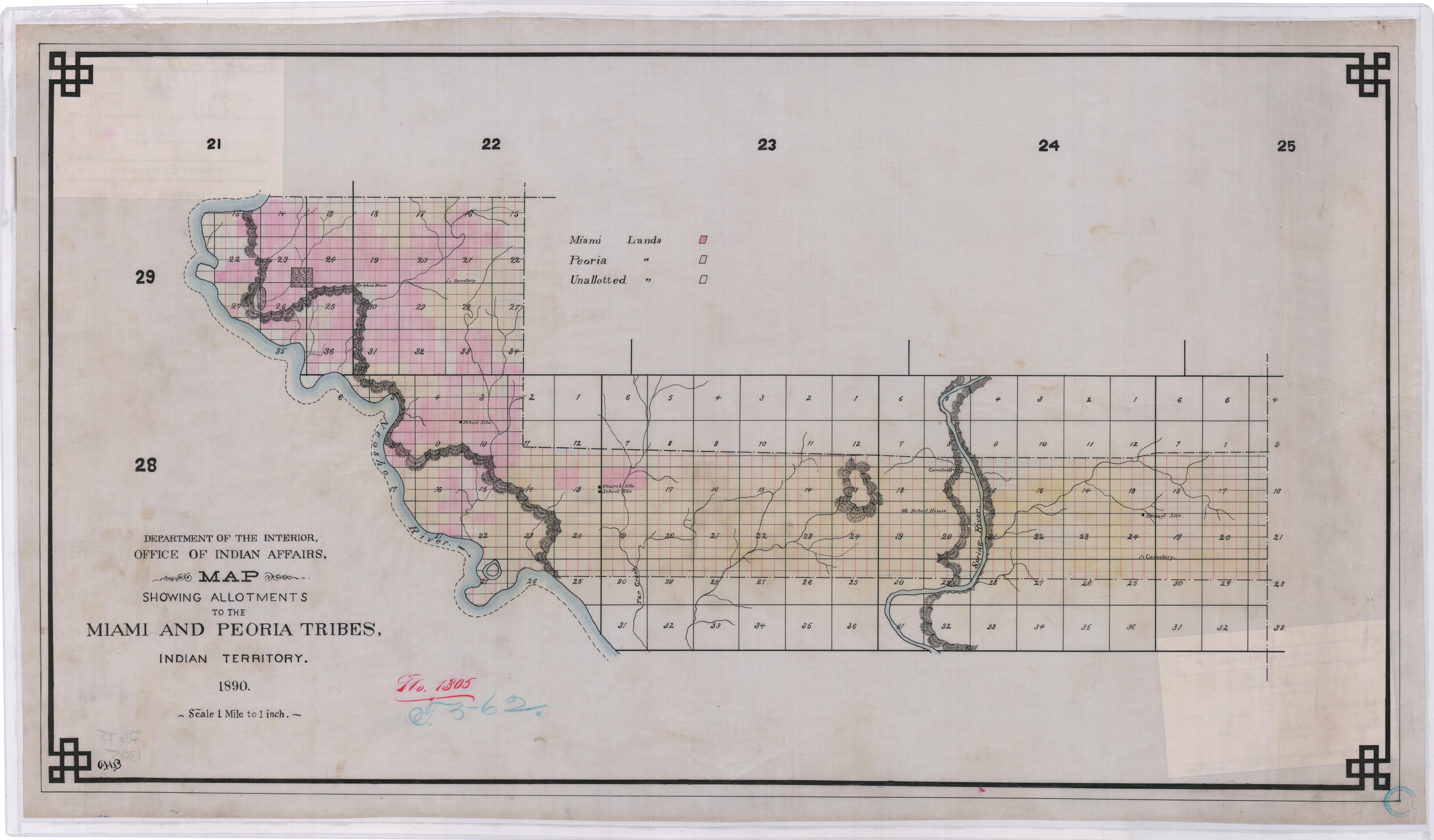
Map showing Allotments to the Miami and Peoria Indian Tribes, Indian Territory

In 1893, under the Dawes Act, the US broke up communal lands in Indian Territory to speed assimilation and make more land available for sale to non-Indians. Allotments were made to enrolled heads of households over the next few years, to extinguish Indian claims and enable the territories to be admitted as a state. In 1907, after admission of Oklahoma, any "surplus" land as determined by the US in former Confederated Peoria territory was transferred to Ottawa County, which could sell it.

Under the Dawes Act and Curtis Act of 1898, the US government created rolls of tribal citizens to make individual allotments of land to heads of families. They believed that encouraging subsistence agriculture was the way to forcibly assimilate the tribal citizens into European-American practices. It also enabled them to break up the communal culture and make land available for sale to whites. At the same time, they forced tribal governments to be dismantled before Oklahoma was admitted as a state. The Peoria lost much of their land in these transactions and suffered from the pressure to give up their culture. For decades, the Bureau of Indian Affairs appointed tribal chiefs, who previously had been selected by hereditary roles.

The federal government changed its approach during the President Franklin D. Roosevelt's administration, after realizing the adverse effects of those actions. In 1934 it passed a law to encourage federally recognized tribes (generally those who had been on reservations) to reorganize their governments, encouraging a constitutional, representative model similar to that of the US and states. Similarly, the Oklahoma Indian Welfare Act was passed in 1939. Under that, the Confederated Peoria reorganized and re-established its historical form of council government.

During the 1950s, the US government changed policies again, promoting Indian termination to end its special relationship with tribes that it believed were ready to be independent. It terminated the Peoria tribal government, which lost federal recognition in 1959. Tribal citizens objected and began the process to regain federal recognition, because it provided important education and welfare benefits. They regained federal recognition in 1978. The Miami tribe was never 'terminated'.

Descendants of the Piankeshaw, Kaskaskia, and Wea, who were all part of the Illinois Confederacy, are also enrolled in the Peoria Tribe of Indians of Oklahoma.

== Namesakes ==
- The city of Peoria, Illinois, and the surrounding Peoria County are named after the tribe that traditionally lived in that area.
- The Peoria War occurred in their historic territory but is named for the town, as the tribe had migrated to Missouri before this conflict occurred.
- Paola, Kansas, and Peoria, Oklahoma, are named directly for the tribe.
- Many other places named Peoria and some U.S. Navy ships were named after the town in Illinois.

== Notable Peoria people ==
- Charles Edwin Dagenett (1873–1941), founder and leader of the Society of American Indians
- Ruthe Blalock Jones (b. 1939), Shawnee/Peoria artist and educator
- Moscelyne Larkin (1925–2012), Peoria/Shawnee ballerina

== See also ==
- Sagamite, Native food
