= Jean Bernard Bossu =

French officer and explorer

Jean Bernard Bossu (1720–1792) was a captain in the French navy, adventurer and explorer. He travelled several times to New France, where he explored the regions along the Mississippi. He documented his experiences in letters and published them after his return to France.

== Life and work ==
Bossu was born on 29 September 1720 into a family of surgeons, nevertheless he pursued a career in the military. For his performance during the siege of Chateau-Queyrashe was promoted to a lieutenant. Later he became a captain in the French navy, which enabled him to travel to the New World.

In 1750 Bossu was a member of military reinforcements being send to New Orleans, the capital of the French colony Louisiana. Bossu's convoy left France on 1750-12-26 and traveled first to Cap-François in Saint-Domingue, where it arrived mid February. After a short stay the convoy left for New Orleans on 1751-3-8 finally arriving in early April. Soon after his arrival in New Orleans Bossu set out to explore the Mississippi River and neighbouring areas. First he traveled to the Natchez and later to the Quapaw, who made him a member of their tribe. Later he explored the lower parts of the Arkansas River and followed the Mississippi River into Illinois. in 1757 Bossu returned to France to report on the state of the French colony and was ordered back to New Orleans the same year. Louis Billouart the governor of Louisiana sent him from New Orleans to Fort Toulouse at the eastern border of the colony. In 1759 he was assigned to lead a convoy to Fort Tombecbe, where the Choctaw were living. He returned to New Orleans the same year and little is known what he did until early January in 1763 when he returned to France. Back in France he had to spend six weeks in prison for having criticized Louis Billouart for assigning the command of the convoy to Fort Toulouse to less experienced officer.

In 1770 Bossu embarked on his third and last voyage to the New World. He visited places in Louisiana again, which however by then was not a French colony anymore. In particular he paid a visit to the Quapaw, who had bestowed a tribe membership on him years ago.

Upon his return to France the same year, Bossu decided to settle in Burgundy. First he lived for a while in Auxerre and later for some time with a nephew in Aisey-sur-Seine, finally he died in 1792 in Montbard.

During his first two travels in the New World Bossu wrote many letters with detailed accounts of his experiences. Back in France he published a compilation of those letters in 1768. He also wrote an account of his third voyage, which he published as well. Bossu was keen observer making the accounts of his travels an important source for historians and ethnologists on New Orleans, the French colony and the Indian tribes in Mississippi region during the 18th century.

== Works ==
=== Original publications ===
- Nouveaux Voyages aux Indes Occidentales (1768)
- Nouveaux voyage dans l’Amérique septentrionale. (1777)

=== Later editions and translations ===
- Philippe Jacquin (ed.): Nouveaux Voyages en Louisiane 1751–1768. Aubier Montaigne, Paris, 1994.
- Seymour Feiler: Jean Bernard Bossu’s Travels in the Interior of North America, 1751–1762. University of Oklahoma Press, 1962
- Samuel Dickinson: New Travels in North America by Jean-Bernard Bossu, 1770–1771. Northwestern State University, 1982.
