= Illinois Confederation =

Group of 12–13 Native American tribes

- Illiniwek
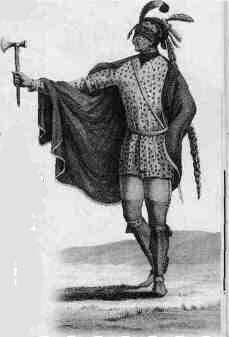
- Engraving from drawing by General Georges-Henri-Victor Collot (1796)
- Successor: Peoria Tribe of Indians of Oklahoma
- Formation: 5
- Type: Tribal alliance
- Location: United States
- Origins: Mississippi River Valley
- Members: Kaskaskia; Cahokia; Peoria; Tamaroa; Moingwena; Michigamea; Chepoussa; Chinkoa; Coiracoentanon; Espeminkia; Maroa; Tapouara
- Official language: Miami–Illinois language
- Main organ: Great Chief and lower peace chiefs and war chiefs

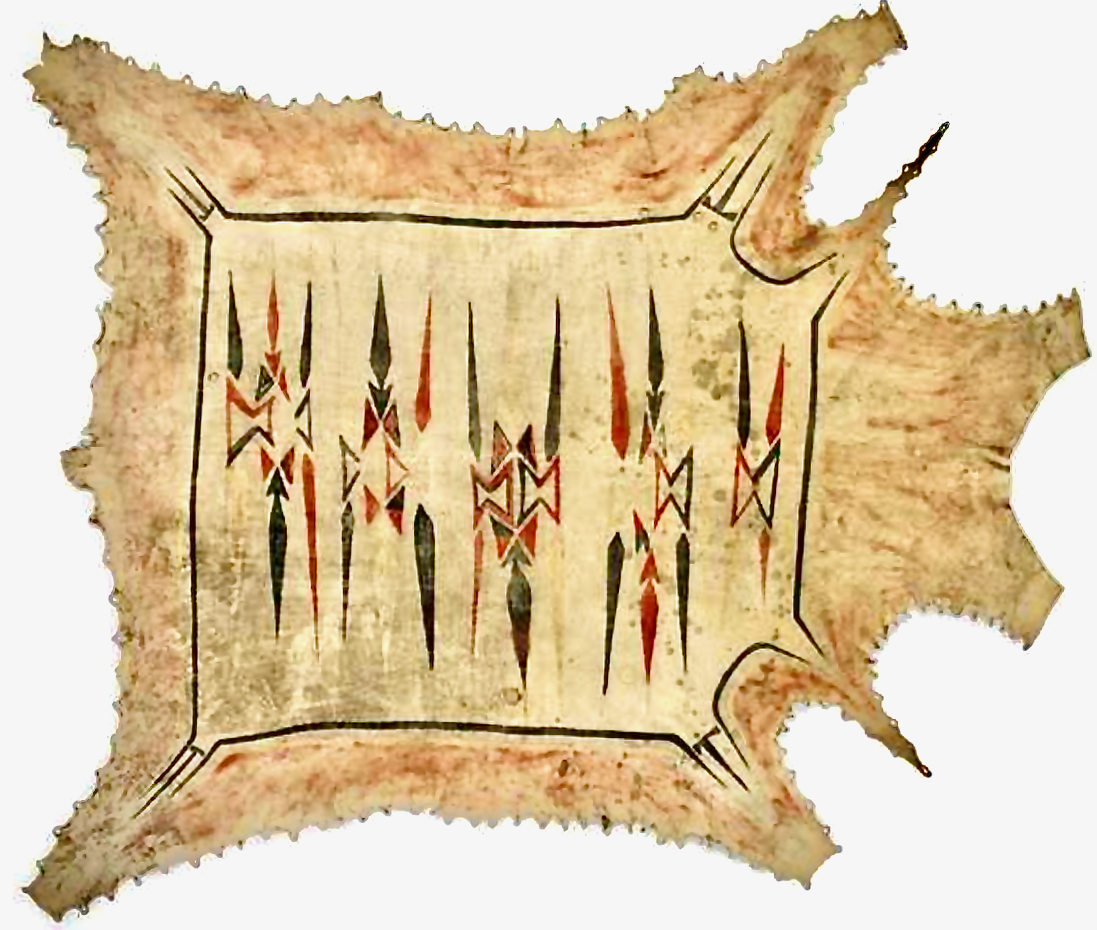
Painted hide with geometric motifs, attributed to the Illinois Confederacy by the French, pre-1800. Collections of the Musée du quai Branly.

The Illinois Confederation, also referred to as the Illiniwek or Illini, were a loosely organized group of 12 or 13 tribes who lived in the Mississippi River Valley. Eventually, member tribes occupied an area reaching from Lake Michigan to Iowa, Illinois, Missouri, and Arkansas. The five main tribes were the Cahokia, Kaskaskia, Mitchigamea, Peoria, and Tamaroa. Other related tribes included the Maroa (which may have been the same as the Tamaroa), Tapourao, Coiracoentanon, Espeminka, Moingwena, Chinkoa, and Chepoussa. By 1700, only the Cahokia, Kaskaskia, Michigamea, Peoria, and Tamaroa remained.

The spelling "Illinois" was derived from the transliteration by French explorers of iliniwe into the orthography of their own language. The Illinois are estimated to have numbered approximately 10,500 individuals at the time of intensive European contact in the late seventeenth century—a figure that would decline, within a century, to fewer than 500. This population decrease was largely consequent war and disease brought about by the arrival of French colonists and the westward pressure of the Iroquois Confederacy. In 1832, the last of the Illinois homelands were ceded, and survivors were removed to Kansas. An 1854 treaty acknowledged the practical merger of surviving groups and classified them as the Confederated Peoria. The remnants of these tribal groups are now known as the federally recognized Peoria Tribe of Indians and reside in present-day Oklahoma.

== Name ==
French missionaries who documented their interactions with the tribes noted that the people referred to themselves as the Inoka. The meaning of this word is unknown. Jacques Marquette, a French Jesuit missionary, claimed that Illinois was derived from Illini in their Algonquian language, meaning "the men." When the French encountered the Ojibwa, who occupied neighboring areas around the eastern Great Lakes, their pronunciation for this concept sounded to the French like ilinwe, the singular form of ilinwek. The French explorers who first heard it recorded it in various transliterated forms, such as "liniouek," "Aliniouek," "Iliniouek," and "Abimiouec."

== History ==
=== Formation ===
The Illinois Confederation comprised twelve separate tribes who shared a common language and culture: the Kaskaskia, Cahokia, Peoria, Tamaroa, Moingwena, Michigamea, Chepoussa, Chinkoa, Coiracoentanon, Espeminkia, Maroa, and Tapouara. (Note: Other scholars, such as Scott Berthelette, identify 13 distinct confederated Illinois tribes that shared the Algonquian language.) Of these twelve, only the Kaskaskia, Cahokia, Peoria, Tamaroa, and Michigamea survive as distinct tribes; others were lost to disease and warfare. Although the number of Illinois was significantly reduced by colonization, many of their descendants are today part of the Peoria Tribe of Miami, Oklahoma, contingents of the merged Confederated Peoria Tribe.

Although specific dates are unknown, the Illinois Confederation had at one time been one large nation without tribal subdivisions, divided into smaller groups only when its population proved too large to sustain effective hunting and agricultural activity. The constituent divisions of the Illinois composed a single nation, united by kinship, language, ceremony, and commerce, stretching from what is now Iowa to present-day Arkansas. Over time, the surviving tribes continued to merge: the Tamaroa joined the Kaskaskia, the Cahokia joined the Peoria, and a portion of the Michigamea merged with the Kaskaskia while the remainder merged with the Quapaw.

=== Geographic dispersal ===
The Illinois Confederation occupied one of the most consequential landscapes in colonial North America: the region where the Mississippi, Missouri, and Ohio Rivers converged—a zone French imperial strategists came to call the Pays des Illinois (Illinois Country). This was not merely a geographic convenience; it was a fulcrum. Whoever commanded the Illinois Country commanded the corridor linking French Louisiana to New France's Great Lakes heartland, and the Illini understood the leverage this position conferred.

Historian Pekka Hämäläinen describes the Illini country as stretching from the middle Mississippi Valley to the Ohio Valley and the lower end of Lake Michigan—terrain the French regarded as the exposed soft underbelly of their North American empire precisely because its security depended entirely on indigenous goodwill. By the late seventeenth century, however, the region remained primarily an aboriginal place; only a handful of French priests, explorers, and fur traders inhabited it, and few of these individuals lived there year-round.

For centuries, the Chicago region was home to a succession of Native nations whose histories overlapped and intertwined. The Illinois Confederation first dominated the area, followed by Miami groups and, by the eighteenth century, Potawatomi communities who established villages along the region's rivers and marshlands. These nations engaged in trade with French newcomers, formed kin networks with Métis families, and navigated the shifting politics of British and American expansion. A series of early nineteenth-century treaties forced the cession of their lands, but Native peoples did not vanish; Indigenous families remained in and around Chicago, and by the mid-twentieth century the city had become a major center of urban Indian life, shaped by federal relocation programs and the creation of institutions such as the American Indian Center.

=== Interactions with Europeans and Indigenous competition ===
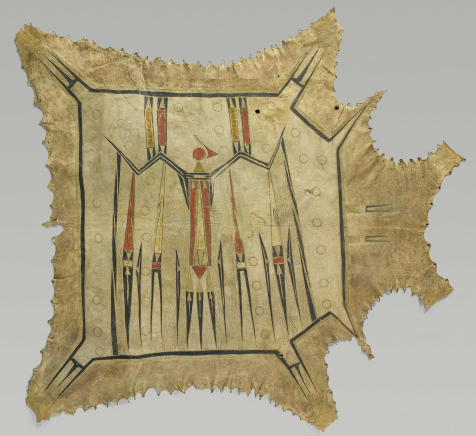
This Painted Skin represents the Thunderbird, before 1800.

When the French first encountered the Illiniwek at its demographic apex during the late seventeenth century, the Confederation numbered approximately ten thousand individuals—a population that placed it on rough parity with the whole of New France. They encompassed a region stretching from Lake Michigan west to the heart of Iowa and as far south as Arkansas. Its constituent peoples included the Kaskaskia, Peoria, Tamaroa, Cahokia, Michigamea, and Moingwena, among others, with neighboring groups such as the Quapaws and Chepoussas drawn periodically into its orbit. In the early 1670s, French explorers reported encountering a major Kaskaskia village at the Grand Village of the Illinois in the Illinois River Valley near present‑day Utica, Illinois, a Peoria village at the mouth of the Des Moines River (near the later site of Keokuk, Iowa), and the Michigamea living in what is now northeastern Arkansas. This village was the largest and best-known among the Illinois tribes. In 1675, the French established a Catholic mission—the Mission of the Immaculate Conception of the Blessed Virgin—and a fur-trading post near the village. The population increased to about 6,000 people in approximately 460 houses. Before long, however, Eurasian infectious diseases and the ongoing Beaver Wars brought high mortality to the Illiniwek, causing their population to plummet over the coming decades.

Early French explorers, including Louis Jolliet, Jacques Marquette, and René-Robert Cavelier, Sieur de La Salle, produced accounts that documented the first European contact with the Illinois. (Note: One of the accounts from Marquette included a tale about how the Illinois tribesmen from among the Peoria had tried to dissuade him and the fur trader Louis Jolliet from making their way down the Mississippi River, warning them about "monsters" and an underwater "demon.") European colonization, values, and religion affected the tribes in numerous ways. Illinois leaders approached the missionaries and fur traders with prudence and ingenuity, keenly interested in the spiritual and material power they perceived in their French visitors—a dynamic that would shape the terms of French-Illinois relations throughout the colonial period. Traders within the Illinois tribes (and the Sioux alike) jealously guarded their trade contacts with the French throughout the late 17th and early 18th centuries by driving other indigenous peoples—the Iowa and other Siouan-speaking groups—further west.

The Illinois Confederation's most acute crisis came during the height of Iroquois expansion in the late seventeenth century. Backed by English markets and firearms secured through the Covenant Chain alliance, Five Nations war parties swept into the southern Great Lakes and upper Mississippi Valley, targeting Illini villages for captives and pelts. The conceptual framework driving these raids was nirapakerima, an Illini principle meaning "I adopt him in place of the dead," which the Iroquois deployed using their own logic with devastating symmetry, since they were raiding to replenish communities hollowed by epidemic mortality—and both the Illini and Iroquois were doing so at the other's expense. The Iroquois, seeking to expand their territory and control the fur trade, forced the Kaskaskia and other Illinois out of their villages; they relocated to the south. Although the Illinois fought back against their primary enemy, the wars scattered and killed many of their members; eventually, they reclaimed some of their lands.

In 1680, the Illinois faced another crisis when Iroquois forces descended on Kaskaskia, the principal Illini stronghold. Illinois women, children, and old men evacuated the Grand Village, traveling six hours down the Illinois River, while the remaining warriors burned part of the town before joining them downstream; Iroquois forces destroyed Kaskaskia, dug up graves, and mutilated the dead. French observers recorded the seizure of hundreds of captives; Iroquois-side sources gave figures as high as 800 to 1,000, though observers associated with the Illinois placed the number of killed or captured closer to 700—a discrepancy due in part to the Iroquois practice of designating Miami, Potawatomi, and Sac captives as "Illinois" indiscriminately. The assault cleared the middle Mississippi Valley of sustained Illini presence for a period and created a "colonial vacuum" in the continental interior—a power absence that neither the French nor any other Indigenous confederacy could immediately fill.

Simultaneously, the native Illinois tribesmen were engaged on a second front. To their northwest, they conducted their own slave-raiding operations across an expanding zone, fighting a two-front war against both the Iroquois and the Sioux. Seeking passage through Sioux territory to the Lake Superior gun markets, Illinois leaders negotiated a pragmatic peace with the Sioux "in order to facilitate their coming to La Pointe"—a calculation that reveals the Confederation's participation in the broader colonial economy of captive labor as sophisticated rather than reactive.

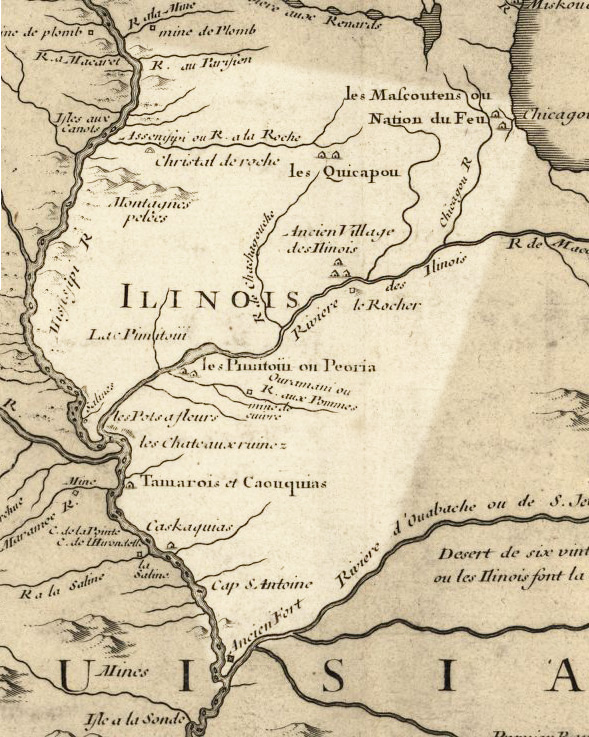
Illinois in 1718, approximate modern state area highlighted, from Carte de la Louisiane et du cours du Mississipi by Guillaume de L'Isle.

During the seventeenth century, the Illinois had taken control of the central Mississippi River valley by seizing important crossings and confluences; in command of these choke points, they built commercial and political alliances with neighboring nations, controlling the trade in slaves, furs, and European goods between the western Great Lakes, eastern Great Plains, and lower Mississippi valley. Bereft of the woods, lakes, and wetlands required for good beaver habitats in their prairie homeland, the Illinois had turned to bison products—hides, preserved meat, tallow, and decorated robes—as valuable export commodities for Algonquian and French markets, supplemented by enslaved captives taken from Siouan and Caddoan peoples to the south and west and funneled to Great Lakes markets in exchange for iron axes, copper kettles, and firearms.

In the early 1700s, the Illinois became involved in the conflict between the Meskwaki, also known as "Fox," and the French, known as the Fox Wars. In 1722, the Meskwaki attacked the Peoria for having killed the nephew of one of their chiefs, and forced them onto Starved Rock. The Peoria sent messengers asking for help from the French, but by the time they arrived, many Peoria warriors had been killed. The French and their Illini, Miami, Potawatomi, and Sac allies continued to battle the Meskwaki, but were unsuccessful until 1730, when they besieged a Fox village on the Sangamon River and conducted a decisive attack.

==== Displacement by the Three Fires Confederacy ====
The Potawatomi, Ottawa, and Chippewa—three closely related Algonquian peoples—who had formed a political and military alliance known as "The Three Fires", began encroaching upon Iliniwek territory in the 1740s, when a group of Potawatomi from the Detroit region, together with Ottawa and Chippewa companions, relocated to Chicago and the Illinois River valley. According to Auguste Chouteau, the confederacy had been formally constituted at Mackinaw prior to 1743 expressly for the removal of the Illini from northeastern Illinois; Governor Ninian Edwards later confirmed that the Ottawa claimed northern Illinois by right of conquest from the Peoria and subsequently permitted the broader confederation to occupy those lands. By 1747 the Potawatomi of the St. Joseph River had allied with the Miami, Sauk, Fox, and Menominee against the Iliniwek, and in 1751 the two principal Potawatomi villages—one on the St. Joseph and one on the Chicago River, augmented by Chippewa warriors—launched a direct attack upon the already weakened confederacy. Territorial ambition was the motive, since the Potawatomi and the Illini both wanted to possess the "fertile Illinois valley." The assassination of Pontiac—an Ottawa chief—by a member of the Peoria group in 1769 intensified confederate hostility further, and by the early 1770s Potawatomi villages had established themselves at the confluence of the Kankakee and Illinois rivers; Spanish officials at St. Louis, after questioning representatives of all three nations in 1769, concluded that the Three Fires appeared to be in "complete control" of both the St. Joseph and Illinois rivers.

==== A decreasing Illinois Confederacy ====
By the mid-1700s, the twelve or thirteen tribes of the confederation had dwindled to five: the Cahokia, Kaskaskia, Michigamea, Peoria, and Tamaroa. European diseases drastically reduced the numbers of the Illinois and the wars in which they were embroiled had arisen due to conflicts between tribes over resources and trade goods, or were initiated by European powers seeking to expand their territorial holdings by incentivizing inter-tribal warfare.

=== Dissolution ===
With the expansion of European contact, the Illinois were exposed to a variety of new diseases that caused high mortality. Through war and foreign disease, the Illinois population declined to a village of about 300 people by 1778. More granular reconstruction—drawn from missionary correspondence, colonial censuses, and military reports spanning over 160 years—identifies five interlocking causes of this decline, operating at different intensities across successive generations.

Warfare was both the most immediate and the most sustained of these factors. The Iroquois raids of 1656, ca. 1670–1672, and 1680 inflicted direct casualties, but the more lasting damage derived from the near-constant cycle of French-directed expeditions and retaliatory attacks that followed. For instance, the Illinois were used as auxiliary forces against the Fox, Chickasaw, and Natchez throughout the first half of the eighteenth century, drawing upon themselves the enmity of those groups in turn. Epidemic disease compounded these losses at irregular intervals; smallpox was present in the Illinois country as early as ca. 1701–1704, returned in 1714—killing between 200 and 300 at Kaskaskia alone—and struck again during the regional epidemics of 1732–1733 and 1756. Malaria, notably absent before British occupation of the region in 1765, reached epidemic proportions among both the French settler population and, in all probability, the Illinois themselves within two years of having transferred their sovereignty.

Two further causes operated on the birth rate rather than the death rate. The rapid conversion of the Illinois to Catholicism—one Jesuit alone baptized over 2,000 individuals within six years, and by 1730 the Illinois themselves declared universal Christianity, which brought with it enforced monogamy. Since Illinois men had previously maintained multiple wives, the reduction to a single spouse correspondingly reduced the number of women bearing Illinois children. Surplus women entered the French settler population through marriage: of 21 baptisms recorded at Kaskaskia between 1701 and 1713, eighteen were born of Indian mothers.

Contact with Europeans also meant the introduction of alcohol to native peoples. Thereto, excessive alcohol consumption, negligible before the establishment of Louisiana trade routes ca. 1700, became a recognized destabilizing force by mid-century. One priest known as Father Vivier, wrote in 1750 that brandy sold in violation of royal prohibition had "ruined this mission" and caused the majority of Illinois to abandon Catholicism. Then, the British occupation of Fort de Chartres in 1765 precipitated a political fragmentation that divided the Illinois between a pro-American Kaskaskia faction east of the Mississippi and a pro-French, pro-Spanish Peoria faction west of it—a dispersal that would not be formally resolved until both groups were assigned to the Kansas reservation in 1832.

Other than the Iroquois conflict, the Illinois also faced ongoing threats from European forces that stirred conflict with them and recruited them as allies. Pushed out by the Iroquois and Shawnee and facing increasing numbers of European settlers, the Illinois accepted a reservation in 1832 at the Big Muddy River south of Kaskaskia; within a few months, they ceded the rest of their territory and migrated to a reservation in eastern Kansas. The tale reported by John Dean Caton and Zebulon Pike, among others, that the Potawatomi massacred the last of the Illinois at Starved Rock (circa 1769) in retaliation for the murder of Pontiac, lacks any contemporary documentary corroboration; historian Emily Blasingham, along with several modern scholars, regarded it as folklore rather than historical record.

In 1854, the Illinois merged with the Wea and Piankashaw nations, renaming themselves the Confederated Peoria Tribe after ratifying a treaty with the U.S. government. In 1867, they resettled on a new reservation in northeast Oklahoma and were eventually joined by members of the Miami Tribe, who became an official part of their confederation in 1873. The United Peoria and Miami Tribe dissolved in the 1920s. The remaining members reorganized and were officially acknowledged by the U.S. government in 1978. The remaining descendants of the Illinois Confederation are today found within the Peoria Tribe in Ottawa County, Oklahoma.

== Culture ==
=== Language ===
Miami and Illinois are dialects of the same Algonquian language, spoken in Indiana and later Oklahoma. Though no native speakers of the language remain, language revival efforts are ongoing, and children from both the Miami and Peoria nations are learning to speak their ancestral language again. Miami–Illinois is a polysynthetic language with complex verb morphology and fairly free word order.

The Algonquian language family was spoken across Canada, New England, the Atlantic coastal region, the Great Lakes region, and into the Rocky Mountains. Although numerous Algonquian languages are known—including Cree, Ojibwa, Blackfoot, and Cheyenne—the term "Algonquin" is employed specifically to refer to the dialect of Ojibwa, which is distinct from the Miami-Illinois speech of the Illinois Confederation.

=== Gender ===
Like most Native American groups at first European contact, the men of the Illinois were mainly hunters and warriors, while women primarily held domestic and agricultural roles. Men performed most of the political leadership roles of the bands, though many women also held positions of leadership, including in ritual contexts. Amid a polygamous society, first wives held superiority in their families and leadership roles in the household; some women were shamans and priests, holding great power in the community. Illinois women oversaw agricultural production, fed their households, handled domestic chores, and cleaned and dressed pelts, preparing them for market or fashioning them into moccasins and clothing—labor that proved indispensable to the fur trade.

Women were sometimes granted participation in communal hunts but were denied the use of weapons. Outside of religion, women could achieve status through domestic activities and through harvest; growing bountiful produce, raising many children, and being a faithful wife were recognized as sources of elevated standing. Men received status through achievements in battle. Within polygamous marriages, wives who were unfaithful to the allotted group were punished severely, sometimes by mutilation. Despite the patriarchy and primitiveness such punishments imply, native peoples had a more liberal appreciation for women than Europeans in other matters. For instance, Europeans often conflated menstrual seclusion with the belief that women were somehow "unclean," but Illinois tribal traditions show otherwise. Illinois women, like their Yurok counterparts, used seclusion to seek visions and cultivate spiritual power—an experience closely parallel to the vision quests and pre‑war isolation practiced by men. For both sexes, the purpose of the seclusion was spiritual rather than hygienic in disposition.

==== Ikoneta ====
Alongside the two more pervasive gender roles of the time, a minority assumed a third gender role within their communities, called the ikoneta. According to tribal culture, they dressed in clothing similar to other women and were tattooed; they were also taught the language patterns specific to women. Ikoneta held many roles similar to other women in work and domestic life, and in times of war also held unique roles as spiritual leaders or as manitou. The ikoneta, as a group, were neither specially honored nor despised within their communities, but were generally accepted as part of life, at least until religious pressures from Catholic colonizers intervened.

French Catholic colonizers such as Pierre Deliette and Father Jacques Marquette, upon encountering ikoneta individuals, wrote about them using the term berdache—meaning "passive partner in sodomy, boy prostitute"—a term that has always been offensive to Indigenous peoples. While some ethnographers consider the ikoneta to have been transgender or bisexual, and Native American scholars indicate that in some cases and within certain tribes, a more accurate and appropriate descriptor is two-spirit.

=== Religion ===
People of all social roles were deeply religious, relying on spiritual guidance to inform every aspect of their lives. Hunters depended on spirits in catching wild animals, warriors asked the spirits for guidance before warfare, and shamans were regularly employed to address matters concerning physical and mental health. With the arrival of European missionaries in the late 1600s, Jesuit missions were established as a means to convert the Illinois to Christianity.

Many Illinois leaders were receptive to Catholic missionaries, whom they recognized as potentially potent purveyors of manet8a—other-than-human power—believing that the Christian God could aid them in war, protect their villages, and stem their depopulation. While a great portion of the tribes eventually converted, some tribal elders rejected Christianity and worked to retain their beliefs in the spirit world.

=== Traditions ===
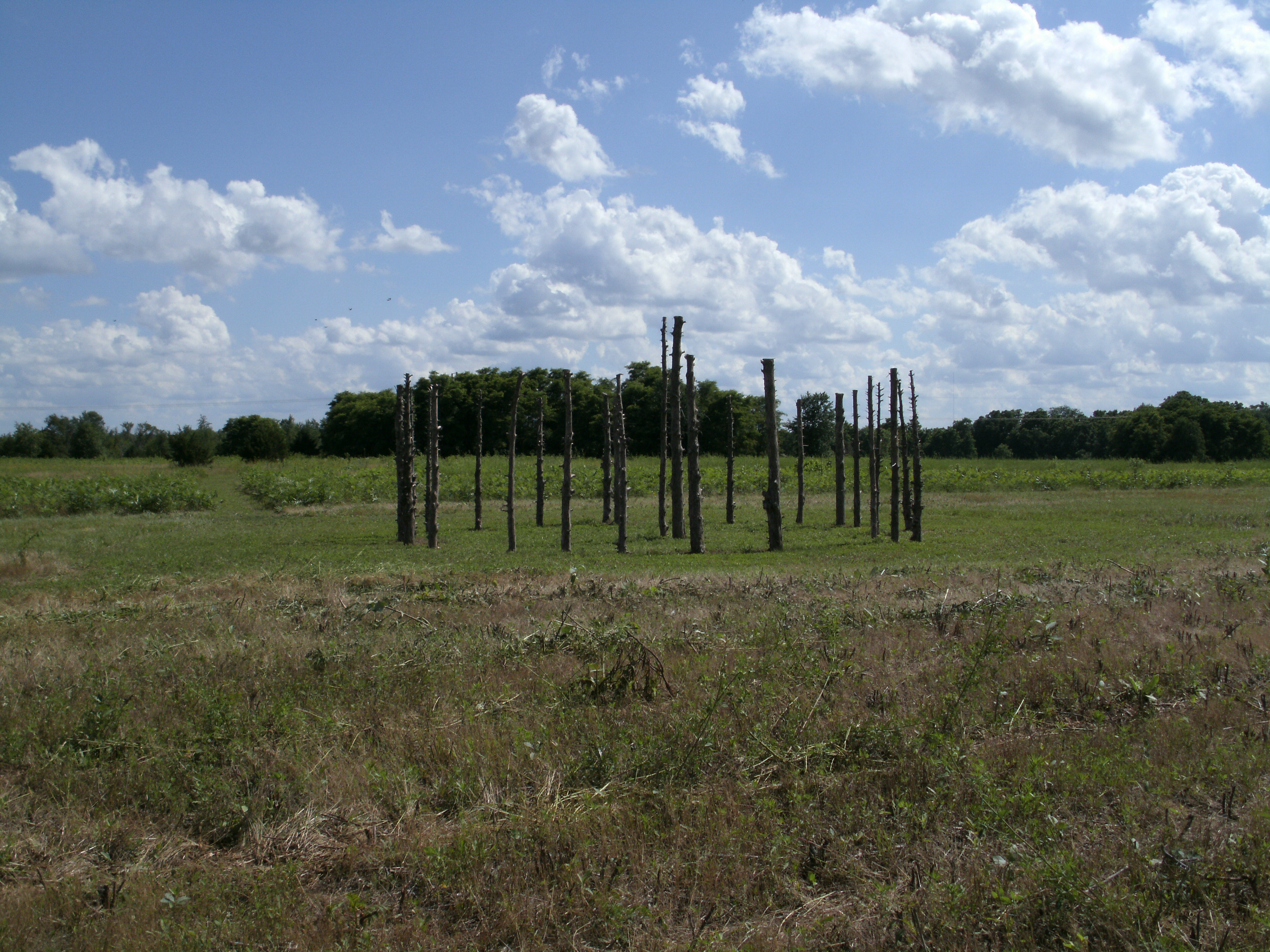
Illiniwek Village State Historic Site, Clark County, Missouri

The Illinois men and women practiced dream seeking, a ritual in which young people of about fifteen years of age would paint their face and isolate themselves to fast and pray, seeking to reveal a specific spirit guardian upon whom they would depend for the rest of their lives. Called manitou, this vision quest was an important part of becoming an adult.

Two burial procedures predominated Illinois tribal practices; these were the burial of intact bodies, and the burial of skeletons that had been placed on scaffolds prior to the ceremony. Only people of the same gender and age as the deceased could participate as part of the burial crew. For bodies that were intact, the cadavers were ceremonially dressed and placed in their grave along with funerary objects. A wooden cover was placed over the grave to prevent disturbance by animals or environmental factors.

== Society ==
=== Economy ===
The economy of the Illinois people was based on agriculture, hunting, and fishing. They depended heavily on agriculture, and generally located their villages near rivers where the soil was most fertile. Maize was the primary crop, but the Illinois also planted beans, squash, pumpkins, and watermelons, and gathered wild foods in the forests. Maize was planted in late spring and harvested prematurely in July, at which point most was preserved for the coming winter. The second harvest collected ripened maize, eaten during warmer months. Fish were plentiful in the Illinois River, but the Illinois generally did not rely heavily on fishing for sustenance.

Hunters primarily sought bison, which were numerous in the northern Illinois prairies. Annual bison hunts often necessitated groups of up to 300 people; during such hunts, groups would surround the bison on foot, shoot arrows and spears, and force the animals toward the rest of the hunting party. Women butchered the bison and preserved the meat by drying and heating it.

At the time of European contact, the Illinois economy was largely self-sufficient. In the course of their yearly activities, the Illinois people produced virtually all the foodstuffs and material products needed to maintain their way of life. The Illinois also participated in an extensive trading network: in exchange for hides, furs, and enslaved persons obtained from tribes to their south and west, they traded with Great Lakes tribes and French traders for guns and other European goods. As time passed, traders and missionaries began to settle among the Illinois and their formerly self-sufficient economy became increasingly dependent upon their French allies. The Illinois seasonally lived in wigwams and longhouses, depending on the weather and resources available to them. Like most other tribes, they lived in villages with dwellings occupied by a number of different families.

=== Warfare ===
In the beginning of February, war chiefs of each tribe organized raids against enemies—who included the Pawnee and the Quapaw, and later the five tribes of the Iroquois Confederacy. Prior to each battle, twenty warriors were invited by the war chief to a feast, in which the men would pray to their manitou for qualities such as speed and endurance. For campaigns involving larger numbers of enemies, war parties involving both men and women were organized.

To the Illinois, the capture of prisoners was preferred over death, though some prisoners were eventually killed or forced into slavery. The Illinois preferred arrows and spears over guns, finding them superior in speed to firearms; the noise of guns was nonetheless sometimes employed against tribal nations that had never before encountered such weapons, as a means of intimidation before battle.

=== Government ===
Although specific dates are unknown, the Illinois Confederation had at one time been one large nation without tribal divisions, subdivided only when its population proved too large to sustain effective hunting and agricultural activity. Even after the split, all tribes maintained a strong sense of unity as one nation. The structures of authority centered on one paramount figure—the Great Chief—with subordinate chiefs leading each individual tribe. One such Great Chief noteworthy in European history is Mamantouensa, who traveled to France. Direct political leadership was maintained by peace chiefs, who organized communal hunting expeditions and communicated with leaders of other tribes.

While highly respected, peace chiefs did not wield the authority of village chiefs; their decisions were enforced through persuasion rather than force. War chiefs held the power to plan and lead raids on other tribes. These roles were not inherited, but could be achieved through demonstrated battle skill and the ability to convince other warriors that one's manitou could guide a successful raid. It was the war chief's role to compensate the families of those killed in battle through gifts, and to lead retaliatory raids. Primarily only men were allowed to be chiefs, though women sometimes held village-level leadership roles.

Though chiefs held political authority and were widely respected, the egalitarian character of Illinois society produced a more democratic environment in which important decisions affecting the community were made by tribal consensus. It was only through direct contact with French colonial officials that chiefs were influenced to wield greater power over their people; by the 1760s, the elevation of a new chief required approval by colonial authorities. Because a true confederation refers to distinct groups linked as one nation, the Illinois—sharing a common language and cultural framework throughout their tribes and governed by a single Grand Chief—are more accurately described as a segmented tribe than a confederation in the strict sense.

=== Settlements ===
There are conflicting reports as to the number of villages and populations of the Illinois, both among individual tribes and as a whole. When Europeans first documented the nation, the Illinois had villages along the Mississippi and Illinois Rivers and a population of about eight or nine thousand. However, another report counts only five villages and about two thousand people. The former figure is considered the more accurate representation; the Illinois are said to have numbered approximately 10,500 people at the time of European contact.

== See also ==
- Grand Village of the Illinois
- Nikinapi

== Bibliography ==
- Bennett, A. Milo (1920). "The Building of a State: The Story of Illinois". Journal of the Illinois State Historical Society. 13 (3): 324–354. JSTOR 40194478.
- Berthelette, Scott (2023). "The Crafty Contrivance of the Illinois: Indigenous Informants, French Manet8a, and the Myth of the Missouri River". American Indian Quarterly. 47 (3): 191–222. doi:10.1353/aiq.2023.a917903.
- Bilodeau, Christopher (2001). ""They Honor Our Lord among Themselves in Their Own Way": Colonial Christianity and the Illinois Indians". American Indian Quarterly. 25 (3): 352–377. doi:10.1353/aiq.2001.0045. JSTOR 1185857.
- Blasingham, Emily J. (1956a). "The Depopulation of the Illinois Indians, Part I". Ethnohistory. 3 (3): 193–224. doi:10.2307/480408.
- Blasingham, Emily J. (1956b). "The Depopulation of the Illinois Indians. Part 2, Concluded". Ethnohistory. 3 (4): 361–412. doi:10.2307/480464.
- Briggs, Winstanley (1990). "Le pays des Illinois". The William and Mary Quarterly. 47 (1): 30–56.
- Callender, Charles (1979). "Illinois". In Bruce G. Trigger (ed.). Handbook of North American Indians. Vol. 15. Washington, D.C.: Smithsonian Institution. ISBN 978-0-87474-195-7.
- Clark, Patricia Roberts (2009). Tribal Names of the Americas: Spelling Variants and Alternative Forms, Cross-Referenced. Jefferson, NC: McFarland. ISBN 978-0-7864-5169-2.
- Costa, David J. (2005). Wolfart, H.C. (ed.). "The St-Jérôme Dictionary of Miami-Illinois" (PDF). Papers of the 36th Algonquian Conference. Winnipeg: University of Manitoba. pp. 107–133. Archived from the original (PDF) on July 27, 2011.
- Delgado, Louis (2005). "Native Americans". Encyclopedia of Chicago. Chicago Historical Society; Newberry Library.
- Ellis, Richard N.; Steen, Charlie R. (1974). "An Indian Delegation in France, 1725". Journal of the Illinois State Historical Society. 67 (4): 385–405. JSTOR 40191318.
- Encyclopedia Britannica. "Algonquian Languages". Encyclopedia Britannica.
- Faye, Stanley (1942). "Illinois Indians on the Lower Mississippi, 1771–1782". Journal of the Illinois State Historical Society. 35 (1): 57–72.
- Ferguson, Gillum (2012). Illinois in the War of 1812. University of Illinois Press. ISBN 978-0-252-09455-2.
- Fixico, Donald Lee (1997). Rethinking American Indian History. Albuquerque: University of New Mexico Press. ISBN 0-8263-1818-5.
- Fowler, Loretta (2003). The Columbia Guide to American Indians of the Great Plains. New York: Columbia University Press. ISBN 0-231-11700-0.
- Hämäläinen, Pekka (2019). Lakota America: A New History of Indigenous Power. New Haven and London: Yale University Press. ISBN 978-0-30021-595-3.
- Hämäläinen, Pekka (2022). Indigenous Continent: The Epic Contest for North America. New York: Liveright Publishing. ISBN 978-1-63149-699-8.
- Hauser, R. (1990). "The Berdache and the Illinois Indian Tribe during the last half of the 17th century". Ethnohistory. 37 (1): 45–63. doi:10.2307/481936. JSTOR 481936.
- Illinois State Museum (2026). "The Illinois (Illiniwek)". Native American Peoples of Illinois. Illinois State Museum.
- Johnson, Judi (1981). The Illiniwek (PDF). Springfield: Illinois State Museum.
- Lee, Jacob F. (2019). Masters of the Middle Waters: Indian Nations and Colonial Ambitions Along the Mississippi. Cambridge, MA and London: The Belknap Press of Harvard University Press. ISBN 978-0-67423-977-7.
- Mazrim, Robert (2010). "A Brief Summary of French Domestic Site Archaeology in Illinois, 1730–1800". Illinois Archaeology: Journal of the Illinois Archaeological Survey. 22 (1). Illinois Archaeological Survey: 148–165.
- Olar, Jared L. (2023). "The Decline of the Illiniwek". Pekin Public Library.
- Parmenter, Jon (2014). "The Beaver Wars". In Christos G. Frentzos; Antonio S. Thompson (eds.). The Routledge Handbook of American Military and Diplomatic History: The Colonial Period to 1877. Routledge. pp. 33–41. ISBN 978-1-31781-334-7.
- Powers, Amy Godfrey (2016). "The Settlers' Empire: Colonialism and State Formation in America's Old Northwest". Journal of the Illinois State Historical Society. 109 (2): 208–209. doi:10.5406/jillistathistsoc.109.2.0208.
- Sweatman, Dennis (2010). "Comparing the Modern Native American Presence in Illinois with Other States of the Old Northwest Territory". Journal of the Illinois State Historical Society. 103 (3/4): 252–315. doi:10.2307/41201286. JSTOR 41201286.
- Temple, Wayne C. (1958). Indian Villages of the Illinois Country (PDF). Illinois State Museum Scientific Papers. Vol. 2. Springfield: Illinois State Museum. ISBN 0-89792-027-9.
- Thomas, Wesley; Jacobs, Sue-Ellen (1999). ""… And we are still here": From berdache to two-spirit people" (PDF). American Indian Culture and Research Journal. 23 (2): 91–107.
- U.S. Government (1854). "Ratified Indian Treaty 273: Kaskaskia, Peoria, Piankeshaw and Wea–Washington, DC, May 30, 1854". National Archives.
- Vries, Kylan Mattias de (2009). O'Brien, Jodi (ed.). "Berdache (Two-Spirit)". Encyclopedia of Gender and Society. Los Angeles: 64. ISBN 9781412909167.
- Walczynski, Mark (2007). "The Starved Rock Massacre of 1769: Fact or Fiction". Journal of the Illinois State Historical Society. 100 (3): 215–236. JSTOR 40204687.
- Walthall, John A. (1991). French Colonial Archaeology: The Illinois Country and the Western Great Lakes. Urbana and Chicago: University of Illinois Press. ISBN 978-0-25201-797-1.
- Wood, W. Raymond (2013). "Ethnohistory and Euro-American Contact in Missouri". Missouri Archaeologist. 74: 7–35.
