= Tamaroa people =

Native American ethnic group

The Tamaroa were a Native American people in the central Mississippi River valley of North America, and a member of the Illiniwek or Illinois Confederation of 12 or 13 tribes. The name "Tamaroa" is a derivative of the word tamarowa meaning "cut tail" in Illiniwek and relates to a totemic animal such as bear or wildcat. An Algonquian-speaking group, like the rest of the Illiniwek, they lived on both sides of the Mississippi River in the area of the confluence with the Illinois and Missouri Rivers. Tamaroan culture is presumed to be similar to that of the Kaskaskia, Peoria, and other Illinois tribes.

== History ==
An estimated 3000 Tamaroa lived along the Mississippi River, near the confluences with the Missouri and Illinois Rivers, but soon moved to a site near present-day Cahokia, Illinois. In 1682, their village, also called Tamaroa, had about 600 lodges. A Catholic mission was founded near Tamaroa in 1689, which attracted the Cahokia, another Illinois tribe, who settled among the Tamaroa. After they combined, the two tribes had only 90 dwellings, indicating a rapid decline of the Tamaroas.

The Tamaroas united with the Kaskaskia tribe in 1703 at the mouth of the Kaskaskia River, where the French had already established a community of the same name. The tribe was further reduced by its exposure to "...European diseases and liquor and by warfare with the Chickasaw and Shawnee." In 1803, the U. S. government recognized the surviving Tamaroas as members of the Kaskaskia tribe.

Possibly the most influential Tamaroa was Chief Jean Baptiste De Coigne (1750-1811). Born to a Tamaroan mother and named for his father, a French fur trader and interpreter, Jean Baptiste de Coigne (1720-1796), who returned to Montreal long before his own death. Young De Coigne became chief of the Tamoroas in 1767, when the alliance of several Illiniwek tribe dissolved after Chief Pontiac was murdered and the British succeeded the French and left a small garrison at Kaskaskia. De Coigne became more important as chief of a new alliance of the Kaskakia, Tamaroa and Chaokia tribes, which aligned with the patriots during the American Revolutionary War, allowing George Rogers Clark to capture the town of Kaskaskia in 1776. De Coigne traveled to Virginia, smoked a peace pipe with as well as corresponded with its governor (and future President) Thomas Jefferson. Marquis de Lafayete also praised De Coigne, but his friend had died by the time Lafayette returned to Edwardsville on his farewell tour in 1824. Under DeCoigne's leadership, the Kaskaskia and allies fought the Shawnee in 1800, the heavy casualties devastating both sides. De Coigne's son, Louis Jefferson De Coigne, succeeded his father in 1811.

Five leaders of the Tamaroa were among those who signed the Treaty of Edwardsville (1818), by which the various groups of the Illiniwek ceded about half of the present state of Illinois to the United States. Descendants of the Tamaroa later merged with other, larger tribes of the Illiniwek, such as the Peoria. As a consequence of the forced Indian removal in the 1830s, their descendants are to be found mostly in Oklahoma, as the Confederated Peoria Tribe.

The group later joined the Peoria tribe and moved to what would become the Kansas Territory. The consolidated Peoria were given land in Indian Territory. Thus, an unknown number of Tamaroa descendants were included in the Peoria reservation residents who were allotted land, beginning in 1889. The reservation was in present-day Ottawa County, Oklahoma.

== See also ==
- Peoria tribe
- Illinois Confederation
