= Kaskaskia =

Indigenous people of the Northeastern Woodlands of North America

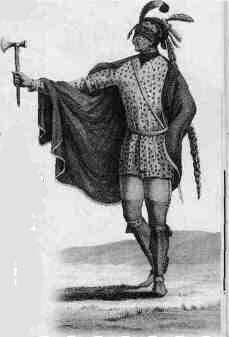
Illinois Indian of the Kaskaskia Tribe, engraving based on drawing by General Georges-Henri-Victor Collot, 1796

The Kaskaskia (Miami–Illinois: Kaaskaaskia) were a historical Indigenous people of the Northeastern Woodlands. They were one of about a dozen cognate tribes that made up the Illiniwek Confederation, also called the Illinois Confederation. Their longstanding homeland was in the Great Lakes region. Their first contact with Europeans reportedly occurred near present-day Green Bay, Wisconsin, in 1667 at a Jesuit mission station.

== Post-contact history ==
=== European explorers ===
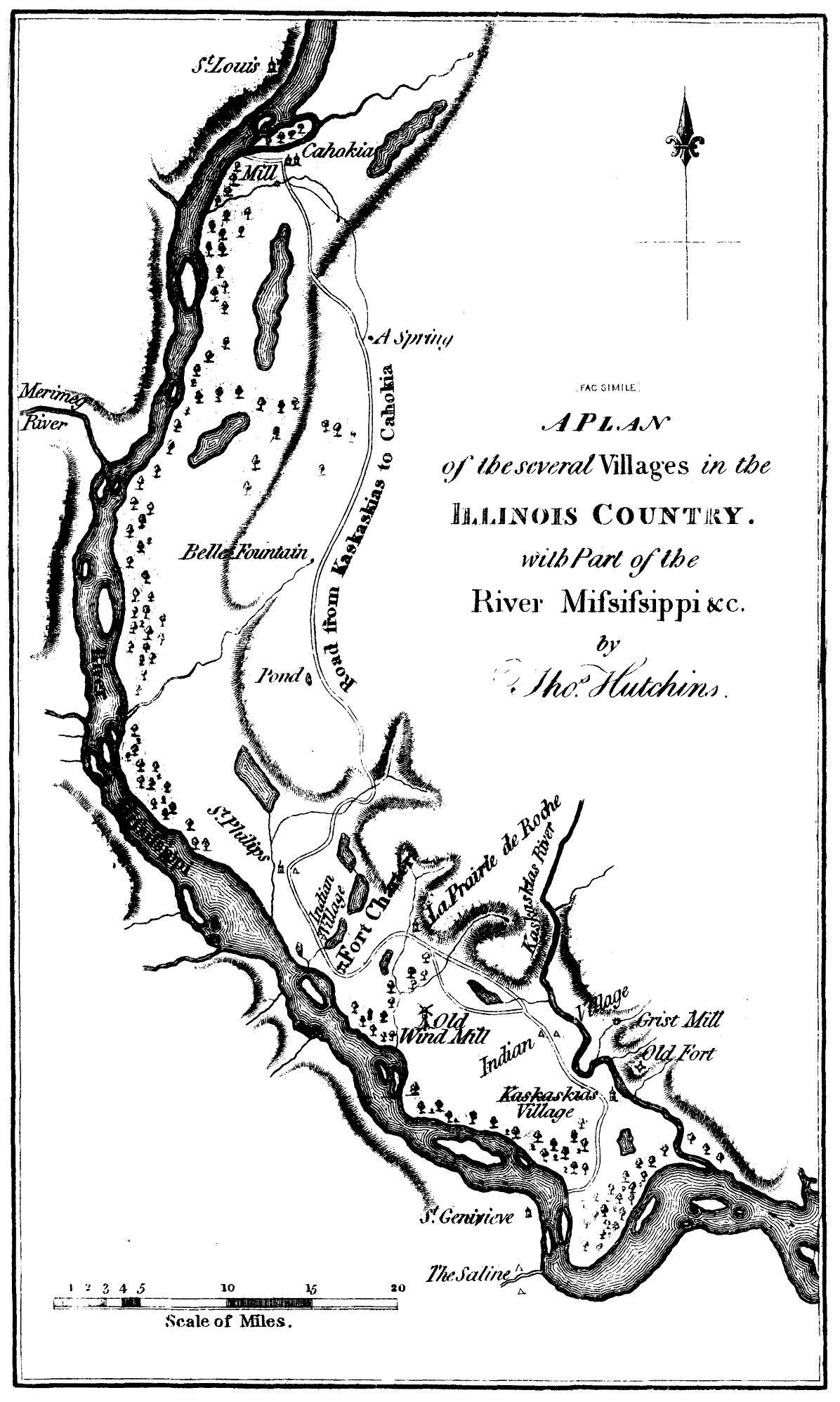
Map of the Several Villages in the Illinois Country with Part of the River Mississippi, by Thomas Hutchins, 1851, showing "Kaskaskias Village" near Fort Chartres

In 1673, Jesuit Father Jacques Marquette and French-Canadian explorer Louis Jolliet became the first Europeans known to have descended the Mississippi River. The record of their trip is the earliest, best record of contact between Europeans and the Illinois Indians. Marquette and Jolliet, with five other men, left the mission of St. Ignace at Michilimackinac in two bark canoes on May 17. To reach the Mississippi River, they travelled across Lake Michigan into Green Bay, up the Fox River and down the Wisconsin River. Descending the Mississippi, in June, they met the Peoria and Moingwena bands of Illinois at the Haas/Hagerman Site near the mouth of the Des Moines River in Clark County, northeastern Missouri. They met another Illinois band, the Michigamea, when they reached present-day Arkansas.

They began their return trip from the Michigamea village about July 17, following the Illinois River eastward to Lake Michigan rather than taking the more northern route along the Wisconsin River. Near modern Utica in LaSalle County, Illinois, across from Starved Rock, they met the Kaskaskia at the Grand Village of the Illinois (now a State Historic Site, also known as the Zimmerman site). The land controlled by the allied Illinois groups extended north from modern Arkansas, through Eastern Missouri and most of Illinois, and west into Iowa, where Des Moines was named after the Moingwena.

=== New France missions ===
In 1703, the French established a permanent mission, settlement and fort (Fort Kaskaskia State Historic Site) at Kaskaskia, Illinois, a part of their New France colonization of North America., which was part of the French Illinois Country, later made part of French Louisiana (New France).

French settlers moved in to farm and to exploit the lead mines on the Missouri side of the river. Kaskaskia became the capital of Upper Louisiana, and a larger Fort de Chartres was built in 1718, nearby North close to Prairie du Rocher. In the same year, the French imported African slaves from Saint-Domingue (Santo Domingo) to work in the lead mines. From its beginning, Kaskaskia was a French/Native American settlement, consisting of a few French men and numerous Kaskaskia and other Illinois Indians.

In 1707, the population of the community was estimated at 2,200, the majority of them Illinois Indians who lived somewhat apart. A visitor, writing of Kaskaskia about 1715, said that the village consisted of 400 Illinois men, "very good people", two Jesuit missionaries, and "about twenty French voyageurs who have settled there and married Indian women." Of 21 children whose birth and baptism was recorded in Kaskaskia before 1714, 18 mothers were Indian and 20 fathers were French. The offspring of these mixed marriages could become either French or Indian. Because Indian communities were larger and more complete, they tended to be reared with their mothers and their people and culture. One devout Roman Catholic full-blooded Indian woman disowned her half-breed son for living "among the savage nations". The settlement of Kaskaskia thus had a large population of mixed French and Indigenous ancestry, many of whom worked for fur companies based out of St. Louis, Missouri (a city created later, in 1764, by French traders and settlers who came from New Orleans).

=== French and Indian War ===
Male descendants of the French, Indians, and mixed bloods at Kaskaskia became the voyageurs and coureurs des bois who would explore and exploit the Missouri River country. The French wanted to trade with all the prairie tribes, and beyond with the Spanish colony in New Mexico; the Spanish were alarmed at their commercial reach. French goals stimulated the expedition of Claude Charles Du Tisne to establish trade relations with the Plains Indians in 1719. The fate of the Kaskaskia, and the rest of the Illiniwek/Illinois, was irrevocably tied up with that of France. Until their dissolution in France, French Jesuits built missions and ministered to the Kaskaskia. By 1763 and the end of the Seven Years' War in North America (called the French and Indian War in the United States), the Kaskaskia and other Illinois tribes were greatly in decline. Early French explorers had estimated their original population from 6,000 to more than 20,000. By the end of the war, their numbers were a fraction of that. Contemporary historians believe the greatest fatalities during this period were due to new infectious diseases, to which the Native Americans had no immunity.

== Decline ==
The causes of decline are many and varied. The Illinois made war with their French allies against the most formidable native nations: to the east, the Iroquois; to the northwest, the Sioux and the Meskwaki; to the south, the Quapaw, Chickasaw and Cherokee; to the west, the Osage Nation. Added to combat losses were the great losses due to epidemics of European diseases. In 1769, a Peoria warrior killed Pontiac, which brought the wrath of the Great Lakes tribes against the Kaskaskia and other Illinois tribes. (Some historians question this legendary retaliation; see the article on Pontiac.) The Ottawa, Sauk, Meskwaki, Miami, Kickapoo and Potawatomi devastated the Illiniwek and occupied their old tribal range along the Illinois River.

In 1766, the British arrived and established a small detachment from Fort de Chartres at Kaskaskia. From 1766 through 1772, this rotating detachment was around 25 men under a junior officer, detached from Fort de Chartres. In May 1772, when the British abandoned Fort de Chartres, the 18th (Royal Irish) Regiment of Foot, left a small detachment of four officers and 50 men at Kaskaskia as an effort to retain British control over the Illinois Country. Captain Hugh Lord, of the 18th Foot, was the last British commander in Illinois. The detachment of the 18th Foot was ordered to Detroit in May 1776 and never returned to Illinois. Lord's detachment was garrisoned in the former Jesuit compound at Kaskaskia. The post was called Fort Gage only after Fort de Chartres was abandoned in 1772.

On July 4, 1778, during the American Revolutionary War, George Rogers Clark captured the town and Fort Gage.

End April 1824, Gilbert du Motier, Marquis de Lafayette, French hero of the American Revolutionary War, visited Kaskaskia during his grand tour of the United States, just after having visited Saint Louis (Missouri) (Visit of the Marquis de Lafayette to the United States), as a salute to two towns which were part of the former French Louisiana which was acquired by the United States in 1803.

== Etymology ==
The name Kaskaskia derives from the old Miami–Illinois word for a katydid. Spelled phonetically, it is kaaskaaskia. This name later appeared in the modern Peoria and Miami dialects as kaahkaahkia. This is already seen in Gravier's early-18th century Illinois dictionary, where for the word "caskaskia", he gives "cigale. item nation Ilinoise, les Kaskaskias".

== Today ==
The descendants of the Kaskaskia, along with the Wea and Piankeshaw, are enrolled in the Peoria Tribe of Indians of Oklahoma, a federally recognized tribe in Oklahoma.

== Namesakes ==
The name and termKaskaski lives on in Illinois:

- The Kaskaskia River, whose headwaters are near Champaign in central Illinois, and whose mouth is near Ellis Grove, Illinois, is named for the native nation once settled throughout its estuarial plain.
- Kaskaskia College is located near Centralia, Illinois, in rural Clinton County.
- The city of DuQuoin, Illinois, carries the name of Jean Baptiste DuQuoin (sometimes DuQuoigne), a notable Kaskaskia chieftain of their later history.
- Kaskaskia, Illinois, was the first capital of Illinois.
- The Kaskaskia Baptist Association, located in Patoka, Illinois, uses their name.
- The USS Kaskaskia carries the name.

== See also ==
- Illinois confederation
- Jacques Gravier, author of the dictionary
- Pierre Menard, second governor of Illinois
