= Federalist No. 70 =

Federalist Paper by Alexander Hamilton

- Alexander Hamilton, author of Federalist No. 70
- Author: Alexander Hamilton
- Original title: The Executive Department Further Considered
- Language: English
- Publisher: The New York Packet
- Publication date: March 15, 1788
- Publication place: United States
- Media type: Newspaper
- Preceded by: Federalist No. 69
- Followed by: Federalist No. 71

Federalist No. 70, titled "The Executive Department Further Considered", is an essay written by Alexander Hamilton arguing that a unitary executive is consistent with a republican form of government. It was originally published on March 15, 1788, in The New York Packet under the pseudonym Publius as part of The Federalist Papers and as the fourth in Hamilton's series of eleven essays discussing executive power.

As part of the Federalists' effort to encourage the ratification of the Constitution, Hamilton wrote Federalist No. 70 to refute the argument that a unitary executive would be too similar to the British monarchy and to convince the states of the necessity of unity in the executive branch.

== Summary ==
Federalist No. 70 emphasizes the structure of the executive. Offering a counterpoint to the view that "a vigorous executive is inconsistent with the genius of republican government", Hamilton proclaims "Energy in the executive is a leading character in the definition of good government". Federalist No. 70 does not go into detail about the separation of powers.

== Historical background ==
In the founding era most state constitutions were hostile to a unitary executive, seeing it as too similar to the monarchic power recently overcome, and preferring weak executives.

During the Constitutional Convention, Edmund Randolph, who presented the Virginia Plan to the Convention in May 1787, was the most outspoken opponent of the unitary executive, arguing that it would be unpopular with the people and could easily become monarchical. Others, including Hamilton, argued that one strong leader would be more decisive and accountable. James Wilson, seconded by Charles Pinckney, proposed "a national executive to consist of a single person".

Although several delegates opposed the unitary executive, Wilson's proposal was approved by a vote of 7 to 3.

== Philosophical influences ==
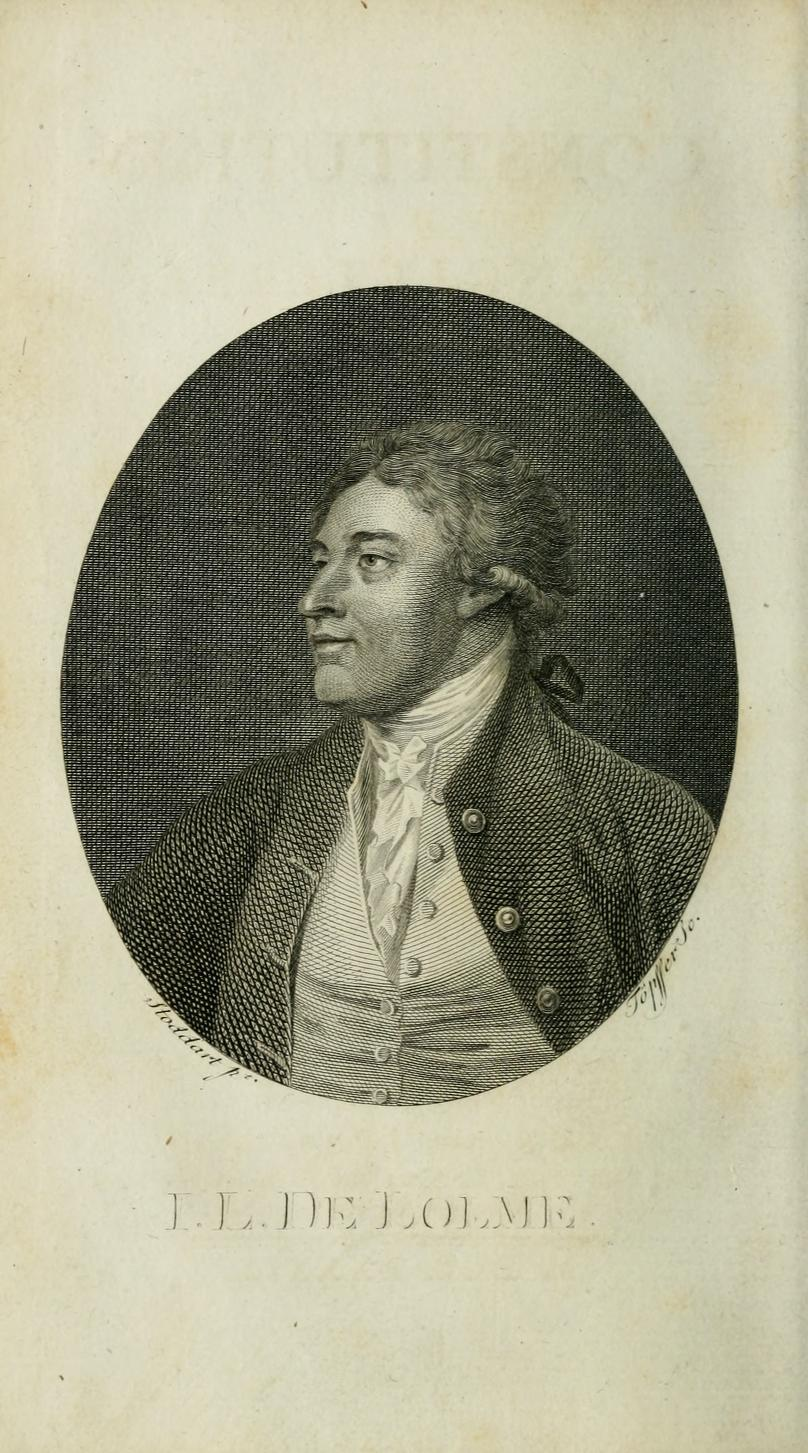
Jean-Louis de Lolme, quoted in Federalist No. 70 as saying, "the executive power is more easily confined when it is ONE".

In Federalist No. 70, Hamilton cites an influential but lesser-known writer Jean-Louis de Lolme to support his argument that a unitary executive will have the greatest accountability to the people.

Harvey Mansfield speculated that David Hume, John Locke and Montesquieu, although not cited by name on Federalist No. 70, may be counted among the "politicians and statesmen who are the most celebrated for the soundness of their principles and [...] have declared in favor of a single executive and a numerous legislature".

== Hamilton's argument for a unitary executive ==
Hamilton says a strong executive must have a single leader because "unity is conducive to energy...[d]ecision, activity, secrecy, and dispatch will generally characterize the proceedings of one man in a much more eminent degree than the proceedings of any greater number." Hamilton did not provide a specific definition for "executive power", but some historians and legal scholars say "unity" was given effect by the Vesting Clause. (Note: "The executive Power shall be vested in a President of the United States of America." Article II of the United States Constitution)

In other essays Hamilton discusses in more detail the three other ingredients of energy mentioned in Federalist No. 71: duration, an adequate provision for its support (salary) and competent powers.

=== Energy ===
Alexander Hamilton wrote Federalist No. 70 to defend the unitary structure of the executive from critics by arguing that unity was a necessary ingredient of energy. Energy in the executive, he said, is "the leading character in the definition of good government" because it is "essential to the protection of the community against foreign attacks...to the steady administration of the laws; to the protection of property... to the security of liberty against the enterprises and assaults of ambition, of faction, and of anarchy". He argued that "decision, activity, secrecy, dispatch" are weakened or diminished when power is shared by multiple leaders.

==== "Foreign attacks" ====
The core argument of Federalist No. 70 was that a unitary executive was a necessary ingredient for a quick, decisive executive to conduct war.

==== "Administration of laws" ====
Responding to modern debates about the nature of "executive power" Steven Calabresi and Saikrishna Prakash point to Hamilton's comment that "energy in the executive... is not less essential to the steady administration of laws", and his argument that an "artful cabal" forming in a plural executive would "enervate the whole system of administration".

=== Accountability ===
Hamilton, in response to opponents of the unitary executive, argues in Federalist No. 70 that a plural executive leads to a lack of accountability. Hamilton bolsters his argument by claiming that misconduct and disagreements among members of the council of Rome contributed to the Roman Empire's decline. He warns that America should be more afraid of reproducing the plural executive structure of Rome than of the "ambition of a single individual."

According to Hamilton, a unitary executive is best-suited to promoting accountability in government because it is easier to point blame at one person than to distinguish fault among members of a group. Because a unitary executive cannot "cloak" his failings by blaming council members, he has a strong incentive towards good behavior in office. Hamilton concludes the essay by reminding us that "the UNITY of the executive of this State was one of the best of the distinguishing features of our constitution."

=== Support ===
Hamiltonian support can be defined as a presidential salary, which insulates government officials from corruption by attracting capable, honest men to office. According to Hamilton, public service does not provide men with fame or glory, so ample pay is necessary to attract talented politicians. Hamilton further expands upon his arguments for executive support in his essay Federalist No. 73.

== Contemporaneous opposition to the unitary executive ==
=== The Anti-Federalist Papers and opposition to the Constitution ===
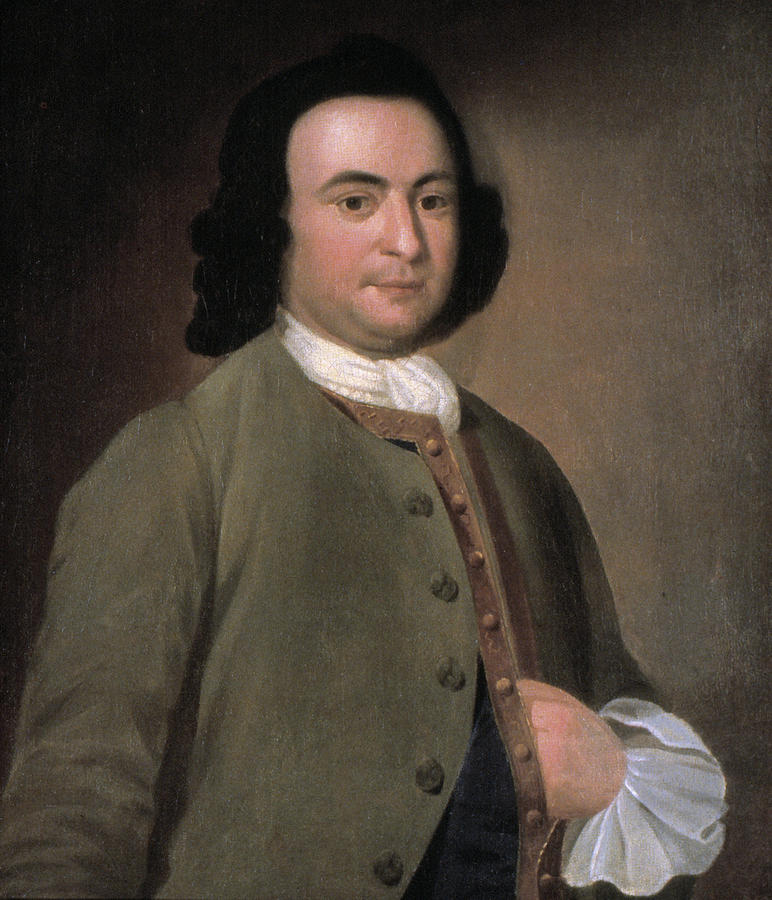
George Mason, considered one of the Founding Fathers, recommended a privy council for the executive branch.

While most of the Anti-Federalists' arguments did concern the presidency, some Anti-Federalist publications did directly contest Hamilton's position in Federalist 70 for unity in the executive branch.

In response to the exclusion of an executive council in the Constitution, Mason published his "Objections to the Constitution" on November 22, 1787, in the Virginia Journal. In this manuscript, originally written on the back of an early draft of the Constitution, Mason warned that the lack of a council would make for an unadvised president, who would act within the interests of friends, rather than the people at large:

The President of the United States has no Constitutional Council, a thing unknown in any safe and regular government. He will therefore be unsupported by proper information and advice, and will generally be directed by minions and favorites...

Richard Henry Lee, another prominent Anti-Federalist, exchanged letters with Mason, in which he too expressed concern about the unitary executive, supporting the constitutional addition of a privy council. In Anti-Federalist No. 74, titled "The President as a Military King," Philadelphiensis (likely, Benjamin Workman) wrote primarily against the president's military powers, but added that the lack of a constitutional executive council would add to the danger of a powerful presidency:

And to complete his uncontrolled sway, [the President] is neither restrained nor assisted by a privy council, which is a novelty in government. I challenge the politicians of the whole continent to find in any period of history a monarch more absolute. . . .

On December 18, 1787, after the Convention of Pennsylvania, which ultimately ratified the Constitution, the minority published its reasons for dissent to its constituents. In this address, written most likely by Samuel Bryan and signed by twenty-one members of the minority, the lack of an executive council is enumerated as the twelfth of fourteen reasons for dissent:

12. That the legislative, executive, and judicial powers be kept separate; and to this end that a constitutional council be appointed, to advise and assist the president, who shall be responsible for the advice they give, hereby the senators would be relieved from almost constant attendance; and also that the judges be made completely independent.

Though he was in England at the time of the Anti-Federalist Papers, Thomas Paine, whose pamphlet Common Sense served as motivation for independence from British rule during the American Revolution, also opposed the unitary executive. While this position was already evidenced from his role as Clerk to the Pennsylvania Assembly during the writing of Pennsylvania's 1776 Constitution, he clearly stated it in a letter to George Washington in 1796. In this letter, Paine argued for a plural executive on the grounds that a unitary executive would become head of a party and that a republic should not debase itself by obeying an individual.

== Applications and modern relevance ==
=== The war on terror ===
==== Federalist No. 70 as a justification for executive power ====
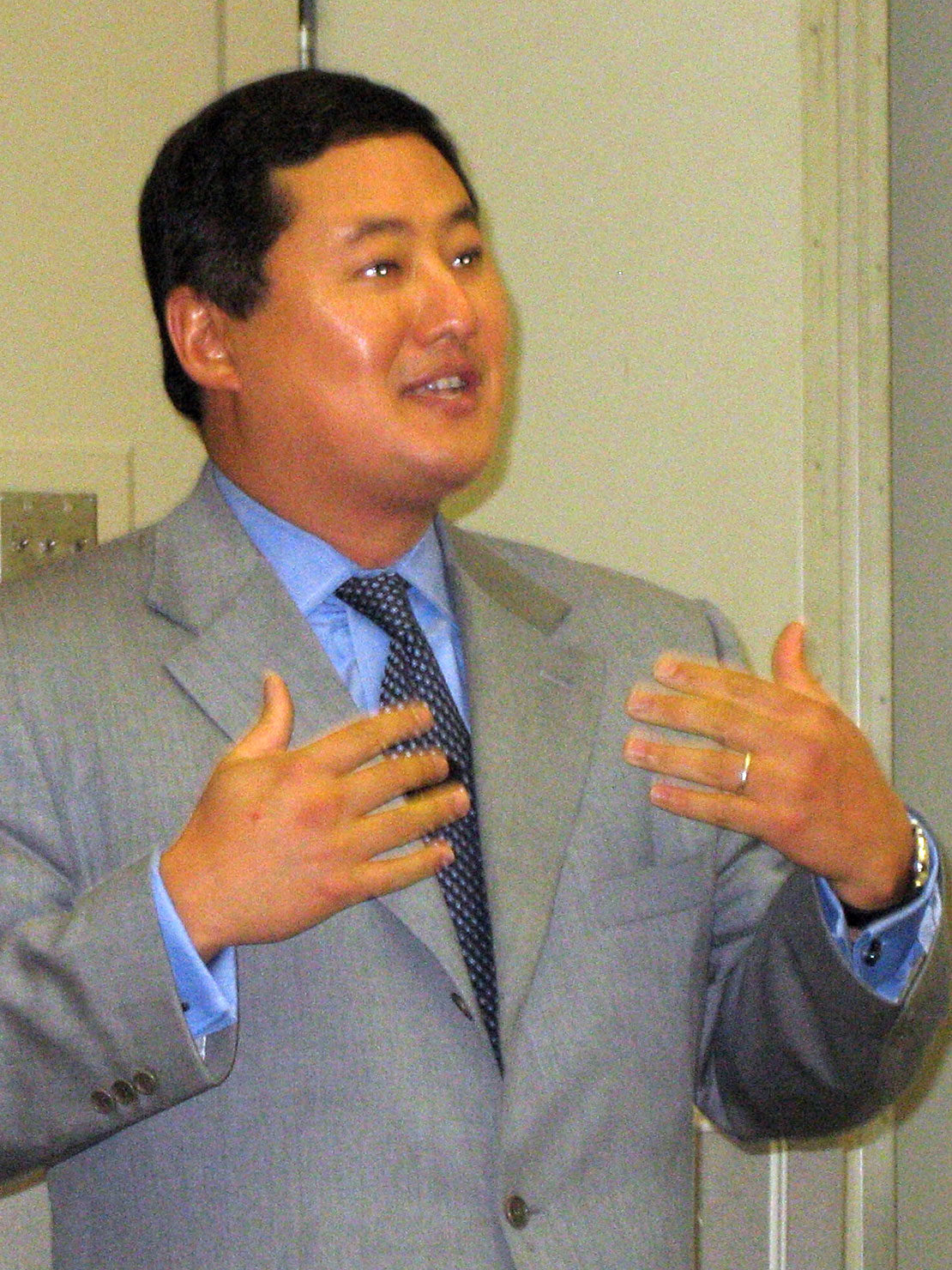
John Yoo, legal advisor to the George W. Bush administration, used Federalist No.70 to defend the President's foreign policy

As the Bush Administration's Deputy Assistant Attorney General, John Yoo argued that "centralization of authority in the President alone", meaning the Constitution's vesting of executive power in a single president by Article II of the United States Constitution, ensured a "unity in purpose [...] where a unitary executive can evaluate threats, consider policy choices, and mobilize military and diplomatic resources with a speed and energy that is far superior to any other branch."

Yoo has also cited Federalist No. 70 in his support of the President's right to unilaterally conduct operations against terrorists without congressional consent. He claims that this power applies to operations against both individuals and states.

President George W. Bush explicitly invoked the discourse of Federalist No. 70 in declaring that he was allowed to operate outside of the law when it conflicted with his prerogatives as the head of "the unitary executive branch." For example, when signing the 2005 Detainee Treatment Act, Bush applied Hamilton's unitary executive theory to claim the right to work outside the provisions of the Act when they conflicted with his responsibilities as Commander in Chief.

President Obama has also used signing statements to expand his executive power, specifically by issuing a 2011 statement on an omnibus year-end spending bill. It has been speculated that this statement was made to nullify provisions of the bill that limited Obama's ability to deal with prisoners at Guantanamo Bay, thus expanding Obama's executive power. This action has been explicitly compared to Bush's 2005 signing of the Detainee Treatment Act.

==== Controversy ====
Critics of the Bush Administration have argued that any executive, as envisioned by Alexander Hamilton in Federalist No. 70, must act within the limits imposed by other provisions of the United States Constitution and that the concept of the unitary executive does not allow the president to work outside laws passed by Congress, even when they conflict with national security interests. President Bush could have asked Congress to amend the Foreign Intelligence Surveillance Act or retroactively obtained warrants under the existing law. His decision to conduct warrantless electronic surveillance in secret was criticized by his own staff and Attorney General John Ashcroft. President Obama has been similarly criticized for operating outside the law, despite statements at the beginning of his presidency which showed a desire to limit the use of signing statements to expand executive power.

=== Judicial applications ===
==== Executive unity ====
Recently, Federalist No. 70 has become associated with unitary executive theory and has been invoked to support the claim that the president should have primary responsibility over the entire executive branch. This theory was particularly relevant to Justice Antonin Scalia's 1988 dissent in Morrison v. Olson, in which he argued that an investigation of the executive branch by independent counsel was unconstitutional because criminal prosecution was purely an executive power, held in its entirety by the president. Scalia also cited Federalist No. 70 in his decision on Printz v. United States. Printz v. United States concerned the constitutionality of the Brady Handgun Violence Prevention Act, a federal law that would have obligated state law enforcement officers to help enforce federal gun regulations. Scalia argued:

The Brady Act effectively transfers this responsibility to thousands of CLEOs [chief law enforcement officers] in the 50 States, who are left to implement the program without meaningful Presidential control (if indeed meaningful Presidential control is possible without the power to appoint and remove). The insistence of the Framers upon unity in the Federal Executive--to ensure both vigor and accountability--is well known. See The Federalist No. 70.

==== Executive power ====
Federalist No. 70 has been cited in several Supreme Court dissents as a justification for the expansion of executive power. For example, in his 1952 dissenting opinion in Youngstown Sheet & Tube Co. v. Sawyer, chief justice Fred M. Vinson wrote:

This comprehensive grant of the executive power to a single person was bestowed soon after the country had thrown the yoke of monarchy… Hamilton added: 'Energy in the Executive is a leading character in the definition of good government. It is essential to the protection of the community against foreign attacks; it is not less essential to the steady administration of the law, to the protection of property against those irregular and high-handed combinations which sometimes interrupt the ordinary course of justice...' It is thus apparent that the Presidency was deliberately fashioned as an office of power and independence. Of course, the Framers created no autocrat capable of arrogating any power unto himself at any time.

Vinson referenced Federalist No. 70's arguments about energy in the executive to argue that the president should be allowed to seize private property in a time of national crisis. In a more recent 2004 case, Hamdi v. Rumsfeld, Justice Clarence Thomas used Federalist No. 70 to make the case that the president should have the power to suspend Habeas Corpus for American citizens in order to fight the war on terror.

In both cases, the majority of the court was not persuaded that the expansions in executive power in question were justified.

==== Presidential accountability ====
Federalist No. 70 has also been cited by the Supreme Court as an authority on the importance of presidential accountability. In its 1997 opinion in Clinton v. Jones, the court weighed whether or not a sitting president could delay addressing civil litigation until the end of his or her term. The court cited Federalist No. 70, stating that the president must be held accountable for his or her actions, and thus cannot be granted immunity from civil litigation. However, in the 2010 case of Free Enterprise Fund v. Public Company Accounting Oversight Board, the court cited the need for executive accountability as a basis to expand presidential power. Writing the majority opinion, Chief Justice John Roberts stated:

The Constitution that makes the President accountable to the people for executing the laws also gives him the power to do so. That power includes, as a general matter, the authority to remove those who assist him in carrying out his duties. Without such power, the President could not be held fully accountable for discharging his own responsibilities; the buck would stop somewhere else. Such diffusion of authority "would greatly diminish the intended and necessary responsibility of the chief magistrate himself." The Federalist No. 70, at 478.

Roberts argued that the act in question deprived the president of the ability to hold members of an independent board accountable, thus freeing him or her of responsibility over the independent board's actions and depriving the people of their ability to hold the president accountable.

== See also ==
- The Farmer Refuted
