= Hungary–Romania relations =

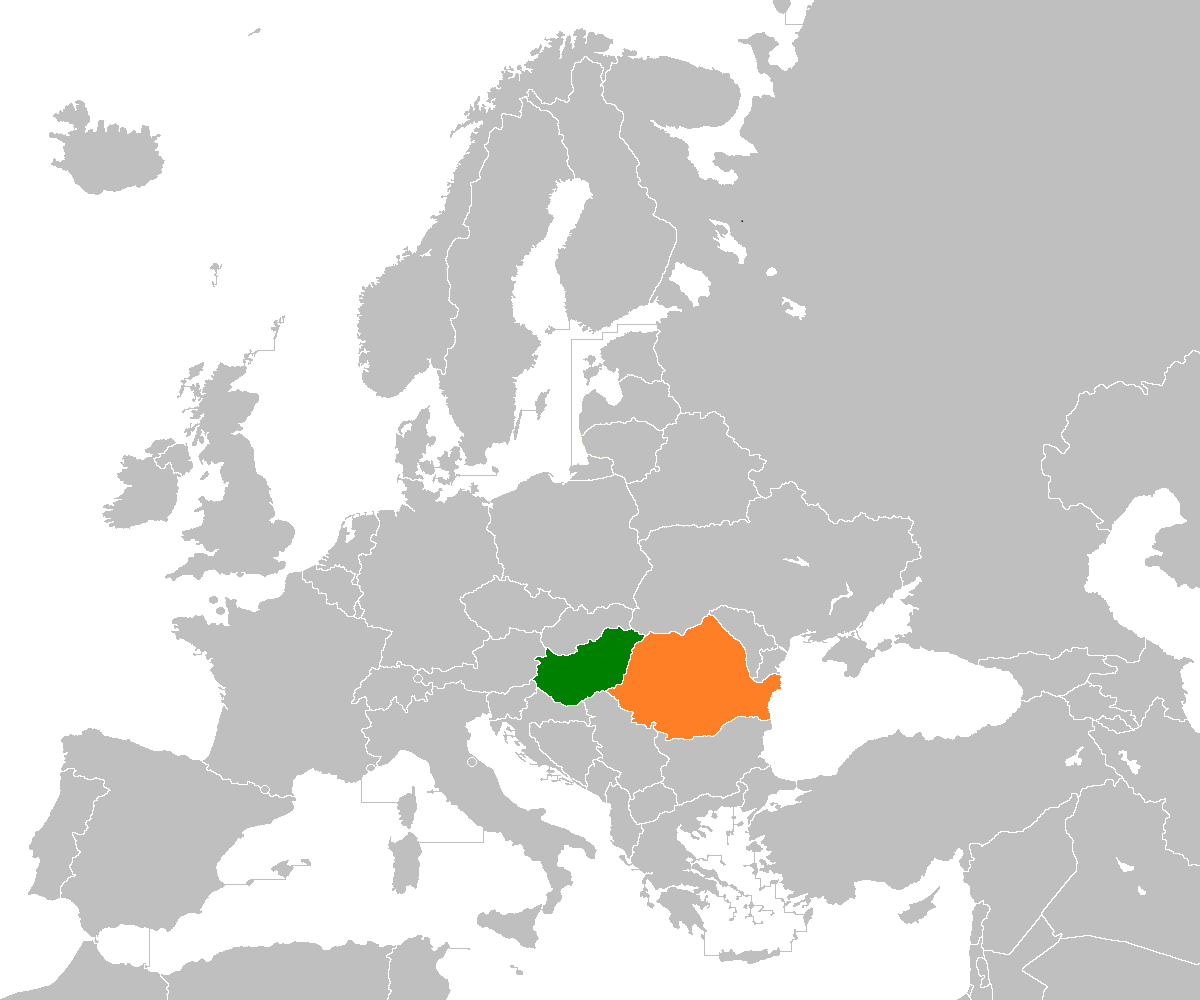

- Hungary: Romania

Relations between Hungary and Romania were officially established on 21 August 1920 in the current form, but the two countries have a long mutual history dating back to the Middle Ages. Transylvania, today entirely situated within the borders of Romania, has been a subject of animosity between the two states, having previously been part of the Kingdom of Hungary for centuries.

The countries share a border stretching for about 440 kilometers, which was fixed after the Treaty of Trianon and has not suffered serious modifications since, except during WWII. In the present day, the border is opened as a result of the Schengen Area to which both Hungary and Romania belong, as an extension of being European Union member states. They are also both part of NATO and various other economic and political groups, such as the Southeast European Cooperation Initiative.

As of 2026, the two nations are close on a political and economic level, though in recent years there have been of instances of tensions arising due to historical factors. Hungarians represent the biggest ethnic minority of Romania, accounting for almost 7% of Romania's entire population.

== History ==
Transylvania, a region of great cultural importance for both Romania and Hungary due to its history and ethnic composition, remains the focal point of tension between the two countries. This region is central to debates over cultural identity, minority rights and competing historical claims.

In Antiquity, Transylvania was part of the Dacian Kingdom, which was later conquered by Roman Emperor Trajan through the Dacian Wars, culminating in 106 AD. The region became a Roman Province, witnessing urbanization, the spread of Latin influence, and significant economic development. However, the province of Roman Dacia remained vulnerable and, by 271–275 AD, Rome abandoned it in the face of relentless barbarian invasions. Whether a Romanized population remained in the region is a topic of debate among historians.

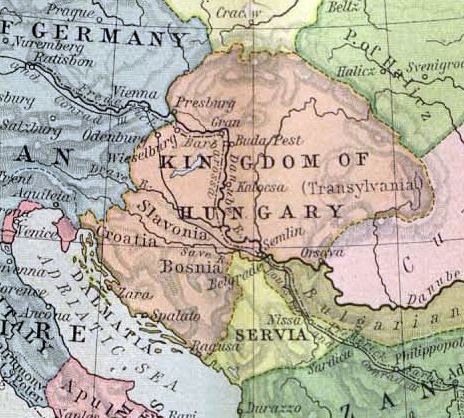
Transylvania as part of the Kingdom of Hungary in 1190.

As the Roman legions withdrew, a period of turmoil and migration ensued. Goths, Huns, Gepids, and Avars each left their mark on this region in the following centuries. Slavs began settling in Transylvania around the 7th century and left traces up to the end of the 12th century. During the 9th century, the First Bulgarian Empire extended its control over parts of Transylvania. The Magyar tribes occupied the Carpathian Basin around 895 AD, with evidence of their settlement in Transylvania dating to the first half of the 10th century, as proven by archaeological artifacts. The Gesta Hungarorum, the first Hungarian historical chronicle, written around 1200, claims that Transylvania was inhabited by Vlachs (Romanians) and Slavs during the Hungarian conquest. However, the reliability of this work is contested by some historians. Transylvania eventually became part of the Hungarian Kingdom in 1003, when King Stephen I of Hungary defeated its ruler, Gyula III, a local chieftain who controlled the region. Early documents about Transylvania make passing references to both Hungarians and Vlachs (Romanians), with the first official royal charter mentioning the latter in 1223. Hungarian historians claim the migration of Vlachs from the Balkans started around this period, meanwhile Romanian historians argue that their presence is linked to the continuity of the Romanized population of Dacia.

Throughout the medieval era, Transylvania maintained a unique status within the Hungarian Crown, governed by its own voivode and characterized by a tripartite ethnic and social structure comprising Hungarians, Saxons, and Szeklers, called the Unio Trium Nationum, with Romanians largely denied the privileges afforded to the other groups and confined to a lower social and economic position. In 1526, after the Battle of Mohács, Transylvania became part of the Eastern Hungarian Kingdom. The Principality of Transylvania emerged from this entity in 1570 through the Treaty of Speyer. During much of the 16th and 17th centuries, the principality existed as a vassal state of the Ottoman Empire, though it maintained a unique dual suzerainty, recognizing both the Ottoman Sultan and the Habsburg kings of Hungary as overlords. Wallachian ruler Michael the Brave briefly ruled Wallachia, Moldova, and Transylvania simultaneously for less than a year, from November 1599 until his death in September 1600. Transylvania's religious diversity grew in the wake of the Protestant Reformation, as Lutheran, Calvinist, and Unitarian movements took hold alongside Catholicism and Orthodox Christianity. Rulers such as John Sigismund and Gabriel Bethlen fostered religious tolerance and cultural development, making Transylvania a beacon of multi-confessional harmony in early modern Europe.

With the defeat of the Ottomans at the Battle of Vienna in 1683, the Habsburg monarchy gradually began to impose their rule on the formerly autonomous Transylvania. From 1711 onward, after the conclusion of Rákóczi's War for Independence, Habsburg control over Transylvania was consolidated, and the princes of Transylvania were replaced with Habsburg imperial governors. In 1765 the Grand Principality of Transylvania was proclaimed, consolidating the special separate status of Transylvania within the Habsburg Empire, established by the Diploma Leopoldinum in 1691. The Hungarian historiography sees this as a mere formality. Within the Habsburg Empire, Transylvania was administratively part of Kingdom of Hungary. The Romanian peasants, particularly, faced social and economic discrimination during this period, which led to uprisings like the Revolt of Horea, Cloșca, and Crișan in 1784. The Supplex Libellus Valachorum of 1791 marked an important step in the Romanian national movement, laying the groundwork for future struggles for equality and autonomy.

Throughout the 19th century, Transylvania was a focal point of nationalist movements, for both Hungarians and Romanians. During the Hungarian Revolution of 1848, both groups fought for their national aspirations, but their divergent goals escalated into direct conflict. Hungarians, led by Lajos Kossuth, sought independence from the Habsburg Empire and viewed Transylvania as part of a centralized Hungarian state. Romanians, meanwhile, led by Avram Iancu, demanded equality, the abolition of feudal privileges and recognition of their language. The conflict deepened ethnic divisions between the two communities, as numerous massacres took place in Transylvania during that time. The Habsburgs initially supported the Romanians to weaken the Hungarian Revolution but abandoned them after crushing the uprising in 1849 with Russian help. After the Austro-Hungarian Compromise of 1867, Transylvania was fully incorporated into the Kingdom of Hungary. This also marked the beginning of Magyarization policies in Transylvania.

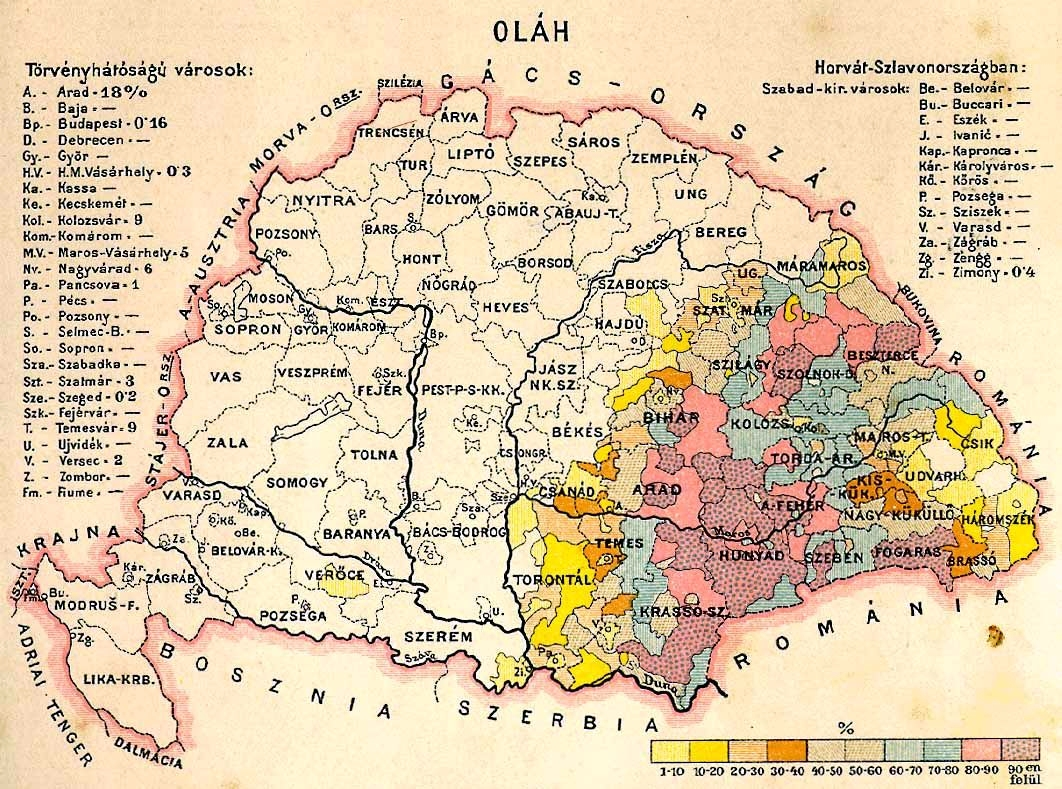
Romanians in Hungary according to 1890 Census.

In 1880, according to the official census, Transylvania had around 4 million inhabitants, of which 57.0% were Romanians, 25.9% Hungarians and 12.5% Germans. After the Unification of Wallachia and Moldavia in 1859, the newly formed Romanian Kingdom began to actively pursue the goal of incorporating Transylvania, which was deeply tied to the region's Romanian-majority population. This aspiration significantly influenced Romania's position during World War I. Initially neutral, Romania joined the Triple Entente in 1916, motivated by the promise of territorial gains, including Transylvania, as outlined in the secret Treaty of Bucharest signed that year. Although Romania's military campaign faced setbacks, including a temporary occupation by the Central Powers, the eventual collapse of Austria-Hungary in 1918 created the opportunity for the Union of Transylvania, Banat, Crișana and Maramureș with Romania, as proclaimed on 1 December 1918. This was met with resistance from Hungary, leading to the Hungarian–Romanian War of 1919. The newly proclaimed Hungarian Soviet Republic, led by Béla Kun, sought to reclaim territories lost during World War I. After a series of battles, the Romanian forces advanced deep into Hungary, eventually capturing Budapest in August 1919. This marked the end of the Hungarian Soviet Republic and solidified Romania's control over Transylvania.

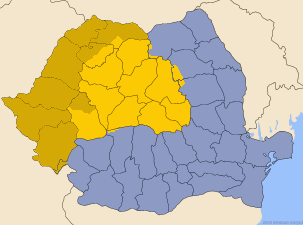
Map of Romania with "Transylvania proper" in bright yellow

The war concluded with the Treaty of Trianon in 1920, which formally recognized the union of Transylvania with Romania. However, the conflict left a legacy of tension between Hungary and Romania, as Hungary viewed the loss of Transylvania as a profound injustice, while Romania viewed the unification with Transylvania as a legitimate integration of Romanian-majority lands. More than 1.5 million Hungarian minority of Transylvania found itself becoming a minority group within Romania. Also after World War I, a group of Csángó families founded a village in Northern Dobruja known as Oituz, where Hungarians still live today.

Ethnic map of Northern Transylvania

In August 1940, during the Second World War, the northern half of Transylvania was returned to Hungary by the second Second Vienna Award. Historian Keith Hitchins summarizes the situation created by the award: Some 1,150,000 to 1,300,000 Romanians, or 48 per cent to over 50 per cent of the population of the ceded territory, depending upon whose statistics are used, remained north of the new frontier, while about 500,000 Hungarians (other Hungarian estimates go as high as 800,000, Romanian as low as 363,000) continued to reside in the south. The Treaty of Paris (1947) after the end of the Second World War overturned the Vienna Award, and the territory of northern Transylvania was returned to Romania. The post-World War II borders with Hungary agreed on at the Treaty of Paris were identical with those set out in 1920. After the war, in 1952, a Magyar Autonomous Region was created in Romania by the communist authorities. The region was dissolved in 1968, when a new administrative organization of the country (still in effect today) replaced regions with counties. The communist authorities, and especially after Nicolae Ceaușescu's regime came to power, restarted the policy of Romanianization. Today, "Transylvania proper" (bright yellow on the accompanying map) is included within the Romanian counties (județe) of Alba, Bistrița-Năsăud, Brașov, Cluj, Covasna, Harghita, Hunedoara, Mureș, Sălaj (partially) and Sibiu. In addition to "Transylvania proper", modern Transylvania includes Crișana and part of the Banat; these regions (dark yellow on the map) are in the counties of Arad, Bihor, Caraș-Severin, Maramureș, Sălaj (partially), Satu Mare, and Timiș.

== Conflicts ==
=== World War I ===
During the war, initially the Kingdom of Romania was neutral to the Central Powers, thus with Austria-Hungary. In August 1916 Romania entered the war on side of the Allies and attacked the Kingdom of Hungary, however it was pushed back to the frontier in October and by January 1917, two-thirds of Romania were occupied by the Central Powers. The Romanians were forced to retreat to the historical region of Moldavia, but were able to stave off complete collapse in 1917 by reorganizing their army and repulsing the Central Powers' offensive at Mărășești and Oituz. Nevertheless, after the October Revolution of 1917, Russia fell into civil war, and the Russian government signed two ceasefire agreements with the Central Powers, followed later (on 15 December) by a full armistice. Lacking Russian support, the Romanian government was subsequently forced to sue for peace, concluding in December 1917 the Armistice of Focșani.

=== Hungarian–Romanian War ===
In 1918, Romania re-entered the war with similar objectives to those of 1916. During the 1919 Hungarian–Romanian War Hungary, led by Communist forces, tried to secure its borders, however it was soon defeated and later occupied by Romanian forces.

=== Treaty of Trianon ===
The Treaty of Trianon was the peace agreement of 1920 that formally ended World War I between most of the Allies (among them the Kingdom of Romania) and the Kingdom of Hungary, the latter being one of the successor states to Austria-Hungary. As a result of the treaty the regions of Transylvania, parts of the Banat, Crișana and Maramureș became part of the Kingdom of Romania.

=== Interwar period and World War II ===
The Treaty of Trianon and its consequences dominated Hungarian public life and political culture in the inter-war period. Moreover, the Hungarian government swung then more and more to the right; eventually, under Regent Miklós Horthy, Hungary established close relations with Benito Mussolini's Fascist Italy and Adolf Hitler's Nazi Germany. These politics and the sought for revision succeeded to regain the territories of southern Czechoslovakia by the First Vienna Award in 1938 and the annexation of the remainder of Subcarpathia in 1939. These were only a fraction of the territories lost by the Treaty of Trianon, anyway the loss that the Hungarians resented the most was that of Transylvania ceded to the Romanians.

In 1940, the Soviet occupation of Bessarabia and Northern Bukovina inspired Hungary to escalate its efforts to resolve "the question of Transylvania". Hungary hoped to gain as much of Transylvania as possible, but the Romanians submitted only a small region for consideration. Eventually, the Hungarian-Romanian negotiations fell through entirely. After this, the Romanian government asked Italy and Germany to arbitrate. Foreign Ministers Joachim von Ribbentrop of Germany and Galeazzo Ciano of Italy met on 30 August 1940 at the Belvedere Palace in Vienna and decided that Romania cede Northern Transylvania, with an area of 43,104 km^{2} (16,643 sq mi) and a population of 2,577,260, out of which, according to the Romanian estimates, 1,304,903 were Romanians (50.2%) and 978,074 (37.1%) Hungarians, or, according to the Hungarian census of 1941, 53.5% were Hungarians and 39.1% Romanians.

In 1940, ethnic disturbances between Hungarians and Romanians continued after some incidents following the occupation of Northern Transylvania by the Hungarian military, culminating in massacres at Treznea and Ip. After some ethnic Hungarian groups considered unreliable or insecure were sacked/expelled from Southern Transylvania, the Hungarian officials also regularly expelled some Romanian groups from Northern Transylvania. Also, many Hungarians and Romanians fled or chose to opt between the two countries. There was a mass exodus; over 100,000 people on both sides of the ethnic and political borders relocated.

During World War II, Hungary and Romania became allies and participated in the war against the Soviet Union. But after the coup on 23 August 1944 Romania switched sides and fought against Hungary. Consequently, Soviet and Romanian troops invaded Hungary, occupied Northern Transylvania by October 1944 and re-established the Romanian administration in the region in March 1945. The 1947 Treaty of Paris reaffirmed the borders between Romania and Hungary as originally defined in Treaty of Trianon 27 years earlier, thus confirming the return of Northern Transylvania to Romania.

=== Post-Cold War Era ===
Areas of Transylvania where the Hungarian language has a special status.

Soon after the demise of the Communist regimes in Hungary and Romania, in March 1990, violent ethnic clashes in Transylvania strained the relationship between both countries to the brink of war. As a result, the first Open Skies Treaty in the world to mutually assess the strength and disposition of opposing military forces was worked out and became effective in 1992. This is considered a direct precursor of the 2002 multilateral Treaty on Open Skies that once included Russia and the United States.

Hungary and Romania are NATO allies and members of the European Union. However, nationalist tension persists.

== Bilateral relations ==
Romania's ethnic Hungarian party also participated in all the government coalitions between 1996 and 2008 and from 2009. In 1996, Romania signed and ratified a basic bilateral treaty with Hungary that settled outstanding disagreements, laying the foundation for closer, more cooperative relations.

== Economic relations ==
In 2012, the total amount of international trade between Romania and Hungary was 7.3 billion euro, of which exports from Romania were 2.4 billion euro, whereas exports from Hungary were 4.9 billion euro. Hungary ranks as the third of Romania's trade partners, after Germany and Italy.

MOL Group and OTP Bank, two of Hungary's largest companies, are present in Romania since 2003 and 2004 respectively. MOL Group operates (as of August 2013) a network of 138 fuel stations in Romania, which accounts for approximately 10 percent of the total network. OTP Bank has a widespread network of branches in Romania, with presence in every county. After 20 years of presence in Romania, OTP Group sells OTP Bank Romania. The buyer is Romania's market leader, Banca Transilvania. As a result of this agreement, OTP Group is selling the subsidiaries of OTP Bank Romania as well which results fully exiting the Romanian market.

Wizz Air is a low-cost airline from Hungary, which operates flights from several airports in Romania (Bucharest, Cluj-Napoca, Târgu Mureș, Sibiu, Timișoara, Iasi, Suceava and Craiova) to various destinations in Europe. It is the largest low-cost airline operating in Romania, and in 2013 it carried 3.2 million passengers on its over 72 local routes.

Digi Communications, Romania's leading company in internet and cable and satellite television services, is arguably the second or third company on the television market in Hungary, with (as of August 2013) around 22.4 percent of market share. DIGI Group's Romanian subsidiary (RCS & RDS) have concluded the sale and purchase agreement for the sale of DIGI group's Hungarian operations towards 4iG. The exit and sale was reported due to Digi was not only excluded from taking part in an auction for 5G access in Hungary but subsequently lost a court case against the Hungarian regulator NMHH.

Export and import from Hungary to Romania
Million (€)	2012	2013	2014	2015	..	2017
Export	4,767.23	4,600.36 ▼	4,609.39 ▲	4,742.39 ▲	..	5,600.00 ▲
Import	2,050.98	2,120 ▲	2,500.07 ▲	2,550.72 ▲	..	2,900.00 ▲
Balance	2,716.25	2,480.34	2,109.32	2,191.68	..	2,700.68

Most important Hungarian investors in Romania: MOL, Gedeon Richter Plc.

Most important Romanian investors in Hungary: Digi Communications, Automobile Dacia.

== European Union and NATO ==
Hungary joined the EU on 1 May 2004. Romania joined the EU on 1 January 2007. Hungary joined NATO on 12 March 1999. Romania joined NATO on 29 March 2004.

== Resident diplomatic missions ==
- Hungary has an embassy in Bucharest, consulates-general in Cluj-Napoca and Miercurea Ciuc, and honorary consulates in Timișoara, Iași, Constanța and Drobeta-Turnu Severin
- Romania has an embassy in Budapest and has consulates-general in Gyula and Szeged.
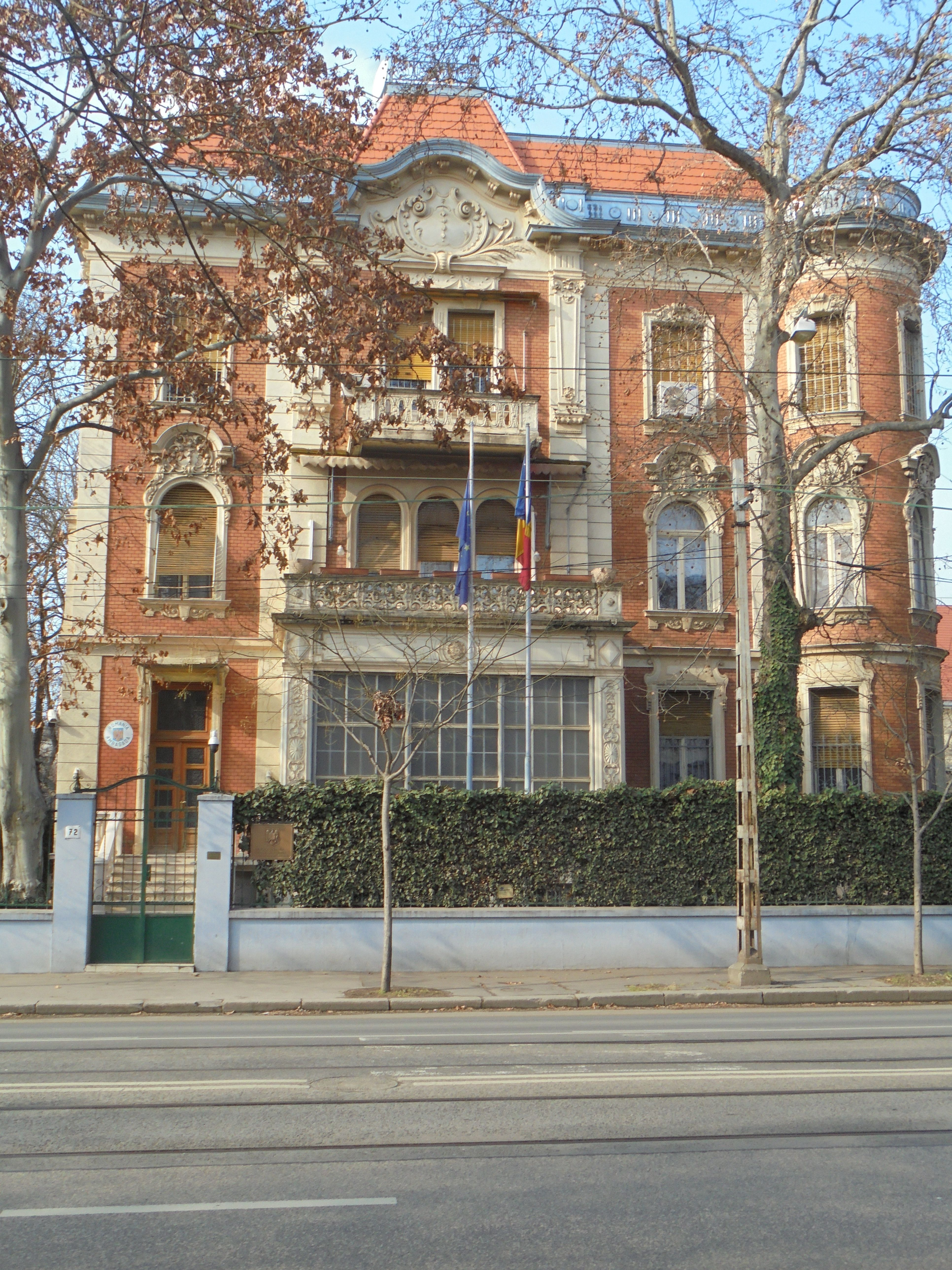
Embassy in Budapest

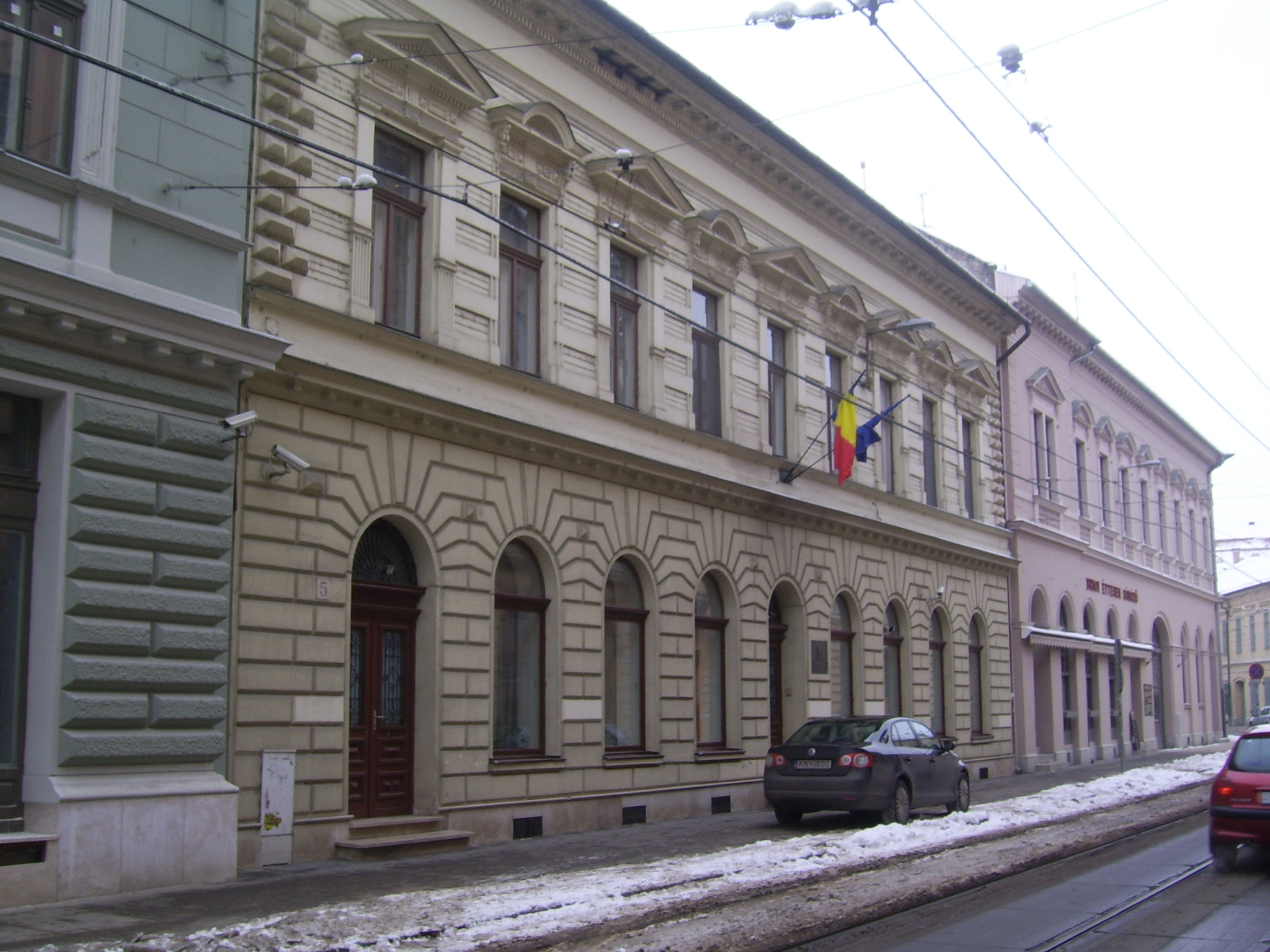
Consulate-General of Romania in Szeged

== See also ==
- Foreign relations of Hungary
- Foreign relations of Romania
- Hungarians in Romania
- Romanians in Hungary
- Hungary–Romania football rivalry
- Transylvanianism
- Union of Hungary and Romania
