= Federalist No. 71 =

Federalist Paper by Alexander Hamilton about executive term durations and limits

- Alexander Hamilton, author of Federalist No. 71
- Author: Alexander Hamilton
- Original title: The Duration in Office of the Executive
- Language: English
- Publisher: The New York Packet
- Publication date: March 18, 1788
- Publication place: United States
- Media type: Newspaper
- Preceded by: Federalist No. 70
- Followed by: Federalist No. 72

Federalist No. 71 is an essay by Alexander Hamilton, the seventy-first of The Federalist Papers. It was published on March 18, 1788, under the pseudonym Publius, the name under which all The Federalist papers were published. Its title is "The Duration in Office of the Executive", and it is the fifth in a series of 11 essays discussing the structure and powers of the executive branch.

It was published in the New York Packet in an effort to convince the people of New York to ratify the new Constitution. The papers were meant to urge New York and other states to ratify the proposed Constitution, which was a success at the end. This essay stated that the government should serve the public good. The legislature would control the judicial and executive, so they can all come to agreements with any conflicts that may be argued. It was about deciding the duration of the presidential term in office and the advantages and disadvantages it had for the president. Having a certain duration develops personal firmness in the employment in his or her constitutional powers. It also sets up a stable system of administration adopted under his sponsorship.

== Text ==
The Federalist No. 71 [70] ALEXANDER HAMILTON

From The New-York Packet, March 18, 1788. This essay appeared in The Independent Journal on March 19. It was numbered 71 in the McLean edition and 70 in the newspapers.

To the People of the State of New York.

DURATION in office has been mentioned as the second requisite to the energy of the executive authority. This has relation to two objects: To the personal firmness of the Executive Magistrate in the employment of his constitutional powers; and to the stability of the system of administration which may have been adopted under his auspices. With regard to the first, it must be evident, that the longer the duration in office, the greater will be the probability of obtaining so important an advantage. It is a general principle of human nature, that a man will be interested in whatever he possesses, in proportion to the firmness or precariousness of the tenure, by which he holds it; will be less attached to what he holds by a momentary or uncertain title, than to what he enjoys by a durable or certain title; and of course will be willing to risk more for the sake of the one, than for the sake of the other. This remark is not less applicable to a political privilege, or honor, or trust, than to any article of ordinary property. The inference from it is, that a man acting in the capacity of Chief Magistrate, under a consciousness, that in a very short time he must lay down his office, will be apt to feel himself too little interested in it, to hazard any material censure or perplexity, from the independent exertion of his powers, or from encountering the ill-humors, however transient, which may happen to prevail either in a considerable part of the society itself, or even in a predominant faction in the legislative body. If the case should only be, that he might lay it down, unless continued by a new choice; and if he should be desirous of being continued, his wishes conspiring with his fears would tend still more powerfully to corrupt his integrity, or debase his fortitude. In either case feebleness and irresolution must be the characteristics of the station.

There are some, who would be inclined to regard the servile pliancy of the executive to a prevailing current, either in the community, or in the Legislature, as its best recommendation. But such men entertain very crude notions, as well of the purposes for which government was instituted, as of the true means by which the public happiness may be promoted. The republican principle demands, that the deliberate sense of the community should govern the conduct of those to whom they entrust the management of their affairs; but it does not require an unqualified complaisance to every sudden breese of passion, or to every transient impulse which the people may receive from the arts of men, who flatter their prejudices to betray their interests. It is a just observation, that the people commonly intend the PUBLIC GOOD. This often applies to their very errors. But their good sense would despise the adulator, who should pretend that they always reason right about the means of promoting it. They know from experience, that they sometimes err; and the wonder is, that they so seldom err as they do; beset as they continually are by the wiles of parasites and sycophants, by the snares of the ambitious, the avaricious, the desperate; by the artifices of men, who possess their confidence more than they deserve it, and of those who seek to possess, rather than to deserve it. When occasions present themselves in which the interests of the people are at variance with their inclinations, it is the duty of the persons whom they have appointed to be the guardians of those interests, to withstand the temporary delusion, in order to give them time and opportunity for more cool and sedate reflection. Instances might be cited, in which a conduct of this kind has saved the people from very fatal consequences of their own mistakes, and has procured lasting monuments of their gratitude to the men, who had courage and magnanimity enough to serve them at the peril of their displeasure.

But however inclined we might be to insist upon an unbounded complaisance in the executive to the inclinations of the people, we can with no propriety contend for a like complaisance to the humors of the Legislature. The latter may sometimes stand in opposition to the former; and at other times the people may be entirely neutral. In either supposition, it is certainly desirable that the executive should be in a situation to dare to act his own opinion with vigor and decision.

The same rule, which teaches the propriety of a partition between the various branches of power, teaches us likewise that this partition ought to be so contrived as to render the one independent of the other. To what purpose separate the executive, or the judiciary, from the legislative, if both the executive and the judiciary are so constituted as to be at the absolute devotion of the legislative? Such a separation must be merely nominal and incapable of producing the ends for which it was established. It is one thing to be subordinate to the laws, and another to be dependent on the legislative body. The first comports with, the last violates, the fundamental principles of good government; and whatever may be the forms of the Constitution, unites all power in the same hands. The tendency of the legislative authority to absorb every other, has been fully displayed and illustrated by examples in some preceding numbers.*

* See Essays 48 and 49. (Editor)

In governments purely republican, this tendency is almost irresistible. The representatives of the people, in a popular assembly, seem sometimes to fancy that they are the people themselves; and betray strong symptoms of impatience and disgust at the least sign of opposition from any other quarter; as if the exercise of its rights by either the executive or judiciary, were a breach of their privilege and an outrage to their dignity. They often appear disposed to exert an imperious controul over the other departments; and as they commonly have the people on their side, they always act with such momentum as to make it very difficult for the other members of the government to maintain the balance of the Constitution.

It may perhaps be asked how the shortness of the duration in office can affect the independence of the executive on the legislature, unless the one were possessed of the power of appointing or displacing the other? One answer to this enquiry may be drawn from the principle already remarked, that is from the slender interest a man is apt to take in a short lived advantage, and the little inducement it affords him to expose himself on account of it to any considerable inconvenience or hazard. Another answer, perhaps more obvious, though not more conclusive, will result from the consideration of the influence of the legislative body over the people, which might be employed to prevent the re-election of a man, who by an upright resistance to any sinister project of that body, should have made himself obnoxious to its resentment.

It may be asked also whether a duration of four years would answer the end proposed, and if it would not, whether a less period which would at least be recommended by greater security against ambitious designs, would not for that reason be preferable to a longer period, which was at the same time too short for the purpose of inspiring the desired firmness and independence of the magistrate?

It cannot be affirmed, that a duration of four years or any other limited duration would completely answer the end proposed; but it would contribute towards it in a degree which would have a material influence upon the spirit and character of the government. Between the commencement and termination of such a period there would always be a considerable interval, in which the prospect of annihilation would be sufficiently remote not to have an improper effect upon the conduct of a man endued with a tolerable portion of fortitude; and in which he might reasonably promise himself, that there would be time enough, before it arrived, to make the community sensible of the propriety of the measures he might incline to pursue. Though it be probable, that as he approached the moment when the public were by a new election to signify their sense of his conduct, his confidence and with it, his firmness would decline; yet both the one and the other would derive support from the opportunities, which his previous continuance in the station had afforded him of establishing himself in the esteem and good will of his constituents. He might then hazard with safety, in proportion to the proofs he had given of his wisdom and integrity, and to the title he had acquired to the respect and attachment of his fellow citizens. As on the one hand, a duration of four years will contribute to the firmness of the executive in a sufficient degree to render it a very valuable ingredient in the composition; so on the other, it is not long enough to justify any alarm for the public liberty. If a British House of Commons, from the most feeble beginnings, from the mere power of assenting or disagreeing to the imposition of a new tax, have by rapid strides, reduced the prerogatives of the crown and the privileges of the nobility within the limits they conceived to be compatible with the principles of a free government; while they raised themselves to the rank and consequence of a coequal branch of the Legislature; if they have been able in one instance to abolish both the royalty and the aristocracy, and to overturn all the ancient establishments as well in the church as State; if they have been able on a recent occasion to make the monarch tremble at the prospect of an innovation*

* This was the case with respect to Mr. Fox's India bill which was carried in the House of Commons, and rejected in the House of Lords, to the entire satisfaction, as it is said, of the people. (Publius) The bill, introduced in the House of Commons in 1783 by Charles James Fox, provided for reorganization of the government of India. After it passed by a vote of two to one, George III sent word to the House of Lords that he would regard anyone voting for it as a personal enemy, and the bill was defeated there by thirteen votes. (Editor)

attempted by them; what would be to be feared from an elective magistrate of four years duration, with the confined authorities of a President of the United States? What but that he might be unequal to the task which the Constitution assigns him? I shall only add that if his duration be such as to leave a doubt of his firmness, that doubt is inconsistent with a jealousy of his encroachments.

PUBLIUS.

== Alexander Hamilton's view ==
Hamilton defended the provision of the constitution for a presidential term of four years. Against the argument that this was too long a term and would increase the risk of the president amassing too much power, Hamilton defended the four-year term due to the energy the president should attain. To him, having an energetic executive meant someone who holds true power and intelligence which was apparent when building a strong union. He argued that a term of four years would give the president the ability to counteract temporary passions or influences of faction that may from time to time convulse the American people and their representatives in Congress. According to Hamilton, it is the duty of the executive "to protect the interests of the people and the greater good of the nation, even when the people may, as a result of being deceived or manipulated, demand the adoption of flawed policy" (Gradesaver). He goes on to argue that a four-year term and the ability to run for reelection will make the president determined to pursue policies he believes will have the greatest impact. He thought that a term which is four years will give the president the ability to influence the American people and the representatives in Congress. According to Hamilton, it is the executive's responsibility to guard the nation's greater good even when the people mandate the acceptance of flawed policy. Four years will also enable the president to follow policies he feels are best after Congress approves. It is also enough time to commit to that position and not lose sight of why they are there in the first place.

Hamilton also makes the case for duration, meaning a presidential term long enough to promote stability in the government. While Hamilton elaborates on the importance of duration in Federalist No. 73, he argues briefly in Federalist No. 71 that the prospect of more time in office will motivate a president to act in concert with the views of the public. Hamilton claims that "safety in the republican sense" depends on "duration" because a unitary executive structure promoting energy in the executive is only safe if the possibility of re-election gives the executive a strong incentive to make policy in conformity with public opinion.
