= List of treaties unsigned or unratified by the United States =

This is a list of international treaties the United States has either not signed, not ratified, or signed/ratified but later withdrawn its signature/ratification from.

== Background ==
"[The President] shall have Power, by and with the Advice and Consent of the Senate, to make Treaties, provided two-thirds of the Senators present concur..."

— Treaty Clause (U.S. Constitution)

The Treaty Clause in Article Two of the United States Constitution dictates that the President of the United States negotiates treaties with other countries or political entities, and signs them. Signed treaties enter into force only if ratified by at least two-thirds (67 members) of the United States Senate. (Technically, the Senate itself does not ratify treaties, it only approves or rejects resolutions of ratification submitted by the Committee on Foreign Relations; if approved, the United States exchanges the instruments of ratification with the foreign power(s)). Between 1789 and 1990, the Senate approved more than 1,500 treaties, rejected 21, and 85 treaties were withdrawn because the Senate did not act on them. As of December 2014, 36 treaties signed by the President were awaiting action by the Senate.

Among the treaties unsigned or unratified by the United States, a few have been singled out by organizations such as Human Rights Watch (2009), as extremely important, and the United States’ reluctance to ratify them problematic. Among the treaties are the Convention on the Elimination of All Forms of Discrimination against Women (CEDAW), the Convention on the Rights of the Child (CRC), the International Convention for the Protection of All Persons from Enforced Disappearance (ICPPED), the Ottawa Treaty (Mine Ban Treaty), the Convention on Cluster Munitions (CCM), the Convention on the Rights of Persons with Disabilities, and the Optional Protocol to the Convention against Torture (OPCAT). The United States is also one of the few countries not to have ratified the Kyoto Protocol. According to a 2014 analysis by The New Republic, the ratification of a significant number of treaties signed after 1990 has been blocked by senators of the Republican Party for various ideological reasons.

== Multilateral ==
This list includes multilateral treaties that the United States has never ratified or has withdrawn from and which the United States signed, officially debated signing, or negotiated. It also includes treaties signed or ratified without the participation of the United States by a majority of sovereign countries (at any given time) or UN member states.

Year	Treaty	U.S. status	Current parties
1919	Treaty of Versailles	Strongly influenced by Woodrow Wilson. The US ratified the separate U.S.–German Peace Treaty (1921) and did not join the League of Nations.	23
1930	Forced Labour Convention	signed, not ratified	181
1948	Freedom of Association and Protection of the Right to Organise Convention	not signed	158
1949	Right to Organise and Collective Bargaining Convention, 1949	not signed	168
1950	Convention for the Suppression of the Traffic in Persons and of the Exploitation of the Prostitution of Others	not signed	82
1951	Convention Relating to the Status of Refugees	only 1967 protocol	146 (147 for 1967 protocol)
1951	Equal Remuneration Convention	signed, not ratified	174
1954	Convention Relating to the Status of Stateless Persons	not signed	99
1958	Discrimination (Employment and Occupation) Convention	signed, not ratified	175
1960	Convention against Discrimination in Education	signed, not ratified	111
1961	Convention on the Reduction of Statelessness	not signed	82
1962	Convention on Consent to Marriage, Minimum Age for Marriage and Registration of Marriages	signed, not ratified	55
1964	Employment Policy Convention, 1964	signed, not ratified	115
1966	International Covenant on Economic, Social and Cultural Rights	signed, not ratified	173
1966	First Optional Protocol to the International Covenant on Civil and Political Rights	not signed	116
1966	Constitution of the United Nations Industrial Development Organization	joined in 1985, withdrew in 1996	174
1969	Convention on the Non-Applicability of Statutory Limitations to War Crimes and Crimes Against Humanity	signed, not ratified	56
1969	Vienna Convention on the Law of Treaties	signed, not ratified	118
1973	Minimum Age Convention, 1973	signed, not ratified	176
1977	American Convention on Human Rights	signed, not ratified	23
1977	Protocol I (Geneva Conventions amendment)	signed, not ratified	175
1977	Protocol II (Geneva Conventions amendment)	signed, not ratified	170
1979	Convention on the Elimination of All Forms of Discrimination Against Women (CEDAW)	signed 1980, not ratified	189
1979	Moon Treaty	not signed	17
1981	Occupational Safety and Health Convention, 1981	signed, not ratified	76
1982	United Nations Convention on the Law of the Sea (UNCLOS)	signed 1994 Agreement on Implementation, but not ratified; ratified the predecessor Convention on the Territorial Sea and the Contiguous Zone	171 + EU
1989	Second Optional Protocol to the International Covenant on Civil and Political Rights	not signed	92
1989	Convention on the Rights of the Child (CRC)	signed 1995, not ratified	196
1989	Basel Convention	signed, not ratified	190 + EU
1990	International Convention on the Protection of the Rights of All Migrant Workers and Members of Their Families	not signed	60
1992	Convention on Biological Diversity (CBD)	signed, not ratified	195 + EU
1992	Treaty on Open Skies	signed in 1992, withdrew in 2020	32
1994	Convention on the Safety of United Nations and Associated Personnel	signed, not ratified	94
1996	Comprehensive Nuclear-Test-Ban Treaty	signed, not ratified	178 (not in force)
1997	Kyoto Protocol	signed, not ratified	191 + EU
1997	Ottawa Treaty (Mine Ban Treaty)	not signed	162
1998	Rome Statute of the International Criminal Court	signed 1998, withdrew 2002	125
1999	Optional Protocol to the Convention on the Elimination of All Forms of Discrimination against Women (OP-CEDAW)	not signed	189
2000	Cartagena Protocol on Biosafety (supplement to CBD)	not signed	173
2001	Stockholm Convention on Persistent Organic Pollutants	signed, not ratified	185+EU
2002	Optional Protocol to the Convention against Torture (OPCAT)	not signed	95
2003	Convention for the Safeguarding of the Intangible Cultural Heritage	not signed	185
2003	WHO Framework Convention on Tobacco Control	signed, not ratified	182
2007	International Convention for the Protection of All Persons from Enforced Disappearance (ICPPED)	not signed	77
2007	Convention on the Rights of Persons with Disabilities	signed 2009, not ratified	190
2008	Convention on Cluster Munitions (CCM)	not signed	112
2011	Anti-Counterfeiting Trade Agreement (ACTA)	signed, not ratified	1 (not in force)
2013	Arms Trade Treaty (ATT)	signed, not ratified	116
2015	Paris Agreement	Signed 2016, withdrew 2020, rejoined 2021, withdrew 2025	193 + EU
2016	Trans-Pacific Partnership (TPP)	signed 2016, withdrew 2017	2 (not in force); 12 for the replacement Comprehensive and Progressive Agreement for Trans-Pacific Partnership
2023	High Seas Treaty	signed, not ratified	87

A treaty establishing a Free Trade Area of the Americas was negotiated from 1994 to 2005, but never signed.

== Bilateral treaties ==
Year	Treaty	Depositary	U.S. status
1972	Anti-Ballistic Missile Treaty	Bilateral US–Soviet treaty	ratified 1972, withdrew 2002
1979	Salt II	Bilateral US–Soviet treaty	signed 1979, withdrew 1980
1987	Intermediate-Range Nuclear Forces Treaty	Bilateral US–Soviet treaty	ratified 1988, withdrew 2019

== See also ==
- List of United States treaties
- Foreign policy of the United States
- List of treaties
