= Treaty Clause =

Clause of the Constitution of the United States

The Treaty Clause of the United States Constitution (Article II, Section 2, Clause 2) establishes the procedure for ratifying international agreements. It empowers the President as the primary negotiator of agreements between the United States and other countries, and holds that the advice and consent of a two-thirds supermajority of the Senate renders a treaty binding with the force of federal law.

== Text ==
[The President] shall have Power, by and with the Advice and Consent of the Senate, to make Treaties, provided two-thirds of the Senators present concur...

== Background ==
=== Treaties under the Articles of Confederation ===
As with the drafting of the U.S. Constitution as a whole, the Treaty Clause was influenced by perceived flaws and limitations of the Articles of Confederation, the first governmental framework of the United States. The Articles established a weak central government and accorded significant autonomy and deference to the individual states. The unicameral Congress of the Confederation was the sole national governing body, with both legislative and executive functions, including the power to make treaties. However, to take effect, treaties needed the approval of a supermajority of states (nine out of thirteen), a high bar that prevented many foreign pacts from being made. Although states were obligated by the Articles not to "interfere" with Congress' international commitments, in practice they often ignored or even defied such agreements.

The weakness of the Articles with respect to foreign affairs was most pronounced with respect to the Treaty of Paris with Great Britain, which stipulated that Congress protect the property rights of British creditors and Loyalists. Many state governments either failed to enforce the treaty or took measures to deliberately violate it. In response to protests by the British government, the U.S. Secretary for Foreign Affairs John Jay, could only propose that Congress request state legislatures to repeal all legislation that conflicted with the treaty and to authorize state courts to enforce it. While a bare majority of states complied to varying degrees, the inability of the national government to follow through on its obligations to foreign powers proved to be both an international embarrassment and potentially damaging to national interests; many Founding Fathers worried that nations would likewise renege on treaties with the United States or refrain from entering treaties that would be beneficial to trade and commerce.

=== Debate about treaty making in the Constitutional Convention ===
In response to various concerns about the ineffectualness of the Articles, a Constitutional Convention was held in 1787 to debate and draft a more robust governing document. During the Convention, it was initially contemplated that the U.S. Senate, the newly proposed upper house of Congress, would have the power to make treaties (as well as to appoint ambassadors and judges of the Supreme Court). Just ten days before the Convention adjourned, it was decided that these powers would be shared with the President. Many delegates cited the established international tradition of executives holding exclusive power over foreign relations and agreements; the participation of the Senate through the "advice and consent" mechanism was added as something of a compromise.

Leading federalists like John Jay, James Madison, and Alexander Hamilton all supported this arrangement, particularly the amount of agency given to the President relative to the Senate. In Federalist No. 64, Jay argued that while the Senate would check presidential powers in treaty making, the President would have the power, when necessary, to negotiate international agreements without senatorial approval. Madison, hailed as the Father of the Constitution, described the Treaty Clause as giving the Senate only "partial agency" in the President’s foreign-relations power. Hamilton argued in Federalist No. 75 that the Article II procedure made the two branches "appropriately combined" in foreign affairs:

The qualities elsewhere detailed as indispensable in the management of foreign negotiations point out the executive as the most fit agent in those transactions; while the vast importance of the trust and the operation of treaties as laws plead strongly for the participation of the whole or a portion of the legislative body in the office of making them

By contrast, Rufus King, who had participated in the Convention, declared as a Senator in 1818 that "the Senate may, and ought to, look into and watch over every branch of the foreign affairs of the nation; they may, therefore, at any time call for full and exact information respecting the foreign affairs, and express their opinion and advice to the President respecting the same, when, and under whatever other circumstances, they may think such advice expedient." Likewise, several prominent delegates at the Convention argued unsuccessfully for the House of Representatives to participate in treaty-making. However, the idea was widely rejected, due to the fact that the House was a much larger body than the Senate, and thus would be less likely to act decisively or keep certain sensitive agreements secret. Additionally, delegates from smaller states were wary of being disadvantaged in foreign affairs, since the House benefited more populous states; by contrast, the Senate guaranteed every state an equal voice through two senators, regardless of population.

== Treaties as "law of the land" ==
Federal statutes and treaties are similarly regarded as the "supreme law of the land" per the Supremacy Clause of the U.S. Constitution, with "no superior efficacy ... given to either over the other". Thus, by virtue of ratification, a treaty is incorporated into the body of U.S. federal law no differently than a legislative act.

As with statutes, treaties are subject to judicial interpretation and review. The legally binding nature of treaties under the Constitution has been consistently recognized by the courts; as early as 1796, the U.S. Supreme Court, in Ware v. Hylton, applied the Supremacy Clause for the first time in ruling that a treaty superseded conflicting state law. Although the Ware decision did not address the Treaty Clause explicitly, it held that both states and private citizens were bound to comply with the treaty obligations of the federal government, which was in turn bound to the "law of nations" with respect to honoring treaties.

Shortly after the Ware ruling, in the 1801 case, United States v. Schooner Peggy, the court cited a treaty in support of a private citizen's lawsuit against the government, and for the first time elaborated upon the legal significance of constitutionally ratified international agreements:

It is certainly true that the execution of a contract between nations is to be demanded from, and, in the general, superintended by the executive of each nation, and therefore whatever the decision of this court may be relative to the rights of parties litigating before it, the claim upon the nation, if unsatisfied, may still be asserted. But yet where a treaty is the law of the land, and as such affects the rights of parties litigating in court, that treaty as much binds those rights and is as much to be regarded by the court as an act of congress; and although restoration may be an executive, when viewed as a substantive act, independent of and unconnected with other circumstances, yet to condemn a vessel, the restoration of which is directed by a law of the land, would be a direct infraction of that law, and of consequence improper.

Although courts have since differed on the enforceability of some types of international agreements, as well as on the precise scope of a treaty's legal obligations, it is generally agreed by constitutional scholars and the judiciary that treaties are generally as binding as federal law.

== Entry into force ==
U.S. law distinguishes self-executing treaties, which do not require additional legislative action to take effect, and non-self-executing treaties, which must be implemented by an act of the legislature. While such distinctions of procedure and terminology do not affect the binding status of accords under international law, they do have major implications under U.S. law; in the 1829 case, Foster v. Nielson, Chief Justice John Marshall, while affirming that a treaty is constitutionally the "law of the land", first articulated the difference between self-executing and non-self-executing agreements domestically:

Our constitution declares a treaty to be the law of the land. It is, consequently, to be regarded in courts of justice as equivalent to an act of the legislature, whenever it operates of itself, without the aid of any legislative provision. But when the terms of the stipulation import a contract—when either of the parties engages to perform a particular act, the treaty addresses itself to the political, not the judicial department; and the legislature must execute the contract, before it can become a rule for the court.

In Missouri v. Holland (1920) the Supreme Court ruled that the constitutional power to make treaties is separate from the other enumerated powers of the federal government; hence treaties can be used to legislate in areas otherwise within the exclusive authority of the states, and by implication, in areas not within the scope of the federal government or its branches. However, this broad interpretation was circumscribed in Reid v. Covert (1957), which held that the Bill of Rights could not be abrogated by a treaty; the ruling is widely interpreted as limiting the ability of treaties to circumvent constitutional restrictions overall.

The Supreme Court clarified the enforceability of treaties in Medellín v. Texas (2008), a decision that is widely interpreted by both courts and jurists as further limiting the power of treaties. The court ruled that treaties, even if otherwise constituting an international obligation, do not automatically have the force of domestic law unless they are explicitly "self-executing" in the text or implemented by an act of Congress. The Medellin decision likewise limited the President's ability to unilaterally enforce an international agreement without the explicit delegation of Congress.

== The Treaty Clause and other international agreements ==
It is debated among constitutional scholars and courts whether the Treaty Clause represents the only legal means of entering into international agreements. Though the Constitution does not expressly provide for an alternative to the Article II treaty procedure, Article I, Section 10 does distinguish between "treaties" (which states are forbidden to make) and "agreements" (which states may make with the consent of Congress). Some legal scholars have read this provision as permitting "a class of less-important international agreements" that did not warrant the Treaty Clause procedure.

As early as 1791, then Secretary of State Thomas Jefferson explained that the Article II treaty procedure is not necessary when there is no long-term commitment:

It is desirable, in many instances, to exchange mutual advantages by Legislative Acts rather than by treaty: because the former, though understood to be in consideration of each other, and therefore greatly respected, yet when they become too inconvenient, can be dropped at the will of either party: whereas stipulations by treaty are forever irrevocable but by joint consent....

Alternatives to formal treaties are common throughout U.S. history, and in fact comprise the majority of agreements with other nations. Beyond the Treaty Clause, laws governing U.S. foreign policy provide for two other mechanisms for making international agreements: congressional-executive agreements, which, like federal statutes, require simple majorities in both the Senate and the House of Representatives followed by the signature of the President; and executive agreements, which are entered into unilaterally by the President pursuant to constitutional executive powers.

While indistinguishable from treaties under international law, such agreements are legally distinct under U.S. law; for example, the Supremacy Clause applies only to foreign pacts made pursuant to the Treaty Clause. The Supreme Court has generally upheld non-treaty agreements in limited circumstances. A congressional-executive agreement can only cover matters that the Constitution explicitly places within the powers of Congress and the President; likewise, a sole-executive agreement can only concern subjects within the President's authority, or for which Congress has delegated authority to the President.

In general, arms control agreements are often ratified by the treaty mechanism; trade agreements, such as the North American Free Trade Agreement and the U.S. accession to the World Trade Organization, usually take the form of congressional-executive agreements, and typically include an explicit right to withdraw after giving sufficient written notice to the other parties. If an international commercial accord contains binding "treaty" commitments, then a two-thirds vote of the Senate may be required. Executive agreements, for which the exact scope remains unsettled by the courts, generally pertain to matters implicating diplomatic relations, such as claim settlements between U.S. citizens and foreign nationals, or national security, such as the Joint Comprehensive Plan of Action concerning Iran's nuclear program.

Treaties are comparatively rare in modern U.S. foreign policy. Between 1946 and 1999, the federal government completed nearly 16,000 international agreements, of which only 6% (912) were treaties submitted to the Senate for approval under Article II of the Constitution; most were congressional-executive agreements.

== Role of Congress ==
Although Article II of the Constitution pertains to the executive branch, the Treaty Clause provides that the power to make treaties is shared between the President and the Senate. However, the clause has never been interpreted as giving the Senate the power or duty to advise the President before a treaty is concluded; in practice, the Senate's authority is limited to either disapproving or approving a treaty, with the latter including the power to attach conditions or reservations.

=== Repeal of treaties ===
James Madison contended that Congress had the constitutional right and duty to modify or repeal treaties based on its own determination of what is expedient for the national interest. Beginning with the 1884 Head Money Cases, the U.S. Supreme Court has consistently held that Congress can abrogate a treaty through subsequent legislative action, even if this amounts to a violation of the treaty under international law. The court has also maintained that the judiciary "have nothing to do and can give no redress" with respect to the international consequences and controversies arising from such Congressional action, since it is a political question beyond judicial review. Subsequently, Congressional modifications of a treaty will be enforced by U.S. courts regardless of whether foreign actors still consider the old treaty obligations binding upon the U.S.

Additionally, the Supreme Court has consistently held that an international accord that is inconsistent with the U.S. Constitution is void, as would be case with any other federal law in conflict with the Constitution. This principle was most clearly established in the 1957 case Reid v. Covert, which held that "no agreement with a foreign nation can confer power on the Congress, or on any other branch of Government, which is free from the restraints of the Constitution". Consequently, the Supreme Court could theoretically rule an Article II treaty unconstitutional and void under domestic law, although it has not yet done so.

In Goldwater v. Carter, Congress challenged the constitutionality of President Jimmy Carter's unilateral termination of a defense treaty with Taiwan. The case went before the Supreme Court but was dismissed without hearing an oral argument by a majority of six Justices, on the grounds that "The issue at hand ... was essentially a political question and could not be reviewed by the court, as Congress had not issued a formal opposition"; Justice Brennan dissented, arguing that the "issue of decision-making authority must be resolved as a matter of constitutional law, not political discretion" and therefore was subject to judicial review.

Presently, there is no Supreme Court ruling on whether the President has the power to break a treaty without the approval of Congress; it remains unclear which branch of government is empowered by the Constitution to terminate a treaty, much less the procedure for doing so. In practice, a president may terminate a treaty unilaterally if permitted by said treaty's terms. President George W. Bush unilaterally withdrew the United States from the Anti-Ballistic Missile Treaty in 2002, six months after giving the required notice of intent, but faced no judicial interference nor legal action.

== Scope of presidential powers ==
As early as the George Washington administration—the first under the Constitution and therefore the Treaty Clause—presidents have generally not sought the Senate's participation in all stages of treaty-making. Washington had initially consulted the Senate on proposed treaties, but ultimately abandoned the practice after finding it unproductive. The subsequent and widely accepted practice is that the President independently negotiates and signs treaties and then presents the proposed treaty to the Senate for its approval or disapproval.

Like Washington, many Presidents have approached the Article II treaty process in different ways. Theodore Roosevelt, whose administration had a robust foreign policy, argued that ratification was necessary where an international accord would bind subsequent governments:

The Constitution did not explicitly give me power to bring about the necessary agreement with Santo Domingo. But the Constitution did not forbid my doing what I did. I put the agreement into effect, and I continued its execution for two years before the Senate acted; and I would have continued it until the end of my term, if necessary, without any action by Congress. But it was far preferable that there should be action by Congress, so that we might be proceeding under a treaty which was the law of the land and not merely by a direction of the Chief Executive which would lapse when that particular executive left office. I therefore did my best to get the Senate to ratify what I had done.

A sole-executive agreement can only be negotiated and entered into through the president's authority (1) in foreign policy, (2) as commander-in-chief of the armed forces, (3) from a prior act of Congress, or (4) from a prior treaty. Agreements beyond these competencies must have the approval of Congress (for congressional-executive agreements) or the Senate (for treaties).

In 1972, Congress passed legislation requiring the president to notify Congress of any executive agreements that are formed.

Although the nondelegation doctrine prevents Congress from delegating its legislative authority to the executive branch, Congress has allowed the executive to act as its "agent" in trade negotiations, such as by setting tariffs, and, in the case of Trade Promotion Authority, by solely authoring the implementing legislation for trade agreements. The constitutionality of this delegation was upheld by the Supreme Court in Field v. Clark (1892).

== See also ==
- Appointments Clause
- Foreign policy of the United States
- Jus tractatuum
- List of United States treaties
- List of treaties unsigned or unratified by the United States
- Supremacy Clause
