= Open Skies Treaty between Hungary and Romania =

Bilateral treaty in force from 1992 to 2001

Agreement Between the Government of Romania and the Government of the Republic of Hungary on the Establishment of an Open Skies Regime / Acord din 11 mai 1991 intre Guvernul Romaniei si Guvernul Republicii Ungaria privind stabilirea unui regim de Cer Deschis
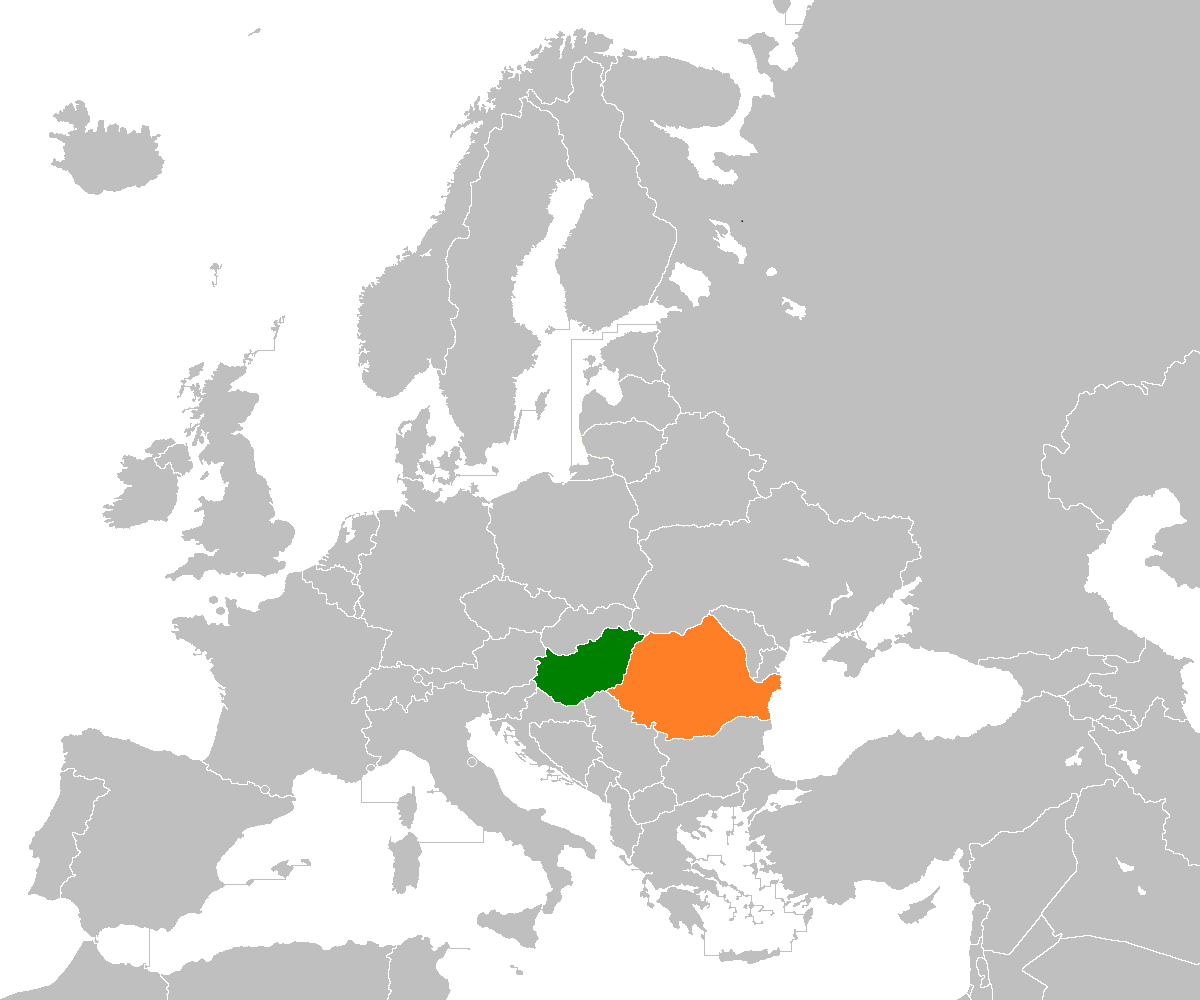
- Map showing Hungary (green) and Romania (orange) within Europe
- Signed: 11 May 1991
- Location: Bucharest, Romania
- Effective: 27 February 1992
- Condition: 2 ratifications
- Expiration: 31 December 2001
- Signatories: 2
- Parties: Hungary, Romania
- Ratifiers: 2
- Languages: Romanian, Hungarian

The Open Skies Treaty between Hungary and Romania was a bilateral agreement between Hungary and Romania in force from 1992 to 2001. The Treaty became effective on 27 February 1992 and consisted of agreed-upon surveillance overflights between the two countries to assess the strength and disposition of opposing military forces. It was the first such "Open Skies" Agreement and a precursor to the Treaty on Open Skies that entered into force between NATO members and members of the former Warsaw Pact on 1 January 2002, to which Hungary and Romania are both signatories. A demonstration flight was carried out in June 1991.

The main motivation for the Treaty was to demonstrate stable relations between the two countries after violent clashes between almost 20,000 ethnic Romanians and Hungarians at Târgu Mureș in March 1990. The clashes took place in Transylvania, a region that was detached from Hungary and transferred to Romania by the Treaty of Trianon in 1920, that had gone back and forth between the two countries in 1940s, and which is home to a substantial Hungarian minority.

== See also ==
- Hungary–Romania relations
- Multilateral Treaty on Open Skies that entered into force in 2002
