= Federalist No. 69 =

Federalist Paper by Alexander Hamilton

- Alexander Hamilton, author of Federalist No. 69
- Author: Alexander Hamilton
- Original title: The Real Character of the Executive
- Language: English
- Publisher: The Independent Journal, New York Packet, The Daily Advertiser
- Publication date: March 14, 1788
- Publication place: United States
- Media type: Newspaper
- Preceded by: Federalist No. 68
- Followed by: Federalist No. 70

Federalist No. 69 is an essay by Alexander Hamilton, the sixty-ninth of The Federalist Papers. It was published on March 14, 1788 under the pseudonym Publius, under which all The Federalist papers were published. The title is "The Real Character of the Executive", and is the third in a series of 11 essays discussing the powers and limitations of the Executive branch in response to the Anti-Federalist Papers, and in comparison to the King of Great Britain's powers.

== Overview ==
In Federalist No. 69, Alexander Hamilton sought to explain the nature of the executive branch in order to address the primary concern of Anti-Federalists that the U.S. President would function as an elected monarch. Memories of unpopular British policies were fresh in the mind of Anti-Federalists, and they were not ready to accept any new government that would resemble Britain's.

Specifically, Hamilton "explained that the president's authority 'would be nominally the same with that of the King of Great Britain, but in substance much inferior to it. It would amount to nothing more than the supreme command and direction of the military and naval forces, as first general and admiral of the confederacy'".

== Hamilton's arguments ==
=== Maintaining of the Army ===
Hamilton also highlights the different standings of both the proposed American President and the King of Great Britain in maintaining their armies. The President has the ability to conduct war as he sees fit, if authorized by an Act of Congress (consistent with specified powers of the Legislative Branch under Article I, Section 8 of the Constitution), and he also is identified as the primary "Commander-in-Chief" of both the army and the navy (Article II, Section 2), with the power to nationalize state militias and to command them. Hamilton discusses how the President has the liberty to make calls, as to the operation of the military, when they see fit. This is also a collective decision amongst the Cabinet, appointed by the President; however, though it is a group decision, the final call is made by the President. However, the King of Great Britain does not operate the same, Hamilton argues. The King of Great Britain makes the final call in everything, without regards to either House of Parliament. Both are contrasted and have various limitations in the leadership of their respective militaries. While the President may have command of the state militia on occasion, the King of Great Britain maintains full control of the militia at all times.

=== Pardons ===
The President "ha[s] Power to grant Reprieves and Pardons for Offenses against the United States, except in Cases of Impeachment" under Article II of the US Constitution. Hamilton compares the President's power to that of the governor of New York's in that the Governor may pardon all offenses except those of treason and murder but can pardon for impeachment. Hamilton's argument states that the governor has impunity from impeachment while the President is liable to be impeached and then if convicted, to be removed from office and later to be prosecuted under the course of law.

=== Foreign policies and treaty-making ===
Federalist No. 69 also discusses the President's, as well as the King of Great Britain's, foreign policy powers and their variations in constitutional powers. With regard to treaties with foreign nations, Hamilton highlights the fact that the assent of two-thirds of the Senate is required for the United States to enter into any treaty with a foreign nation. As a result, the President is unable to fully conduct foreign policy on his own and there is democratic participation on issues of foreign policy. Meanwhile, the King of Great Britain has no such restrictions on his ability to enter into various deals with foreign nations, restricting the public's ability to comment on or participate in the way their country is dealing with other nations. (Note: Such a requirement eventually evolved de facto under the Ponsonby Rule in the 1900s, and established in law by the Constitutional Reform and Governance Act 2010.) Importantly, Hamilton addresses the Anti-Federalist concern of foreign relations by explaining the limitation on presidential power as opposed to the King of Great Britain's unrestricted ability to enter into treaties.

=== Veto of legislative action ===
Hamilton explains that the presidential power to veto is limited, as opposed to the King of Great Britain's power to overturn an act of Parliament absolutely. However, the limitations that the President has with this authority is also crucial in how the country is run. While the President does have the ability to veto something he may not agree with, Congress is permitted to neglect the decision of the President (if it is deemed unfit), and proceed with a two-thirds vote in favor of the bill in question. He discusses how there does leave "wiggle room" for a righteous law to be passed, as opposed to the King of Great Britain, who has the power to decline the passing of the bill with no way for Parliament to overturn his decision. As a result, Hamilton draws contrast between the limitations on the veto power of the American President and that of the King of Great Britain's absolute power to veto a legislative act.

=== Currency and commerce ===
While Hamilton highlights both, Britain and the United States are contrasted in the way their currency and commerce is conducted. Based on the United States, Congress has the full authority to deal with the conduct of how interstate commerce and currency is handled. Everything pertaining to business and financial responsibilities goes through Congress. Congress is responsible for providing an outline of laws for everyone to follow. These are enforced through the executive branch (the President) and are upheld in the judicial branch. This is crucial and fundamental in the country and how it is operated because the foundations of the economy is built primarily on how the money is operated in corporations, businesses, taxes, etc. Britain, on the other hand, is operated similarly where the interstate commerce laws are also administered by the British Parliament, however, these laws aren't as enforced as the United States' Congress. Both set of laws of interstate commerce and fundamentals to the handling of currency are fairly similar in their conduct and Hamilton highlights both in Federalist Paper 69.

=== Elected officials ===
The President of the United States is given the power to appoint public ministers, Supreme Court judges, and all officers established by law. However, the president needs the approval of the Senate in order to appoint any of the listed individuals above. On the other hand, the King of Great Britain has the same role of appointing public ministers but is not bounded by any other section of government. Hamilton explains not only is he not bounded by other branches of government, but the King of Great Britain is able to appoint public ministers to all offices as well as create offices. The King of Great Britain is also enabled to give titles of nobility at his own discretion.
