= Federalist No. 74 =

Federalist Paper by Alexander Hamilton

- Alexander Hamilton, author of Federalist No. 74
- Author: Alexander Hamilton
- Original title: The Command of the Military and Naval Forces, and the Pardoning Power of the Executive
- Language: English
- Publisher: The Independent Journal, New York Packet, The Daily Advertiser
- Publication date: March 25, 1788
- Publication place: United States
- Media type: Newspaper
- Preceded by: Federalist No. 73
- Followed by: Federalist No. 75

Federalist No. 74 is an essay by Alexander Hamilton, the seventy-fourth of The Federalist Papers. It was published on March 25, 1788, under the pseudonym Publius, the name under which all The Federalist papers were published. Its title is "The Command of the Military and Naval Forces, and the Pardoning Power of the Executive", and it is the eighth in a series of 11 essays discussing the powers and limitations of the Executive branch.

In this paper, Hamilton justifies the President's status as the commander of the militia, as well as the President's power to grant pardons.

== See also ==
- Federal pardons in the United States
