= Jean-Louis de Lolme =

Genevan-British writer (1740–1806)

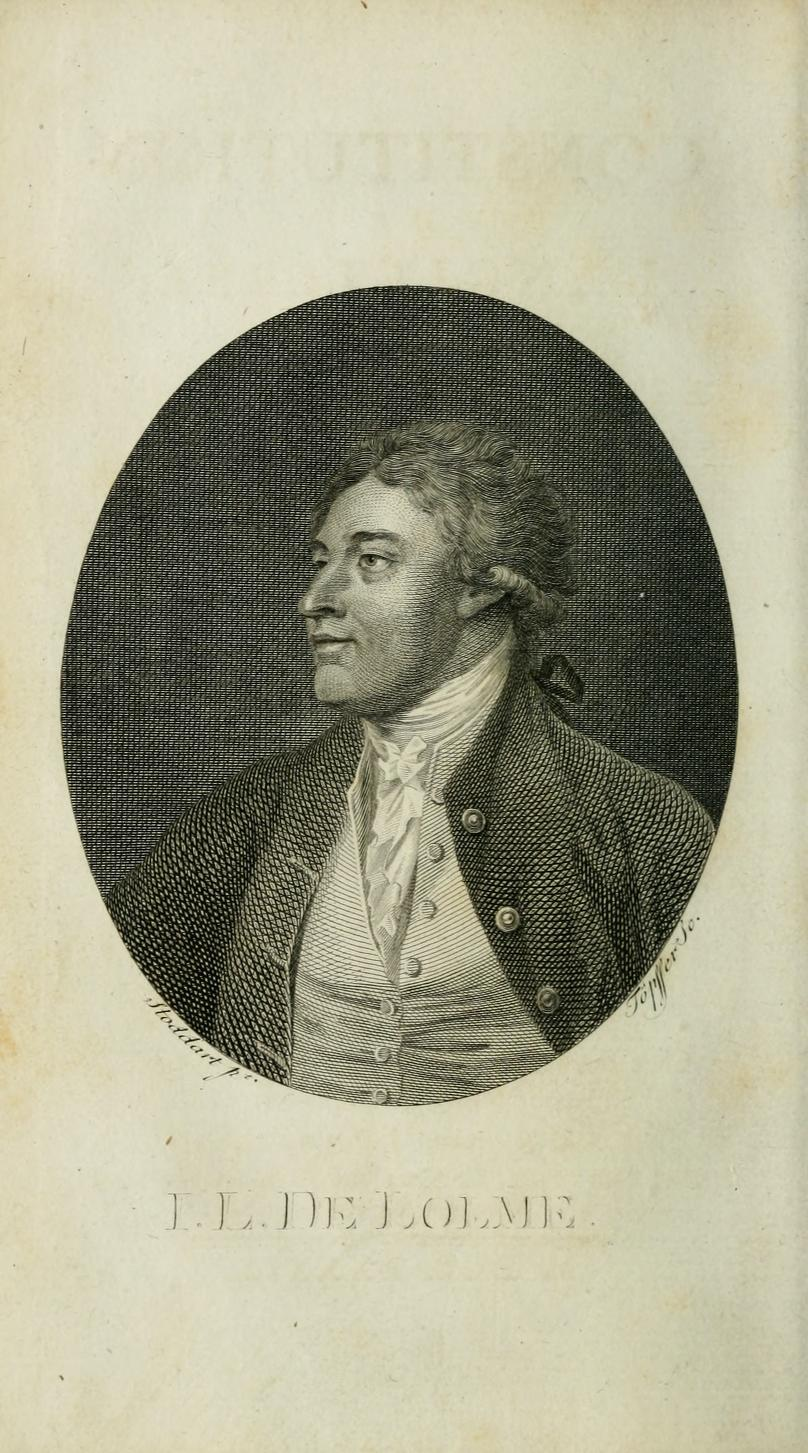
- From Constitution de l'Angleterre (1789)
- Born: 1740; Geneva, Republic of Geneva
- Died: 16 July 1806 (aged 65–66); Seewen, Canton of Schwyz
- Citizenship: Republic of Geneva and English
- Occupations: Political theorist; writer on constitutional matters
- Writing career
- Language: French
- Notable works: Constitution de l'Angleterre (The Constitution of England, 1771)

Jean-Louis de Lolme (French: [ʒɑ̃ lwi də lɔlm]) or Delolme (1740 – 16 July 1806) was a Genevan and British political theorist and writer on constitutional matters, born in the then independent Republic of Geneva. As an adult he moved to England, and became a British subject. His most famous work was Constitution de l'Angleterre (The Constitution of England, 1771), which was subsequently published in English as well. He advocated for the English system as an Aristotelian mixed government.

He also praised the element of representative democracy in the constitution, and urged an extension of suffrage. The work influenced many of the framers of the United States Constitution.

== Early life ==
De Lolme was born in the then independent Republic of Geneva in 1740. He pursued legal studies and began practicing law, but had to emigrate due to a pamphlet he authored titled "Examen de trois parts de droit" (Examination of Three Parts of Rights), which offended the local authorities. He took refuge in England, where he lived for several years on the meagre and precarious income derived from occasional contributions to various journals.

== Writing career ==
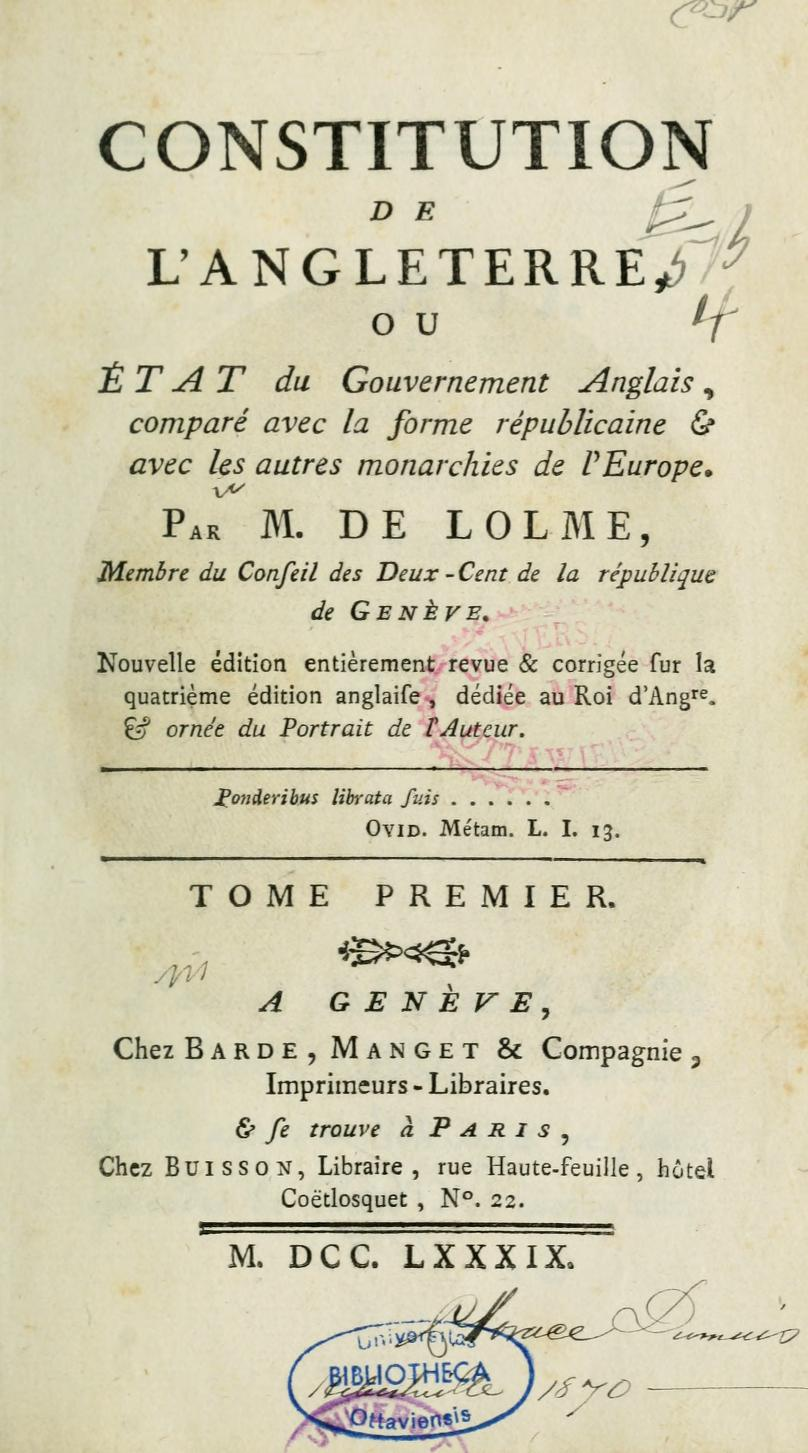
The title page of a 1789 edition of de Lolme's Constitution de l'Angleterre (The Constitution of England)

During his protracted exile in England, De Lolme made a careful study of the English constitution, the results of which he published in his Constitution de l'Angleterre (The Constitution of England, Amsterdam, 1771), of which an enlarged and improved edition in English appeared in 1775, and was several times reprinted. The work excited much interest as containing many acute observations on the causes of the excellence of the English constitution as compared with those of other countries. However, it was termed by the 11th edition of the Encyclopædia Britannica (1911) as "wanting in breadth of view, being written before the period when constitutional questions were treated in a scientific manner".

In the book, de Lolme advocated a constitutional form of government enshrining the principle of balanced government, balancing the one, the few, and the many, or the ideas of monarchy, aristocracy, and democracy. He criticised the power of the British parliament and coined an expression which became proverbial: "parliament can do everything but make a woman a man and a man a woman". Nonetheless, de Lolme extolled the British government because, in his view, which was influenced by his own observations and study as well as by the previous writings of Voltaire and Montesquieu, the unwritten constitution of the United Kingdom embodied the ideal of balanced government better than any other government of the time. In particular, he praised the element of representative democracy in the constitution, and urged an extension of suffrage. De Lolme developed and refined his political thinking to a large extent in opposition to the more radical theory of direct democracy advocated by his compatriot, Jean-Jacques Rousseau, whom he accused of being unrealistic. De Lolme is sometimes identified as a probable candidate for being the person behind the pseudonymous political commentator Junius.

De Lolme also wrote in English A Parallel between the English Government and the Former Government of Sweden (1772); The History of the Flagellants (c. 1776), based upon a work by Nicolas Boileau-Despréaux; An Essay, Containing a Few Strictures on the Union of Scotland with England (1787); and one or two smaller works.

== Later life ==
In 1775, de Lolme found himself compelled to accept aid from a charitable society to enable him to return home. He died at Seewen, a village in the Canton of Schwyz, on 16 July 1806.

== Legacy ==
De Lolme's Constitution de l'Angleterre, along with a translation of David Hume's History of England (1754–1761), supplied philosophers of the time with most of their ideas about the English constitution. It was therefore used somewhat as a political pamphlet. The work has been studied by French bourgeois revolutionary Madame Roland at the age of 22 and influenced many of the framers of the United States Constitution. One Founding Father who was not present in Philadelphia, but whose Defence of the Constitutions of Government of the United States (1787) influenced the delegates there, was John Adams, who praised De Lolme's book as one of the best on the subject of constitutionalism ever written. Some have argued that De Lolme's work also influenced the Constitution of Norway.

== Selected works ==
- Constitution de l'Angleterre [The Constitution of England], Amsterdam: Chez E. van Harrevelt, 1771, OCLC 65353904. Later editions:
  - The Constitution of England: Or, An Account of the English Government; in which it is Compared, both with the Republican Form of Government, and Occasionally with the Other Monarchies in Europe, London: Printed by T. Spilsbury, and sold by G. Kearsley, 1775, OCLC 265591647.
  - Constitution de l'Angleterre, ou, État du gouvernement anglais, comparé avec la forme républicaine et avec les autres monarchies de l'Europe [The Constitution of England, or, The State of the English Government, Compared with the Republican Form and with the Other Monarchies of Europe], Geneva: Chez Barde, Manget & Compagnie, Imprimeurs-Libraires. & se trouve à Paris, Chez Buisson, Libraire, Rue Haute-feuille, hôtel Coëtlosquet, No. 22, 1789, OCLC 27983401.
  - Jean-Louis de Lolme (2007), David Lieberman (ed.), The Constitution of England (PDF), Indianapolis, Ind.: Liberty Fund, ISBN 978-0-86597-465-4.
- A Parallel between the English Constitution and the Former Government of Sweden; Containing Some Observations on the Late Revolution in that Kingdom; and an Examination of the Causes that Secure Us against both Aristocracy, and Absolute Monarchy, London: Sold by [J.] Almon, Bookseller, in Piccadilly, 1772, OCLC 642244901.
- The History of the Flagellants or the Advantages of Discipline; Being a Paraphrase and Commentary on the Historia flagellantium of the Abbé Boileau ... By somebody who is not Doctor of the Sorbonne, London: Sold by M. Hingeston, Yeats and Robertson, and Fielding and Walker, c. 1776, OCLC 85883406.
- An Essay, Containing a Few Strictures on the Union of Scotland with England; and on the Present Situation of Ireland. Being an Introduction to De Foe's History of the Union, London: Printed for John Stockdale, 1787, OCLC 519178740.
