= Federalist No. 72 =

Federalist Paper by Alexander Hamilton

- Alexander Hamilton, author of Federalist No. 72
- Author: Alexander Hamilton
- Original title: The Same Subject Continued, and Re-Eligibility of the Executive Considered
- Language: English
- Publisher: The Independent Journal, New York Packet, The Daily Advertiser
- Publication date: March 19, 1788
- Publication place: United States
- Media type: Newspaper
- Preceded by: Federalist No. 71
- Followed by: Federalist No. 73

Federalist No. 72, titled "The Same Subject Continued, and Re-Eligibility of the Executive Considered", is an essay by Alexander Hamilton. It is the seventy-second essay of The Federalist Papers and the sixth in a series of eleven essays discussing the structure and powers of the Executive branch. The essay was first published in The New York Packet on March 18, 1788, under the pseudonym Publius, the name under which all essays of The Federalist Papers were published.

The essay focuses on whether the president should be eligible for reelection without a term limit. Hamilton argued that re-eligibility was essential to executive power.

== Summary ==
In Federalist No. 72, Alexander Hamilton argues that re-eligibility is essential to executive power. He believed that the Presidency must attract the most ambitious individuals and re-eligibility ensured that they would not attempt to extend their term in office unconstitutionally. While Hamilton hoped for a class of 'disinterested' public servants, he acknowledged the importance of self-interest, stating that "the desire for reward is one of the strongest incentives of human conduct."

Hamilton believed that executives should be eligible to serve as many terms as the American people allow. He argued that limits on re-eligibility would hamper an experienced president to use his past expertise. In addition, Hamilton argued that term limits prevent an executive from using experience gained in emergency situations in other terms and that term limits restrict stability within the executive.

The Twenty-second Amendment to the Constitution imposed the present two-tier term limit on the executive branch. Today, U.S. presidents can only serve two terms, or if a succession has taken place, ten years, as president of the country.
