= Federalist No. 73 =

Federalist Paper by Alexander Hamilton

- Alexander Hamilton, author of Federalist No. 73
- Author: Alexander Hamilton
- Original title: The Provision For The Support of the Executive, and the Veto Power
- Language: English
- Publisher: The Independent Journal, New York Packet, The Daily Advertiser
- Publication date: March 21, 1788
- Publication place: United States
- Media type: Newspaper
- Preceded by: Federalist No. 72
- Followed by: Federalist No. 74

Federalist No. 73 is an essay by the 18th-century American statesman Alexander Hamilton. It is the seventy-third of The Federalist Papers, a collection of articles written to promote the ratification of the United States Constitution. It was published on March 21, 1788, under the pseudonym Publius, the name under which all The Federalist papers were published. Its title is "The Provision For The Support of the Executive, and the Veto Power", and it is the seventh in a series of 11 essays discussing the powers and limitations of the Executive branch of the United States government.

This paper discusses and justifies the executive branch's powers over the Legislature, namely, the Legislature's lack of power to increase or decrease the salary of the President during his/her term, and the Executive Veto.

Hamilton discusses the benefits of the executive veto. He argues that it "shields" the executive from legislative control and it acts as a "check upon the legislative body" which prevents Congress from enacting laws subject to special interests and factional impulses.
