= Treaty on Open Skies =

Promoting openness and transparency of military forces and activities

Open Skies Treaty
Treaty on Open Skies
- Signed: 24 March 1992 (also start of provisional application)
- Location: Helsinki
- Effective: 1 January 2002
- Condition: 20 ratifications
- Ratifiers: 35
- Depositary: Governments of Canada and Hungary
- Languages: English, French, German, Italian, Russian, and Spanish

The Treaty on Open Skies establishes a program of unarmed aerial surveillance flights over the entire territory of its participants. The treaty is designed to enhance mutual understanding and confidence by giving all participants, regardless of size, a direct role in gathering information about military forces and activities of concern to them. It entered into force on 1 January 2002, and currently has 32 party states. The idea of allowing countries to openly surveil each other is thought to prevent misunderstandings (e.g., to assure a potential opponent that one's country is not about to go to war) and limit the escalation of tensions. It also provides mutual accountability for countries to follow through on treaty promises.

The concept of "mutual aerial observation" was initially proposed to Soviet Premier Nikolai Bulganin at the Geneva Conference of 1955 by U.S. President Dwight D. Eisenhower; however, the Soviets promptly rejected the concept and it lay dormant for several years. The treaty was eventually signed as an initiative of U.S. president (and former Central Intelligence Agency Director) George H. W. Bush in 1989. Negotiated by the then-members of NATO and the Warsaw Pact, the agreement was signed in Helsinki, Finland, on 24 March 1992.

On 22 November 2020, the United States withdrew from the treaty, and on 15 January 2021, Russia also announced its intention to leave, citing the U.S. withdrawal and the inability of member nations to guarantee that information gathered would not be shared with the U.S. Russia formally withdrew in December 2021.

== Membership ==
The 32 state parties to the Open Skies Treaty are Belarus, Belgium, Bosnia and Herzegovina, Bulgaria, Canada, Croatia, the Czech Republic, Denmark (including Greenland), Estonia, Finland, France, Georgia, Germany, Greece, Hungary, Iceland, Italy, Latvia, Lithuania, Luxembourg, the Netherlands, Norway, Poland, Portugal, Romania, Slovakia, Slovenia, Spain, Sweden, Turkey, Ukraine, and the United Kingdom. Kyrgyzstan signed the treaty but has not yet ratified it. Canada and Hungary are the depositaries of the treaty in recognition of their special contributions to the Open Skies process. Depositary countries maintain treaty documents and provide administrative support.

The Open Skies treaty is one of unlimited duration, and is open to accession by other states. Republics of the former Soviet Union (U.S.S.R.) that have not already become state parties to the treaty may join it at any time. Applications from other interested countries are subject to a consensus decision by the Open Skies Consultative Commission (OSCC). Eight countries have joined into the treaty since it entered into force in 2002: Bosnia and Herzegovina, Croatia, Estonia, Finland, Latvia, Lithuania, Slovenia, and Sweden.

== Open Skies Consultative Commission ==
The Open Skies Consultative Commission is the implementing body for the Treaty on Open Skies. It comprises representatives from each state party to the treaty and meets monthly at the Vienna headquarters of the Organization for Security and Co-operation in Europe.

== Summary ==
=== Territory ===
The Open Skies regulations covers the territory over which the parties exercise sovereignty, including mainland, islands, and internal and territorial waters. The treaty specifies that the entire territory of a member state is open to observation. Observation flights may only be restricted for reasons of flight safety and not for reasons of national security.

=== Aircraft ===
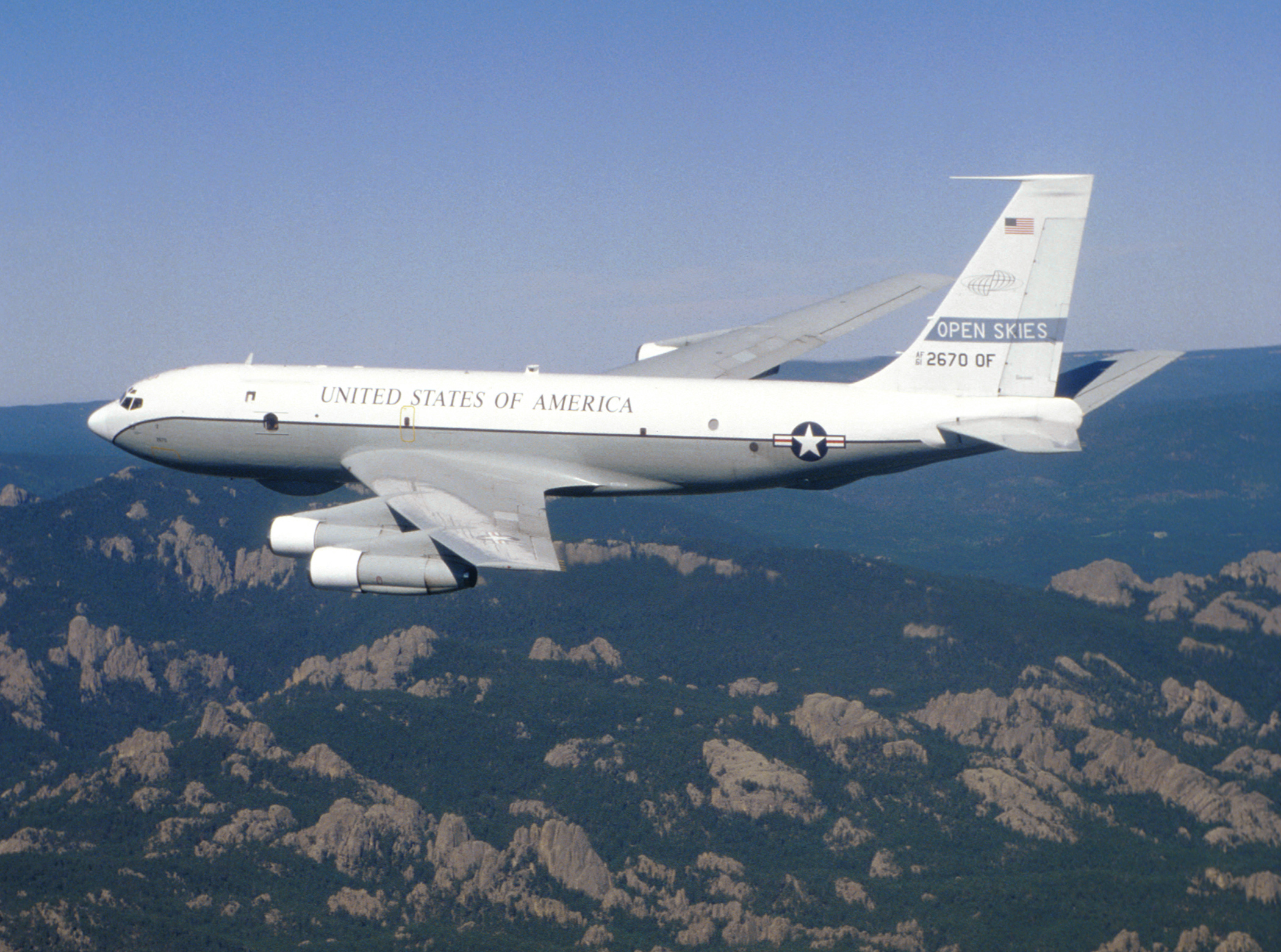
A USAF Boeing OC-135B Open Skies

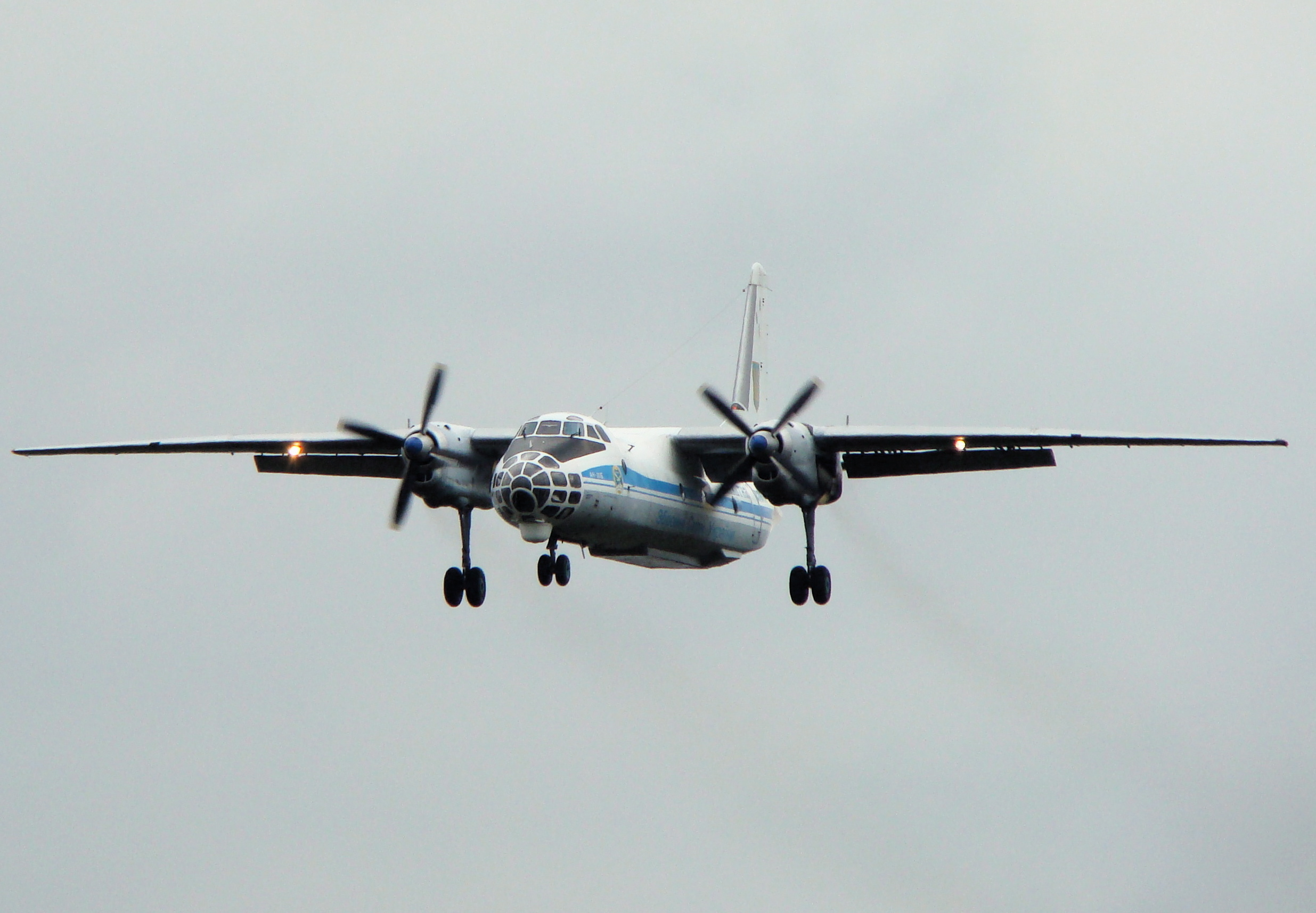
An-30 monitoring aircraft

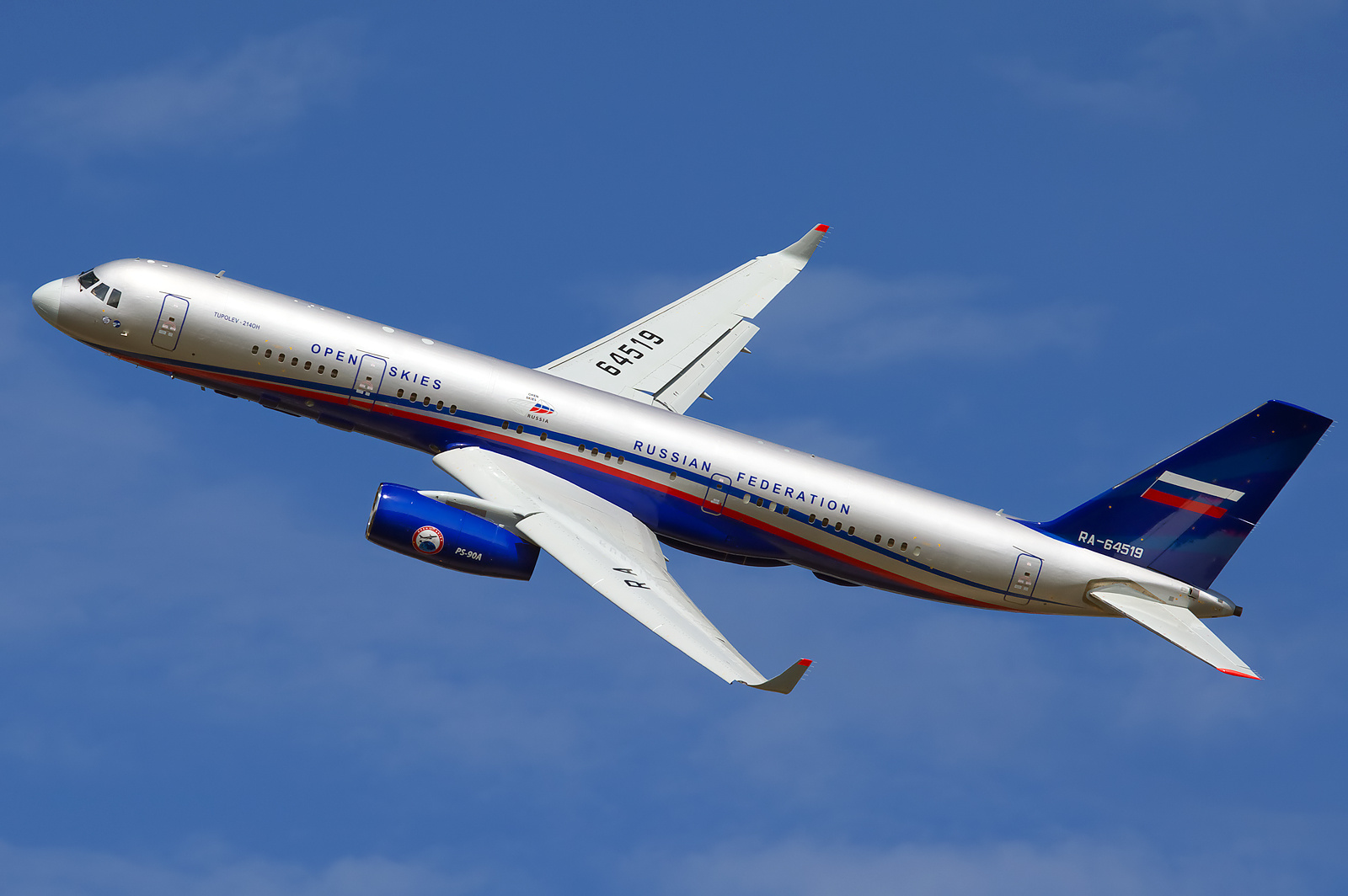
Tupolev Tu-214ON of the Russian Air Force

Observation aircraft may be provided by either the observing party or by the observed party (the "taxi option"), at the latter's choice. All Open Skies aircraft and sensors must pass specific certification and pre-flight inspection procedures to ensure that they are compliant with treaty standards.

The official certified U.S. Open Skies aircraft is the OC-135B Open Skies.

Canada uses a C-130 Hercules aircraft equipped with a "SAMSON" sensor pod to conduct flights over other treaty nations. The pod is a converted CC-130 fuel tank modified to carry the permitted sensors, along with associated on-board mission systems. A consortium of nations consisting of Belgium, Netherlands, Luxembourg, Canada, France, Greece, Italy, Portugal, and Spain own and operate this system. The costs of maintaining the SAMSON Pod are shared, based on each nation's flight quota and actual use.

Bulgaria, Romania, Russia, and Ukraine use the Antonov An-30 for their flights. The Czech Republic also used to use the An-30 for this purpose but apparently retired all of theirs from service in 2003.

Russia also uses a Tu-154M-ON monitoring aircraft. Germany formerly used this type as well until the aircraft was lost in a 1997 accident. Russia is phasing out both An-30 and Tu-154M-ON and replacing them with two Tu-214ON with the registrations RA-64519 and RA-64525. This aircraft's new sensor suite, though, is being challenged by the US.

Sweden uses a Saab 340 aircraft ("OS-100") that was certified in 2004.

Until 2008, the U.K. designated aircraft was an Andover C.1(PR) aircraft, registration XS596. Since then the U.K. has used a variety of aircraft including a Saab 340, an An-30, and an OC-135.

In 2017, the German Air Force purchased an Airbus A319 as its future Open Skies aircraft.

=== Sensors ===
Open Skies aircraft may have video, optical panoramic, and framing cameras for daylight photography, infrared line scanners for a day/night capability, and synthetic aperture radar for a day/night all weather capability. Photographic image quality will permit recognition of major military equipment (e.g., permit a member state to distinguish between a tank and a truck), thus allowing significant transparency of military forces and activities. Sensor categories may be added and capabilities improved by agreement among member states. All sensors used in Open Skies must be commercially available to all signatories. Imagery resolution is limited to 30 centimetres.

=== Quotas ===
Each state party is obligated to receive observation flights per its passive quota allocation. Each state party may conduct as many observation flights – its active quota – as its passive quota. During the first three years after entry into force, each state was obligated to accept no more than seventy-five percent of its passive quota. Since the overall annual passive quota for the United States is 42, this means that it was obligated to accept no more than 31 observation flights a year during this three-year period. Only two flights were requested over the United States during 2005, by the Russian Federation and Republic of Belarus group of states parties (which functions as a single entity for quota allocation purposes). The United States is entitled to 8 of the 31 annual flights available over Russia/Belarus. Additionally, the United States is entitled to one flight over Ukraine, which is shared with Canada.

=== Data sharing and availability ===
Imagery collected from Open Skies missions is available to any state party upon request for the cost of reproduction. As a result, the data available to each state party is much greater than that which it can collect itself under the treaty quota system.

== History ==
At a Geneva Conference meeting with Soviet Premier Nikolai Bulganin in 1955, U.S. President Eisenhower proposed that the United States and Soviet Union conduct surveillance overflights of each other's territory to reassure each country that the other was not preparing to attack. The fears and suspicions of the Cold War led Soviet General Secretary Nikita Khrushchev to reject Eisenhower's proposal, known as the Open Skies proposal.

34 years later, the Open Skies concept was reintroduced by U.S. President George H. W. Bush as a means to build confidence and security between all North Atlantic Treaty Organization (NATO) and Warsaw Pact countries. In February 1990, an international Open Skies conference involving all NATO and Warsaw Pact countries was held in Ottawa, Canada. Subsequent rounds of negotiations were held in Budapest, Hungary; Vienna, Austria; and Helsinki, Finland.

On 24 March 1992, the Open Skies Treaty was signed in Helsinki by U.S. Secretary of State James Baker and foreign ministers from 23 other countries. The treaty entered into force on 2 January 2002, after Russia and Belarus completed ratification procedures.

In November 1992, President George H. W. Bush assigned responsibility for overall training, management, leadership, coordination, and support for U.S. Open Skies observation missions to the On-Site Inspection Agency (OSIA), a part of the Defense Threat Reduction Agency (DTRA). Until entry into force in January 2002, DTRA support for the treaty involved participating in training and joint trial flights (JTFs). The U.S. has conducted over 70 JTFs since 1993. By March 2003, DTRA had successfully certified 16 camera configurations on the OC-135B aircraft. They also had contributed to the certification of the Bulgarian An-30, Hungarian An-26, SAMSON POD Group (see above) C-130H, Romanian An-30, Russian An-30, and Ukrainian An-30. The United States successfully flew its first Open Skies mission over Russia in December 2002.

Formal observation flights began in August 2002. During the first treaty year, state parties conducted 67 observation flights. In 2004, state parties conducted 74 missions, and planned 110 missions for 2005. On 8 and 9 March 2007, Russia conducted overflights of Canada under the Treaty. The OSCC continues to address modalities for conducting observation missions and other implementation issues.

Since 2002, a total of 40 missions have taken place over the U.K. There were 24 quota missions conducted by: Russia – 20; Ukraine – three; and Sweden – one. There were 16 training flights conducted by: Benelux (joint with Estonia); Estonia (joint with Benelux); Georgia – three (one joint with Sweden); Sweden – three (one joint with Georgia); U.S. – three; Latvia; Lithuania; Romania; Slovenia; and Yugoslavia. Also since 2002, the U.K. has undertaken a total of 51 open skies missions – 38 were quota missions to the following countries: Ukraine (five); Georgia (seven); and Russia (26); 13 missions were training missions to the following nations: Bulgaria; Yugoslavia; Estonia; Slovenia (three); Sweden (three); US; Latvia, Lithuania, and the Benelux. The flights cost approximately £50,000 per operational mission, and approximately £25,000 for training missions with an approximate annual cost of £175,000.

A Russian Defence Ministry spokesman stated on 4 February 2016 that Turkey had refused a Russian Open Skies mission, planned to take place on 1–5 February 2016, to fly over areas adjacent to Syria, as well as over NATO air bases. According to Russia, Turkey gave no explanation regarding the limitations, and claimed that they indicated illegal military activity in Syrian territory. The OSCC has not commented on the alleged violation of the Treaty by Turkey.

By 2016, Russian aircraft was using upgraded equipment for missions.

=== Challenges to the treaty ===
Both Russia and the United States alleged that the other was violating the provisions of the treaty. U.S. Secretary of State Mike Pompeo cited Russia's access refusal in the Russian-controlled areas of Georgia. On 20 September 2019, the U.S. and Canada were denied access to a military exercise in central Russia.

=== American withdrawal ===
In October 2019, documents from the U.S. House of Representatives indicated that President Donald Trump was considering withdrawing from the Open Skies Treaty. Ukraine was against the move, fearing it would enable Russia to reduce further or ban overflights, thus reducing their knowledge of Russian military movements.

In April 2020, it was reported that Secretary of State Mike Pompeo and Secretary of Defense Mark Esper had agreed to proceed with U.S. withdrawal from the Treaty on Open Skies. On 21 May 2020, President Trump announced that the United States would be withdrawing from the treaty due to alleged Russian violations.

On 22 May 2020, the United States submitted notice of withdrawal from the Treaty on Open Skies. Senate Democrats questioned the appropriateness of withdrawal so close to the 2020 United States presidential election.

On 22 November 2020, United States official sources—including U.S. Department of State websites, Secretary of State Mike Pompeo, and the National Security Council's official Twitter account—announced that the six-month period was over and the U.S. was no longer a party to the Treaty. The U.S. said it would share some of its intelligence and reconnaissance information with European allies to make up for any loss of critical information from the withdrawal.

=== Russian withdrawal ===
In January 2021, Russia announced that it would follow the United States in withdrawing from the Treaty on Open Skies. The Biden administration informed Moscow in May 2021 that it would not re-enter the pact; on 7 June 2021 Russian President Vladimir Putin signed a law that formalized Russia's exit from the Treaty on Open Skies.

== See also ==
- Freedoms of the air
- Treaty on Open Skies between Hungary and Romania
