= Wyandot =

Wyandot may refer to:

== Native American ethnography ==
- Wyandot people, who have been called Wyandotte and Huron
- Wendat people, also known as the Huron, indigenous people of Ontario which partially coalesced into the Wyandot people
- Wyandot language, an Iroquoian language
- Wyandotte Nation, a federally recognized Native American tribe in Oklahoma descended from the Wyandot people
- Wyandot Nation of Kansas, an unrecognized tribe and nonprofit organization headquartered in Kansas City, United States
- Wyandot of Anderdon Nation, an unrecognized tribe and nonprofit organization headquartered in Trenton, Michigan, United States

== Places ==
- Wyandot County, Ohio
  - Wyandot, Ohio, an unincorporated community in the above county
- Camp Wyandot, a Camp Fire Boys and Girls camp in Hocking Hills, Ohio
- Wyandot Point, a rock point west-southwest of Cape Tennyson on the north side of Ross Island in Antarctica
- Wyandot Ridge, a rocky ridge at the west side of Chattahoochee Glacier in Antarctica

== Other uses ==
- USS Wyandot, an Andromeda-class attack cargo ship
- Wyandot Snacks, a snack food manufacturer based in Marion, Ohio

== See also ==
- Wyandotte (disambiguation)
- Huron (disambiguation)
- Wendake
- Huron-Wendat Nation
