= Wyandotte =

Wyandotte may refer to:

== Native American ethnography ==
- Wyandotte people, also known as Wyandots and Hurons
- Wyandotte Nation, a federally recognized Native American tribe in Oklahoma descended from the Wyandot people
- Wyandot Nation of Kansas, a self-identifying tribe also descended from the Wyandot people in Kansas
- Wyandot of Anderdon Nation, a self-identifying tribe also descended from the Wyandot people in Michigan
- Wendat Nation of Wendake (Quebec), a Canadian First Nation descended from the Wendat people

== United States geographic names ==
- Wyandotte, Arkansas, an historical community in Hot Spring County, Arkansas
- Wyandotte, California, an unincorporated community in Butte County
- Wyandotte, Indiana, an unincorporated community in Crawford County
- Wyandotte, Kansas, a mid-19th-century settlement and neighborhood of Kansas City
- Wyandotte, Louisville, Kentucky, a neighborhood
- Wyandotte, Michigan, a city in Wayne County
- Wyandotte, Oklahoma, a town in Ottawa County
- Wyandotte Caves, park and its caverns in southern Indiana
- Wyandotte County, Kansas
- Wyandotte Township, Pennington County, Minnesota

== Other ==
- Wyandotté (novel), by James Fenimore Cooper
- Wyandotte chicken, a breed
- USS Wyandotte, two ships of the United States Navy
- Wyandotte Constitution of the US state of Kansas
- Brand of toys manufactured by the All Metal Products Company

== See also ==
- Huron (disambiguation)
- Wendake
- Wyandot (disambiguation)
