= Bertrand N. O. Walker =

American Indian writer (1870-1927)

B. N. O. Walker
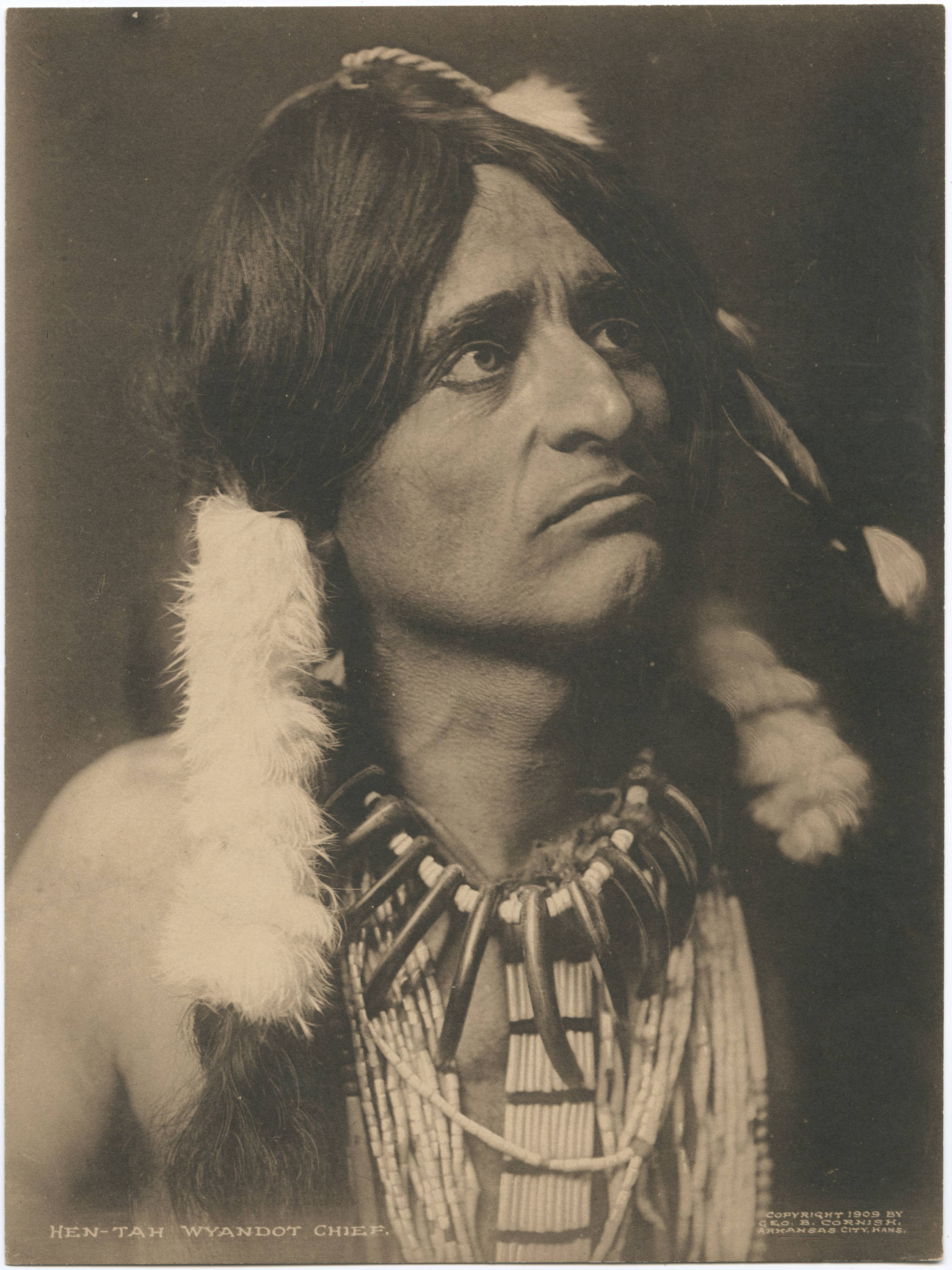
- Walker as Hen-Toh (1909)
- Born: Bertrand Nicholas Oliver Walker; 1870; Kansas City, Kansas
- Died: 1927 (aged 56–57)
- Other name: Hen-toh
- Occupations: Writer, clerk

Bertrand N. O. Walker (1870 – June 27, 1927), who published under his Wyandotte name Hen-Toh, was a Native American author of poetry and folktales best known for two books, Tales of the Bark Lodges (1919), and Yon-Doo-Shah-We-Ah (Nubbins) (1924).

== Biography ==
Walker was a citizen of the Wyandotte Nation was of the Big Turtle Clan. Born in Kansas City, Kansas, he was born around 1870, the youngest of eight children.

Walker was a great-nephew of William Walker Jr (1800 - 1874), the Wyandotte leader who served as the first provisional governor of Nebraska Territory, which also encompassed the present-day state of Kansas. Originally given another Wyandotte name, he adopted the name "Hen-Toh" (he leads), which was once borne by his Uncle by marriage, Chief John W. Greyeyes (1820 – 1881).

In 1872, his father Isaiah Walker (1826 - 1886) moved from Kansas to Indian Territory, building a house in what is now Wyandotte, Oklahoma, that is listed in the National Register. Walker attended a Friends’ Mission School near Wyandotte that was later renamed the Seneca Indian School. From 1890 until his death in 1927, he worked in the Indian Service, first as a teacher and then after 1901 as a clerk in Kansas, Oklahoma, California, and Arizona. Between 1918 and 1923 he focused on writing and maintaining the family farm. In 1923, he took a position with the Quapaw Agency in Miami, Oklahoma, serving there until his death.

== Writing ==
Walker read widely, and gathered folktales from older members of the Wyandotte, including his aunt Catherine "Kitty" Greyeyes (1822 - 1885), the wife of John W. Greyeyes. The Canadian ethnologist Charles Marius Barbeau credits Walker for facilitating his work on Huron and Wyandot Mythology (1915): "The author is much indebted to Mr. B. N. O. Walker not only for the valuable myths which he contributed ... but also for his many services in facilitating the work with other informants, by whom he is deservedly esteemed."

As Hen-Toh, Walker published two books, both issued by the Harlow Publishing Company in Oklahoma City. Tales of the Bark Lodges (1919), a collection of twelve stories, and Yon-Doo-Shah-We-Ah (Nubbins) (1924), a volume of poetry, chiefly character sketches and narratives. He also published in the Indian School Journal, Chronicles of Oklahoma, and other periodicals. Many of his folk-tales and poems are written in what he described as "the broken dialect peculiar alone to the 'old time Indian.'" As Daniel F. Littlefield and James W. Parins have noted, "Hen-Toh's close contact with old Wyandots had provided him a familiarity with not only Wyandot history and culture but also the rhythms of their English speech."

Despite his slim output Walker's work has been widely anthologized, most fully in Robert Dale Parker's collection of American Indian poetry published before 1930, Changing is not Vanishing (2010). In 2022, the proprietor of Carpe Librum, an antiquarian bookseller, discovered a substantial archive of unpublished manuscripts by Walker. According to the bookseller, the archive, which includes 30 poems and 20 stories, "more than doubles the known corpus of writings by B. N. O. Walker." The archive was sold to a research library.

== Critical reception ==
A number of scholars of Native American literature have drawn attention to Walker's work. One historian has called his writing "unabashedly romantic.” Another singled out for praise the “interesting character sketches and narratives” of Yon-Doo-Shah-We-Ah (Nubbins).

Calling Walker a "writer of exceptional talent whose works were never widely circulated." Daniel F. Littlefield and James W. Parins suggest that his stories are richly layered with meaning: "They are full of wit and humor and can be read simply for entertainment. Perceptive reader, however, will recognize the humor, which turns on the games of competition, trickery, and oneupsmanship played among the animals, as a vehicle for valuable lessons in such matters as etiquette, decorum, and mutual respect that formed a base of Wyandot society."

Robert Dale Parker finds parallels between Walker's work and the satirical work of the Creek humorist Alexander Posey (1873 – 1908), who published under the pseudonym “Fus Fixico,” setting them both in the larger literary context of regional humor. As he writes, “Posey and Hen-toh merged local Native English with the Old Southwestern and late nineteenth-century regionalist immersion in colloquial speech, most famously realized by Mark Twain, Finley Peter Dunne’s Mr. Dooley newspaper columns, and the poems of Paul Laurence Dunbar, all antecedents of the modernist preoccupation with literary perspective.”

== In popular culture ==
- The photograph by George Bancroft Cornish titled "Hen-Tah, Wyandot Chief" is a portrait of Walker in 1909. Cornish, who specialized in images of Native Americans and the West, misspelled Walker's name ("Hen-Tah" instead of "Hen-Toh"), and misidentified him as a chief. Another portrait by Cornish, probably taken at the same sitting, appears as the frontispiece to the original edition of Yon-Doo-Shah-We-Ah.
- A portrait of Walker by Acee Blue Eagle (1907-1959) appears in the set of Famous Oklahoma Indians glassware produced by the Knox Oil Company in 1959.
- A story by B. N. O. Walker was adapted in comic form as "A Prehistoric Race," with a script by Tom Pomplum and art by Tara Audibert.
