= John Steckley =

Canadian scholar (born 1949)

- Born: John L. Steckley; March 13, 1949 (age 77)
- Other name: Wyandot: Tehaondechoren Wendat: Hechon
- Occupation: Scholar

Academic background
- Education: University of Toronto (PhD)

John L. Steckley (born March 13, 1949) is a Canadian scholar specializing in Native American studies and the Indigenous languages of the Americas. Steckley has a PhD in Education from the University of Toronto. He taught at Humber College in Toronto, Ontario, from 1983 until his retirement in June 2015.

Steckley is one of the last known speakers of the Wyandot language, which he has studied for over thirty years. Today he works closely with the Wyandotte Nation of Oklahoma to aid in language revitalization alongside other linguists of Wyandot such as Richard Zane Smith from the unrecognized Wyandot Nation of Kansas and Dr. Craig Kopris. He is also interested in place names as derived from indigenous languages, and aims to correct common misconceptions regarding their original derivations.

Steckley has become a deeply respected figure amongst the Wyandot. On his adoption into the Wyandot tribe in 1999, he was named Tehaondechoren ("he who splits the country in two"). He was also given the name "Hechon" by descendants of the Wendat people in Wendake, Quebec, while teaching them their own historical language. This was a name that had previously been given to Jean de Brébeuf (1593–1649), one of the North American Martyrs, by his Wendat followers.

His 2007, Huron-English Dictionary was the first book of its type for over 250 years to be published.

In 2007, Laval University received a federal grant of $1 million for development of its Huron-language teaching materials in collaboration with Steckley.

Steckley has written widely on a variety of sociological and anthropological topics, including a recent book on gibbons.

== Bibliography ==
- "Untold Tales: Four 17th Century Huron" (1992)
- Full Circle: Canada's First Nations (2001)
- Aboriginal Voices and the Politics of Representation in Canadian Introductory Sociology Textbooks (2003)
- "De Religione: Telling the Seventeenth Century Jesuit Story in Huron to the Iroquois" (2004)
- A Huron-English / English-Huron Dictionary, Listing Both Nouns and Verb Roots (2007)
- "Words of the Huron" (2007)
- Elements of Sociology: A Critical Canadian Introduction (with Guy Letts) (2008)
- "White Lies About the Inuit" (2008)
- "Gabriel Sagard's Dictionary of Huron
- Beyond Their Years: Five Native Women's Stories (2011)
- "Introduction to Physical Anthropology" (2011)
- Learning from the Past: Five Cases of Aboriginal Justice (2013)
- Foundations of Sociology (2014)
- The Eighteenth-Century Wyandot: A Clan-Based Study (2014)
- Gibbons: The Invisible Apes (2015)
- "Instructions to a Dying Infidel" (2015)
- "Indian Agents: Rulers of the Reserves" (2016)
- "The Problem of Translating Catholic Doctrine into the Language of an Indigenous Horticultural Tribe" (2017)
- "Parrots: The Flock Among Us" (2017)
- "Unlikely Heroes and Improbable Means" (2017)
- "Brebeuf's 1630 Catechism of the Wendat/Huron (2017)
- "The Memoirs of Alexander Brodie" (2019)
- "Forty Narratives in the Wyandot Language" (2020)
- "The Wyandot Language and Structure" (2021)
- "Names of the Wyandot" (2022)
- "Stories for Mia" (2023)
