= Wyandott =

Wyandott may refer to:

- Wyandot (disambiguation)
- Wyandotte (disambiguation)
