= Wendat Nation =

First Nation in Quebec, Canada

- First Nation
- Nation Wendat - Wendake
- Former Badge of the Wendat Nation
- Interactive map of Wendat Nation
- Established: Huron-British Treaty of 1760

Government
  - Type: Wendat Nation Council
  - Grand Chief: Pierre Picard
  - Family Chiefs: Dave Laveau, Denis Bastien, Carlo Gros-Louis, René W. Picard, Stéphane Picard, Daniel Sioui, William Romain, Jean-Mathieu Sioui

Population (May 2022)
  - Total: 4,605
- Time zone: EDT DST
- Website: wendake.ca

The Wendat Nation (or Huron-Wendat First Nation) is an Indigenous First Nation of Wendat people in Quebec, established in the 17th century. Their Wendat language is a Northern Iroquoian language, and they primarily speak French. The First Nation now has two communities and Indian reserves, Wendake 7 and Wendake 7A, at Wendake, within Quebec City in Canada.

The nation's historical territory was between Lake Simcoe and Georgian Bay, known as Wendake (Huronia). The 17th-century Beaver Wars drove surviving Wendats east to Quebec, under French protection.

== Name ==
In the French language, used by most members of the First Nation, they are known as the Nation Wendat. The French gave the nickname Huron to the Wendat (from the French word hure, meaning "boar's head") because of the hairstyle of Huron men, who had their hair standing in bristles on their heads. Wendat (Quendat) was their confederacy name, meaning 'people of the island' or 'dwellers on a peninsula'.

== Territory ==
The Wendat Nation have two urban reserves in Quebec City, Quebec: Wendake 7 and Wendake 7A.

The 1760 Huron–British North American Peace Treaty, lost in 1824 but rediscovered in the 1990s, showed that a large chunk of land named Seigneurie de Sillery (now part of Quebec City) was sold to the Wendat in 1760 by the Jesuits. Therefore, the Wendats have a contemporary claim to this valuable land.

== History ==
In the late 16th century, the Wendat Confederacy was formed to defend against their common enemy, the Haudenosaunee Confederacy. The Wendat Confederacy consisted of four allied nations, including Attinniaoenten (Bear), Atingeennonniahak (Cords), Arendaenronnon (Rock), Atahontaenrat (Deer) and Ataronchronon (Bog). However, the last group, Ataronchronon (Bog) may have been a division of the Attinniaoenten (Bear) since they may have not attained full membership.

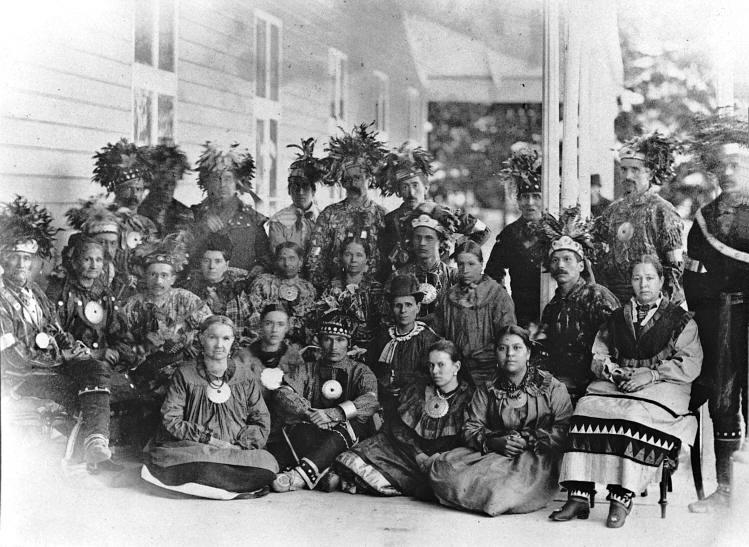
Wendat group from Wendake (Lorette) at Spencer Wood, Quebec City, 1880

Due to diseases introduced by the Europeans and a lack of firearms, from 1648 to 1650, the Wendat Confederacy was defeated by the Haudenosaunee. Following their defeat, many Wendat refugees were adopted by the neighbouring Tionontati, with this combined nation becoming the Wyandot people. Other Wendat fled to Quebec under French protection, where they became the modern Wendat Nation.

On August 27, 1999, the Wendat Confederacy was reaffirmed by signing a document with their mothers blood: The Wyandotte Nation of Oklahoma (United States), Wyandot Nation of Kansas (United States), the Wyandot of Anderdon Nation (Michigan, United States) and the Wendat Nation (Quebec, Canada).

== Government ==
Village, tribe, and confederacy made up the basic level of government system in the Wendat Nation. At the village level, there were several chiefs to represent different clans, and each chief had different status (e.g.: civil or war chief). Most of their status were inherited, but they could fight for that or being appointed by older women of the lineage. The chief organized a council meeting to discuss about current issues within the village, and men and women were welcomed to give opinions. The meeting for the Wendat Confederacy happened once a year.

Jesuit Father Lallemant, noted of the Wendat in 1644:

"I do not believe that there is any people on earth freer than they, and less able to allow the subjection of their wills to any power whatever – so much so that Fathers here have no control over their children, or Captains over their subjects, or the Laws of the country over any of them, except in so far as each is pleased to submit to them. There is no punishment which is inflicted on the guilty, and no criminal who is not sure that his life and property are in no danger"

== Social organization ==
The Wendats are a matrilineal society in which status and property are inherited through the women's line. Property, clan membership and position could potentially be passed down.

=== Clan system ===
Similar to other Iroquois nations, Wendat society uses a matrilineal clan system which has clans named after certain animals. There are eight matrilineal clans: Turtle, Wolf, Bear, Beaver, Deer, Hawk, Porcupine, and Snake. In order to unify, each person in each clan, no matter their nation or village, was seen as related. Thus, people would have to marry a person outside of their clan.

== Economy ==
Today, cultural tourism is the main economic driver, and includes a developed historic sector, a residential district, and an industrial zone. As of April 2022, registered members of the Wendat Nation in Wendake, Quebec consists of 4,578 members.

About 70% of the area north and west of Lake Simcoe and south and east of Georgian Bay, where the Wendat nation occupied, was agricultural land. Because of this, historically most Wendat were farmers, and their economy was based on horticulture by growing maize, beans, and squash.

The Wendat lived in Ontario near the northern limit of where agriculture was feasible and had less fertile soils than many other regions to the south and west. Nevertheless, with polyculture (practiced predominantly with the Three Sisters), they produced surpluses for trading with nearby non-agricultural peoples.

As Indigenous peoples of the Northeastern Woodlands did not historically plow their land, a team of scholars (Mt. Pleasant and Burt) concluded that their lands retained more organic matter and thus were higher in yields of maize than early Euro-American farms in North America.

== Culture ==
=== Language ===
The Wendat language, spoken by the Wendat people, is considered extinct. The language was closely related to the Iroquois languages of the Haudenosaunee.

Around the second half of the 19th century, Wendat died out because there were no living speakers. However, in the 1970s and 1980s, attempts were being made to revive the dormant language by using historical dictionaries and manuscripts from Recollet and Jesuit missionaries. In 2010, the Wendat Community of Quebec and the Wyandot Nation of Oklahoma have been teaching Wendat and the related Wyandot to their community members, respectively.

=== Housing ===
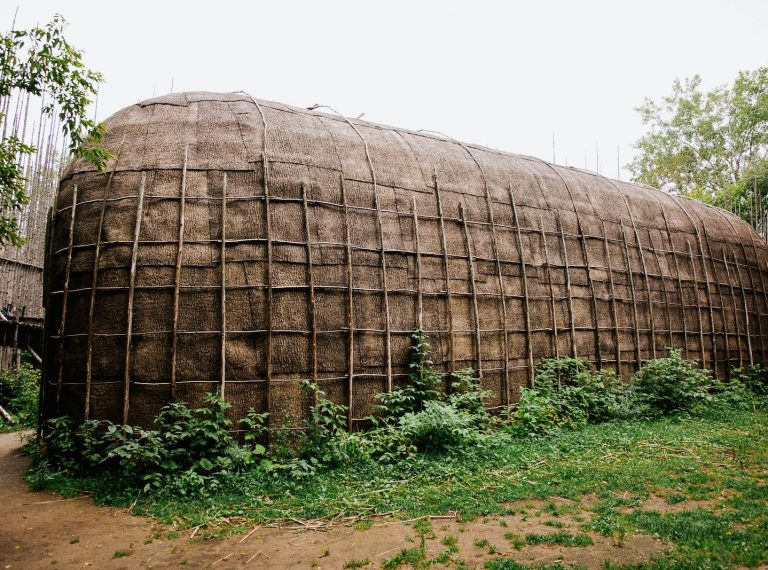
Longhouse

Historically, the Wendat dwelt in longhouses that had a rectangular shape with rounded roofs that were covered by bark panels. These houses were built to serve as homes for extended families.

=== Artifacts ===
Wendat societies were village-based and to support their farming efforts, produced utilitarian ceramics that served functional purposes within their lifestyles, while also featuring aesthetic considerations relating to their design and form. Traditional crafts of the Wendat community continued in 19th century Quebec, despite colonization. The practices included canoe building, embroidery, basketry, and snowshoe making.

=== Clothing ===
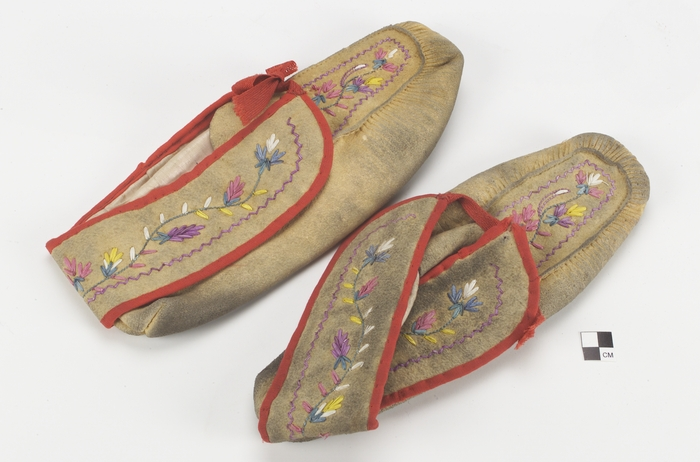
Embroidered Wendat moccasins

Historically, Wendat clothing was mostly made from deer and beaver hides. Their clothes were very decorative by using porcupine quills, feathers, and wampum, and red was the most favourite colour in their culture.

Men wore loincloths and moccasins on their feet, and in the winter, they wore sleeves and a cloak made of fur. On their backs, they wore fire pouches, also called bandolier bags, so that they could carry tobacco pipes, charms, and personal belongings. Wendat men tended to smoke, so it was common for them to carry a pipe. Women wore the same thing as men, but instead of loincloths, they wore skirts.

== Demographics ==
As of April 2022, the number of registered citizens of the Wendat Nation in Wendake, Quebec consists of 4,578 people.

Before the 16th century, the Wendat population was approximately 20,000 to 25,000 people. However, Europeans introduced new diseases, such as measles, influenza, and smallpox, beginning in 1634 to 1642, which reduced the Wendat population significantly to about 9,000 people.

== See also ==
- Wendake - Two urban reserves of the Wendat Nation
- Wendat people
- Wyandot (disambiguation)
- Wyandotte (disambiguation)
- Huron (disambiguation)
- Kondiaronk
