= Richard Zane Smith =

Richard Zane Smith (born 1955) is an American sculptor who grew up in St. Louis Missouri and learned the art of pottery at the Kansas City Art institute. Smith's works draw from Wyandotte as well as Pueblo traditions, incorporating coils and layers within the clay. Smith utilizes the influences of many Southwestern pottery styles, including the Pueblos and the Ancestral Pueblo people.

The Wyandotte Nation tribal council has named Smith as a designated tribal artisan, as defined in the Indian Arts and Crafts Act.

== Personal life ==
Smith was born in 1955 in Augusta, Georgia and grew up in and near St. Louis, Missouri. Smith specialized in ceramics when he attended the Kansas City Art Institute. Smith was introduced to art at a young age. He and his four siblings would gather around and listen to many stories told by their parents throughout their childhood. Smith found an interest in clay during his high school years. In addition to clay, Smith would work with many natural materials, such as wood, leather, and stone, and the main media for his art was clay. During these same years, Smith also formed an interest in Wyandot culture.

Smith is involved in the revival of the Wyandot language. Having gone into disuse in the 1960s, Smith began studying and teaching the language to Wyandotte people and descendants. He is a member of the Wyandot Nation of Kansas, a Wyandot heritage organization.

== Cultural inspiration ==
In 1978, Smith traveled to Arizona where he worked as an art instructor at a Navajo mission school. This was his first contact with Native clays and Ancestral Pueblo potsherds and fragments. He incorporated such ideas into his works and bore a new style of pottery. Smith's pottery draws inspiration from precontact corrugated pottery (pottery where the coils made to form the shape of the pot are left exposed and are rough textured) from the Southwest as well as resembling historic Wyandot basketry. Smith stands out for moving from Southwest-style pottery to exploring Wyandot styles of pottery.

== Select artworks ==
- “Op-Art” Geometric Design Jar (2000)
- Corrugated Bowl with Wood/Rock Handle (2005)
- Garden Set of 6 Pieces (2001)
- Bury my Heart at Auschwitz (1995)
- Bear Baiting an Indian (2017)

== Exhibitions ==
- Native American Art, Philbrook Museum of Art
- The American Craft Museum International Tour
- The American Craft Museum
- Denver Art Museum
- "Breaking the Surface", Heard Museum
- San Diego Museum of Man

== Public collections ==
- American Craft Museum
- Philbrook Museum of Art
- Denver Art Museum

== Honors and awards ==
- "Best of Pottery Award", Heard Museum's Annual American Art juried Competition
- 2010 "Community Spirit Award", First Peoples Fund

Richard Zane Smith no longer participates in competitions against other artists.

== See also ==
- Wyandot language
