= Pierre de Lagrené =

Missionary in New France

Pierre de Lagrené (or Pierre Lagrené) (1659, Paris—November 24, 1736, Quebec) was a missionary in New France.

He entered the Society of Jesus at Paris in October 1677 and studied philosophy at the Jesuit college of La Flèche (1679–81). After teaching Latin, classics, and rhetoric for five years at the college in Hesdin and rhetoric for two years at the college in Eu, Normandy, he was ordained a priest (1693). In 1694 he was sent to the Canada mission. After a short stay at Lorette, spent in the study of the Huron language, he was stationed (1697-1701) at Sault St. Louis (Caughnawaga) with the Iroquois. He then returned to Lorette for a year. In 1704 he was back at Sault St. Louis, where he remained until transferred to Montreal in 1707, of which residence he was named superior in 1716. This position he still occupied in 1720.

During the last eleven years of his stay in Montreal, besides his spiritual ministrations to the transient bands of Indians and the ordinary ministry of the Church, he was director of the Montreal Congrégation des Hommes de Ville-Marie, then in its infancy, which brought together the elite of Montreal society. This sodality, affiliated to the Roman (May 3, 1693) by the General of the Society of Jesus, under the title of the Assumption of Our Lady, passed into the hands of the priests of the Society of Saint-Sulpice, when the last Jesuit at Montreal, Father Bernard Well, died in 1791. On August 10, 1710, Lagrené had the satisfaction of seeing the completion of the sodality chapel, commenced May 24, 1709, and in taking part in the ceremony of its blessing with the then local superior, Father François-Vaillant de Gueslis.

In 1723 Father Lagrené was transferred to Quebec College, there to be prefect of schools. He filled this position until 1735, but other responsibilities were added. Minister in 1724–25, he became director of the sodality in 1730. In 1735 his increasing infirmities incapacitated him for further work. He died at the College of Quebec the following year.
