= Petun =

North American ethnic group

Pétun
Tionontati
- Map of the Petun Country superimposed on modern administrative boundaries

Total population
- Extinct as a tribe after the mid-17th century, merged into Wyandot people

Regions with significant populations
- Ontario

Languages
- Petun (Iroquoian)

Religion
- Indigenous religion

Related ethnic groups
- Wendat, Wyandot, Wenrohronon, Neutral, Erie, other Iroquoian peoples

The Petun (from French: pétun), also known as the Tobacco people or Tionontati (Dionnontate, Etionontate, Etionnontateronnon, Tuinontatek, Dionondadie, or Khionotaterrhonon) ("The people of the place where the mountain stands"), were an indigenous Iroquoian people of the woodlands of eastern North America. Their traditional homeland was south of Lake Huron's Georgian Bay, in what is today's Canadian province of Ontario.

The Petun were closely related to the Wendat, or Huron. Similar to other Iroquoian peoples, they were structured as a confederacy. One of the less numerous Iroquoian peoples when they became known to Europeans, they had eight or nine villages in the early 17th century, and are estimated to have numbered around 8,000 before European contact.

A number of epidemics were documented in Huron–Petun societies between 1634 and 1640, which have been linked to the arrival of French missionaries and traders. The epidemics decimated their population. Although they each spoke Iroquoian languages, they were independent of the Five Nations of the Haudenosaunee Confederacy (Iroquois), based south of the Great Lakes in present-day New York State. The powerful Haudenosaunee sent raiding parties against the smaller tribes in 1648–1649 as part of the Beaver Wars associated with the lucrative fur trade, and virtually destroyed them. The surviving Petun joined with refugee Wendat (Hurons) and Wenrohronon to become the Wyandot.

== Names ==
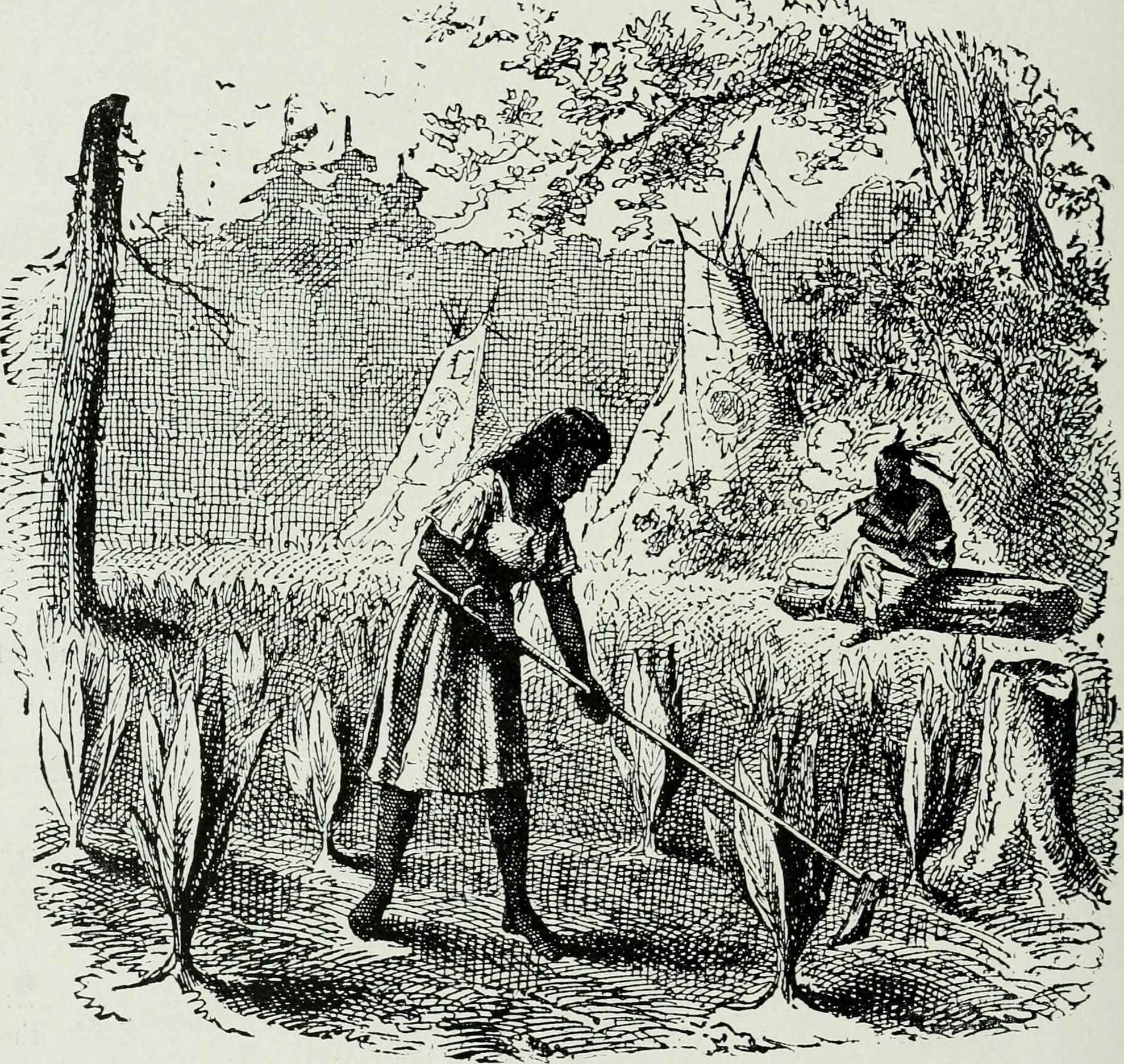
1914 illustration depicting the artist's concept of a Petun woman cultivating tobacco

The term "Pétun" was derived from the early French-Brazilian trade and comes from the Tupi indigenous language. The word later became obsolete in the French language.

Numerous sources connect the name, Petun, to the cultivation and trade of tobacco by the historical Iroquoian society that existed at the time of the arrival of Europeans. For example, a 19th-century American translation by John Gilmary Shea of the History and General Description of New France, written by the late 17th and early 18th century French Jesuit historian Pierre François Xavier de Charlevoix, notes that they "raised and sold tobacco, whence the French called them Petuns or Peteneux." This widespread claim was later echoed by other sources such as the Smithsonian Institution's Handbook of American Indians North of Mexico in 1910, which referenced "large fields of tobacco." Later encyclopedias, such as the 1998 Gale Encyclopedia of Native American Tribes and the 2001 Columbia Guide to American Indians of the Northeast also emphasize tobacco cultivation and trade as an explanation for the French nickname, "pétun".

Despite this, no contemporary French accounts mention tobacco cultivation at Petun settlements. The nickname was originally used by Samuel de Champlain for a particular village he visited during his 1616 expedition. Wider usage of the term can be traced to the Récollet brother Gabriel Sagard in 1623. One of the earliest traceable claims for notable tobacco production by the Petun is in the table of notes accompanying a 1632 map attributed to Champlain, but which was not wholly his creation. The table has significant differences from Champlain's earlier work; in his 1619 text, he notes that the Petun grew corn, but did not mention tobacco, whereas the 1632 table explicitly mentions cultivation and trade of tobacco.

In the Iroquoian Mohawk language, the name for tobacco is O-ye-aug-wa. French colonial traders in the Ohio Valley transliterated the Mohawk name as Guyandotte, their spelling of how it sounded in their language. Later European-American settlers in the valley adopted this name. They named the Guyandotte River in south-western West Virginia for the Wyandot people, who had migrated to the area during the Beaver Wars of the late seventeenth century.

== History ==
=== Historical sources ===
There are few historical primary sources which focus on the Petun before their dispersal. The main contemporary written source for the era, the Jesuit Relations, was written from the perspective of the predominantly French Jesuit missionaries in Huronia (located across Nottawasaga Bay from the Petun Country). The missionaries' information on the Petun was often second-hand. Additionally, English translations of French sources historically suffered from inconsistency due to translators' preference or bias.

Compounding the issue, early sources did not clearly distinguish between the Wendat, Petun, and Neutral confederacies. The Petun were sometimes grouped with the Wendat, and at other times unrelated peoples, such as the Cayuga, were called "Petun".

=== Precontact ===
The Petun emerged during the Late Ceramic archaeological period, which began around 1,100 years ago and ended around 400 years ago. They are grouped with the Wendat and Neutral peoples as part of the Ontario Iroquois tradition. The Ontario Iroquoians, St. Lawrence Iroquoians, and the Haudenosaunee of what is now upstate New York are sometimes grouped together as Northern Iroquoians. The Late Ceramic is characterized by its longhouse-based fortified settlements, which were often enclosed by palisades. The early Ontario Iroquoian tradition is further split into two regional groupings: the Glen Meyer to the south (associated with the north shore of Lake Erie) and the Pickering to the north, which covered the area between Lake Ontario and Georgian Bay. At some point around 700 years ago, the Pickering culture spread across most of what is now southern Ontario. J. V. Wright, who in the mid- and late 20th century wrote extensively on the prehistory of Ontario, attributes this to warfare, with the Pickering dispersing and assimilating the Glen Meyer. There is no evidence of widespread warfare, however, which casts doubt on this hypothesis.

Throughout the Late Ceramic period, agriculture became more important, while the importance of hunting decreased. Corn was first introduced to the area during the Early Ceramic period (3000–1100 BP) and coincides with the rise of the Princess Point culture, which is generally agreed by archaeologists to be ancestral to Iroquoians, even as it shows discontinuity with previous archaeological cultures in the area and possibly represents a movement of Iroquoian peoples to the area from the south. The lavish grave goods which appeared in the Early Ceramic, often made from imported materials, underscored a Late Ceramic development of more elaborate funerary practices, which included secondary burials and the use of ossuaries.

Immediately before contact with Europeans, later Ontario Iroquoians had developed into two separate cultural groupings: the Huron–Petun to the north, and the Neutrals and their close relatives, the Erie, to the south. Populations became more centralized around large, well-fortified village sites.The Huron–Petun and Neutrals both retreated to core areas: the Wendat around their "homeland" territory near Georgian Bay, and the Neutrals in the Niagara Peninsula.

=== Arrival of Europeans ===
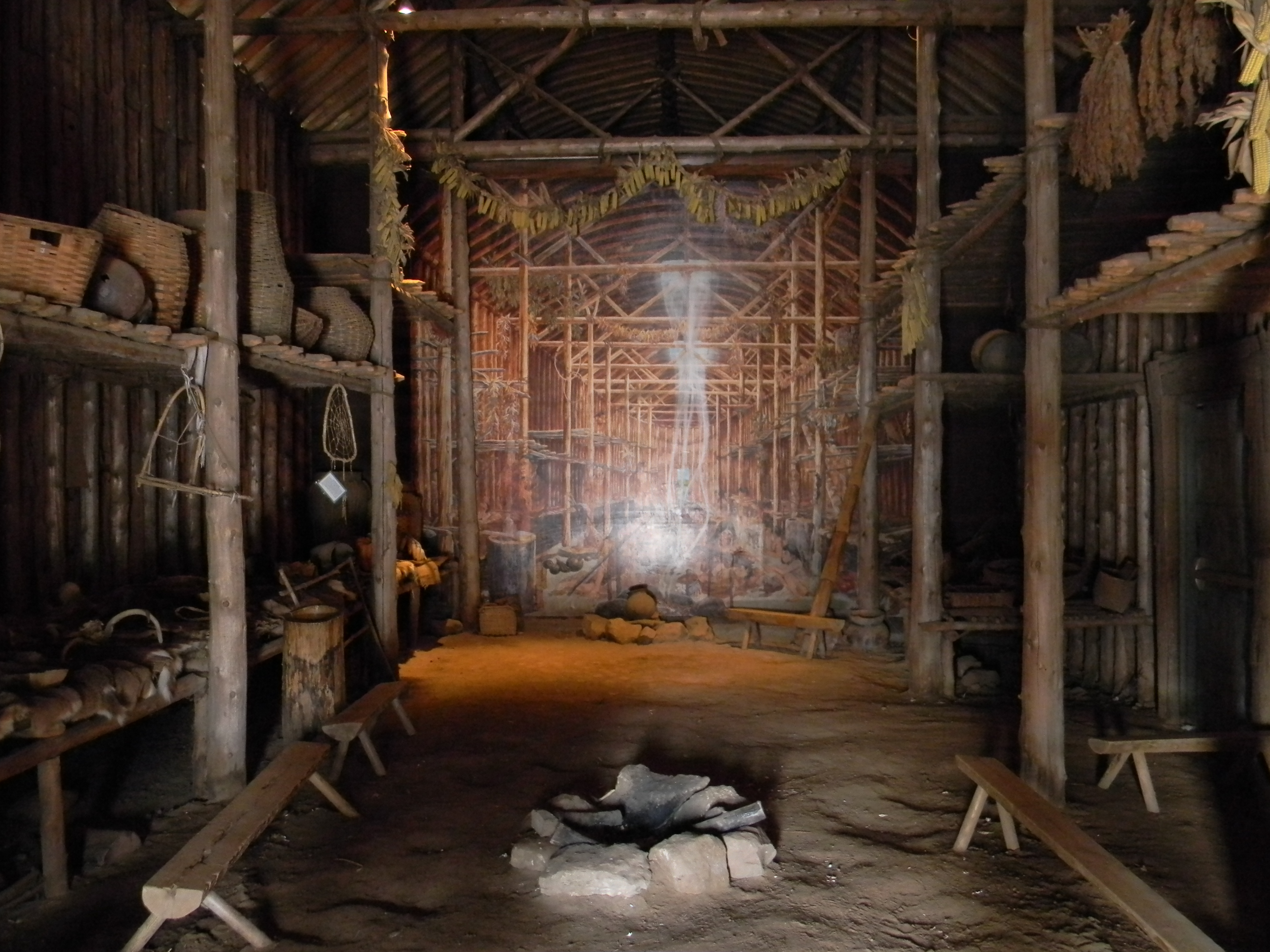
Interior of a longhouse, near Toronto

The arrival of the French in the area by the early 17th century allowed for a brief period of extensive written records about the Wendat, Petun, and Neutrals. By this point, the Wendat and Petun were politically separate, though their customs were considered similar by the French. Jesuit missionaries noted that while they were closely allied, they had previously fought bitter wars with each other. The Wendat were living to the northeast of the Petun, in a territory lying between Georgian Bay and Lake Simcoe. Trails linked the Wendat and the Petun, with about a day's journey between them. In 1616, Samuel de Champlain listed about eight Petun villages, while later Jesuit accounts in 1639 listed nine. One modern estimate places the Petun population at around 8000, dropping to 3000 by 1640 following waves of disease epidemics. In comparison, there were an estimated 18–25 Wendat villages with an overall population of 20,000–30,000; this had dropped to about 9000 by 1640. Modern scholarly analysis finds no evidence of large-scale mass death or depopulation events immediately preceding this epidemic wave, implying that populations had remained relatively consistent before this despite migrations.

Politically, the Petun were a tribal confederacy, similarly to the Wendat. The Petun were composed of two sub-groups which the Jesuits termed the "Nation of the Wolves" and the "Nation of the Deer".

=== Beaver Wars ===
The fur trade and the French presence in the area ushered in change for Petun society. The French dealt with the Wendat as their primary trading partner, which blocked direct access by the Petun and others to valuable European trade goods. With the French seeking beaver pelts, the beaver was soon virtually extinct in Huronia itself, and the Wendat were forced to turn to others, such as the Algonquin, for furs. The Haudenosaunee to the south, meanwhile, were beginning their campaign of expansionism which would become known as the Beaver Wars. The Dutch, well-established in their New Netherland colony and trading up the Hudson and Delaware rivers, were also desirous of furs and were willing to supply the Haudenosaunee with European firearms. In contrast, the French strictly controlled access to firearms, and only supplied trusted Christian converts among the Wendat. Epidemics and conflict with the Haudenosaunee in the east had driven many Wendat to seek refuge at the French mission of Sainte-Marie among the Hurons (near modern-day Midland, Ontario) and to convert to Christianity.

In 1648, the Haudenosaunee raided and destroyed a number of eastern Wendat villages. That winter, a thousand-strong Haudenosaunee army of mostly Seneca and Mohawk warriors secretly camped north of Lake Ontario, and in the spring they were unleashed on the Wendat. The Haudenosaunee overran the western Wendat villages around Sainte-Marie; the French burned Sainte-Marie to avoid its capture by the Haudenosaunee, then ultimately retreated from the Pays d'en Haut to the safety of Quebec. The Wendat themselves dispersed in defeat, with some following the French to Quebec (settling at Wendake), while others took refuge among the Neutrals and the Petun.

By the end of 1649, however, the Haudenosaunee had turned on the Petun as well.The Haudenosaunee wiped out the bulk of the Petun, with the survivors dispersing and assimilating into other tribes for survival. Many Wendat and Petun were then absorbed into Haudenosaunee society. However, a large group of Wendat and Petun refugees fled to the upper Great Lakes, where they took refuge with the Odawa and Potawatomi. The bulk of them at first stayed with the Odawa on Manitoulin Island, then occupied the Michilimackinac–Green Bay area, before eventually migrating to the area near modern-day Detroit and by 1701 arriving at the southwest shore of Lake Erie.

=== Later migrations ===
Coalescing into a single people, the Petun-Wendat began to trade in present-day Pennsylvania, where they were called the Wyandot, a corruption of Wendat. Under settler pressure, the Wyandot were forced to move further west to Ohio Country.

In the 1830s during the period of Indian Removal, most removed to the Indian Territory in present-day Kansas and Oklahoma. In 1843, they were all resettled in Wyandotte County, Kansas and in 1867, the American government promised them land in Indian Territory, now northeastern Oklahoma. However, the land did not exist and the other relocated tribes of the area would sell land to the Wyandot. Wyandot people organized the federally recognized tribe, the Wyandotte Nation, headquartered in northeastern Oklahoma. Other descendants formed the unrecognized Wyandot Nation of Kansas.

The Wyandotte Nation self-identifies as being primarily descended from the Petun, with mixed Wendat and Wenro ancestry.

== Culture ==
The Jesuit Relations in 1652 describes the practice of tattooing among the Petun and the Neutrals:

And this (tattooing) in some nations is so common that in the one which we called the Tobacco, and in that which – on account of enjoying peace with the Wendat and with the Iroquois – was called Neutral, I know not whether a single individual was found, who was not painted in this manner, on some part of the body.

The Petun nation shared a similar dialect with the Wendat Nation and many of the same cultural customs. They had an alliance with the Neutral Nation southwest and south of the, and with the Odawa, an Algonquian-speaking nation to the east. They also shared elements of material culture with the Odawa, as a disc pipe of similar type to ones found at Odawa sites was also found at a Petun site dated to 1630–47.
