= Leaford Bearskin =

Native American tribal leader and US Air Force officer

Chief of the Wyandotte Nation
- In office September 1983 – May 31, 2011

Personal details
- Born: September 11, 1921 Wyandotte, Oklahoma, U.S.
- Died: November 9, 2012 (aged 91) Wyandotte, Oklahoma, U.S.
- Awards: Distinguished Flying Cross; Air Medal

Military service
- Allegiance: United States
- Branch/service: United States Army Air Forces; United States Air Force
- Years of service: 1939–1960
- Rank: Lieutenant Colonel
- Unit: 90th Bombardment Group; Strategic Air Command; Fifteenth Air Force
- Battles/wars: World War II; Berlin Airlift; Korean War

Leaford Bearskin (September 11, 1921 – November 9, 2012) was a Native American tribal leader and US Air Force officer. He was Chief of the Wyandotte Nation from 1983 to 2011.

== Military service ==
During the Second World War, Captain Bearskin was the commander of a B-24 Liberator bomber, operating in the Pacific. In 1948 he assisted in the Berlin Airlift as a squadron commander. During the Korean War he again served as a squadron commander. In 1960 Bearskin retired from the service with the rank of lieutenant colonel. Amongst his many honors and citations were the Distinguished Flying Cross and the Medal for Humane Action.

=== Military awards ===
- Command Pilot Insignia
- Distinguished Flying Cross
- Air Medal
- Air Force Commendation Medal
- Presidential Unit Citation
- Air Force Outstanding Unit Award
- American Defense Service Medal with star
- American Campaign Medal
- Asiatic-Pacific Campaign Medal with four campaign stars
- World War II Victory Medal
- Army of Occupation Medal with Berlin Airlift device
- Medal for Humane Action
- National Defense Service Medal
- Korean Service Medal
- Air Force Longevity Service Ribbon with four oak leaf clusters
- Korean Presidential Unit Citation
- United Nations Korea Medal
- Korean War Service Medal

== Chief of the Wyandotte Nation ==
In September 1983, Bearskin was elected Chief of the Wyandotte Nation. He served as Chief for 29 years, until his death in 2012.

The new Chief, Bill Friend, said of his predecessor: "His influence has not only been felt by our Nation, but throughout the state of Oklahoma and across the United States. He was a loyal and fierce advocate of tribal sovereignty and rights for not only the Wyandotte Nation, but for all tribes across this great nation."
