= Wyandot language =

Iroquoian language

Wyandot
- Waⁿdát
- Pronunciation: [wa.ndát]
- Native to: Canada, United States
- Region: Northeastern Oklahoma, Quebec; recently near Sandwich, Ontario, and Wyandotte, Oklahoma
- Ethnicity: Wyandot people
- Extinct: 1972
- Revival: Oklahoma and Quebec have limited language programs (2007)
- Language family: Iroquoian: Northern; Lake Iroquoian; Huronian; Wyandot
- Early form: Wendat
- Writing system: Latin script

Language codes
- ISO 639-3: Either: wyn – Wyandot wdt – Wendat
- Glottolog: wyan1247
- Huron Wyandot is classified as Critically Endangered by the UNESCO Atlas of the World's Languages in Danger.

A Wyandot speaker, recorded in the United States

Wyandot (Waⁿdát, also Wendat, Wyandotte, Quendat or Huron) is the Iroquoian language traditionally spoken by the people known as Wyandot or Wyandotte, descended from the Tionontati. It is considered a sister to the Wendat language, spoken by descendants of the Huron-Wendat Confederacy. It was last spoken, before its revival, by members located primarily in Oklahoma, United States, and Ontario, Canada. Linguists have traditionally considered Wyandot as a dialect or modern form of Wendat, even though the two are no longer mutually intelligible.

Wyandot essentially died out as a spoken language with the death of the last native speaker in 1972, though there are now attempts at revitalization:

- The Wyandotte Nation is offering Wyandot language classes in the Wyandotte Public Schools grades K–4, at the Wyandotte Nation's preschool "Turtle-Tots" program in Oklahoma and has created online language lessons for self-study.
- The Wendat Nation of Quebec is offering adult and children's classes in the Wendat language at its village school in Wendake.

== History ==
=== Relationship to Wendat ===
Although linguists have equated it with or seen it as a dialect of the Iroquoian Wendat (Huron), Wyandot can be regarded as distinct enough to be considered its own language. Wyandot's divergence from Wendat appears to have occurred sometime between the mid-18th century, when the Jesuit missionary Pierre Potier (1708–1781) documented the Petun dialect of Wendat in Canada, and the mid-nineteenth century. By the time the ethnographer Marius Barbeau made his transcriptions of the Wyandot language in Wyandotte, Oklahoma, in 1911–1912, it had diverged enough to be considered a separate language.

Significant differences between Wendat and Wyandot in diachronic phonology, pronominal prefixes, and lexicon challenge the traditional view that Wyandot is modern Wendat. History suggests the roots of this language are complex; the ancestors of the Wyandot were refugees from various Huronian tribes who banded together to form one tribe. After being displaced from their ancestral home in Canada on Georgian Bay, the group traveled south, first to Ohio and later to Kansas and Oklahoma. As many members of this group were Petun, some scholars have suggested that Wyandot is more influenced by Petun than by its descent from Wendat.

The work of Barbeau was used by linguist Craig Kopris to reconstruct Wyandot; he developed a grammar and dictionary of the language. This work represents the most comprehensive research done on the Wyandot language as spoken in Oklahoma just prior to its extinction (or its dormancy as modern tribal members refer to it).

== Phonology ==
=== Consonants ===
The phonemic inventory of the consonants is written by using the orthography used by Kopris in his analysis, which was based on Barbeau's transcriptions. The orthographic symbol is written in angled brackets. Kopris listed places of articulation for the consonants but noted that the distinction had not been made by Barbeau.

	Labial	Alveolar		Post- alveolar		Palatal	Velar	Glottal
Nasal	(m ⟨m⟩)	n ⟨n⟩						
Plosive		t ⟨t⟩	d ⟨d⟩				k ⟨k/g⟩	ʔ ⟨ʔ⟩
Affricate		ts ⟨ts⟩						
Fricative		s ⟨s⟩		ʃ ⟨š⟩	ʒ ⟨ž⟩			h ⟨h⟩
Approximant		ɹ ⟨r⟩				j ⟨y⟩	w ⟨w⟩	

[m] is placed in parentheses because it appears as an allophone of /w/ in nearly all cases, but that cannot always explain its presence. The presence of a single voiced stop, /d/, contrasting with the voiceless stop /t/, makes Wyandot unusual among Iroquoian languages, as it is the only one with a phonemic voicing distinction. The /r/ sound is pronounced as [ɹ] rather than [r], according to researchers who phonetically transcribed directly from fluent speakers and described it as "corresponding to the English r" and as "the smooth English sound, never vibrant." The Wyandot /d/ and /n/ are both cognate with /n/ in other Northern Iroquoian languages. Although the two largely appear to be in free variation, they clearly contrast in some cases (as in the minimal pairs da 'that, the, who' and na 'now, then'). The ambiguity of the relationship between /d/ and /n/ seems to indicate that the two are in the process of a phonemic split that was not yet complete by the early 20th century.

Another unique feature of Wyandot is the presence of the voiced fricative /ʒ/, creating an /ʃ/-/ʒ/ contrast, but there is no corresponding /s/-/z/ contrast. The phoneme /k/ also has no voiced counterpart.

Consonants may appear in clusters. Word-initial consonant clusters can be up to three consonants long, medial clusters up to four consonants long, and final clusters up to two consonants long.

=== Vowels ===
Barbeau's original transcriptions contained great detail and a complex system of diacritics, resulting in 64 different vowel characters. By eliminating allophones, Kopris found six phonemes, in addition to the marginal phoneme /ã/.

Wyandot vowels recovering the sound system
	Front	Back
High	i ⟨i⟩	u ⟨u⟩
Mid	ɛ̃ ⟨ę⟩	ɔ̃ ⟨ǫ⟩
Low	e ⟨e⟩	a ⟨a⟩

Other analysis of the same Barbeau data suggests that vowel length is contrastive in Wyandot, like in other Iroquoian languages.

=== Phonototactics ===
A Wyandot syllable consists of a vowel as the nucleus, a coda, and an optional onset. Onset clusters of two consonants are possible, with a single triconsonantal cluster (/skw/) occurring only in the first syllable of a word. Codas may consist of up to two consonants. This gives a maximal Wyandot syllable structure of CCCVCC, where C represent a consonant, and V represents a vowel.

== Orthography ==
Wyandot is written in the Latin script, with the additional character ⟨ʔ⟩ representing a glottal stop. The majority of characters represent their IPA values, with a few exceptions. The fricatives /ʃ/ and /ʒ/ are indicated with a hachek, as ⟨š⟩ and ⟨ž⟩, and nasal vowels are indicated by a nasal hook (e.g., ⟨ę⟩, ⟨ǫ⟩). A colon ⟨:⟩ indicates a long vowel (e.g., ⟨ę:⟩). As in the IPA, a raised ⟨ⁿ⟩ indicates prenasalization of stops (e.g., ⟨ⁿd⟩, ⟨ⁿg⟩). Some allophones of consonants are explicitly indicated (e.g. ⟨m⟩, ⟨g⟩).

Wyandot Orthography
Letter	a	a:	d	e	ę	e:	ę:	g	ⁿg	h	i	i:	k	m	n	ⁿd	ǫ	ǫ:	r	s	š	t	ts	u	u:	w	y	ž	ʔ
IPA	a	aː	d	e	ẽ	eː	ẽː	g	ng	h	i	iː	k	m	n	nd	õ	õː	ɹ	s	ʃ	t	ts	u	uː	w	j	ʒ	ʔ

Wendat use a similar orthography, with some differences. Although based on the 17th-century orthography of the Jesuit missionaries, the current orthography no longer uses the Greek letters θ for [tʰ], χ for [kʰ], ͺ for [ç], or ȣ (or 8) for [u] and [w]. Pre-nasalization of stops is indicated by ⟨n⟩ (e.g., ⟨nd⟩). Nasal vowels are indicated as in French by ⟨n⟩ (e.g., ⟨en⟩, ⟨on⟩). To disambiguate nasal vowels from oral vowels followed by /n/, the latter have diaeresis over the vowel (e.g., ⟨ën⟩, ⟨ön⟩). Glottal stops are written with an apostrophe. The fricative /ʃ/ is written as ⟨ch⟩. Consonantal allophones are not explicitly indicated.

== Sample vocabulary ==
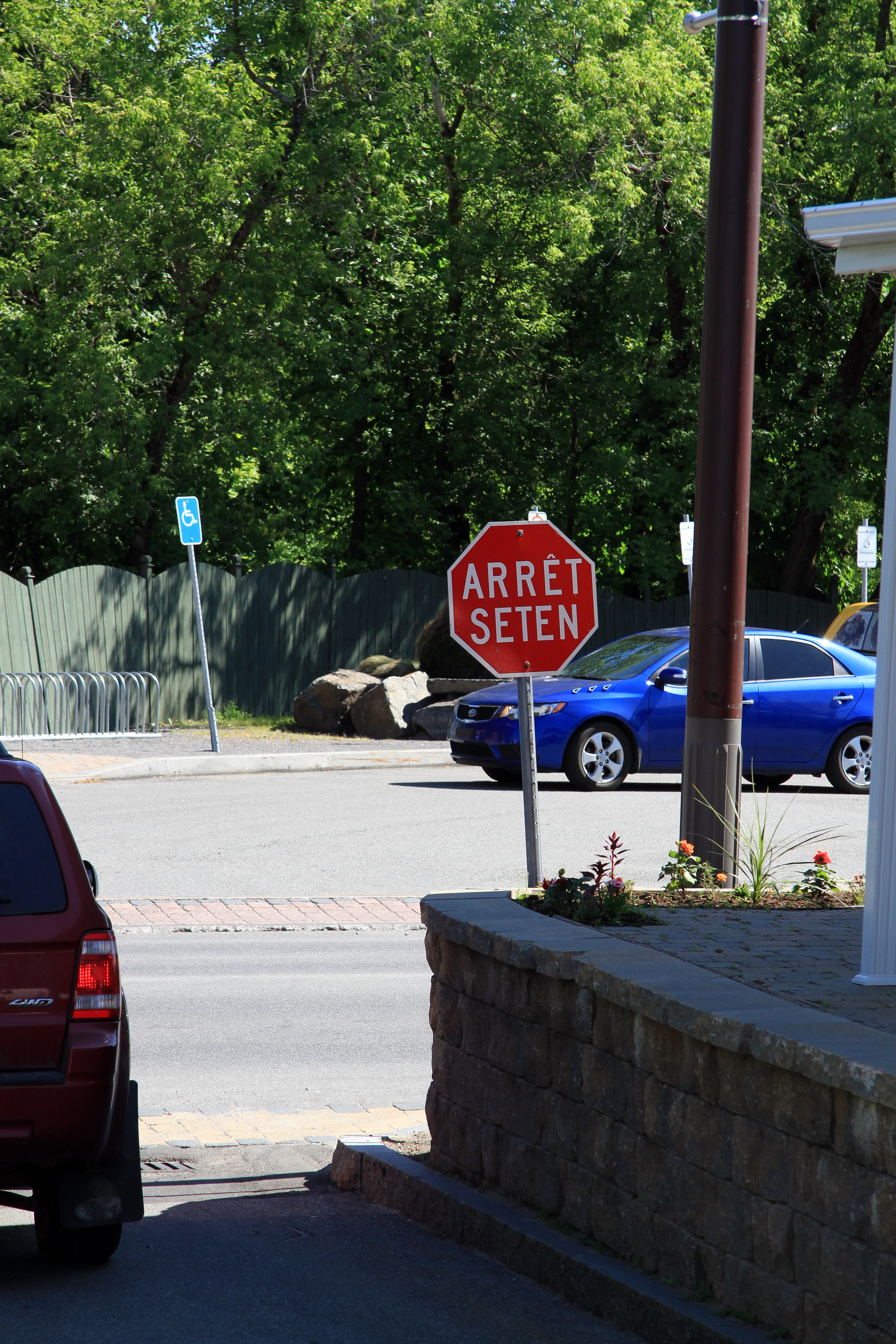
A bilingual stop sign in Wendake

- Seten – Stop, used on road signs (with arrêt) in some Wendat reserves, such as Wendake in Québec.
- Skat – One
- Tindee – Two
- Shenk – Three
- Anduak – Four
- Weeish – Five
- Sandustee – Water
- Kanata – Village
- Kweh – Hello
- Eskoyeh – Farewell
- Tizameh – Thank you
- Hamedisu' – God (almighty)
- Romeh – Man
- änen'enh [a-NEN'-enh] – Mother

== Wyandot and Wendat today ==
Citizens of the Wyandotte Nation, whose headquarters is in Wyandotte, Oklahoma, are promoting the study of Wyandot as a second language among its people as part of a cultural revival. Since 2005, Richard Zane Smith of the Wyandot Nation of Kansas (an unrecognized non-profit organization that identifies as a Native American tribe) has been volunteering and teaching in the Wyandotte schools with the aid of the linguist Kopris.

Linguistic work is also being done on the closely related Wendat. The anthropologist John Steckley was reported in 2007 as being "the sole speaker" (non-native) of Wendat. Several Wendat scholars have master's degrees in Wendat language and have been active as linguists in the Wendat community in Quebec. In Wendake, Quebec, the First Nations people are working on a revival of Wendat language and culture. The language is being introduced in adult classes and into the village primary school. The Wendat linguist Megan Lukaniec has been instrumental in helping to create curriculum, infrastructure, and materials for Wendat language programs.

The Wyandot language is used in the television series Barkskins.

== See also ==
- Gabriel Sagard, Le grand voyage and Dictionnaire de la langue huronne (Dictionary of the Huron Language), 17th century
- John Steckley, ed. (2009). Dictionary of the Huron Language

== Sources ==
- Native-languages.org: Wyandot words
- Language page of the Wyandotte Nation
- "Wyandotte Language Lessons". cs.sou.edu. Archived from the original on 2017-10-11.
