= Wyandot people =

Indigenous people of the Northeastern Woodlands

Wyandot Waⁿdát
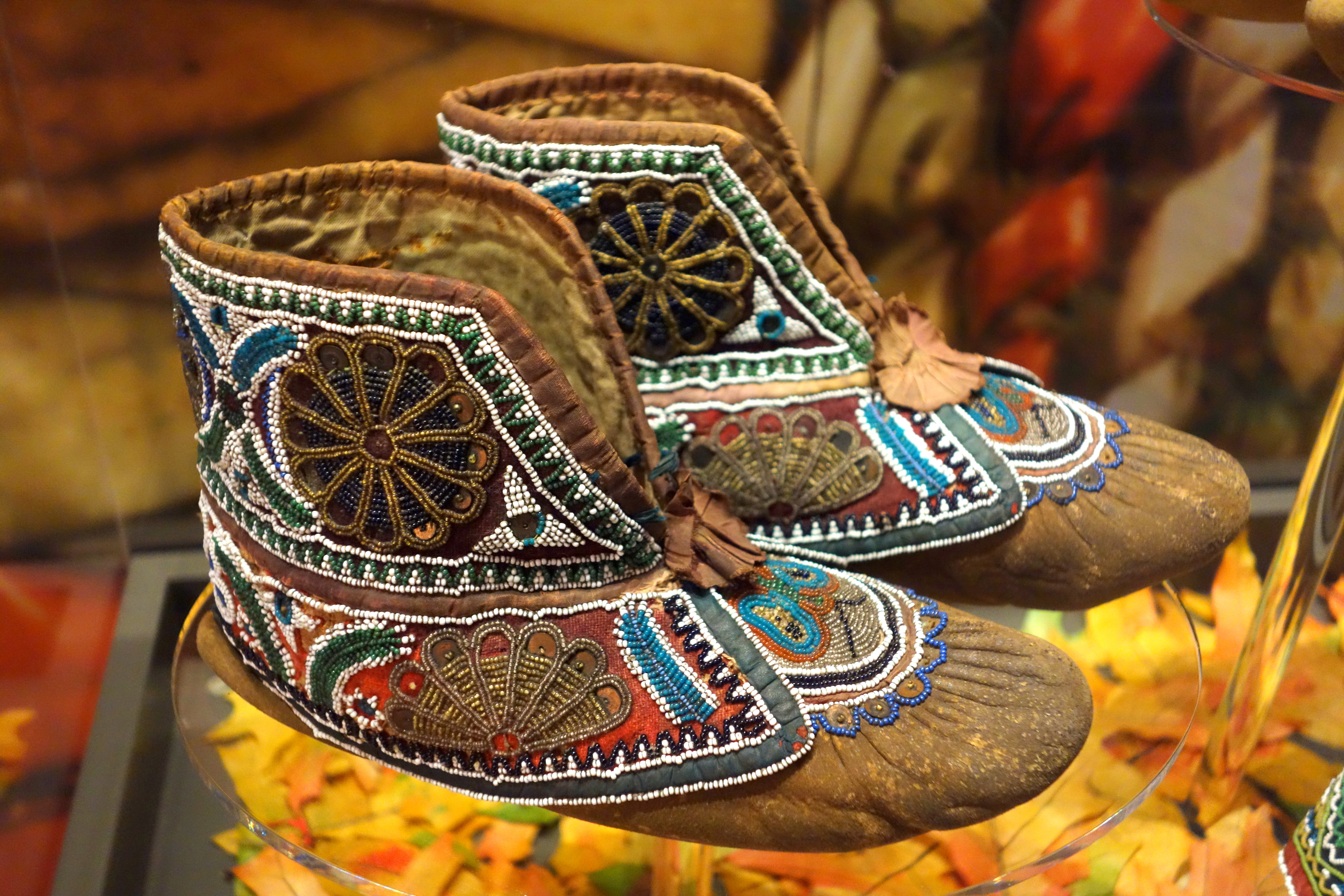
- Wyandot moccasins, c. 1880, in the collection of the Bata Shoe Museum

Regions with significant populations
- United States; Oklahoma Kansas Michigan
- Wyandotte Nation of Oklahoma: 7,350
- Wyandot Nation of Kansas: 900
- Wyandot of Anderdon Nation: 800

Languages
- English, French, Wyandot

Religion
- Christianity, traditional beliefs

Related ethnic groups
- Wendat, Petun, Wenro, Neutral, Erie, other Iroquoian peoples

The Wyandot people (Wyandot: Waⁿdát, also known as the Wyandotte) are an Indigenous Iroquoian people who emerged in the Great Lakes region in the mid-17th century. The Wyandot developed through a process of ethnogenesis during the Beaver Wars, when refugees from the Etionnontateronnon (Petun), Wenrohronon, and Wendat (Huron) coalesced following their dispersal by the Haudenosaunee (Iroquois). The Petun/Wendat relocated several times until settling at Michilimackinac in 1671. They migrated to the Détroit area in 1701 and by the mid-18th century had spread into the Ohio Country where they became known as the Wyandot. The Wyandot actively supported the French during the French and Indian War and the British during the American Revolutionary War. They were part of the Northwestern Confederacy formed after the war to resist American expansionism. In the early 1840s, American removal policies forced the Wyandot to relocate to Indian Territory (Kansas) west of the Mississippi River and a few years later to northeastern Oklahoma.

In the United States, the Wyandotte Nation is a federally recognized tribe headquartered in Wyandotte, Oklahoma. The Wyandot Nation of Kansas and the Wyandot of Anderdon Nation located in Michigan are organizations that self-identify as Wyandot. Since 1999, three nations are affiliated with the related Wendat Nation of Quebec through the Wendat Confederacy.

== Name and language ==
The Wyandot are primarily the descendants of the Etionnontateronnon (Tionontati) and Wendat who historically lived near the southern shores of Georgian Bay, part of Lake Huron, in what is now south-central Ontario. They are closely related to other Iroquoian peoples from the Great Lakes region including the Haudenosaunee, Erie, Neutral and Wenrohronon (Wenro).

In the early 17th century, the Wendat, a confederacy of four nations, occupied the territory they called Wendake (Huronia) located between Georgian Bay and Lake Simcoe. The Etionnontateronnon, also known as the Tionontati or the Petun. lived to the southwest of Wendake along the base of the Niagara Escarpment. The Wendat and Etionnontateronnon were essentially two branches of the same cultural tree, sharing an almost identical way of life rooted in Iroquoian traditions. Both societies were organized into matrilineal clans and lived in palisaded villages of bark-covered longhouses, where they practised a "Three Sisters" (maize, beans, and squash) agricultural economy.

Wyandot (Wyandotte) stems from the Wendat word Waⁿdát which translates roughly as "dwellers on the peninsula". They were known to the French as the "Huron". This name is believed to be a derivation of the word hure (boar's head), a reference to the hairstyle of Wendat warriors. The Etionnontateronnon, an Wendat word meaning "people of the hill" were known to the French as the "Petun", an obsolete French word meaning tobacco. The Wendat and Petun spoke mutually intelligible languages of the Northern Iroquoian language family. Research by linguist John Steckley suggests that the Wyandot language which evolved after the Petun and Wendat were driven from their homeland is effectively a Petun dialect. Steckley argues that the Petun element was the most significant contributor to the Wyandot's lasting cultural and linguistic identity.

By the time the Petun/Wendat settled near Detroit around 1701 they were effectively functioning as the Wyandot people. Although they referred to themselves as the Wendat, the French continued to call them the Huron. British traders who encountered the Wendat in the Ohio Country in the mid-18th century recorded their name as Wyandot, and later applied this name to those in the Detroit area as well.

== History ==
=== Emergence of the Wyandot ===
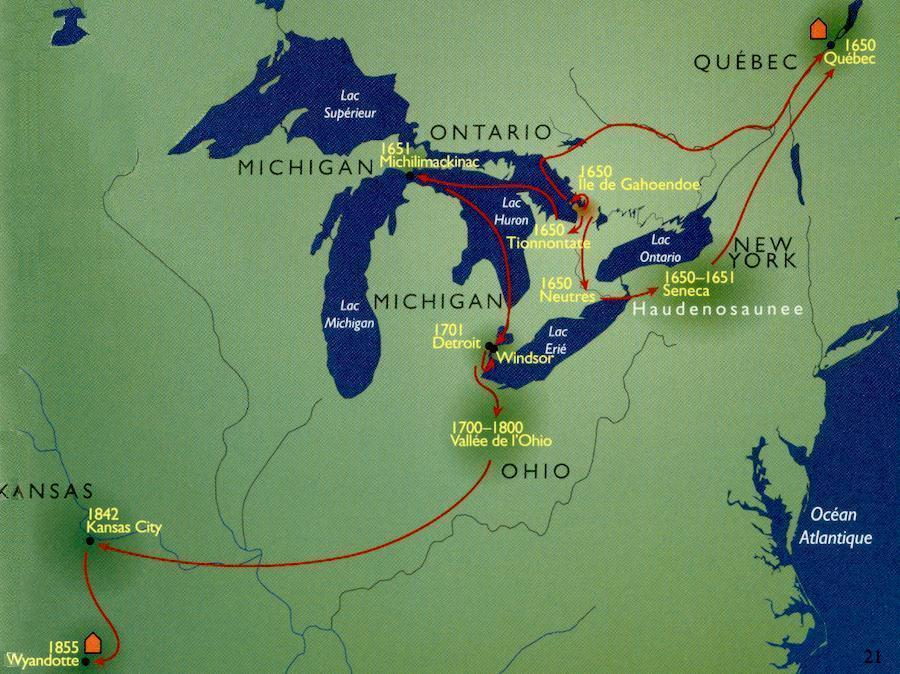
Movements of the Wendat diaspora. Arrows moving westward from the Tionnontate are Wyandot groups.

The Wyandot were the result of Wendat refugees merging with the Petun following the destruction of Wendake by the Haudenosaunee in 1649. Although the Wendat had been in conflict with the Haudenosaunee for many years, the nature of the conflict changed in the late 1640s. Supplied with firearms by the Dutch, the Haudenosaunee began conducting large-scale attacks against Wendat villages in 1647. After the destruction of roughly half their villages, the Wendat decided to abandon Wendake in 1649. Many fled to Gahoendoe (Christian Island) and later to Île d'Orléans on the St. Lawrence River near Quebec, where they became the modern Wendat Nation. Others, primarily from the Attignawantan nation, took refuge with the Petun. With them was a population of Wenro who had fled Haudenosaunee aggression a decade earlier.

The Petun were attacked by the Haudenosaunee in late 1649, dispersing them along with the Wendat and Wenro. They decided take refuge with the Odawa (Ottawa) to the north. They settled briefly on Mackinac Island before moving further west to Rock Island on Lake Michigan at the mouth of Green Bay. In 1659, they moved inland to the Black River. Conflict with the Sioux pushed them north to Chequamegon Bay on Lake Superior in 1661. In 1671, they moved to Michilimackinac where the Jesuits had established the St. Ignace Mission.

==== Kondiaronk ====
Kondiaronk, a Petun known to the French as Le Rat, became leader of the Petun/Wendat at Michilimackinac and gained fame as a skilled diplomat and brilliant negotiator of the Wyandot, famed for his oratory. In 1689, fearing that a treaty between the French and the Haudenosaunee would marginalize his people, he led an ambush against an Onondaga peace delegation travelling to Montreal. He captured the delegates and convinced them that the French had ordered the attack, a deception that effectively shattered the peace talks and reignited the war. In 1701, at the age of 52, he played a critical role in the negotiations that led to the Great Peace of Montreal. Despite being terminally ill, he gave a powerful final speech that helped unite 39 different Indigenous nations, ending decades of conflict between the Haudenousaunee, the French, and France's Indigenous allies. He died a few days before the signing of the treaty in Montreal on August 4, 1701, and was accorded a grand funeral. His signature was added posthumously to the treaty in recognition of his contribution to the success of the event.

=== 18th century ===
In 1701, Antoine de la Mothe Cadillac invited the Petun/Wendat at Michilimackinac to settle near Fort Pontchartrain du Détroit. While based at Détroit, they participated in the Fox Wars against the Meskwaki, and were often in conflict with the Odawa who had been invited to settle nearby.

In the summer of 1728, the Jesuit Father Armand de La Richardie, established a mission across the river from Fort Pontchartrain at La Pointe de Montréal. It was given the imposing name of The Mission of Our Lady of the Assumption among the Hurons of Detroit. In 1742, the mission moved to Bois Blanc Island but returned to La Pointe de Montréal in 1748.

In 1738, the Petun/Wendat relocated to Sandusky Bay due to Odawa harassment following the end of their alliance against the Catawba (Flathead). They returned to Détroit the following year but split into two factions. One faction settled on Bois Blanc Island while a second faction, led by Nicholas Orontony founded the village of Junundat south of Sandusky Bay. English traders referred to Orontony's band as the Wyandot, a name that eventually encompassed all of the Petun/Wendat.

During King George's War, the Petun/Wendat at Détroit initially supported the French, but withdrew their support when the war curtailed the supply of trade goods. Meanwhile, Orontony supported the British. After a failed attempt to destroy Fort Pontchartrain du Détroit in 1747, his faction abandoned Junundat and established the village of Conchake at the head of the Muskingum River, a tributary of the Ohio River. Following the death of Orontony in 1750, a smallpox epidemic in 1752, and the attack on the nearby British-aligned Miami village of Pickawillany, the Muskingum River settlement was abandoned. A number of the Conchaké Wyandot returned to Détroit, however, many returned to Sandusky Bay and reestablished Junundat.

In 1755, during the French and Indian War, Wyandot from Détroit and Sandusky participated in the defeat of the Braddock's Expedition at the Battle of the Monongahela.

In 1763, the Wyandot were key participants in the Indigenous coalition that opposed the British during Pontiac's War. In May 1763, the Sandusky Wyandot attacked Fort Sandusky and slaughtered the small British garrison. Two months later Junundat was destroyed by Captain James Dayell who was proceeding to Fort Detroit with reinforcements. The Wyandot abandoned their village at Dayell's approach and moved west to the Sandusky River valley. The Detroit Wyandot took part in the Siege of Fort Detroit led by the Odawa chief Pontiac. They participated in an attack at Point Pelee on a British detachment bringing supplies to the fort, and in the ambush of British reinforcements at the Battle of Bloody Run.

In August 1763, at the Battle of Bushy Run, a combined force of Lenape, Shawnee, Mingo and Wyandot were narrowly defeated after they attacked and surrounded Colonel Henry Bouquet's detachment of British regulars.

The Wyandot fully supported the British during the American Revolutionary War. The British Indian Department appointed interpreter Simon Girty to work with the Wyandot in the Ohio Country. The Wyandot, accompanied by Girty, participated in the February 1779 attack on Fort Laurens, the June 1780 attacks on Ruddle's Fort and Martin's Station in Kentucky, Lochry's Defeat in August 1781, and the Battle of Sandusky in June 1782.. Wyandot warriors were also present at the unsuccessful Siege of Fort Henry in September 1782.

During the Northwest Indian War, Girty was chosen to lead the Wyandot contingent when more than a thousand Shawnee, Miami, Lenape, Wyandot, Odawa, Potawatomi, and Ojibwe warriors soundly defeated the expedition led by Arthur St. Clair at the Battle of the Wabash in November 1791. In August 1794, the Wyandot, led by Tarhe, fought at the Battle of Fallen Timbers when the Northwestern Confederacy was defeated by the Legion of the United States commanded by Anthony Wayne. Tarhe was a signatory to the Treaty of Greenville in 1795.

=== Early 19th century ===
In 1807, the Wyandot in the Detroit area joined the Odawa, Potawatomi and Ojibwe in signing the Treaty of Detroit. Under its terms, the tribes ceded to the United States a tract of land comprising roughly the southeast quarter of the lower peninsula of Michigan and a small section of Ohio north of the Maumee River. The Wyandot retained small pockets of land within the ceded territory. The treaty was signed by William Hull, the Governor of the Michigan Territory, on November 7, 1807, and provided the four Indigenous nations with a payment of $10,000 in goods and money, and an annuity of $2,400 per year.

Shortly before the War of 1812, Roundhead (Stayeghtha), an early supporter of the Shawnee war leader Tecumseh and his brother the Prophet (Tenskwatawa), led 300 Wyandot from Ohio to the Michigan Territory. When war was declared, he convinced the reluctant Michigan Wyandot leader Walk-in-the-Water (Myeerah) to support the British. Roundhead led Wyandot warriors at the Battle of Brownstown and the siege of Detroit. Wyandot warriors were instrumental in defeating the Americans at the Battle of Frenchtown in January 1813 and took part in the siege of Fort Meigs a few months later. Roundhead died of natural causes in August 1813. Shortly before the Battle of the Thames in October 1813, Walk-in-the-Water and about 60 of his followers withdrew their support and defected to the Americans. Meanwhile, the Wyandot in Ohio, led by Tahre, remained mostly neutral during the war.

The 1817 Treaty of Fort Meigs further reduced Wyandot territory in Ohio to a 7,680 acres (3,110 hectares) tract of land known as the Upper Sandusky Reservation. In 1819, the Methodist Episcopal Church established a mission at Upper Sandusky. The Wyandott Mission thus became the first church-wide mission of what is now the United Methodist Church.

=== Removal ===
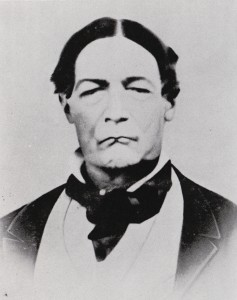
William Walker (1800–1874), a leader of the Wyandot people and a prominent citizen of early-day Kansas

In the 1840s, most of the surviving Wyandot people were displaced to Kansas Indigenous territory through the US federal policy of forced Indian removal. Using the funds they received for their lands in Ohio, the Wyandot purchased 23,000 acres (93 km^{2}) of land for $46,080 in what is now Wyandotte County, Kansas, from the Lenape. The Lenape had been grateful for the hospitality which the Wyandot had given them in Ohio, as the Lenape had been forced to move west under pressure from Anglo-European colonists. The Wyandot acquired a more-or-less square parcel north and west of the junction of the Kansas River and the Missouri River. A United States government treaty granted the Wyandot Nation a small portion of fertile land located in an acute angle of the Missouri River and Kansas River, which they purchased from the Delaware in 1843. Also, the government granted 32 "floating sections", located on public lands west of the Mississippi River.

In June 1853, Big Turtle, a Wyandot chief, wrote to the Ohio State Journal regarding the current condition of his tribe. The Wyandot had received nearly $127,000 for their lands in 1845. Big Turtle noted that, in the spring of 1850, the tribal chiefs retroceded the granted land to the government. They invested $100,000 of the proceeds in 5% government stock. After removal to Kansas, the Wyandot had founded good libraries along with two thriving Sabbath schools. They were in the process of organizing a division of the Sons of Temperance and maintained a sizable temperance society. Big Turtle commented on the agricultural yield, which produced an annual surplus for the market. He said that the thrift of the Wyandot exceeded that of any tribe north of the Arkansas line. According to his account, the Wyandot nation was "contented and happy", and enjoyed better living conditions in the Indigenous territory than they had in Ohio.

By 1855 the number of Wyandot had diminished to 600 or 700 people. On August 14 of that year, the Wyandot Nation elected a chief. The Kansas correspondent of the Missouri Republican reported that the judges of the election were three elders who were trusted by their peers. The Wyandot offered some of the floating sections of land for sale on the same day at $800. A section was composed of 640 acres (2.6 km^{2}). Altogether 20,480 acres (82.9 km^{2}) were sold for $25,600. They were located in Kansas, Nebraska, and unspecified sites. Surveys were not required, with the title becoming complete at the time of location.

The Wyandot played an important role in Kansas politics. On July 26, 1853, at a meeting at the Wyandot Council house in Kansas City, William Walker (Wyandot) was elected provisional governor of Nebraska Territory, which included Kansas. He was elected by Wyandot, white traders, and outside interests who wished to preempt the federal government's organization of the territory and to benefit from the settlement of Kansas by white settlers. Walker and others promoted Kansas as the route for the proposed transcontinental railroad. Although the federal government did not recognize Walker's election, the political activity prompted the federal government to pass the Kansas–Nebraska Act to organize Kansas and Nebraska territories.

An October 1855 article in The New York Times reported that the Wyandot were free (that is, they had been accepted as US citizens) and without the restrictions placed on other tribes. Their leaders were unanimously pro-slavery, which meant 900 or 1,000 additional votes in opposition to the Free State movement of Kansas. But the truth was that Kansas Wyandot were abolitionists and antislavery. They were forcefully relocated to what became Quindaro, Kansas. In the years prior to the Civil War, Quindaro was a hub for abolitionists. Wyandot tribal members actively helped people fleeing slavery. Founded in 1856 on the Missouri River about 6 miles (10 km) above the mouth of the Kansas River, It was an important part of the Underground Railroad. The Quindaro Townsite received National Historic Landmark status in May 2025.

In 1867, after the American Civil War, additional members were removed from the Midwest to Indian Territory. Today more than 4,000 Wyandot can be found in eastern Kansas and northeastern Oklahoma.

The last known original Wyandot of Ohio was Margaret Grey Eyes Solomon, known as "Mother Solomon". The daughter of Chief John Grey Eyes, she was born in 1816 and left Ohio in 1843. By 1889 she had returned to Ohio, when she was recorded as a spectator to the restoration of the Wyandot Mission Church in Upper Sandusky. She died in Upper Sandusky on August 17, 1890. The last full blood Wyandot was Bill Moose Crowfoot who died in Upper Arlington, Ohio in 1937. He stated that 12 Wyandot families remained behind.

=== 20th century to present ===
Since the mid-century, the Wyandot pursued land claims in the United States since they had not been fully compensated for lost lands. The US federal government set up the Indian Claims Court in the 1940s to address grievances filed by various Native American tribes. The court adjudicated claims, and Congress allocated $800 million to compensate tribes for losses due to treaties broken by the US government, or losses of land due to settlers who invaded their territories. The Wyandot filed a land claim for compensation due to the forced sale of their land in the Ohio region to the federal government under the 1830 Indian Removal Act, which forced Native Americans to move west of the Mississippi River to an area designated as Indian Territory. Originally the United States paid the Wyandot for their land at the rate of 75 cents per acre, but the land was worth $1.50 an acre.

Although Congress intended to have a deadline by which Indigenous claims had to be settled, Federal district courts continued to hear land claims and other cases for compensation. In February 1985, the US government finally agreed to pay descendants of the Wyandot $5.5 million to settle the tribe's outstanding claim. The decision settled claims related to the 143-year-old treaty. In 1842 the United States had forced the tribe to sell their Ohio lands for less-than-fair value. A spokesman for the Bureau of Indian Affairs said that the government would pay $1,600 each, in July 1985, to 3,600 people in Kansas and Oklahoma who could prove they were descendants of Wyandot affected by Indian Removal.

During the 20th century, contemporary Wyandot continued to assert their culture and identity. On August 27, 1999, representatives of the far-flung Wyandot bands from Quebec, Kansas, Oklahoma, and Michigan gathered at their historic homeland in Midland, Ontario. There they formally re-established the Wendat Confederacy.

There are also groups in List of organizations that self-identify as Native American tribes § Kansas and List of organizations that self-identify as Native American tribes § Michigan who self-identify as Wyandot descendants.

== Recognized Wyandot nation ==
The United States, has one federally recognized Wyandot tribe:

- The Wyandotte Nation is headquartered in Wyandotte, Oklahoma, and in 2026 had just over 7,350 enrolled citizens.

== Unrecognized and defunct groups ==
Two organizations that self-identify as Native American tribes in the United States identify as Wyandot and are recognized as such by the Wendat and Wyandotte Nations:

- Wyandot Nation of Kansas, headquartered in Kansas City, Kansas
- Wyandot of Anderdon Nation, with headquarters in Trenton, Michigan

Defunct Wyandot communities include:

- Upper Sandusky Reservation (1818–1842), a former Wyandot reservation in Ohio, United States
- Kuskusky, several Wyandot communities in Pennsylvania and Ohio, during the mid-18th century
