= Wenrohronon =

Indigenous people of the Northeastern Woodlands

Wenro people Wenrohronon
- Before 1600–1638
- Wenro and neighboring nations in the early 17th century
- Common languages: Wenro (Iroquoian languages)
- Religion: Traditional Iroquoian religion
- Demonym: Wenro
- History
  - Established: Before 1600
  - Disestablished: 1638

Population
  - 1600: Unknown (estimated in the low thousands)
  - 1650: 600 refugees adopted into the Wendat
- Today part of: Descendants among the Wyandot people

The Wenrohronon or Wenro people were an Indigenous people of the Northeastern Woodlands, historically from what is now western New York. They were an Iroquoian people who are thought to have been closely related to the Neutral. They spoke a language that was mutually intelligible with that spoken by the Wendat. Like most Iroquoian groups, they were characterized by a matrilineal social structure, communal living in longhouses, and an agricultural economy centered on the cultivation of the "Three Sisters" (maize, beans, and squash).

In the late 1630s, during the Beaver Wars, the Wenro were threatened by the Haudenosaunee. The Neutral Confederacy had previously protected the Wenro from the Seneca, the westernmost nation of the Haudenosaunee, but had withdrawn their support leaving the Wenro open to raids. The Wenro subsequently sought asylum with the Wendat who lived in what is now southern Ontario. The Jesuit Relation of 1639–1640 records 600 Wenro arriving at the village of the village of Ossossané on Nottawasaga Bay. A decade later the Haudenosaunee attacked the Wendat in order to replenish population lost to epidemics and eliminate the Wendat as a rival in the fur trade. The Wenro at Ossossané likely joined the Wendat refugees who fled westward to seek refuge among the Petun. After the Petun were attacked by the Haudenosaunee in 1649, the surviving Petun, Wendat, and Wenro moved northwest together, and their descendants eventually merged to become the Wyandot.

The name "Wenrohronon" has been translated as "people at the place of the floating scum." According to early ethnohistorian J. N. B. Hewitt, this was a reference to the oil spring at what is now Cuba, New York. This oil spring was the first recorded source of petroleum in what is now the United States. Most researchers, however, place the Wenro further to the north in the vicinity of the Old Orchard Swamp (south of Medina, New York). In The Jesuit Relations, it is recorded that the Wenro's territory was located east of the Neutral and west of the Seneca. This places the Wenro to the north of the Erie who lived south of the Buffalo River. Wenro territory is thought to have encompassed the area south of Lake Ontario between the Niagara and Genessee rivers, however, it is likely the Wenro inhabited only one or two villages.

== History ==
The primary source of information about the Wenro is the Jesuit Relations, a collection of reports and letters written by French Jesuit missionaries in New France between 1632 and 1673. No archaeological site has been conclusively identified as belonging to the Wenro, however, the presence of Genoa Fringed pottery at Wendat sites is thought to be an indicator of a Wenro refugee population. Genoa Fringed pottery has also been found at a number of Neutral and Erie sites.

French interpreter Étienne Brûlé may have been the only European to visit the Wenro homeland before they were dispersed. In the summer of 1615, while visiting the Wendat, Samuel de Champlain sent Brûlé on a mission to enlist the help of the Carantouanais for an attack on the Haudenosaunee. Traditionally, the Carantouanais have been identified as Susquehannock who lived on the Susquehanna River to the south of Haudenosaunee territory. While Brûlé was unable to bring Carantouan warriors in time for the attack, he later reported to Champlain that he spent that autumn and winter "investigating the neighboring nations and regions," which geographically included the Wenro.

In the summer of 1638, the Wenro made the strategic decision to leave their territory between the Neutral and Seneca nations. The Jesuit Relations record that after the Neutral withdrew their support for unknown reasons, the Wenro were left vulnerable to Seneca raids. Instead waiting to be destroyed, they sent a delegation to the Wendat and asked for asylum. Over 600 Wenro refugees traveled 80 leagues (240 miles) through Neutral territory to reach the village of Ossossané on Nottawasaga Bay. Though many arrived suffering from disease, they successfully integrated into the Wendat Confederacy. A few Wenro families may have also taken refuge with the Neutral.

In July 1648, the Haudenosaunee attacked and destroyed the Wendat village of Teanaostaiaé. This was followed by an attack in March 1649 on two more villages. Following these attacks many of the Wendat burned their remaining villages and fled to Gahoendoe (Christian Island). Most of the population of Ossossané, however, headed west and merged with the neighboring Petun. After the Petun were attacked in December 1649, they took refuge with the Odawa at Michilimackinac and later headed further west to Rock Island on Lake Michigan at the mouth of Green Bay. In 1659, they moved inland to the Black River. Conflict with the Sioux pushed them north to Chequamegon Bay on Lake Superior in 1661. In 1671, they returned to Michilimackinac where the Jesuits had established the St. Ignace Mission.

At the invitation of Antoine de la Mothe Cadillac, they migrated to the Détroit area in 1701 and by the mid-18th century had spread into the Ohio Country where they became known as the Wyandot. The Wyandot actively supported the French during the French and Indian War and the British during the American Revolutionary War. They were part of the Northwestern Confederacy formed after the war to resist American expansionism. In the early 1840s, American removal policies forced the Wyandot to relocate to Indian Territory (Kansas) west of the Mississippi River and a few years later to northeastern Oklahoma. Today, descendants of the Wenro are enrolled in the Wyandotte Nation, located in Northeastern Oklahoma.
