= Seneca Indian School =

Native American boarding school in Wyandotte, Oklahoma

Coordinates: 36.80167°N 94.72556°W

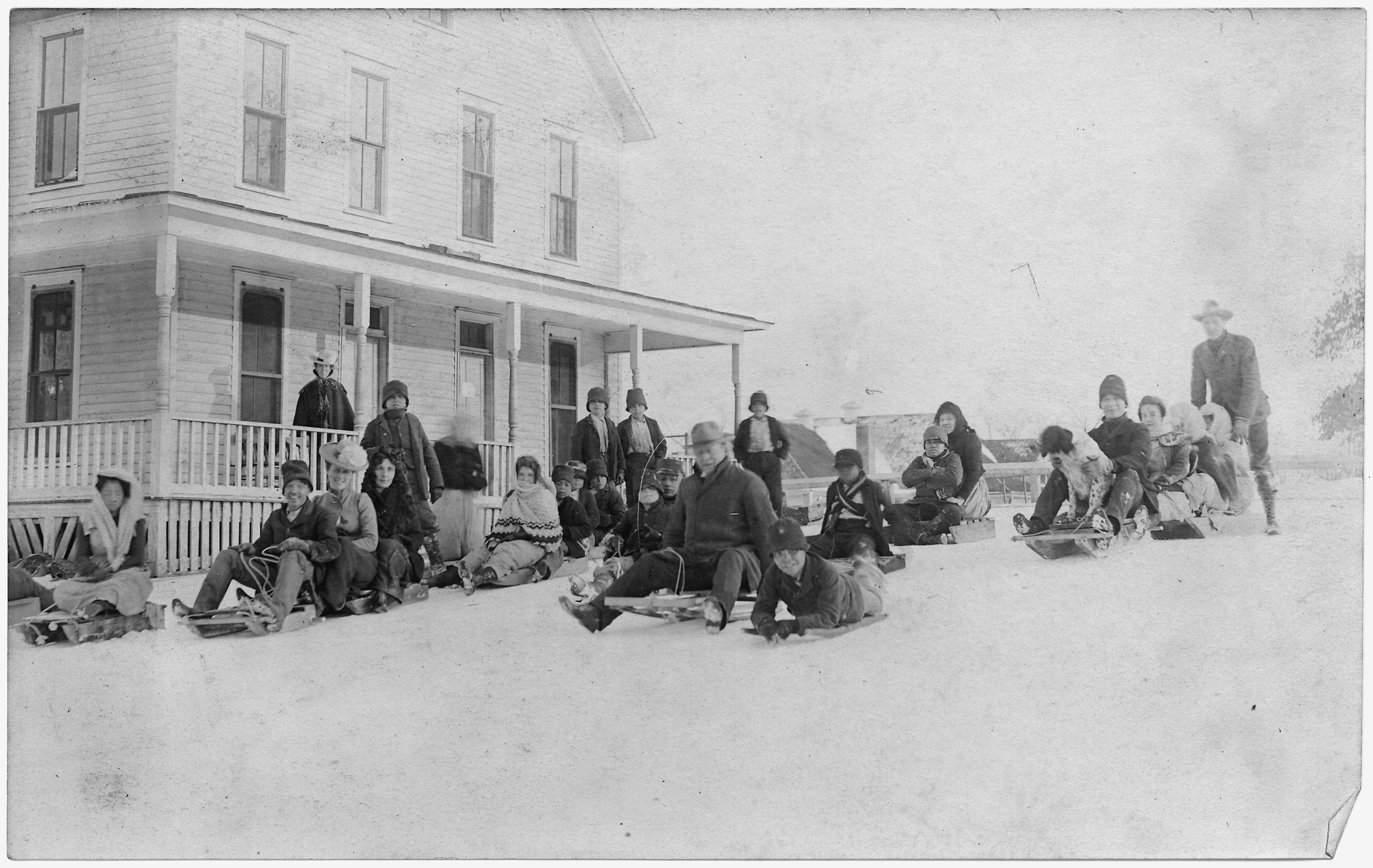
Seneca Indian School in 1905

The Seneca Indian School was a Native American boarding school located in Wyandotte, Oklahoma. Initially founded for Seneca, Shawnee, and Wyandotte children, in later years it had many Cherokee students. The school operated from 1872 to 1980.

== History ==
In 1867 the Wyandotte tribe was removed to this area.

In 1869 the Quakers (Society of Friends) established a mission in Wyandotte. The Wyandotte Tribal Council donated land for the Quakers to establish a boarding school for Seneca, Shawnee and Wyandotte children. Construction of the school began in 1871 and classes began in 1872.

Other names for the school were Wyandotte Mission, Seneca, Shawnee, and Wyandotte Industrial Boarding School, and Seneca Boarding School.

By the 1920s, the composition of the student body had changed, and was largely Cherokee students.

In 1927 the school had an outbreak of measles and typhoid, and "dozens of children" died.

In 1928, a new principal was appointed, Joe Kagey. The school changed its admittance policy, and was opened to children of all tribes. It became an "institutional" school for children coming from situations of hardship.

In 1952, there were 173 Cherokee students, and a number of students from other tribes. Kagey retired in 1956.

On June 15, 1980 the school closed. The school's 189 acres of land were returned to the Wyandotte Tribe.

A selection of school records created between 1916–1970 are held by the National Archives.
