= Erie people =

Historical Indigenous people of the Great Lakes until the 1650s

Erie
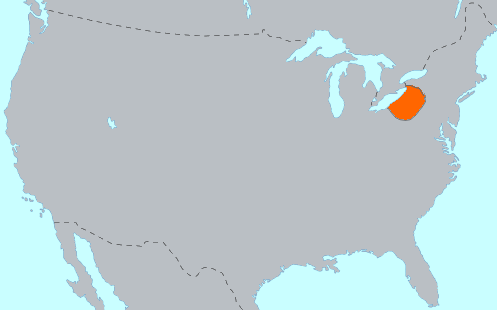
- Territory of the Erie people c. 1650

Total population
- Extinct as a tribe after the mid-17th century

Regions with significant populations
- New York, Pennsylvania

Languages
- Erie language

Religion
- Indigenous

Related ethnic groups
- Neutral, Wenrohronon, Haudenosaunee, Wendat, Petun

The Erie were an Indigenous people of the Northeastern Woodlands who lived in the lower Great Lakes region until the mid-17th century. An Iroquoian people, they shared many cultural traits with their neighbors, including the Neutral, Wendat (Huron) and Seneca. Their territory was southeast of Lake Erie in what became western New York and northwestern Pennsylvania.

The Erie ceased to exist as a political entity in the mid-1650s after several years of warfare with the Haudenosaunee (Iroquois). Most survivors were absorbed into the Haudenosaunee. An Erie remnant may have fled south to Virginia, where they were called the Richahecrians, before migrating to the Deep South where they became known as the Westo.

== Name ==
The Erie were also known as the Eriehronon, Ehriehronnons, Eriechronon, and La Nation du Chat. European contact with the Erie was exceptionally limited. Most of what is known about them comes from French missionaries and their Wendat informants. In 1624, Gabriel Sagard, a Recollet missionary, learned about the Eriehronon from the Wendat. He interpreted this word to mean La Nation du Chat (Cat Nation), possibly referring to raccoons rather than felines, as chat sauvauge was what the inhabitants of New France called raccoons. The Jesuit Relation for 1653/1654 records "the Ehriehronnons... these we call the Cat Nation, because of the prodigious number of Wildcats in their country, two or three times as large as our domestic Cats, but of a handsome and valuable fur." It has been suggested that a more accurate translation of Eriehronon would be "People of the Panther" or "People of the Long Tail" referring to the eastern panther (Puma concolor couguar).

== Language and culture ==
The Erie spoke a Northern Iroquoian language. While the language is unattested, Jesuit missionaries recorded that the Erie language was mutually intelligible to that of the Wendat and the Neutral. The Jesuit Relation for 1647/1647 records that the Erie were said to "till the soil and speak the same language as our Hurons." Because the Erie were dispersed by the Haudenosaunee in the mid-1650s, their language is extinct.

Arthur's C. Parker's 1907 archaeological study of the Ripley Site in Chautauqua County, New York identified the Erie as a sophisticated, matrilineal, and clan-based Iroquoian society. Central to their village life were large, bark-covered longhouses arranged within palisaded enclosures, which served as multi-family dwellings for extended maternal kin groups. Their economy relied on the Three Sisters (maize, beans, and squash), supplemented by hunting, fishing and foraging. Their material culture was characterized by pottery featuring incised patterns and flared rims, and by the prevalence of panther effigies. Parker’s recovery of specialized artifacts, such as pipes and bone carvings featuring feline motifs, suggested a spiritual connection to the eastern panther. His analysis of Erie burial customs, which included "flexed" positioning and the placement of high-quality pottery and grave goods, suggested a culture with a complex belief in the afterlife and a high social value placed on kinship and communal care.

== Territory ==
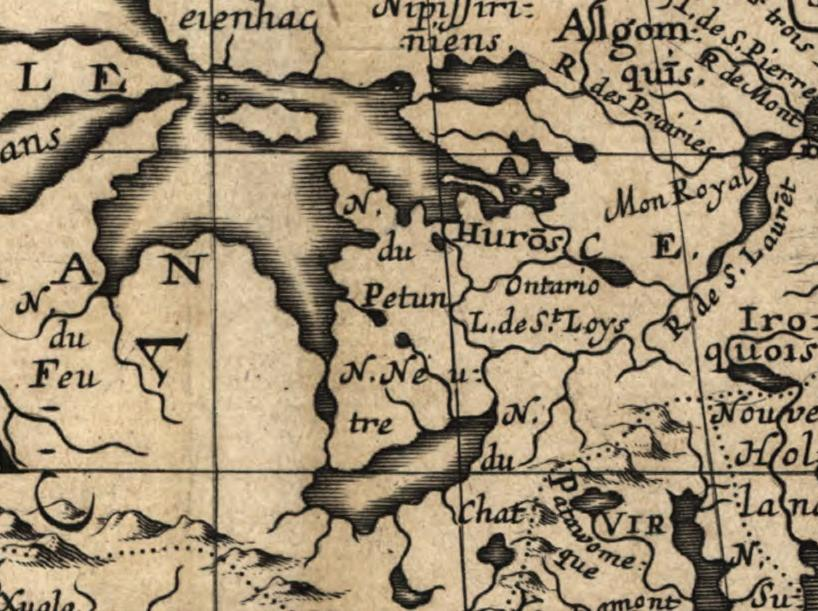
Detail from Nicholas Sanson's 1650 Amerique Septentrionale Map

The Erie were a loose confederacy of three distinct settlement clusters, potentially representing three to five nations. Their total population, before European diseases including smallpox and measles halved their numbers, is estimated at roughly 12,000. Although French maps from the period show the Erie occupying the entire south shore of Lake Erie, one archaeologist as of 2001 supported a multifold division of the region: Algonquian groups inhabited the western reaches, while the Erie were situated to the east."

The Erie lived along the southeastern shore of Lake Erie between the Buffalo River and Presque Isle Bay. To the east of the Erie was the homeland of the Seneca, one of the five nations that made up the Haudenosaunee (Iroquois) Confederacy. Across Lake Erie were the Neutral whose villages were located in the Niagara Peninsula and the Grand River watershed. North of the Buffalo River were the Wenrohronon (Wenro), who proactively joined the Wendat in 1638 after losing the protection of the Neutral. To the south, Erie influence extended up onto the northern Allegheny Plateau, but there is no archaeological evidence of permanent upland habitation in the early 17th century.

West of Presque Isle Bay was a buffer zone between the Erie and people in the Cuyahoga River region belonging to the Whittlesey tradition. Once thought to be Erie, the people of the Whittlesey tradition built their villages atop isolated river bluffs protected by ditches and embankments. They lived in small oval or rectangular structures instead of the communal longhouses typical of Iroquoian cultures, and produced grit-tempered as opposed to shell-tempered pottery. The people represented by the Whittlesey tradition were initially believed to be a distinct Iroquoian entity closely related to the Erie, however, there has been a movement toward seeing the Whittlesey as an Algonquian entity influenced by their Iroquoian neighbors.

The names of two Erie villages appear in the Jesuit Relations. Rigué has often been identified as the Erie "capital" and the site of a massive Seneca and Onondaga attack in 1654. Pioneer linguist and ethnographer J.N.B. Hewitt interpreted Rigué to mean "at the place of the panther." More recent work in ethnolinguistics supports a definition of "at the place of the cherry trees." While Hewitt placed Rigué at Presque Isle Bay, archaeologist Marion White suggested that the village would have been located further to the east. The identification of Gentaienton as a village is based on the accounts of Erie adoptees among the Haudenosaunee recorded many years after the Erie were dispersed. Gentaienton, a word meaning "people who carry a field," may refer to a subgroup of the Erie people rather than a physical location.

== History ==
=== Precontact ===
The precontact history of the Erie is characterized by the transition during the Late Woodland period (c. 900–1650) from semi-sedentary bands to an agricultural society centered on large, palisaded villages. This evolution was driven by the adoption of intensive maize cultivation and the increasing necessity of collective defense. Although early ethnographers, such as Horatio Hale and James Mooney, believed that the Iroquoian-speaking peoples of the Great Lakes region migrated north from the southern Appalachian Highlands, archaeologists, including Richard MacNeish, shifted the consensus toward in situ development. The prevailing model now maintains that the Erie developed locally on the Erie Plain and Allegheny Plateau.

There has been a marked shift from seeing the Erie as a single nation to seeing them as an informal alliance of three regional clusters. The "Eastern" Erie, situated on the Erie Plain between the Buffalo River and Cattaraugus Creek, evolved as dispersed Iroquoian bands in the Niagara Frontier coalesced and underwent rapid cultural change during the 14th century. They adopted a material culture and social organization heavily influenced by the Ontario Iroquois Tradition, a framework that describes the cultural evolution of populations north of Lake Erie and Lake Ontario.

In the early 1960s, Marian White identified a "southeastern drift" of two settlement sites away from the Buffalo River. While Iroquoian communities typically moved as local resources were depleted, White noted parallels between these locations and sites found north of Lake Erie. Because the sites south of the Buffalo River so closely resembled assemblages west of the Niagara River, White initially identified them as the easternmost extension of the Neutral Confederacy. Specifically, the presence of Glen Meyer-style pottery led researchers to believe an Ontario Iroquois Tradition population had moved in and displaced local bands. Later, the consensus pivoted toward the view that these Niagara Frontier groups were a distinct Iroquoian entity that had been "culturally overwhelmed" by Ontario Iroquois Tradition influences during the Middleport Phase (1300–1450). This phase represents a rapid shift from scattered hamlets to large, nucleated villages—a process of settlement aggregation that required new social and defensive structures to maintain community stability.

=== 16th century ===
Conversely, the "Central" and "Western" Erie emerged during a late 16th-century ethnogenesis driven by the rapid migration of Iroquoian populations onto the Erie Plain from the Allegheny Plateau. This movement was likely precipitated by the Little Ice Age, which shortened the growing season in the uplands and necessitated a move to the more temperate microclimate near Lake Erie. Bands belonging to the Glaciated Allegheny Plateau tradition migrated north onto the Erie Plain in the area between Cattaraugus Creek and Presque Isle Bay. The Glaciated Allegheny Plateau tradition is a cultural framework that describes the continuous technological and social evolution of populations within the French Creek and Upper Allegheny River watersheds—including the Chautauqua Lake basin—from 1100 to 1600 AD. Its terminal stage, the McFate Phase, is characterized by the construction of small palisaded villages and the production of geometrically incised ceramics.

During this transition, characterized by the abrupt depopulation of the northern Allegheny Plateau in the late 16th century, McFate Phase populations underwent a multi-stage migration. Evidence from sites like Wintergreen Gorge suggests that scattered hamlets in the French Creek watershed first consolidated into a large, palisaded village on the Portage Escarpment before moving as a unified group onto the Erie Plain. This population merged with the plain's sparse in-situ inhabitants to create a settlement cluster south of Presque Isle Bay. Simultaneously, scattered McFate bands living on the glacial lake ridges near Chautauqua Creek—having migrated from the Chautauqua Basin decades earlier—coalesced at a single ridge-top site. This newly unified community subsequently moved onto the plain, possibly establishing a palisaded village on a bluff overlooking Lake Erie.

=== Contact with Europeans ===
The Erie are poorly described in documentary sources. Most of what is known about them during the historical period comes from the Jesuit Relations, which mostly relied on second-hand accounts from Wendat and Onondaga informants.

French interpreter Étienne Brûlé may have been one of the few Europeans to encounter the Erie. In the summer of 1615, while visiting the Wendat, Samuel de Champlain sent Brûlé on a mission to enlist the help of the Carantouanais for an attack on the Haudenosaunee. Traditionally, the Carantouanais have been identified as Susquehannock who lived on the Susquehanna River to the south of Haudenosaunee territory. To reach them, Brûlé, who left no written journals, would have passed through Erie territory. While Brûlé was unable to bring Carantouan warriors in time for the attack, he later reported to Champlain that he spent that autumn and winter "investigating the neighboring nations and regions," which geographically included the Erie.

Virginia fur trader Henry Fleet is thought to have encountered the Erie in 1632. In his journal, Fleet recorded meeting seven "Hereckeenes" at Little Falls on the Potomac River, whom he described as lusty, strangely attired in red fringe and beaver coats, and possessing a haughty manner. Hereckeenes is considered by ethnolinguists to be a cognate of the Wendat exonym Eriehronnon.

=== Post-contact ===
In the mid-17th century, the Erie were devastated by the smallpox and measles epidemics that swept through the Great Lakes region. These European diseases are estimated to have halved the region's Indigenous population. This demographic crisis resulted in sustained Haudenosaunee aggression, driven in part by the practice of "mourning wars"—a cultural tradition of raiding rival nations to take captives for adoption to replace deceased kin. To preserve their own population and social stability, the Haudenosaunee escalated these raids into major military campaigns. These attacks may also have been driven by economic factors: the Haudenosaunee relied on trading beaver pelts for European goods, but by the late 1640s, they had exhausted the beaver population within their own territory. Erie territory occupied prime beaver habitat, making it a high-value target for the Haudenosaunee.

The Relation of 1647–48 records that the Erie had "been compelled to retire far inland to escape their enemies, who are farther to the West." The identity of these western enemies remains a subject of debate. Many writers have assumed the reference points to the Haudenosaunee. The Haudenosaunee, however, lived east of the Erie. It has been suggested that the pressure may have come from the Neutral, who established settlements east of the Niagara River in the early 1640s.

In 1647, the Haudenosaunee launched a massive offensive against the Wendat, leading to the collapse and dispersal of the Wendat Confederacy two years later. Following this victory, the Haudenosaunee turned their attention toward the Neutral. They destroyed a Neutral village in the autumn of 1650 and captured the substantial town of Teotongniaton the following spring. The destruction of Teotongniaton, alongside the death or capture of most of its inhabitants, triggered the rapid collapse of the Neutral Confederacy. Following a two-year lull, the Seneca and Onondaga went to war against the Erie.

While the exact chronology remains vague, the Jesuit Relations detail a cycle of escalation leading to the conflict. A significant number of Wendat and Neutral refugees had joined the Erie. Having witnessed the destruction of their own confederacies, they encouraged the Erie to strike preemptively. A Seneca village was burned, and an Onondaga war party returning from the north was ambushed. An Onondaga hoyane (leader) named Annenraes was captured "almost at the gates" of his own village. The Relation of 1655–56 records that an attempt was made to negotiate peace. A large Erie delegation met with the Onondaga but after an Onondaga was unintentionally killed during a dispute, most of the Erie delegation was slaughtered. A further attempt to prevent war also failed when the wife of one of the slain Erie delegates insisted that an Onondaga captive, presumed to be Annenraes, be put to death instead of permitting his adoption into the tribe. These events made war inevitable. In May 1654, the Onondaga informed the French that they would refrain from raiding French settlements since they were going to "wage a war against the Ehriehronnons, and that this very summer we shall lead an army thither."

The Relation of 1655–56 further describes a major battle that occurred in the summer of 1654. After a five-day flight into the interior to escape the advancing Haudenosaunee, 2,000 Erie warriors, accompanied by their women and children, quickly constructed a palisaded fort to make a final stand. 1,200 mostly Onondaga and Seneca warriors, many armed with flintlock muskets acquired from the Dutch, laid siege to the fort.

The defenders relied mainly on their traditional weaponry. The Jesuits noted the Erie's tactical proficiency, stating they could loose a "hailstorm of poisoned arrows"— eight to ten arrows in the time it took to reload a musket. The narrative also indicates that the Erie possessed at least a few firearms—either "spoils of war" from earlier raids or the few owned by Wendat and Neutral refugees. During the siege, the attackers used their canoes as shields against the Erie's arrows—which were fired with such frequency that the Haudenosaunee could not otherwise approach the walls—and as ladders to scale the palisades. The Haudenosaunee breached the defenses, and as recorded in the Relations, they "entered the fort and there wrought such carnage among the women and children, that blood was knee-deep in certain places."

Attacks on Erie settlements continued. By 1656, however, the Erie Confederacy was no more; its people slaughtered, dispersed or taken captive. The Jesuits noted that most of the captives were women and children who were spared the "execution fires" and were instead distributed among the Onondaga and Seneca to replenish the populations. The Jesuits also recorded the death by fire in November 1655 of an Erie child aged 9 or 10, who was surreptitiously baptised before he was killed.

The degree to which the Erie were assimilated is unclear. The war may have driven more by a policy of annihilation than the traditional practice of mourning wars. The Relations suggest the campaign resulted in a massive loss of life. Some of Erie became refugees or were taken as captives. These captives, primarily women and children who were spared the "execution fires," faced varying fates: some were adopted into Seneca and Onondaga families to replace the dead, some were held as enslaved labor, and others may have been allowed to settle in the multiethnic refugee village of Gandougarae. Over time, many survivors fully integrated into Haudenosaunee society, as exemplified by Catherine Gandeacteua (Gandeaktena), an Erie captive who rose to prominence as a founder of the Saint-François-Xavier mission at La Prairie-de-la-Magdelaine (Kentaké). Although the Erie ceased to exist as a distinct cultural and political entity, their biological legacy survives among the residents of Haudenosaunee communities in New York, Oklahoma, and Ontario.

=== Erie-Richahecrian-Westo connection ===
In 1656, approximately 600–700 well-armed warriors and their families suddenly appeared at the "Falls of the James River" (modern-day Richmond, Virginia). Their arrival alarmed the Virginia colonists, who were still recovering from decades of conflict with the Powhatan Confederacy. Recorded as the Richahecrians, they defeated a combined force of 200 English militia and Pamunkey warriors at the Battle of Bloody Run in 1656.

Although several theories about their origin have been proposed, there is a growing consensus that the Richahecrians were a remnant of the Erie who later moved to the Deep South where they reemerged in the historical record as the Westo.

Anthropologist Marvin T. Smith proposed the Erie identity in his 1987 work, Archaeology of Aboriginal Culture Change in the Interior Southeast. Smith used archaeological patterns to link the sudden appearance of "northern" cultural traits in the South to the dispersed Erie. He noted that the Westo produced notched, shell-tempered pottery that was virtually identical to ceramics found at Erie sites in the north. This style was fundamentally different from the pottery produced by local Mississippian entities. Furthermore, Smith pointed to the Westo’s use of fortified palisades and longhouse architecture—traditional Northern Iroquoian markers—as evidence of a sudden "cultural intrusion" rather than a gradual shift in local traditions.

In The Westo Indians: Slave Traders of the Early Colonial South, Eric E. Bowne significantly expanded on Smith’s "Erie Hypothesis" and argued that the group identified in Virginia as Richahecrians in 1656 were Erie refugees. He traced their migration after their defeat by the Haudenosaunee from Lake Erie down to the James River in Virginia, and eventually to the Savannah River, where they became known as the Westo, a slave-trading society armed with European weaponry.

There is debate regarding when and how the Richahecrians obtained firearms. While some historians follow Eric Bowne’s theory that they acquired them earlier through trade with the Susquehannock, primary accounts of the Battle of Bloody Run in 1656 do not mention the use of muskets, suggesting they achieved their victory with traditional weapons. It was only after settling in the region that they likely acquired firearms—first through "rogue" or illegal frontier traders and eventually through legal, official trade channels as they became integrated into the colonial economy.

The Richahecrians began their career as slave traders almost immediately after their arrival in Virginia. Unlike in the North, where the focus was on the fur trade, the growing plantation economies of Virginia and later Carolina valued enslaved workers more than beaver pelts or deer skins. In order to secure a steady supply of muskets, gunpowder and lead, the Richahecrians needed to provide the one commodity the colonists valued more than furs—slaves. In July 1661, while still based in Virginia, a Richahecrian war party traveled as far south as the Altamaha River in Georgia. They destroyed the Spanish mission of Santo Domingo de Talaje and captured unarmed Guale to sell back to traders in Virginia.

Following the success of long-distance raids like the 1661 attack on Santo Domingo de Talaje, the group migrated south from Virginia to the Savannah River. This move brought them closer to the Spanish mission tribes, who provided a steady source of captives. They established a palisaded village called Hickauhaugau near the river’s fall line—the point where the river becomes impassable to upstream navigation. This strategic location allowed them to become the region's dominant geopolitical power.

In 1674, the Westo solidified their power through a formal alliance with the newly established colony of Carolina. The explorer Henry Woodward visited Hickauhaugau to negotiate a trade monopoly: the Westo would provide the English with Indigenous captives to work on plantations in exchange for a consistent, legal supply of modern guns and ammunition. This partnership turned the Westo into the most feared military force in the Southeast, as they were the only tribe in the region with muskets.

The Westo’s dominance eventually made colonial leaders nervous. While the Lords Proprietors in England sought to protect the Westo to maintain their own lucrative trade monopoly, a local planter faction known as the Goose Creek Men pressured the government to eliminate them. These colonists saw the Westo as an obstacle to their own expansion and trade with interior tribes. Between 1680 and 1682, the colonists decided to break the Westo monopoly by starting a conflict known as the Westo War. The English stopped selling powder and lead to the Westo and instead armed a rival group of Shawnee known locally as the Savannah. Unable to use their muskets, the Westo were quickly defeated and their village was destroyed. Many survivors were captured and sold into slavery in the Caribbean, while others fled into the interior and were absorbed into the emerging Muscogee Creek Confederacy. A significant number may have returned north; the Jesuit Relations record that several hundred refugees from La Nation du Chat voluntarily surrendered to the Haudenosaunee in 1682 and were integrated into their society. With their dispersal, the Westo ceased to exist as a distinct cultural entity.
