= Wyandotte Nation =

Federally recognized Native American tribe in Oklahoma

Wyandotte Nation Wyandotte Nation of Oklahoma
- Indian reservation
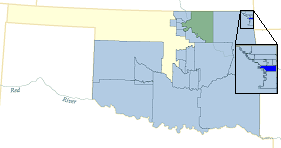
- Location (Blue) in the U.S. state of Oklahoma

- Location in the Oklahoma Wyandotte Nation (the United States)
- Coordinates: 36°47′41″N 94°43′02″W
- Capital: Wyandotte

Government
  - Type: Tribal Council
  - Chief: Billy Friend
  - Second Chief: Norman Hildebrand, Jr

Population (2022)
  - Total: 6,883
- Demonym: Wyandot
- Time zone: UTC-6
  - Summer (DST): UTC-5 (CDT)
- Area codes: 539/918
- Website: https://wyandotte-nation.org/

The Wyandotte Nation is the only federally recognized Native American tribe of Wyandot people in the United States. Descended from the Petun and Wendat Confederacy, the Wyandotte formed after the dispersal of both peoples by the Haudenosaunee during the Beaver Wars. Originally dwelling near Georgian Bay in Ontario, pressure from the Haudenosaunee, then later from European settlers and the United States government, drove the nation south and west to Michigan, Ohio, Kansas, and finally Oklahoma in the United States. As of 2025, just over 7000 people were enrolled in the Wyandotte Nation.

== Name and Identity ==
The nation's traditional name in its own language is Waⁿdát (often rendered Wendat). The nation was renamed "Wyandot" or "Wyandotte" after merging with related groups from the northeastern woodlands in the seventeenth century. The name is commonly thought to mean "dwellers on a peninsula" or "islanders".

The nation's flag is white, with a central turtle emblem. The turtle, an earth symbol in the nation's creation stories, carries a peace pipe and war club representing peace and war, with willow branches signifying lasting life. A twelve‑pointed shield on the turtle's shell symbolizes the nation's clans, and a central council fire alludes to its traditional role as "Keepers of the Council Fire."

== Government ==
Map of Wyandotte Nation's tribal jurisdictional area (OTSA) and nearby jurisdiction areas.

The Wyandotte Nation is a federally recognized Indian tribe in the United States. Under U.S. federal law, the Wyandotte Nation can participate in all programs and services provided to American Indians. The nation exercises inherent sovereignty and the "self-evident right to govern [itself]."

=== Administration ===
As of 2025, the current administration is:

- Chief: Billy Friend
- Second Chief: Norman Hildebrand, Jr.
- Council Person: Vivian Fink
- Council Person: Eric Lofland
- Council Person: Rob Nesvold
- Council Person: Keith Gray

The chief serves a four-year term.

=== Land and Sovereignty ===
The Wyandotte Nation’s tribal jurisdictional area is located in Ottawa County, Oklahoma, with its headquarters in the town of Wyandotte. Beyond Oklahoma, the Nation also controls the Wyandot National Burying Ground in Kansas City, Kansas.

In 2019, the Wyandot Mission Church and its three acres of land in Upper Sandusky, Ohio were returned to the Wyandotte Nation by the United Methodist Church.

=== Government Services ===
The Wyandotte Nation operates two main health and wellness sites: the Bearskin Health and Wellness Center and the Bearskin Fitness Center. The Nation also operates environmental services, including the Lost Creek Recycling Center, managed by the tribe's Environmental Department and Planning and Natural Resources Department. The nation has its own newspaper, The Turtle Speaks.

The Wyandotte Nation issues its own tribal vehicle tags and operates its own housing authority. It has a ten-man police department providing 24-hour law enforcement response to the Nation and surrounding area.

== Demographics ==
As of May 2025, 7,254 people were enrolled citizens of the nation. Enrollment is based in lineal descent; that is, the nation has no minimum blood quantum requirement. This broad definition of enrollment was partially driven by negotiations between Chief Leaford Bearskin and the Bureau of Indian Affairs when determining eligibility for settlement compensation, as the BIA requested that the Wyandotte must distribute the settlement to all Wyandotte descendants regardless of blood quantum. This requirement is similar to other nations, such as the Cherokee Nation and Choctaw Nation.

Only about 25 percent of enrolled Wyandottes live within the state of Oklahoma. In 2011, 1,218 of the 4,957 Wyandotte citizens lived in Oklahoma.

== Economic Development ==
The Nation operates several gaming enterprises. Two of them, River Bend Casino & Hotel and Lucky Turtle Casino, are located in Wyandotte, Oklahoma. The nation also owns two casinos in Kansas: the 7th Street Casino in the former Scottish Rite Masonic Temple in Kansas City, Kansas and the Cross Winds Casino in Park City, Kansas.

The Nation also operates retail locations. It owns a truck stop, Turtle Stop fuel stations, and a smoke shop.

== Culture ==
The tribe's annual powwow is held in Oklahoma in September and features traditional dances, regalia, music, food vendors, and other family-friendly activities. It is a three day event that attracts dancers and drum groups from around the country. Dances include shawl dancing, fancy dancing, gourd dancing, and stomp dance.

=== Language ===
Today, most members speak English. Although the last native speaker died in 1972, the Wyandot language is the subject of ongoing revitalization efforts. The Wyandotte Nation offers preschool and elementary‑level Wyandot classes and has developed online lessons for self‑study.

== History ==
The Wyandotte Nation descends from multiple groups: the Tionontati (Petun), the Wendats (Hurons), the Wenro, the Attiwandaronk (Neutrals) and the Erie. The Wyandotte Nation has continuity to the first Wendat Confederacy. This confederacy was created around 1400 CE, when the Attignawantan (Bear Nation) and Attigingueenongnahac (Cord People) combined forces. They, in turn, were joined by the Arendaronon (People of the Rocks), Ataronchronon (People of One Lodge), and the Tahontaenrat (Deer Nation). Archaeologists have excavated a number of large, 16th-century settlements north of Lake Ontario, including the Mantle Site, northeast of Toronto, suggesting that this may have been a location for the coalescence of the Wendat people. These ancestors of the Wyandottes later migrated further north to the area near Georgian Bay, where they were encountered by French explorers in the early 17th century.

=== Early European contact ===
The key historical record for this period is The Jesuit Relations, which describes the groups that would become the Wyandotte. At this time, the Wendat were fierce enemies of the nations of the Haudenosaunee Confederacy, then based in present-day New York. The Wendat allied more closely with the French while the Haudenosaunee allied more closely with the Dutch and later the British.

Eventually the Wendat Confederacy was devastated by smallpox epidemics and became seriously weakened during the early decades of the early 17th century. After the third and most deadly epidemic of smallpox, the Wendat population was reduced from about 18,000 in 1634 to about 9,000 people in 1640 From 1648-1649, the Haudenosaunee killed many of the remaining Wendat. As they fled, many of the remaining Wendat "died by the hundreds" from starvation and lost most of their valuables, such as furs.

Some Wendat moved east into Quebec and became the present-day Wendat Nation. Others went west as refugees within other communities that were enemies of the Haudenosaunee such as the Wenro, Petun, and Neutrals. The Haudenosaunee pursued the Wendat within these communities and dispersed them as well, forcing them to head farther west to lands occupied by the Ho-Chunk, Menominee, and Dakota. For some time, they settled with Odawa and Illinois tribes. These Wendat survivors and the other refugees from the Haudenosaunee formed a new, unified group, known as the Wyandot or Wyandotte. This group, which was mostly Petun, is the group from which today's Wyandotte Nation descends.

These ancestors of the Wyandotte Nation spent most of the second half of the seventeenth century looking for a new home, traveling as far as Michilimackinac in Michigan and the Apostle Islands and Rock Island in Wisconsin. They returned east to present-day Detroit, where the ancestors of the present-day Wyandot of Anderdon Nation split from the Wyandotte Nation and remain today.

=== 18th-century developments ===
By the beginning of the 18th century, the Wyandotte people had moved into the Ohio River Valley. Around 1745, large groups settled near Upper Sandusky, Ohio. These Ohio Wyandots, dominated by former Wenro became more distinct from those who remained at Detroit, who were more former Petun. By the end of the 18th century, the Ohio Wyandots (who would become the Wyandotte Nation) were the dominant community.

The area around Ohio seemed safe from colonial expansion, as the Royal Proclamation of 1763 at the end of the French and Indian War suggested that colonists could not expand west of the Appalachians. Even after more territory was opened to colonists in the 1768 Treaty of Fort Stanwix, Wyandottes in Upper Sandusky were far from any borders with colonists. After the American Revolution, some newly independent Americans were eager to expand beyond the terms laid down by the British. Some Wyandottes signed the Treaty of Fort McIntosh with the United States in 1785 to confirm their landholdings and appease the Americans. Many felt that the Wyandottes were secure, given that the Ohio River had been considered a natural boundary between the Great Lakes and American settlers.

==== Northwest Indian War ====
Despite this treaty, the Kentucky militia attacked Native Americans in incidents such as Logan's raid to begin the Northwest Indian War. The Wyandottes joined the Indigenous Northwestern Confederacy and at first argued for conciliation with the United States, but later joined raids against the Americans. The Wyandottes were part of the Confederacy throughout the war, including at St. Clair's defeat in 1791, one of the American army’s worst defeats in history. But the war turned against the Indigenous coalition. The Wyandottes asked for help from the British, were joined by a few volunteers from the Canadian militia, but were ultimately defeated at the Battle of Fallen Timbers in 1794.

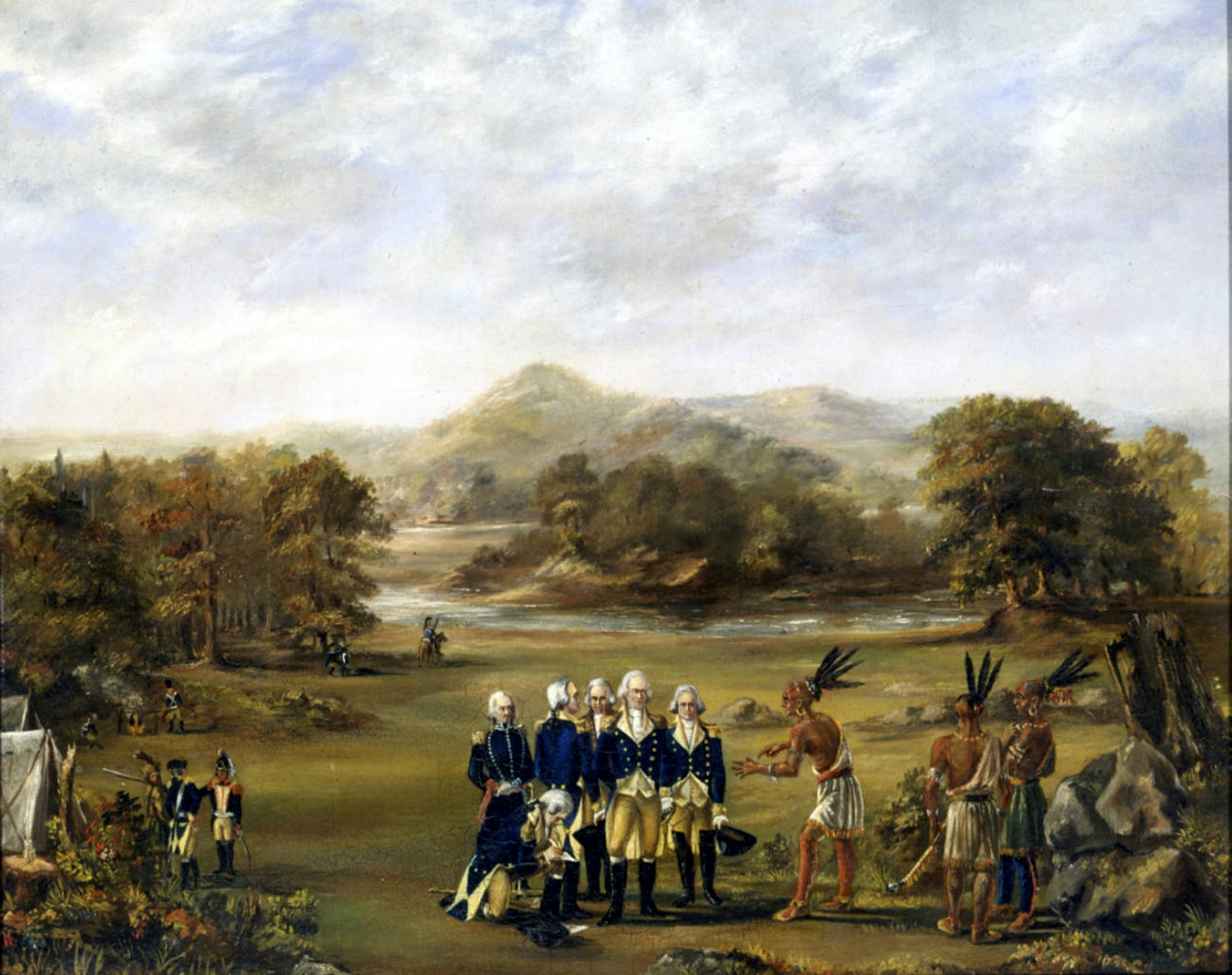
The Wyandottes ceded much of their land to the United States under the Treaty of Greenville

After this defeat, the Wyandottes were among the first to advocate for peace among the coalition. Under their chief Tarhe, they negotiated a peace at Greenville in 1795. The chief declared the United States to be the Wyandottes "Father," with Tarhe telling the American commander, Major General Anthony Wayne about his "happiness in becoming your children" and asking the American government to now "take care of all your little ones." The Wyandottes lost most of their territory under the Treaty of Greenville.

=== 19th-century developments ===
After the Treaty of Greenville, the Wyandottes were divided on whether to pursue war or peace with the United States. While Tarhe preferred peace, the war chief Roundhead took a leading role in Tecumseh's confederacy against the United States during the War of 1812. Allied with British forces led by Colonel Henry Procter, Roundhead led Wyandottes and other Indigenous warriors in a victory over the Americans at the Battle of Frenchtown. But the Wyandottes and the British eventually suffered defeat at the Battle of the Thames. With Roundhead and Tecumseh dead, the Wyandottes sued for peace. During the war, the British had sought an "Indian barrier state" that would include Wyandotte lands and stop American expansion, but the Americans rejected this in the 1814 Treaty of Ghent. Three years later, the Treaty of Fort Meigs reduced Wyandotte lands drastically, leaving the people only small parcels in Ohio and the Michigan territory.

After the War of 1812, the American policy of settler colonialism was formalized in the Indian Removal Act of 1830 under Andrew Jackson. The American government's goal was to "acquire the countries occupied by the red men of the South and West [including the Wyandotte] . . . and . . . to send them to [another] land." The policy reached the Wyandotte in 1842, when the Wyandottes ceded all their land east of the Mississippi River. The Wyandottes made a treaty with the U.S. government by which it was to be compensated for its lands. The tribe was removed to the Delaware Reservation in present-day Kansas, then considered Indian Territory. During this migration and the early months, it suffered much illness. In 1843, survivors buried their dead on a high ridge overlooking the Missouri River in what became the Huron Cemetery in present-day Kansas City, Kansas. In 1971 it was listed on the National Register of Historic Places. It was renamed Wyandot National Burying Ground.

After the American Civil War, Wyandotte people who had not become citizens of the United States in 1855 in Kansas were removed a final time in 1867 to present-day Oklahoma. They were settled on 20,000 acres (81 km^{2}) in the northeast corner of Indian Territory. The Seneca, Shawnee, and Wyandotte Industrial Boarding School, also called the Wyandotte Mission, opened for classes in Wyandotte, Oklahoma in 1872.

In 1893, the Dawes Act required that the tribal communal holdings in the Indian Territory be divided into individual allotments. The land was divided among the 241 tribal citizens listed on the Dawes Rolls. The Wyandotte citizens in Oklahoma retained some tribal structure, and still had control of the communal property of the Huron Cemetery, which by then annexed into Kansas City, Kansas.

=== 20th century ===
In 1937, seizing the opportunity presented by the US Oklahoma Indian Welfare Act of 1934 to regain tribal structure and self-government, citizens of the Wyandotte tribe organized into the Wyandotte Nation. The act enabled Native Americans to hold property in common again, and to develop self-government and sovereignty.

From the 1950s-1970s, the Wyandotte's federal recognition was in jeopardy. On August 1, 1956, the US Congress passed Public Law ch. 843, 70 Stat. 893 to terminate the Wyandotte Tribe of Oklahoma as part of the federal Indian termination policy. Three years were allotted for completing the termination. One of the stipulations required that a parcel of land in Kansas City, Kansas, reserved as the Huron Cemetery, which had been awarded to the Wyandot by treaty on January 31, 1855, was to be sold by the United States. Litigation was filed by a group of Absentee Wyandot against the United States and Kansas City, prohibiting the federal government from fulfilling the terms of the termination statute and ultimately preventing the termination of the Wyandotte Nation. The Bureau of Land Management records confirm that the Federal Register never published the termination of the Wyandotte lands and thus they were never officially terminated.

Congress later restored several Oklahoma Tribes, including the Wyandotte. On May 15, 1978, in a single Act titled Public Law 95-281, the termination laws were repealed, and the three tribes were reinstated with all rights and privileges they had prior to termination. In 1983, former civil servant Leaford Bearskin was elected chief. The next year, he led the Wyandottes in receiving compensation for eight million acres of Ohio land, which gave the Wyandottes a trust fund to operate the government. This was the first time in U.S. history that a tribe had succeeded in a settlement like this, including their right to administer the trust. He also moved the government offices from Miami, Oklahoma to Wyandotte.

The tribe later changed the Nation's name to simply "Wyandotte Nation" by the time of the Nation's 1999 Constitution.

The twentieth century also saw a century-long dispute over the Huron Cemetery, which the Wyandot Nation of Kansas wanted to preserve for cultural activities, while the Wyandotte Nation's preferences shifted over time. In 1998, after more than 100 years of disagreement, the two organizations agreed to use the Huron Cemetery only for religious, cultural, or other compatible sacred activities.

=== 21st century ===
In August 1999, the Wyandotte Nation joined the contemporary Wendat Confederacy, together with the Wyandot Nation of Kansas, the Huron-Wendat Nation of Wendake (Quebec), and the Wyandot of Anderdon Nation in Michigan. The tribes pledged to provide mutual aid to each other in a spirit of peace, kinship, and unity.

This followed an important meeting of Huronia reconciliation in Midland, Ontario, Canada, attended by representatives of the Haudenosaunee Confederacy, Wyandotte nations, British, French, Dutch, Anglican Church, and Catholic Jesuit brothers. The weekend of events was organized by the Huronia Reconciliation Committee.

== See also ==
- Related and historic groups:
  - Wyandot Nation of Kansas
  - The Huron-Wendat Nation of Wendake (Quebec)
  - The Wyandot of Anderdon Nation
- Predecessors:
  - Wyandot people, for early tribal history in Ohio, which included these predecessors:
    - Petun
    - Wendat (Huron)
    - Neutral
    - Erie
    - Wenro
- Notable members:
  - Silas Armstrong (1810–1865), chief of the Wyandotte Nation
  - Leaford Bearskin (1921–2012), chief of the Wyandotte Nation (1983–2011)
  - Matthew Mudeater (1812–1878), chief of the Wyandotte Nation
  - Bertrand N. O. Walker (1870–1927), writer who published under his Wyandotte name, Hen-Toh
