= Wyandot of Anderdon Nation =

Cultural heritage group and nonprofit in Michigan

- The Wyandot of Anderdon Nation

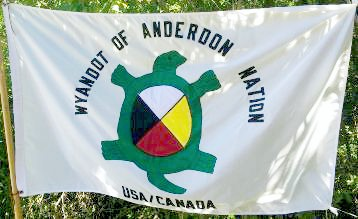
- Named after: Wyandot People and Anderdon Township
- Formation: 1973
- Type: Nonprofit
- Purpose: P20: Human Service Organizations
- Headquarters: Trenton, Michigan
- Members: 900+
- Grand Chief: Ted Roll
- Website: wyandotofanderdon.com

The Wyandot of Anderdon Nation is a self-identifying tribe and nonprofit organization headquartered in Trenton, Michigan, on the Detroit River.

== History ==
The Wyandot people have lived along the Detroit River since the early 18th century. The Wyandot fought alongside the French in the French and Indian War, and they fought on the side of the British in the American Revolutionary War. After the Revolutionary War, the Wyandot claims to land along the Detroit River were not honored by Congress when they petitioned in February 1812 for their land. The Wyandot subsequently fought on the side of the British in the War of 1812, disrupting the American supply line to the city of Detroit. Partly in response to the Wyandot siding with the British, the Wyandot were removed from their remaining villages along the Detroit River to a reservation on the Huron River in 1816. In 1842, most of the remaining Wyandot were forced to travel to reservations in Kansas, but a small group of Wyandot eventually returned to their lands along the Detroit River. The descendants of that group of Wyandot make up the modern-day Wyandot of Anderdon Nation.

== Nonprofit ==
In 1973, the Wyandot of Anderdon Nation incorporated as a 501(c)(3) nonprofit organization based in Trenton.

In 2024, its administration included:

- Grand Chief: Ted Roll
- Treasurer: Sue Szachta
- Secretary: Linda Filipek

== Land ==
In 2015, the Wyandotte Nation, a federally recognized tribe headquartered in Oklahoma, purchased a 15-acre land parcel, the Six Points property in Gibraltar, Michigan, and leased this land to the Wyandot of Anderdon Nation.
