= Wyandotte, Oklahoma =

- Town
- Motto: "Preserving The Future Of Our Past"
- Location within Ottawa County and Oklahoma
- Coordinates: 36°47′41″N 94°43′02″W
- Country: United States
- State: Oklahoma
- County: Ottawa

Area
  - Total: 1.36 sq mi (3.52 km^{2})
  - Land: 1.36 sq mi (3.52 km^{2})
  - Water: 0 sq mi (0.00 km^{2})
- Elevation: 768 ft (234 m)

Population (2020)
  - Total: 488
  - Density: 358.9/sq mi (138.56/km^{2})
- Time zone: UTC-6 (Central (CST))
  - Summer (DST): UTC-5 (CDT)
- ZIP code: 74370
- Area codes: 539/918
- FIPS code: 40-82250
- GNIS feature ID: 2413515

Wyandotte is a town in Ottawa County, Oklahoma, United States. As of the 2020 census, Wyandotte had a population of 488. The town is the tribal headquarters of the Wyandotte Nation of Oklahoma, for which the town was named.

== History ==
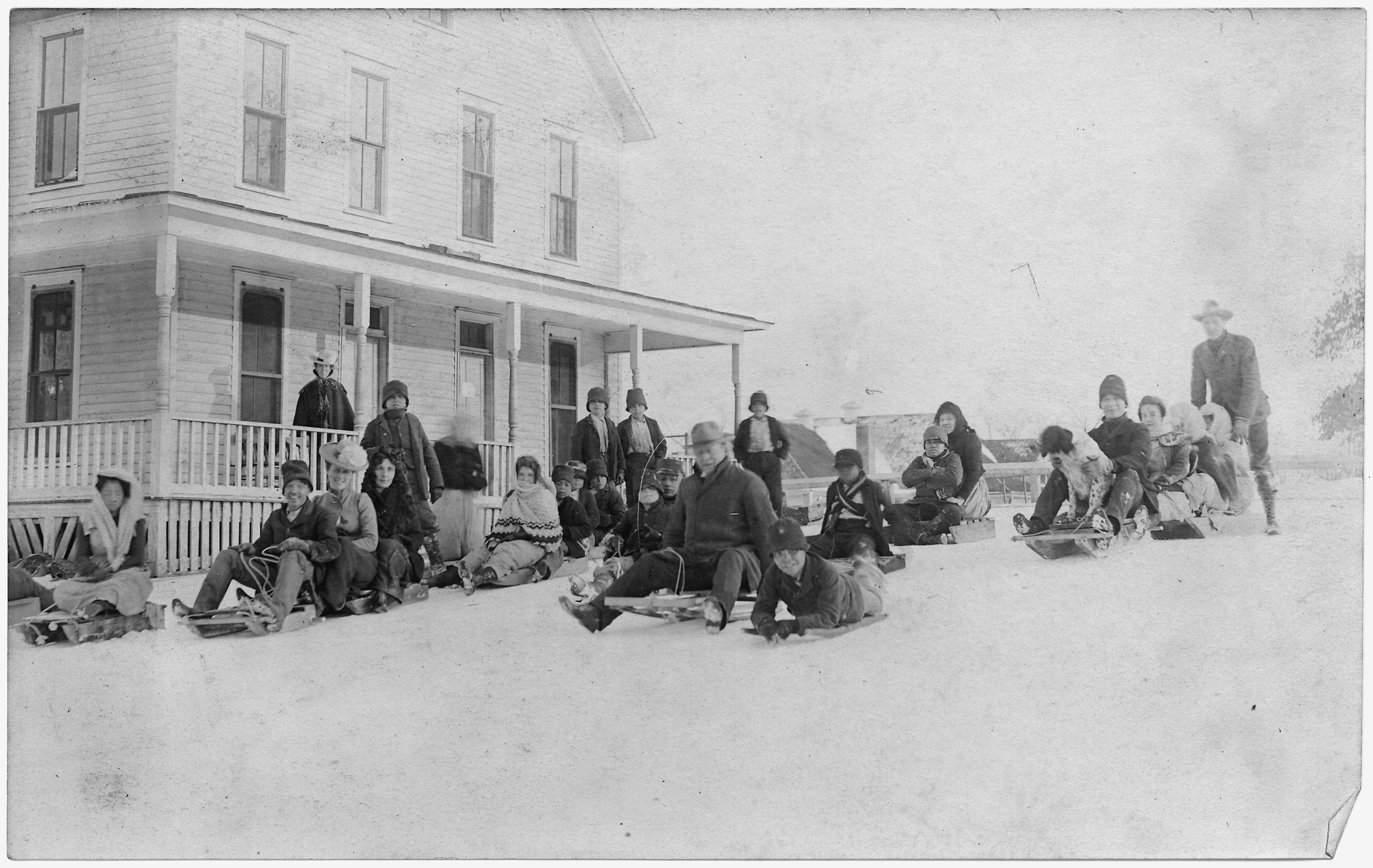
Seneca Indian School in 1905

The Wyandotte tribe was removed to this area in 1867. The Society of Friends (Quakers) established a mission here in 1869, and the Wyandotte Tribal Council donated land for the Quakers to establish a boarding school for Seneca, Shawnee and Wyandotte children. Construction of the school began in 1871 and classes began in 1872. Originally named Prairie City, the post office was renamed to the city's current name in 1894.

In the mid 1920s, Wyandotte was nationally known for having an all-female city government due to changes in the electorate of the town after the passage of the Nineteenth Amendment. The mayor of the town during this period, Mamie Foster, served for over five years as Oklahoma's first female mayor.

In the late 1930s, the Federal Government built Pensacola Dam, which created Grand Lake o' the Cherokees. Although the lake took away part of Wyandotte's land, it added business in the form of residential development and tourist industry. This caused a resumption of population growth.

In 1966, town officials discovered that Wyandotte had never filed incorporation papers. They petitioned the Ottawa County Board of Commissioners for an election, which was approved. A majority voted for incorporation, which became effective in April 1966.

== Geography ==
Wyandotte is located 12 miles (19 km) southeast of Miami.

According to the United States Census Bureau, the town has a total area of 0.5 square miles (1.3 km^{2}), all land.

== Demographics ==
Historical population
| Census | Pop. | Note | %± |
|---|---|---|---|
| 1900 | 224 | | — |
| 1910 | 255 | | 13.8% |
| 1920 | 274 | | 7.5% |
| 1930 | 271 | | −1.1% |
| 1940 | 348 | | 28.4% |
| 1950 | 242 | | −30.5% |
| 1960 | 226 | | −6.6% |
| 1970 | 297 | | 31.4% |
| 1980 | 336 | | 13.1% |
| 1990 | 356 | | 6.0% |
| 2000 | 363 | | 2.0% |
| 2010 | 333 | | −8.3% |
| 2020 | 488 | | 46.5% |
U.S. Decennial Census

Wyandotte is part of the Joplin, Missouri metropolitan area.

=== 2020 census ===
As of the 2020 census, Wyandotte had a population of 488. The median age was 37.6 years. 28.3% of residents were under the age of 18 and 22.1% of residents were 65 years of age or older. For every 100 females there were 82.8 males, and for every 100 females age 18 and over there were 85.2 males age 18 and over.

0.0% of residents lived in urban areas, while 100.0% lived in rural areas.

There were 210 households in Wyandotte, of which 33.8% had children under the age of 18 living in them. Of all households, 37.1% were married-couple households, 19.0% were households with a male householder and no spouse or partner present, and 37.1% were households with a female householder and no spouse or partner present. About 30.5% of all households were made up of individuals and 16.2% had someone living alone who was 65 years of age or older.

There were 238 housing units, of which 11.8% were vacant. The homeowner vacancy rate was 1.8% and the rental vacancy rate was 4.4%.

Racial composition as of the 2020 census
| Race | Number | Percent |
|---|---|---|
| White | 228 | 46.7% |
| Black or African American | 1 | 0.2% |
| American Indian and Alaska Native | 185 | 37.9% |
| Asian | 0 | 0.0% |
| Native Hawaiian and Other Pacific Islander | 1 | 0.2% |
| Some other race | 5 | 1.0% |
| Two or more races | 68 | 13.9% |
| Hispanic or Latino (of any race) | 18 | 3.7% |

=== 2000 census ===
As of the census of 2000, there were 363 people, 128 households, and 93 families residing in the town. The population density was 739.6 inhabitants per square mile (285.6/km^{2}). There were 148 housing units at an average density of 301.5 per square mile (116.4/km^{2}). The racial makeup of the town was 63.36% White, 29.75% Native American, 0.28% Asian, 1.10% from other races, and 5.51% from two or more races. Hispanic or Latino of any race were 2.20% of the population.

There were 128 households, out of which 39.8% had children under the age of 18 living with them, 53.1% were married couples living together, 12.5% had a female householder with no husband present, and 27.3% were non-families. 25.0% of all households were made up of individuals, and 17.2% had someone living alone who was 65 years of age or older. The average household size was 2.84 and the average family size was 3.39.

In the town, the population was spread out, with 35.5% under the age of 18, 5.2% from 18 to 24, 24.8% from 25 to 44, 20.7% from 45 to 64, and 13.8% who were 65 years of age or older. The median age was 32 years. For every 100 females, there were 90.1 males. For every 100 females age 18 and over, there were 87.2 males.

The median income for a household in the town was $23,281, and the median income for a family was $27,321. Males had a median income of $25,938 versus $15,625 for females. The per capita income for the town was $10,315. About 17.2% of families and 22.8% of the population were below the poverty line, including 35.9% of those under age 18 and 8.2% of those age 65 or over.

== Education ==
- Wyandotte Public Schools serves the town and surrounding areas with elementary, middle, and high school education.

All of the municipality is in that school district.

== Oklahoma D-Day ==
Every year in June, Wyandotte hosts one of the largest scenario paintball games in the world; up to 5,000 players attend annually. It is played at the D-Day Adventure Park, a privately owned 740 acres (3.0 km^{2}) of thickly wooded terrain.

== Places of Interest ==
- Grand Lake `O Cherokees is formed by Pensacola Dam between the towns of Langley and Disney Oklahoma from three rivers, the Neosho and Spring Rivers from the north, and the Elk River from the east. It covers 59,000 acres, and has 1,300 miles of shoreline. It is a popular spot for bass fishing, boating, and water sports.
- Twin Bridges State Park sits west of Wyandotte at the junction of US-60/OK-137, and between the Neosho and Spring Rivers. The park offers boat access to Grand Lake, fishing, camping, and other immensities.

== Transportation ==
=== Highways ===
Wyandotte is served by US-60.

=== Railroads ===
The Burlington Northern & Santa Fe Railway (BNSF) Cherokee Subdivision runs through Wyandotte. The BNSF Cherokee Subdivision runs between Springfield Missouri to the east, and Tulsa Oklahoma to the west.
