= Wyandot Nation of Kansas =

Cultural organization in Kansas

Wyandot Nation of Kansas, Wyandotte Nation of Kansas
- Named after: Wyandot people; state of Kansas
- Formation: nonprofit: 2020
- Founded at: Kansas City, KS
- Type: nonprofit organization
- Tax ID no.: EIN 48-1156633
- Location: Kansas City, KS, United States
- Official language: English
- Revenue: $0 (2021)
- Expenses: 0 (2021)
- Website: wyandot.org

The Wyandot Nation of Kansas is a self-identifying tribe and nonprofit organization headquartered in Kansas City, Kansas. They identify as being Wyandot.

== History ==
An 1855 treaty attempted to dissolve the Wyandot tribe, but not all members agreed to leave the tribe by accepting United States citizenship. A contingent of these members was given land in an 1867 treaty with the United States government, which now forms the federally recognized Wyandotte Nation, but a smaller contingent of members of the Wyandot Tribe remained in Kansas and attempted to remain eligible for membership in the tribe.

=== Huron Cemetery ===
In 1907, Lyda Conley, a descendant of a Wyandot member, sued to prevent the sale of the Huron Indian Cemetery, a case which reached the Supreme Court. While Conley lost this case, and other cases brought by the members of the Wyandot Nation of Kansas to prevent the sale of the cemetery were unsuccessful, U.S. Congress, led by Charles Curtis (Kaw/Osage/Prairie Potawatomi), repealed the law authorizing the sale of the cemetery.

In 1994, Leaford Bearskin, chief of the Wyandotte Nation, proposed the idea of using the disputed cemetery land for a casino.

In 1998, the Wyandot Nation of Kansas and the Wyandotte Nation signed an agreement to preserve the cemetery as a cemetery and permanently prohibit the use of the land for a casino.

=== Petition for recognition ===
On May 12, 1994, Janith English of Prairie Village, Kansas, sent a letter of intent to petition the federal government for recognition; however, a completed petition was never submitted.

In 2017, the United States Court of Appeals for the Federal Circuit rejected the argument by the Wyandot Nation of Kansas' argument that they already were a federally recognized tribe in the lawsuit Wyandot Nation of Kansas v. United States.

=== Nonprofit organization ===
In 2020, the group chartered the Wyandotte Nation of Kansas, a nonprofit organization based in Kansas City, Kansas. Their tax-exempt classification is for "arts, culture, and humanities," and their tax-exempt activity is "cultural, ethnic awareness."

== Notable members ==
- Richard Zane Smith
