= Zane family =

American settler family

The Zane family was important to the early history and settlement of Western Virginia and the U.S. state of Ohio. Brothers Ebenezer (1747–1811) and Isaac Zane both served in the Virginia House of Delegates before moving westward. They laid out sections of the Ohio Country, including the municipalities of Zanesville and Zanesfield. Their sister Betty Zane (1759–1823), was a heroine of the Revolutionary War.

Then Zane family is originally from England.

- Robert Zane was born in 1643 in Yarcombe, Devonshire, England. He married Margaret Hammon in November, 1664 in Dublin, Ireland. Margaret Hammon was born in 1641 in Middle, Yorkshire, England. She died around 1672–1673. The place is unknown but probably in Dublin, Ireland. Robert died in January or February of 1695 in Newton, Gloucester, New Jersey.
- Nathanial Zane, was born in Dublin, Ireland, on October 24, 1670. He married Grace Rakestraw on August 27, 1697, in Philadelphia, Pennsylvania, after immigrating to New York. He died in 1727 in Newton, Gloucester, New Jersey.
- William Andrew Zane was born on November 26, 1712, in Newton, Gloucester, New Jersey. He died in 1799 in Wheeling, Ohio. He was married to Nancy Ann Nolan, who was born in 1715 in Newton, Gloucester, New Jersey.
- Isaac Zane (November 26, 1753 – May 6, 1816) was the owner of Old Forge Farm on Opequon Creek and founder of Zanesville, Ohio. Around 1762, he was kidnapped at age nine as a child by Wyandot Indians from his family home near Moorefield, Virginia. He was adopted into the tribe and lived with them for 17 years. He married Myeerah (“White Crane”), the daughter of Chief Tarhe in 1771 in Wheeling, Ohio, ergo had a prominent position within the tribe. Myeerah died in Zanesfield, Logan County, Ohio, on August 23, 1823.

Isaac & Myeerah gave birth to their son, Isaac Zane in 1777, in Zanesfield, Logan County, Ohio. He died on May 12, 1890, in Marseilles, Wyandott, Ohio. He was married to Hannah Dickinson, born on November 25, 1797, in Berks County, Pennsylvania. She died on November 14, 1886, in Quandary, Wyandotte, Kansas.

Isaac and Hannah also gave birth to Ebenezer O. Zane, in March 1824. Ebenezer O. Zane married Rebecca Ann Barnes, born on November 15, 1827, in Beaver, Pennsylvania. She died on Marsh 26, 1916, in Kansas City, Wyandotte, Kansas. Ebenezer and Rebecca gave birth to several children. On March 20, 1847, Isaac O Zane was born in Ohio. He died in Ottawa, Kansas, on July 25, 1913. He had several siblings: Joseph, Edward, Hanna, Kate, Emma and William. He married Sara (maiden name unknown). DOB: May 11, (date unknown).

Sara and Isaac O. Zane, gave birth to Lawrence G. Zane on May 13, 1873, in Mississippi. He died on February 12, 1902. He married Maud Chenowith, born 1875 in Illinois, and died in 1974 in Kansas. Laurence was given a land grant by Woodrow Wilson, in Colorado due to his membership in the Wyandotte tribe.

Lawrence Gus Zane, was born in 1901 in the Kansas Territory. He died in 1938 while working for the railroad in an oil boom town called Ramona, Oklahoma. He was married to Lulu Mini Rodecker, born in 1902 in Arkansas. She was a member of the Cherokee Nation of Oklahoma. Lulu died in June, 1994. She had two children: Betty Virginia Zane, born on November 22, 1933, and Herbert Donald Zane, born in 1922. Both children grew up in Ramona. Herbert Donald Zane served in World War I. He had no children.

Betty Virginia Zane, had one child. betty married Joseph Amos Nichols, a Tulsa, Oklahoma, attorney born in 1913. Amos died in 1966. Their daughter was named Virginia Lu Nichols, born February 1966. Virginia married John Allen Frank, of Littleton, Colorado in 1989.

- Hannah Zane, mother of Elizabeth Burton Zane.
- Elizabeth Burton (Zane) Conley (1838–1879), Isaac's granddaughter, was a multi-racial member of the Wyandots and mother of the Conley sisters (Lyda, Helena, and Ida), born in Logan County, Ohio. They saved the Wyandot National Burying Ground in Kansas City.
- Zane Grey (1872–1939), a popular author of Western novels, was the latest notable figure of the family. Grey's mother was a Zane descendant. She named him Zane in honor of this maternal line.

Natalie Zane Babbitt (1932 – October 31, 2016) Author of Tuck Everlasting, is the latest notable figure of the Family.

Other places named for the family include:

- Zane Township, Logan County, Ohio
- Zane's Trace, an early road running through Ohio from Wheeling, West Virginia, to Maysville, Kentucky.
