= Mother Solomon =

Wyandot nanny (1816–1890)

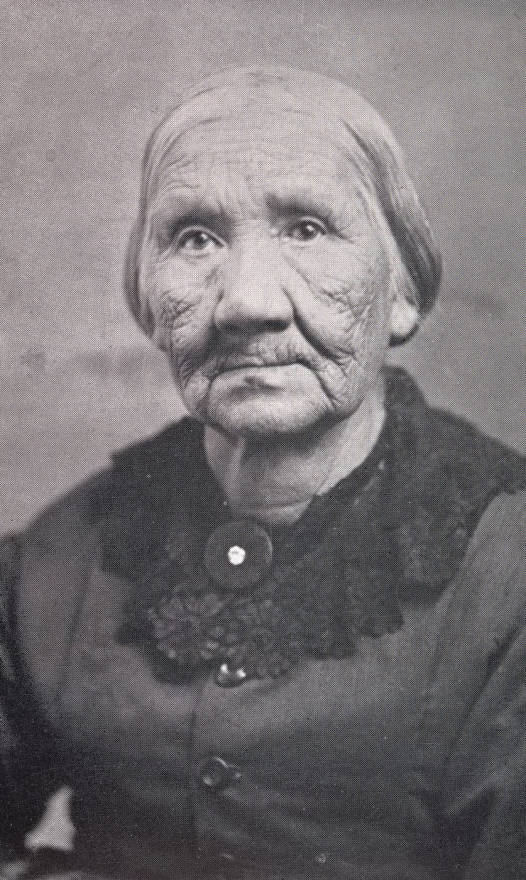
- Solomon c. 1880
- Born: Margaret Grey Eyes; November 1816; Owl Creek, Ohio, U.S.
- Died: August 18, 1890 (aged 73); Wyandot County, Ohio, U.S.
- Resting place: Wyandot Mission Church, Upper Sandusky, Ohio, U.S.
- Occupation: Nanny
- Spouses: David Young (m. 1833; d. 1851) John Solomon (m. 1860; d. 1876)
- Children: 8

Signature
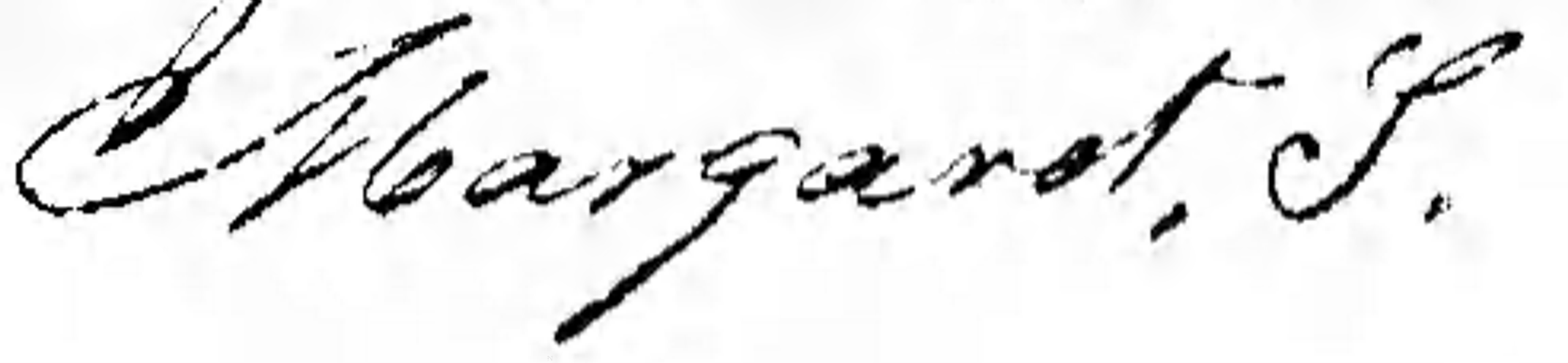

Margaret Grey Eyes Solomon (November 1816 – August 18, 1890), better known as Mother Solomon, was a Wyandot nanny and cultural activist. Solomon was born along Owl Creek in Marion County, Ohio, to a Wyandot chief father. In 1822, her family moved to the Big Spring Reservation in Wyandot County, where elders relayed oral tradition to her. She learned housekeeping and English at a mission school and began attending the Wyandot Mission Church. Solomon married David Young, a Wyandot man, in 1833 and had several children with him, some of whom died before 1843. That year, the Indian Removal Act forced the Wyandots to move to Kansas. Illness and poor living conditions were initially widespread in the new community. Solomon had more children in Kansas, though by 1860, her husband and remaining children had died.

Solomon became homesick after marrying the Wyandot sheriff John Solomon in 1860. Alongside her nephew, the Solomons relocated to around Upper Sandusky, Ohio, in 1865. When John died in 1876, she began babysitting children, and her village nicknamed her "Mother Solomon". Solomon promoted Wyandot culture and advocated for the restoration of the run-down mission church. During its rededication in 1889, she sang a Wyandot translation of the hymn "Come Thou Fount of Every Blessing" and impressed many attendees with her stage presence. Solomon died in 1890. She was a popular local figure, and her death was widely reported in newspapers. The Wyandot County Museum has since displayed her belongings.

== Early life and education ==
Margaret Grey Eyes Solomon was born in November 1816 along Owl Creek in Marion County, Ohio. (Note: Variations on her surname include "Greyeyes" and "Grey-Eyes", sometimes with the spelling "Gray". The Marion Star, The Cincinnati Enquirer, and Ronald I. Marvin Jr. cite November 26, 27 and 29, respectively, as her birthdate. The Cincinnati Enquirer cites Wayne County as her birthplace.) She was the eldest of four full siblings and two half-siblings. Her father was the Wyandot chief John "Squire" Grey Eyes, (Note: Kathryn Magee Labelle cites "Lewis" as his given name.) and her mother was a Wyandot woman named Eliza. Solomon's given name was of Christian origin.

Squire sought to teach Indigenous knowledge to Solomon, and he encouraged family visits to culturally significant sites. For example, when Solomon was four, Squire brought her to the Olentangy Indian Caverns. She learned that generations of Wyandots held meetings or hid from enemies in the caves, and understood the importance of visiting the site. Solomon and her family worked as hunters and traders along village footpaths. In 1822, they moved into a small cabin on the Big Spring Reservation, located north of Carey in Wyandot County. Solomon recited traditional Wyandot language teachings to her dolls at home, and Wyandot elders relayed oral tradition to her. For example, her uncle, Chief Warpole, taught her the origin of their family name: her part-British paternal grandfather was adopted into the Wyandots and was named "Grey Eyes Man". Another time, Solomon gathered with other children to hear Warpole describe the origins of the Wyandots in Canada and their relocations to Michilimackinac, Detroit, and Upper Sandusky. He emphasized to his audience the importance of maintaining Wyandot culture.

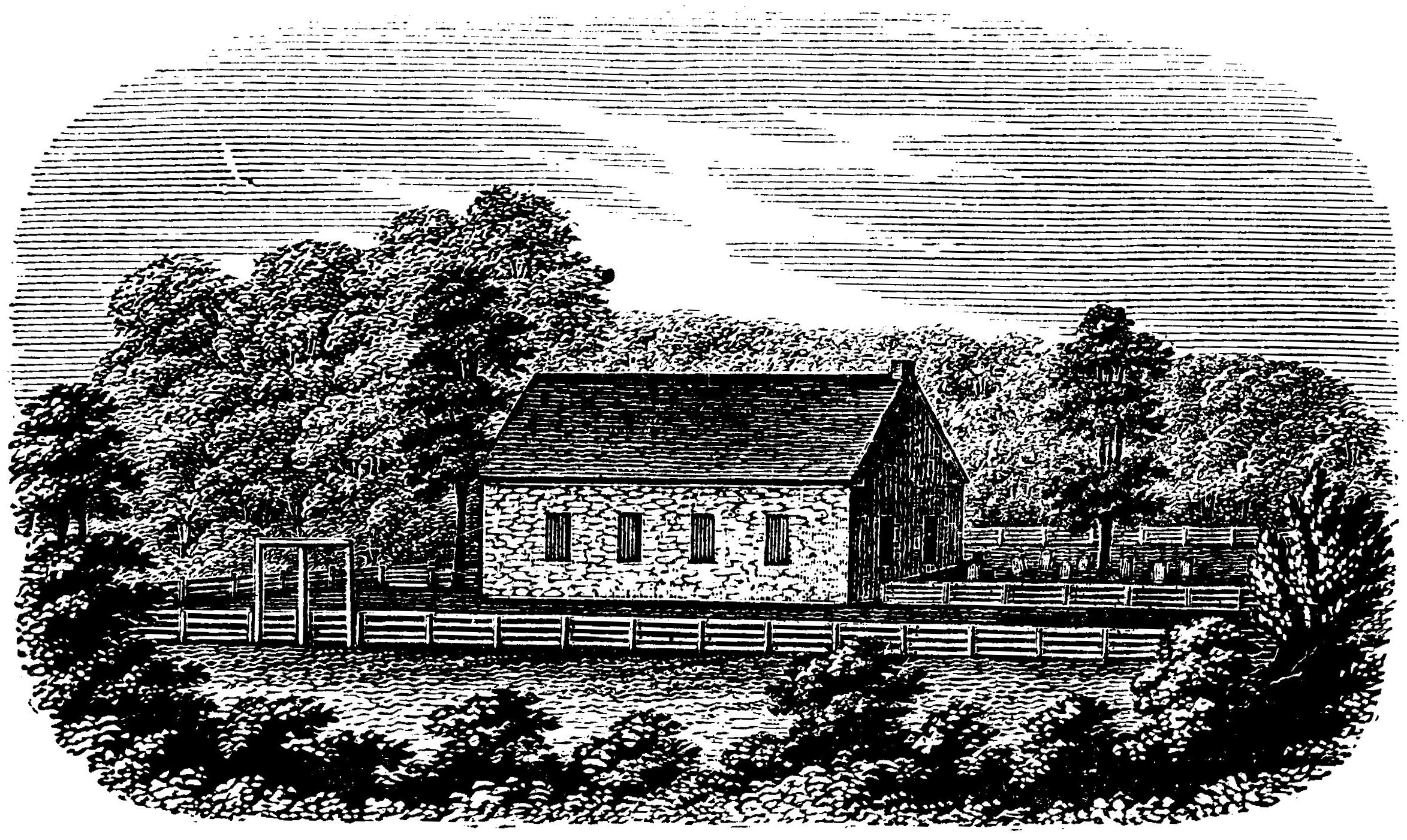
The Wyandot Mission Church illustrated in 1846

Methodist missionaries were prominent in the reserve and converted many Wyandots; Squire was among a group of chiefs that requested the Methodist Episcopal Church to build a mission school in Upper Sandusky. Upon its opening in 1821, Solomon was one of the first students to be enrolled. Students boarded at the school, and her siblings later attended with her. She and the other schoolgirls were taught to weave, sew, knit, cook, and housekeep. The missionary Harriet Stubbs taught Solomon hymns, and at age 13, she was improving her English spelling and reading. As a child, Solomon also attended the nearby Wyandot Mission Church.

Two of Solomon's siblings married Wyandots from the Detroit River area, and her family kept close relationships with the community there. Solomon married David Young, a Wyandot man who had adopted a Christian name after becoming a Methodist preacher. Their wedding occurred in the mission church on February 4, 1833. Solomon and Young had at least three children in Ohio.

== Wyandot removal to Kansas ==
President Andrew Jackson's Indian Removal Act, a major law in his project of Indian removal, was passed in 1830 and required Indigenous communities to move west of the Mississippi River. Commissioners sent by the federal government to negotiate treaties began pressuring the Wyandots to leave, and many nearby Lenapes and Shawnees moved west. However, Wyandot scouting parties out west in 1831 and 1834 rejected the land tracts proposed by the government. Squire was against removing and only conceded when a Wyandot council voted two-thirds in favor. The Wyandots secured 25,000 acres (10,000 ha) within Kansas City, Kansas, then reluctantly signed a removal treaty in March 1842.

On July 12, 1843, Solomon gathered alongside hundreds at the Wyandot Mission Church. They grieved, spread flowers across the adjacent cemetery, and heard Squire give a farewell speech. Mrs. Parker, a white friend, cried and hugged Solomon before she left. At least one daughter travelled with Solomon and Young, though at least two of their children had died and were buried in the mission church cemetery. Solomon felt distraught leaving them behind.

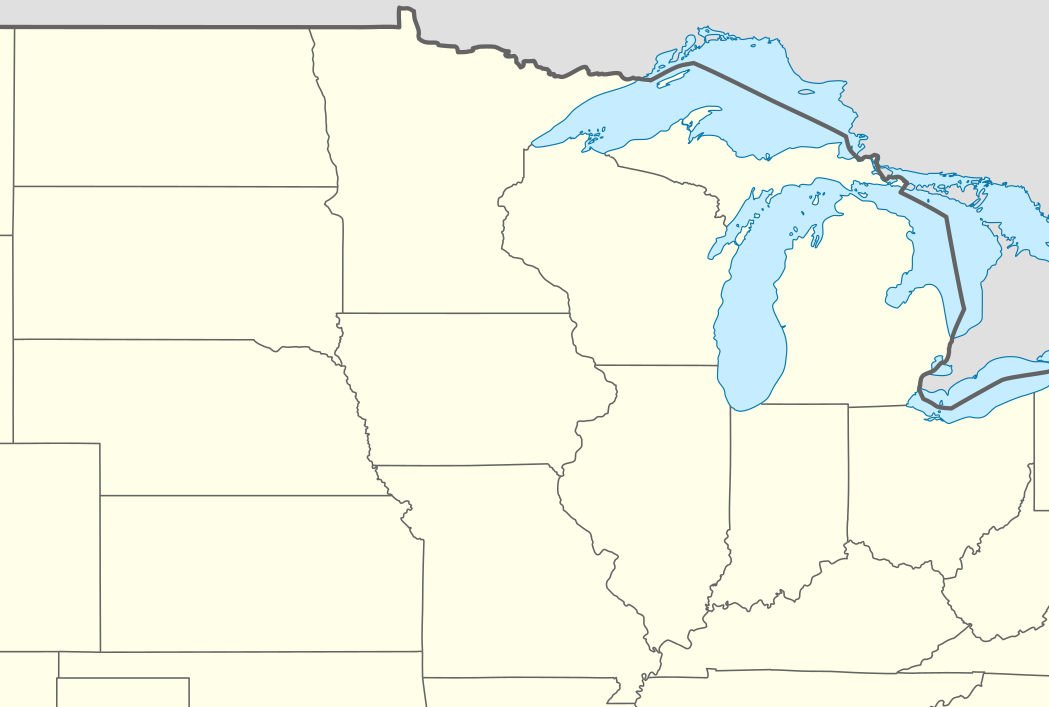
The movement of the Wyandots during their removal

Around 664 Wyandots arrived in Cincinnati, Ohio, after a week of travel by wagon, horse, and foot. Whiskey traders gathered and threatened them before they boarded two steamships to St. Louis, Missouri. They boarded two more steamships to Kansas City, but upon arrival, the federal government failed to provide the land described in the treaty. The Wyandots were forced to camp in flooded lowlands along the Kansas River, where eye inflammation, measles, and severe diarrhea were widespread and 100 of them died. In December, the Wyandots secured 25,000 acres of land from neighbouring Lenapes.

In Kansas, Young began work as a ferryman while Solomon recuperated from the removal with her family. The two settled in a small house built around December 1843, then ordered saplings and seeds from a nursery in Ohio. They began an apple tree orchard and a garden of corn, beans, and potatoes. Although the soil had not been plowed and the first summer was extremely hot, they continued to cultivate the garden.

Solomon had more children in Kansas. She is known to have had three boys and five girls throughout her life, though all of them died young. Her two-year-old son died in 1848, and another son died of remittent fever a year later. She only had three living children by 1851. That year, Young died of tuberculosis, and in 1852, a daughter died of cholera. By the end of the decade, Solomon had buried her entire family in the Huron Indian Cemetery, which had replaced the mission school and church as a Wyandot fixture.

A gray horse, bay horse, and brown mare, worth $195 combined, (Note: Equivalent to $4,800 in 2024) were stolen from Solomon in September 1848, which she attributed to emigrants traveling the Oregon Trail. That fall, further thefts occurred involving 30 of her pigs, worth $90 in total. (Note: Equivalent to $2,200 in 2024) Possessions totaling $580, (Note: Equivalent to $14,000 in 2024) including oxen and horses, were stolen from her between 1855 and 1859. In one case, a housekeeper named James Cook reportedly fled after stealing $225 worth of gold coins from a trunk owned by her brother. (Note: Equivalent to $5,600 in 2024) Solomon submitted an affidavit about the thefts to an Indian agent in 1861 in order to be compensated. Her friend Catherine Johnson corroborated each theft and stated that all were committed by white men. Federal commissioners approved some of her claims, worth $295, (Note: Equivalent to $7,300 in 2024) for compensation.

== Return to Ohio ==
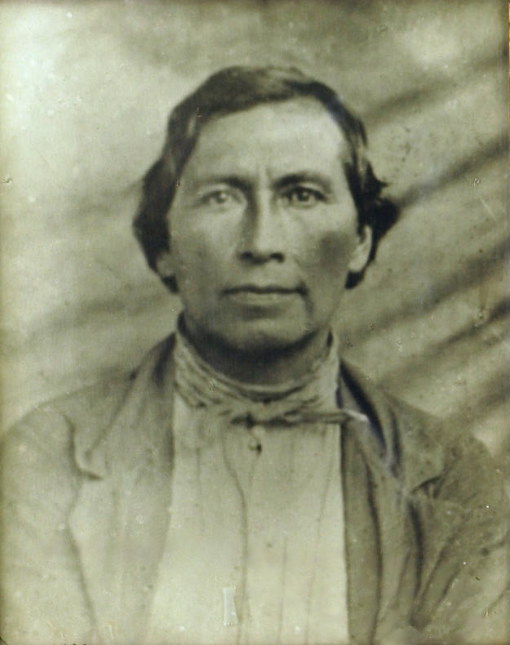
John Solomon c. 1870

Margaret married the Wyandot sheriff John Solomon in 1860, (Note: The Cincinnati Enquirer and Ronald I. Marvin Jr. cite 1858 as the year of marriage.) and afterwards, was struck by homesickness. She convinced John and her nephew, Jimmy Guyami, to return to Ohio with her. The two-acre (0.8 ha) land tract she owned with John was put up for auction in October 1862. The three returned to Ohio in 1865 and settled in a small cabin she had previously lived in, located north of Upper Sandusky along the Sandusky River. According to the historian Kathryn Magee Labelle, "there was little left of the old reservation." The community council house had burned down in 1851, and the roof and walls of the mission church had begun to collapse, although several grave sites and houses remained.

John worked as a tailor until his death on December 14, 1876. Now 60 and widowed a second time, Solomon began babysitting children in her settler village, and she often helped struggling families. She worked tirelessly every day in her childcare, and the village nicknamed her "Mother Solomon" out of respect. Solomon promoted Wyandot culture throughout the village and demonstrated the Wyandot language in community gatherings and public presentations. She taught the nonindigenous children about the relationships between their ancestors and Wyandots by repeating stories her elders had told. The Hocking Sentinel, a local newspaper in Logan, Ohio, described her storytelling as "full of interest and romance". A writer for the newspaper stated that they visited Solomon often and that she spoke for hours about early Wyandot history and her childhood. In 1881, Solomon briefly visited her relatives in Kansas, who had sent many invitations. She gave away paintings of the Wyandot chiefs Mononcue and Between-the-Logs in 1883 and allowed them to be reproduced.

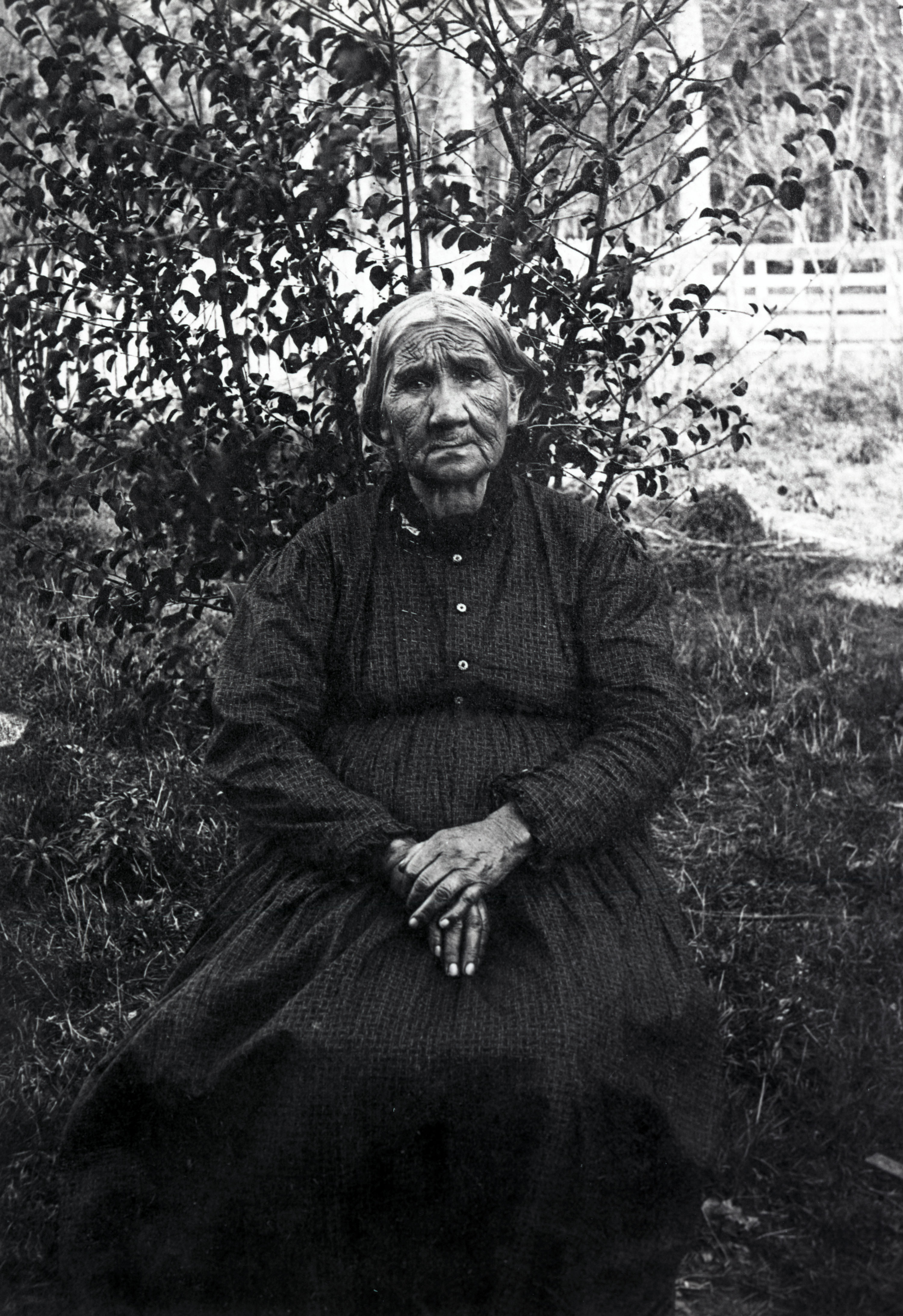
Solomon in 1887

Solomon advocated for the village to restore the run-down mission church as a means to preserve Wyandot presence in Ohio. In 1888, with a $2,000 budget, (Note: Equivalent to $70,000 in 2024) the General Conference of the Methodist Episcopal Church began repairs. On September 21, 1889, the Central Ohio Conference held a rededication ceremony attended by an estimated 3,000 people. General William H. Gibson was among the ministers who gave speeches, and Elnathan C. Gavitt, the only former missionary in attendance, spoke fondly about his time there.

Solomon, now 72, was the only Wyandot removed in 1843 to attend. She sang a Wyandot translation of "Come Thou Fount of Every Blessing", a hymn she had learned at the church. The Urbana Daily Citizen's J. W. Henley called her an "object of great interest". The Western Christian Advocate agreed and described her as "strong and well preserved". Many attendees found beauty in her native language, and The Bryan-College Station Eagle thought she sang in a "sweet, clear voice". After her song, participants in the service passed hats around and raised $25 for her to buy winter clothes. (Note: Equivalent to $1,000 in 2024) As the participants circulated and shook hands, the Western Christian Advocate concluded: "Mother Solomon, and many others, became very happy, and rejoiced, and shouted the praises of God."

== Death and legacy ==
After becoming weaker, Solomon agreed to move into the home of the local millowners Mr. and Mrs. Jacob Hayman in July 1890. That year, she signed a document objecting to the removal of remains in the Huron Indian Cemetery. She died on August 18, 1890, and her funeral was held at the Wyandot Mission Church two days later. Despite a downpour that morning, a large crowd gathered with people from across Wyandot County. Solomon's death was widely reported in local newspapers, which emphasized her father's role as chief, her removal to Kansas and return to Ohio, and her work as a nanny. Labelle refers to the coverage as a "momentary acknowledgement of [Wyandot] resilience in Ohio", but also notes that many stories falsely called Solomon "the last of the Wyandots", which reflected the misconception and romanticization of Native Americans as a vanishing people.

Solomon was a popular local figure. According to the archivist Thelma R. Marsh, she was "almost a legend" when she died. Many adults attested to being raised by Solomon, and some deemed it an honor. Labelle believes that her attainment of the honorific "Mother", rather than the lesser "Sister" or "Auntie", indicates success in her work. She describes Solomon as part of a 19th-century wave of Midwestern mothers who helped reconcile settler and Indigenous cultures through community service and caregiving.

Studies about Solomon are limited, though an exception is Marsh's 1984 children's book Daughter of Grey Eyes: The Story of Mother Solomon. It spans 60 pages and draws from archival material, journal articles, and family interviews. On the morning of August 12, 1990, Marsh led a service at the mission church commemorating the centennial of Solomon's funeral. In October 2016, the church held an event celebrating the bicentennial of missionaries in Ohio, and Solomon's life was recounted during a tour of the cemetery attended by 192 people.

In February 1931, the Wyandot County Museum displayed a century-old chair built by Solomon that featured a woven shagbark hickory seat and no nails. They dedicated a glass case to her in May 1971 with her glasses, smoking pipe, beaded purse, candle molds, woven basket, and portrait. In addition, the McCutchen Overland Inn Museum displayed her saddle in the Anderson General Store in May 2021.
