= Wyandot Mission Church =

Historic church in Ohio, United States

- U.S. National Register of Historic Places
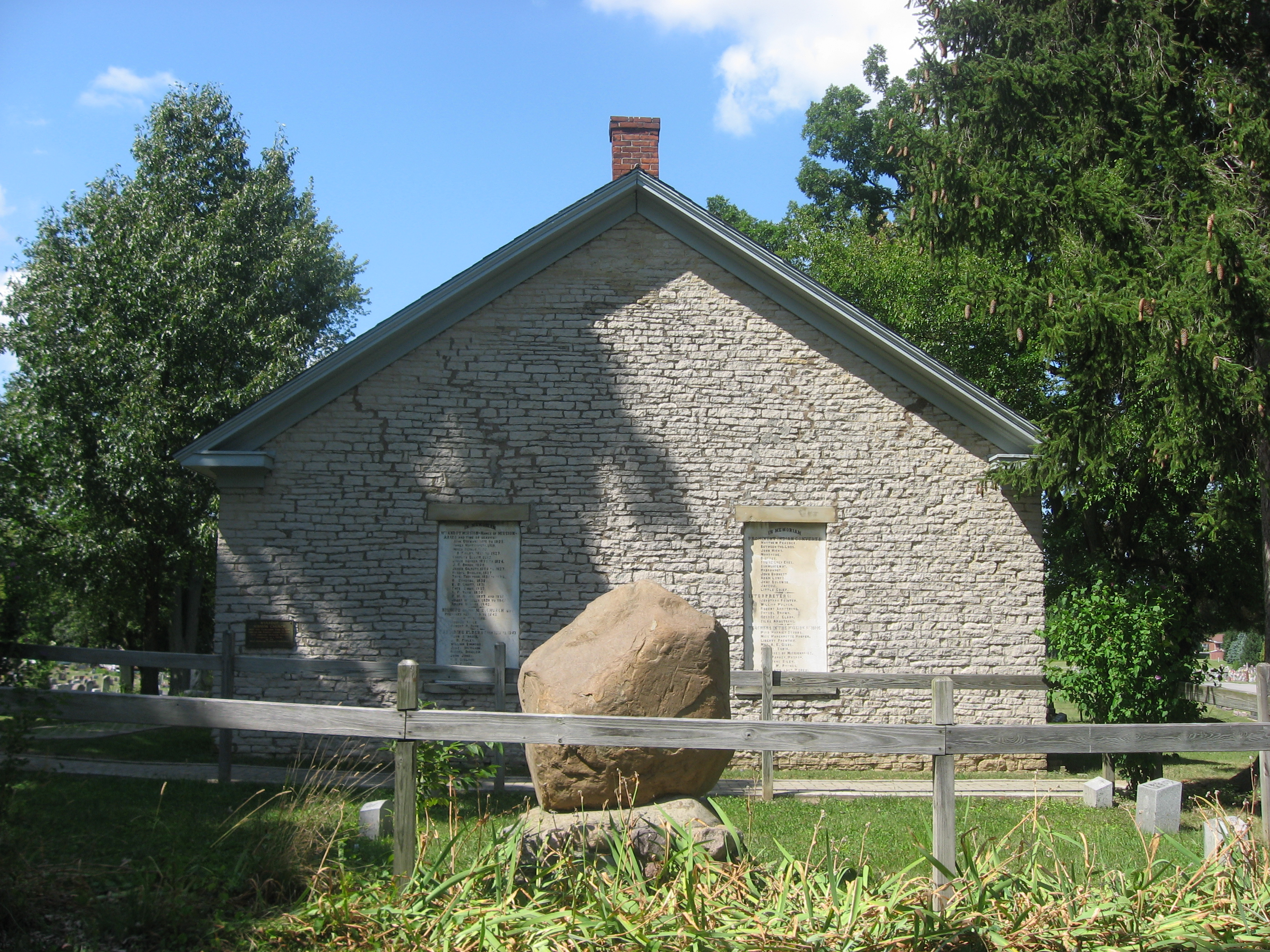

- Location within Ohio Location within the United States
- Location: East Church Street (Upper Sandusky, Ohio, U.S.)
- Coordinates: 40°50′10″N 83°16′43″W
- Area: 3 acres (1.2 ha)
- Built: 1824
- NRHP reference No.: 76001552
- Added to NRHP: January 20, 1976

The Wyandot Mission Church is an early 19th century Methodist church in Upper Sandusky, Ohio. The church's interior contains hand-hewn benches, dark pews, and portraits of the missionary John Stewart and his Wyandot converts. The church is surrounded by trees and a cemetery and is often described as peaceful.

Reverend James B. Finley joined Stewart among the Wyandots before directing construction of the church in 1824. He built it of blue limestone. The Wyandots used the church until their removal to Kansas in 1843. That year, they met there and deeded its land to the Methodist Episcopal Church. The site was abandoned within multiple years and was only restored by Methodists in 1888. Ongoing summer services began in 1970, and the church was added to the National Register of Historic Places in 1976.

== Description ==
The Wyandot Mission Church is located on East Church Street in the northern outskirts of Upper Sandusky, Ohio, on the site of the former Upper Sandusky Reservation. The church is surrounded by a cemetery and comprises one room. The interior is decorated with portraits of the missionary John Stewart and his Wyandot converts, as well as paintings of the church's services during the 19th century. At the front is a raised platform and pulpit. David Yonke wrote in 2009 that Christian and American flags stood on the platform alongside a Wyandot flag depicting a turtle, whose back Wyandots believe the world was created upon. On both sides of the platform are gray wooden doors with white crosses. The church contains hand-hewn log benches, pews of a dark walnut color, and a potbelly stove.

Henry Howe reported in 1847 that the Wyandot Mission Church was encircled by forest and stood in a small enclosure, and Ron Simon of News-Journal wrote in 1973 that it was sheltered by "old and graceful" trees. He thought the church "enjoy[ed] a quiet, almost melancholy setting". The Marion Star's Lucy Wood thought this atmosphere enticed meditation, as well as "simple and sincere" ways of worship.

== History ==
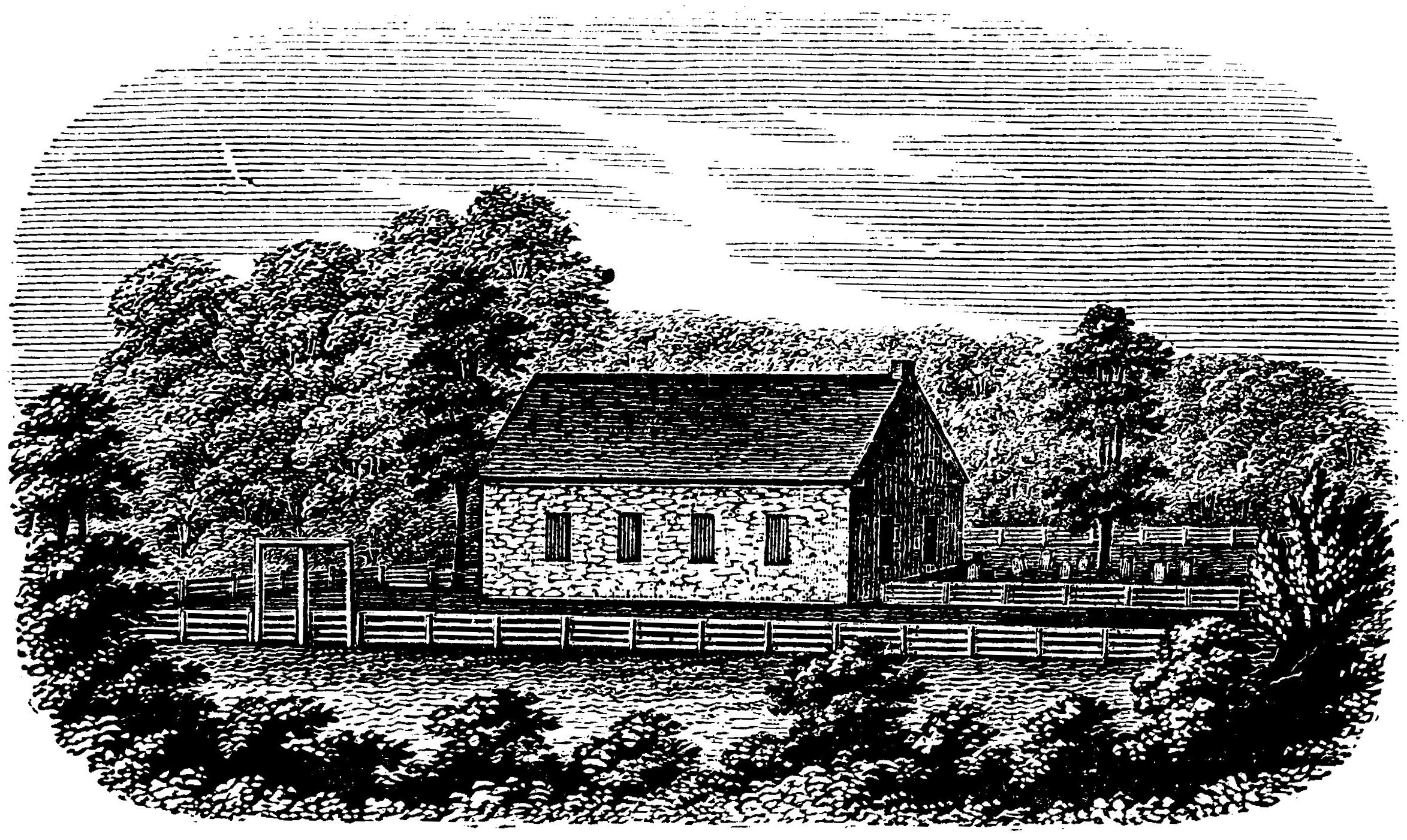
The church illustrated in 1846

In 1816, John Stewart, a Methodist son of slaves, traveled north of his home in Marietta, Ohio, after purportedly hearing a commandment from God. He met the Wyandots of Upper Sandusky, whom he began preaching and singing to in 1819. Many Wyandots respected him and converted to Methodism, including some influential chiefs. The Reverend James B. Finley joined Stewart soon after, and Reverend Charles Elliott arrived in 1822. Stewart died the following year, in 1823.

The Wyandot Mission Church was built in 1824 under Finley's direction. It was the first U.S. mission of the Methodist Episcopal Church (MEC). Finley had traveled to Washington, D.C., with two chiefs to obtain its funds from the federal government. John C. Calhoun, a secretary of war, gave him permission, and the government granted him $1,333. President James Monroe suggested he use materials of such strength that the church would stand long after their deaths. The Wyandot Mission Church was built of blue limestone quarried from the Sandusky River and hauled by carts and oxen. The wood of its interior was cut from the Indian Mill a few miles away. For two decades, many Wyandots worshipped and learned at the church.

In 1843, as a result of the Indian Removal Act, the Wyandots were forced west into Kansas City, Kansas. That July, hundreds met at the church to weep, place flowers across the cemetery, and hear the chief Squire Grey Eyes give a farewell speech. Wyandots sold 109,000 acres of Ohioan land. They deeded the church's three acres to the MEC and requested they protect it from desecration. Methodists used the church and tended to its graves until 1847, but it was then abandoned, and eventually, its roof fell in and its walls crumbled.

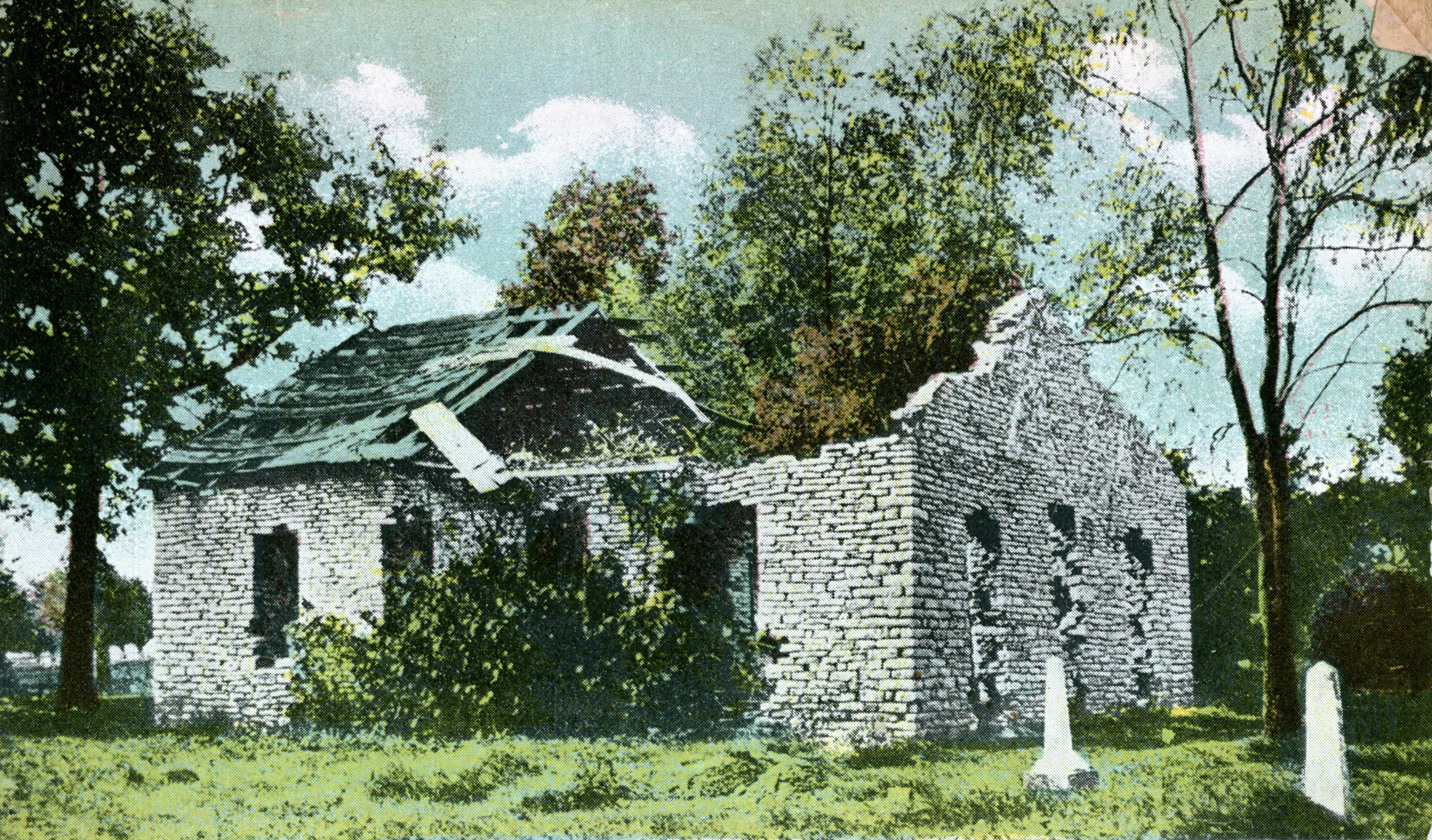
The church in decay, 1910.

In the 1870s, Reverend Nathanial N. B. C. Love became enamored with the Wyandot Mission Church. In 1888, the General Conference of the MEC allotted $2,000 to its restoration. Construction began the following year, to which he took part. The church was rededicated in September 1889. Elnathan C. Gavitt, who worked for the church in the early 1830s, and General William H. Gibson were among the ministers who gave speeches, and N. B. C. Love displayed a historical sketch. Margaret Grey Eyes Solomon was the only removed Wyandot to attend; she had returned to Ohio in 1865. Solomon sang a Wyandot translation of the hymn "Come Thou Fount of Every Blessing".

The General Conference of the United Methodist Church (UMC) designated the Wyandot Mission Church a historical shrine in 1960. That decade, the local historian Thelma Marsh initiated tours of the church. It was added to the National Register of Historic Places in 1976 and is now maintained by the John Stewart United Methodist Church. Services have been held at the Wyandot Mission Church each summer since 1970. Until the 1973 season, attendance never fell below 50, and once reached 135. Tourists visited the church daily and often after services; the 1972 season recorded 5,000 in total. Services in 2009 drew between 30 and 96 people. The Wyandot Mission Church received a few hundred dollars annually from the West Ohio Conference of the UMC, though most maintenance funds came from donations during summer services. In 2019, the church's three acres of land were formally deeded back to the Wyandotte Nation.
