= Lyda Conley =

American lawyer (c.1869–1946)

Eliza Burton Conley
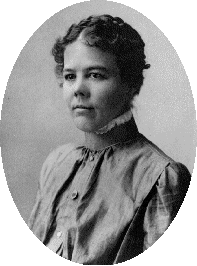
- Born: Eliza Burton Conley c. 1869
- Died: May 28, 1946 (aged 76–77); Kansas City, Kansas, US
- Resting place: Huron Cemetery, Kansas City, Kansas, US
- Education: Kansas City School of Law
- Occupation: Lawyer
- Known for: Protecting the sale of Huron Cemetery
- Relatives: Helena Conley (sister); Tarhe (great-great-grandfather)
- Family: Zane family

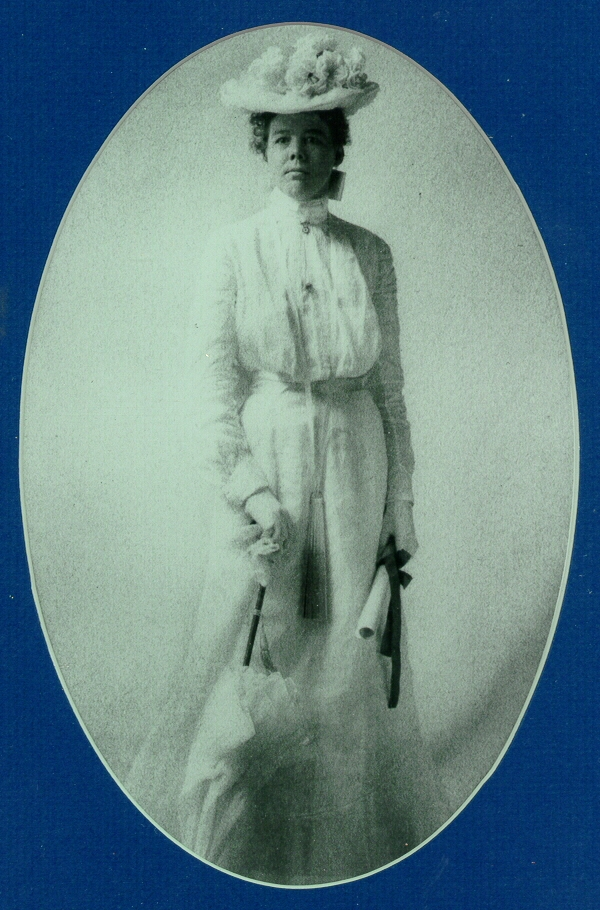
Conley pictured on the day of her law school graduation, diploma in hand (1902)

Eliza Burton "Lyda" Conley (c. 1869 – May 28, 1946) was a Wyandot Native American and an American lawyer. She was the first woman admitted to the Kansas Bar Association. She was notable for her campaign to prevent the sale and development of the Huron Cemetery in Kansas City, now known as the Wyandot National Burying Ground. She challenged the government in court, and in 1909 she was the first Native American woman admitted to argue a case before the Supreme Court of the United States.

Her case appears to be the first in which "a plaintiff argued that the burying grounds of Native Americans were entitled to federal protection." Conley gained the support of Kansas Senator Charles Curtis, who proposed and led the passage of legislation in 1916 to prevent the sale of the Huron Cemetery and establish the land as a federal park. In 1971, the Huron Cemetery was listed on the National Register of Historic Places, and in 2016 it was designated a National Historic Landmark.

From the late 19th century, the cemetery was at the heart of a struggle between the unrecognized Wyandot Nation of Kansas and the federally recognized Wyandotte Nation, headquartered in Oklahoma. In 1998, the two groups finally agreed to preserve the Wyandot National Burying Ground only for religious, cultural, and related purposes in keeping with its sacred history.

== Early life ==
Lyda Conley was the youngest of four daughters born to Elizabeth Burton Zane (1838–1879), a multiracial Wyandot person, and Andrew Syrenus Conley (c. 1830–1885), a Yankee of Scots-Irish and English descent who had migrated from New Canaan, Connecticut, to Ohio and Kansas. Her family history was fairly common within the Wyandot Nation at the time, as increasing numbers of Wyandot married and had children with European Americans, resulting in increasing numbers of multiracial tribal members. The Conley family's move West was also part of a larger Wyandot migration as white encroachment of their ancestral land increased.

Elizabeth Zane was the granddaughter of Isaac Zane, who had been captured as a child in Virginia by the Wyandots and adopted into the tribe. Isaac Zane lived with the Wyandot nation for 17 years and married White Crane, daughter of Chief Tarhe. They moved with the tribe to Ohio and founded the town of Zanesfield. Some of their children were born there, including Elizabeth's mother Hannah, as well as grandchildren. In 1843, under United States government pressure, the Wyandot were forced to leave Ohio and move further west to Kansas as part of an Indian removal.

Elizabeth Zane and Andrew Conley married in 1860 in Logan County, Ohio. They raised their daughters on a 64 acres (0.26 km^{2}) farm in present-day Wyandotte County. In 1855, Elizabeth had received the land at the age of 17 when Wyandot tribal land was allocated in severalty. In later years, the property collapsed into the Missouri River, forcing the grown Conley daughters to move into Kansas City.

The daughters were encouraged to seek education. Helena "Lena" Conley (1867–1958) graduated from Park College in Missouri. Lyda Conley graduated from Kansas City School of Law in 1902 and was the first woman admitted to the Kansas bar. Sarah "Sallie" Conley (1863-1880) died at a relatively young age. Ida Conley (1865–1948) was also active in civic and public life. The sisters shared a house in Kansas City, where they lived together all their lives. None married.

== Career and public life ==
=== Background ===
In 1855, some of the Wyandots accepted the government's offer of United States citizenship, as they were judged ready to join the majority society. Their land in Kansas was divided among the individuals. Members who were not ready to give up their tribal institutions migrated from Kansas in 1867 and went to Oklahoma as part of the 19th-century removals. There they kept some tribal structure and retained legal authority over the tribal communal burying ground, at the Huron Cemetery in Kansas.

In 1906, the Wyandotte Nation, based in Indian Territory, later Oklahoma, approved the sale of the cemetery for development and had Congress authorize the United States Secretary of Interior to convey it for sale, with proceeds to go to the nation in Oklahoma. Kansas City had grown around it and developers wanted to expand on the prime property. At one corner was a Carnegie Library and the Brund Hotel was on another corner. The Scottish Rite Masonic Temple was under reconstruction following a fire.

== Conley's cause ==
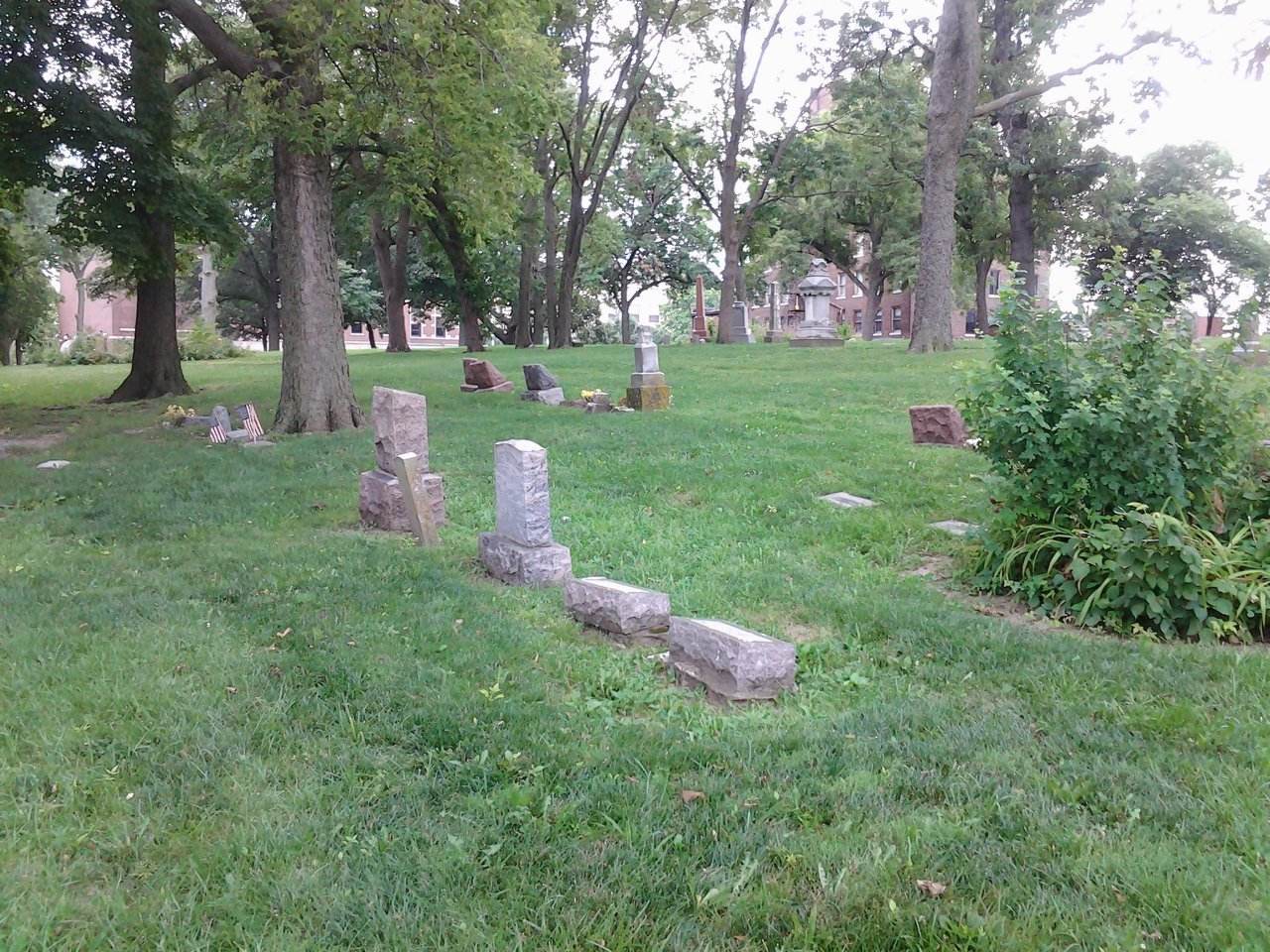
The Huron Indian Cemetery, officially the Wyandotte National Burial Ground, in 2015.

When this controversy arose, the Wyandot descendants in Kansas City were considered an "absentee" or "citizen class" of the Wyandotte Nation and did not have legal control of the burial ground. In 1855 they had accepted the United States citizenship and land allotments in Kansas. The burial ground had been excluded from the allotments, and as American Indian land, it was considered to be controlled by the Wyandotte Nation, which has a tribal government based in Oklahoma. The historic burying ground held Conley's maternal ancestors and others of both the present-day Wyandotte Nation of Kansas and the Wyandotte Nation of Oklahoma. The earliest burials dated to 1843, when the tribe had first come to Kansas.

Conley and her sisters strongly disagreed with the proposed sale. They erected a structure at the cemetery so they could live there around the clock and protect the burial ground. They took turns standing guard with muskets and put up "No trespassing" signs around it.

Kansas City newspapers covered the controversy. Kansas City Times (October 25, 1906):

In this cemetery are buried one-hundred of our ancestors ... Why should we not be proud of our ancestors and protect their graves? We shall do it, and woe be to the man that first attempts to steal a body. We are part owners of the ground and have the right under the law to keep off trespassers, the right a man has to shoot a burglar who enters his home.

— Miss Lyda Conley

We shall keep right on asking bids for the property.

— J.B. Durant, Chairman of the Government commission that is trying to sell the cemetery

In 1907, Conley filed a petition in the U.S. Circuit Court for the District of Kansas for injunction against the government's authorization of sale. The court ruled against the Conleys, so she appealed. The case went to the Supreme Court of the United States, where Conley was allowed to argue the case directly before the court. Because she had not been admitted to the Supreme Court bar, she appeared in court acting in propria persona (in her own person). She was the first female Native American lawyer admitted before the U.S. Supreme Court. Justice Oliver Wendell Holmes ruled in favor of the lower courts, which had determined the government's proposed action was legal.

As the case gained national attention, the Conley sisters worked to build other kinds of support. Women's clubs in Kansas City and similar associations strongly opposed development of the cemetery. US Senator Charles Curtis of Kansas, also of mixed Native American ancestry, introduced a bill in Congress that precluded the sale of the cemetery and made the land a national park. This was passed in 1916 and the cemetery was protected.

== Protecting the cemetery ==
The Conley sisters believed that it was wrong to sell and dismantle the cemetery. Their grandmother Hannah Zane, mother Elizabeth and sister Sarah were buried there, as well as numerous cousins, uncles, and aunts. The revolt of the three sisters got underway in 1907, after plans broached the previous year for the city's purchase of the Huron cemetery for private redevelopment as retail property. The Congress had authorized its sale by the Secretary of the Interior in 1905 (1906).

The Conley sisters announced that they would protect the graves of their ancestors with shotguns if necessary. They marched to the cemetery and threw up a 6-by-8-foot (1.8 by 2.4 m), one-room frame shack and moved in. H.B. Durante, Indian Commissioner, commented that it was a unique situation because of the conflict between two groups of Wyandot over the land. Only one had federal recognition for legal responsibility. He suggested it was up to the Department of Justice and federal troops to solve it.

== Congress' decision ==
In 1913, Congress repealed the bill authorizing the sale of the cemetery. The dispute between those wanting to preserve the cemetery, and those wanting to develop the land continued. One year Lyda Conley was arrested for shooting a policeman in the Huron Indian Cemetery.

Although she lost in the Supreme Court, Conley persevered in her fight, gaining support for preservation from women's clubs and civic associations in Kansas City. In 1916, Kansas Senator Charles Curtis (Kaw/Osage/Prairie Potawatomi) introduced a bill in Congress (and secured its passage) that precluded sale of the cemetery and designated it a federal park.

== Later life ==
With the land protected, Conley acted as a guardian over the property, extending her care to its birds and squirrels. She often walked from her home at 1816 North Third Street to carry water and nuts to them. The federal government had agreed to keep the cemetery "improved" by entering into a 1918 contract with Kansas City to forever maintain, protect and provide lighting and police protection to the cemetery. In February 1916 she was reported to be handling an appeal of a Bannock Indian named Luther Bearskin who was serving a sentence for being involved in the shooting of a man and woman eight years before.

In June 1937, Conley chased some people from the cemetery. She was charged by the police with disturbance. A young judge gave her choice of a $10 (equivalent to $224 in 2025) fine for disturbing the peace or a 10-day jail sentence. Proudly, Conley served the sentence. A newspaper item of June 16, 1937, headed "Miss Lyda Conley Leaves Jail", was the last article about her until the notice of her death in 1946.

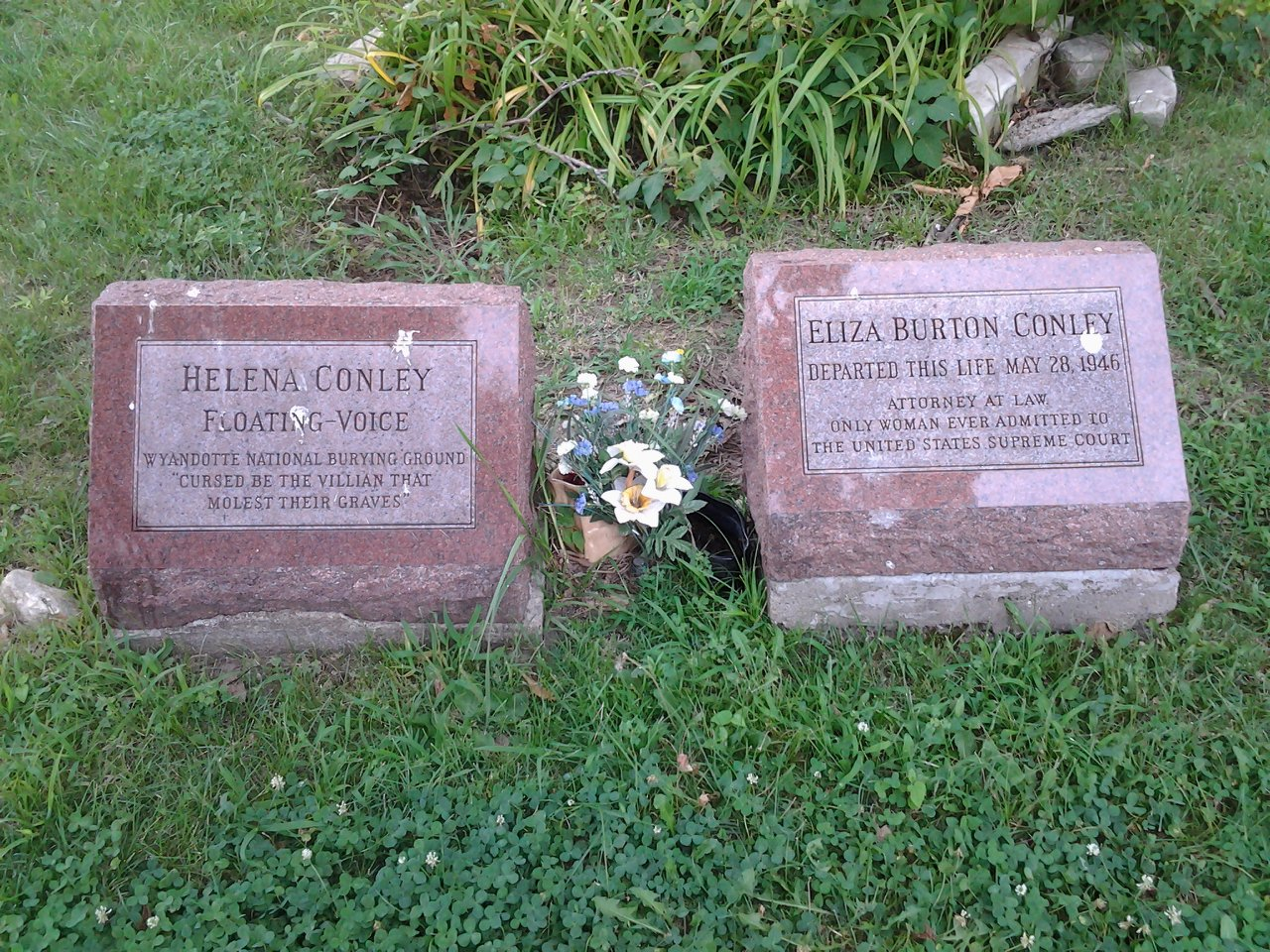
Eliza "Lyda" Conley's grave in Huron Indian Cemetery, along with that of her sister Helena "Lena" Conley.

Conley died on May 28, 1946, and was buried near other family members three days later in the cemetery she had fought so hard to protect. Lyda's good friend, Wilma Kollman, stated that the evening before she died, Lyda was coming home from the library when a man jumped from the bushes, whacked her on the head with a brick, and stole her purse, which contained only 20 cents (equivalent to $3.30 in 2025). Lyda died within 24 hours.

== Final resolution ==
Groups continued to press for development. In 1959, the Wyandot Nation of Kansas was incorporated as a nonprofit organization but still had no control over the Huron Cemetery. It has been seeking federal recognition.

Over the decades Kansas City and the Wyandotte Nation of Oklahoma floated many proposals for development of the cemetery. Preservation groups succeeded in 1971 in having the Huron Cemetery listed on the National Register of Historic Places in recognition of its significant historical and cultural value.

That only made new proposals more complicated to implement, but groups continued to put them forward. The development of gaming as revenue generators for Native Americans added new pressure. In the 1990s the Wyandotte Nation of Oklahoma evaluated the Huron Cemetery for redevelopment as a gaming casino. New protections under the 1990 Native American Graves Protection and Repatriation Act would have required agreement by lineal descendants of people interred at the cemetery. Those in Kansas City were strongly set against any development. Finally, in 1998 the Wyandot Nation of Kansas and Wyandotte Nation came to agreement to preserve the cemetery only for purposes that were religious, cultural and in keeping with its sacred use. In December 2016 the cemetery was named as a National Historic Landmark.

== See also ==
- List of first women lawyers and judges in the United States
- List of Native American politicians
- Native American women in politics
