= Helena Conley =

American Wyandot activist (1864–1958)

- Floating Voice
- Conley in 1930
- Born: September 10, 1864; Nearman, Wyandotte County, Kansas, US
- Died: September 15, 1958 (aged 94); Kansas City, Kansas, US
- Resting place: Wyandot National Burying Ground
- Education: Park College
- Occupations: Activist, herbalist
- Known for: Defense of Huron Cemetery, "The Wyandot Curse"
- Relatives: Lyda Conley (sister); Chief Tarhe (great-great-grandfather)
- Family: Zane family

Helena Gros Conley (September 10, 1864 – September 15, 1958) was a Wyandot activist and self-styled sorceress known for her fierce defense of the Huron Cemetery in Kansas City, Kansas. Along with her sisters, Lyda and Ida, she gained national attention for occupying the cemetery in a makeshift fort to prevent its sale and development by the federal government. Conley was particularly noted for her role in physically guarding the grounds, her use of curses against political opponents, and her reputation as a "force to be reckoned with."

== Early life and education ==
Helena Conley was born on September 10, 1864, on a farm near Nearman station in Wyandotte County, Kansas. She was the third of four daughters born to Andrew Serenes Conley and Eliza Burton Zane. Her father was born in New York and died in 1885, while her mother was born in Ohio and died in 1879. Through her mother, Conley was one-sixteenth Wyandot and the great-great-granddaughter of Chief Tarhe, a distinguished head of the Wyandot tribe and the Huron confederacy.

Her mother had received a 65-acre land grant at the age of 17, which became the family farm where Helena and her sisters were born. Around 1890, the sisters were forced to abandon the farm after the Missouri River eroded the land on its south bank. Following this loss, they moved to 1712 N. 3rd Street in Kansas City, Kansas, a property willed to them by their aunt, Sarah Zane.

Conley pursued higher education at Park College, rowing a boat across the Missouri River daily to attend classes. As a young woman, she was secretary of the Sunday school at Six Mile Methodist Church and later became a member of the Seventh Street Methodist Church. For a time, she also worked as an instructor and matron for girls at the Wyandot Indian reservation in Oklahoma.

== Defense of Huron Cemetery ==
Following the deaths of their parents, Helena and her sisters, Lyda and Ida, learned that the Huron Cemetery, a sacred Wyandot burial ground, was being targeted for sale and development. Contending that the ground was sacred and should not be disturbed, the sisters launched a multi-year campaign to resist the sale.

In a direct act of occupation, the sisters moved onto the cemetery grounds to protect them. On July 25, 1907, they constructed a 6-by-8-foot frame structure, which they named "Fort Conley," and surrounded it with a fence of iron spokes. For two years, they lived in the small shack. They maintained their vigil for nearly five years in total, defying United States marshals and police who attempted to interfere.

During this occupation, the sisters armed themselves with their father's musket. Although the gun was reportedly not loaded, their armed presence was a deterrent. Helena Conley was described as a "force to be reckoned with". She wore a rattlesnake necklace as a protective amulet and frequently threatened curses upon anyone who disturbed the graves. In one instance involving her own property, a neighbor alerted her that men were cutting down trees on her land. She forcefully expelled the men, returning from the altercation with blood running from her ears.

She showed compassion during the occupation. On one occasion, she caught a young boy climbing the cemetery fence and confronted him. Upon learning he was climbing in to visit his little brother's grave, she brought him into the shack to comfort and console him.

Her activism continued into the 1920s. On October 24, 1922, the body of a white man, Frank Epsy, was buried in the Huron Cemetery. Helena stood at the head of the grave, accompanied by police officers and a welfare officer. Raising her right arm, she commanded, "I forbid this burial," and delivered a curse in the Wyandot language against the dead man's soul and those responsible for the interment, using "dam" and "hell" as "trimmings" for the curse.

Weeks later, on November 8, 1922, her vigil was halted when she was arrested for disturbing the peace after wiring the cemetery gate shut. Upon her arrest, she refused to give her name or age to the police sergeant.

=== The Wyandot Curse ===
Conley cultivated a reputation as a "self-styled sorceress" and was a reputed witch and herbalist. She claimed her power to curse was transmitted to her by a tribal witch who offered her a choice between money and power. Conley chose power.

She placed curses on numerous public figures, including Presidents, members of Congress, and mayors. She attributed the death of Senator Preston B. Plumb to her curse after he introduced a resolution to sell the cemetery in 1890. Plumb died a year later. She also claimed responsibility for the political defeats of president Theodore Roosevelt, who had signed the bill authorizing the sale, and attributed the deaths of his two sons in war to her curse. In later years, she asserted that a 1951 flood in Kansas City was caused by a curse she placed on the city after her home was sold for taxes.

== Later life and death ==
In her later years, Conley lived at 1704 North Third Street in Kansas City, where she often recounted stories of her curses to visitors. She was the last survivor of her immediate family.

Conley died at her home on September 15, 1958, at the age of 94, believed to have suffered a heart attack. Funeral services were held at Gibson Chapel and officiated by reverend Judd Jones. Although she had previously expressed a wish in 1956 to have her ashes thrown into the Missouri River, she changed her mind and requested burial in a walnut casket.

She was buried in the Huron Cemetery. Her tombstone bears the Wyandot name "Floating Voice" and the inscription: "Cursed Be The Villain That Molest Their Graves". At her funeral, a friend sprinkled sweet balsam on her coffin, fulfilling a specific request Conley had made.
