= Upper Sandusky Reservation =

Coordinates: 40°52′N 83°15′W

The Upper Sandusky Reservation was home to many of the Wyandot from 1818–1842. Also called "The Grand Reserve", the twelve mile square reservation was established in the Treaty of Fort Meigs, under Wyandot Half-King Dunquat. The tribe also received a cranberry bog near Broken Sword Creek.

The reservation had over one hundred log homes, a gristmill, orchards, and a Methodist mission led by John Stewart and James Bradley Finley.

In 1841, a beloved chief, Summundewat, was murdered by whites, along with his family. Concerned for their safety, the Wyandot negotiated terms for relocation throughout 1842. They received financial compensation for 10,000 acres, funds to improve their new reservation in the West, and an annual annuity. This was the largest removal settlement for any Ohio tribe.

The Upper Sandusky Reservation was the last Native American reservation in Ohio when it was dissolved, and was also the largest Native American reservation in Ohio, although up until 1817 most of Northwest Ohio had not been ceded to the United States government.

The reservation was located at the great bend of the Sandusky River, at Upper Sandusky.

== Notable residents ==
- Tarhe (c. 1742–1818)

== Legacy ==
The Wyandot left the Upper Sandusky Reservation in July 1843, and walked 150 miles south to Cincinnati, where they boarded two steamboats which took them to Kansas City. Their descendants who remained in Kansas formed the Wyandot Nation of Kansas.

In 2019, the Wyandot Mission Church and its three acres of land were officially returned to the Wyandotte Nation by the United Methodist Church.

== See also ==
- Indian removals in Ohio
