= Matthew Mudeater =

Chief of the Wyandotte Nation (1812–1878)

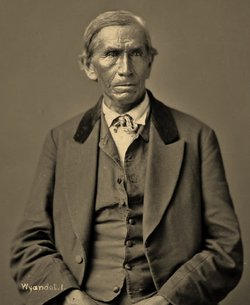
- Mudeater in 1875, in Washington, D.C.

Head Chief of Wyandotte Nation
- Preceded by: Silas Armstrong

Personal details
- Born: February 23, 1812 Upper Sandusky, Ohio, US
- Died: August 20, 1878 (aged 66)

Matthew Mudeater (February 23, 1812 — August 20, 1878) was a chief of the Wyandot people. A farmer by trade, Mudeater was a prominent member of his tribe and played a key role in gaining United States citizenship for his people. When tensions began to rise in the Wyandotte home of Kansas, he led much of his people to settle in the Indian Territory.

== Early life ==
Matthew Mudeater was born on February 23, 1812, in Upper Sandusky, Ohio, the then home of the Wyandotte Nation. He was married to Nancy Mudeater, and together they had several children. On July 9, 1843, the Wyandottes emigrated from Ohio to land in Kansas which had been purchased from the Delaware Nation. The Wyandotte emigration was a result of forceful removal, and the population traveled to Kansas on flat boats. The Wyandottes wintered on the east side of the Missouri River, and in the spring of 1844 they settled on the western side forming Wyandotte County, the modern day location of Kansas City, Kansas. Mudeater established a farm two miles west of the city of Wyandotte. Silas Armstrong, a chief of the Wolf Clan of the Lenape people, claimed Mudeater’s farm was "the best farm in the nation".

== The Wyandotte gain United States citizenship ==
On January 31, 1855, Chief Mudeater, alongside several other Wyandotte representatives who had traveled to Washington, D.C., signed the 1855 'Treaty With The Wyandot'. Under the treaty, the United States, represented by George Washington Manypenny, purchased the land which had previously been bought from the Delaware Nation and granted citizenship to the Wyandottes as well as the right to resettle.

== Relocation to Indian Territory ==
The late 1850s proved a difficult time for the Wyandotte Nation which experienced division within the tribe as white squatters incurred into the Wyandotte reserve in eastern Kansas. This period, dubbed Bleeding Kansas, also saw the steep rise of pre-civil war tensions as proslavery and abolitionist partisans fought violent campaigns of guerrilla warfare throughout the state. These troubles, alongside the difficulties of tribal members in receiving allotments and annuity funds granted them under the 1855 treaty led to a split in the nation. Contrary to the guidance of Chief Mudeater, some tribal members wished to return to their historic tribal territories in either Ohio, or the Upper Great Lakes region in Canada. Instead, Mudeater suggested relocation south to Indian Territory. Despite division within the tribe, in the summer of 1857, Mudeater led a group of roughly 200 of the nations population of 550 southward. No arrangements had been made with the Bureau of Indian Affairs prior to this migration, but upon arrival in mid-August 1857 this band was granted an invitation from the Seneca-Cayuga Nation to settle on Seneca lands. An attempt was made by Mudeater and other Wyandottes in 1859 to validate their nation’s residence in Indian Territory through a signed document with the Senecas, however ratification with the United States government was not attained; an 1867 treaty between several tribes—including the Seneca and the Wyandottes—and the United states ratified these changes.
