= Silas Armstrong =

American Wyandot merchant (1810–1865)

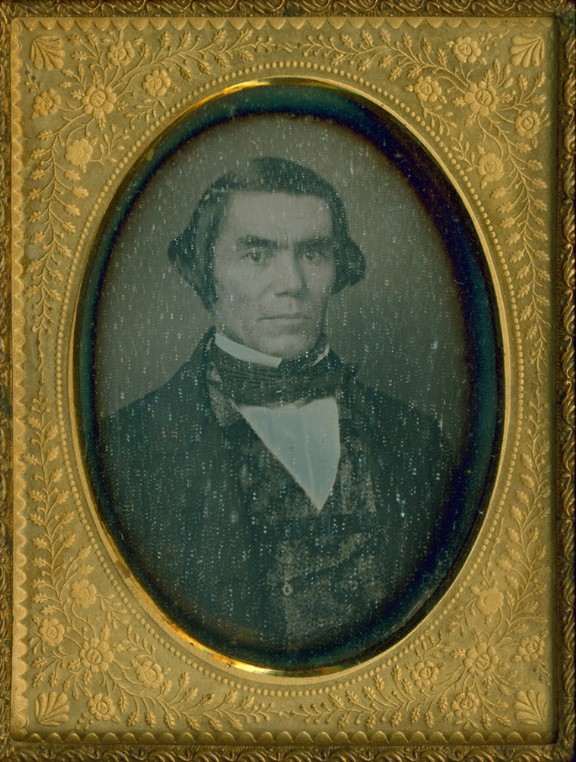
- Daguerreotype of Armstrong, c. 1850

Head Chief of Wyandotte Nation
- In office 1858 – December 14, 1865
- Preceded by: Matthew Mudeater

Personal details
- Born: January 3, 1810 Near Upper Sandusky, Ohio, US
- Died: December 14, 1865 (aged 55)
- Resting place: Huron Cemetery, Kansas City, Kansas, US
- Children: 13

Silas Armstrong (January 3, 1810 — December 14, 1865) was an American Wyandot merchant and politician. As a leader of the Wyandots, he had a major role in founding part of Kansas City, Kansas after the Wyandot were removed to Kansas from Ohio.

== Biography ==
Armstrong was born on January 3, 1810, near Upper Sandusky, Ohio, and was raised in a Bear Clan community. In 1832, he married Sarah Preston. His family's farm, known as the "Armstrong Bottom", was run by Armstrong.

In 1843, Armstrong and his family moved to the Town of Kansas. There, Armstrong began trading in a rented building in modern-day Westport. He worked as a merchant, sawmill operator, land speculator, and farmer, later forming a partnership with Hiram Northup. He also worked as an interpreter for Nathan Scarritt. He was president of the Wyandott Town Company. The town of Armstrong, Kansas was named after him; it later merged with Kansas City, Kansas.

Armstrong served as Head Chief of the Wyandotte Nation from 1858, until he fell ill and died in office on December 14, 1865. Over 1000 people attended his funeral at Huron Cemetery.
