= Upper Sandusky High School =

Location
- 800 North Sandusky Avenue; Upper Sandusky, Ohio 43351; United States; 40°50′28″N 83°16′57″W

Information
- Type: Public
- School district: Upper Sandusky Exempted Village School District
- Staff: 29.78 (FTE)
- Grades: 9–12
- Student to teacher ratio: 19.38
- Colors: Black and Orange
- Athletics conference: Northern 10 Athletic Conference
- Nickname: Rams

Upper Sandusky High School is a public high school in Upper Sandusky, Ohio. It is the only high school in the Upper Sandusky Exempted Village School District. Their nickname is the Rams. The school covers approximately 98,000 square feet (9,100 m^{2}).

== Team State champions ==
- Boys basketball – 2005 (Division II)
- Girls track and field – 2000, 2001 (Division II)

=== Athletic league affiliations ===
- Northern Ohio League: 1944–2011
- North Central Conference: 2011–2014
- Mid-Ohio Athletic Conference: Football-only, fall 2014
- Northern 10 Athletic Conference: 2014–present (football joined in 2015)

== Notable alumni ==
- Jon Diebler (born 1988), basketball player in the Israel Basketball Premier League, college basketball coach
- Jake Diebler (born 1986), Ohio State men's basketball head coach (2024–present)
