= Upper Sandusky Exempted Village School District =

School district in Ohio, United States

Address
- 800 North Sandusky Avenue Upper Sandusky, Ohio, 43351; United States
- Coordinates: 40°49′47″N 83°16′45″W

District information
- Type: Public
- Grades: KG–12
- Schools: 5
- NCES District ID: 3910024

Students and staff
- Students: 1,560 (2025–2026)
- Teachers: 95.07 (on an FTE basis) (2025–2026)
- Staff: 156.93 (on an FTE basis) (2025–2026)
- Student–teacher ratio: 16.41 (2025–2026)

Other information
- Website: www.usevs.org

Upper Sandusky Exempted Village School District is a school district in Northwest Ohio. The school district serves students who live in the city of Upper Sandusky, in Wyandot County. The superintendent is Laurie Vent.

== Schools ==
=== Grades 9–12 ===
- Upper Sandusky High School

=== Grades 6–8 ===
- Upper Sandusky Middle School

=== Grades K–5 ===
- East Elementary School
- South Elementary School
- Union Elementary School
