= Hiram Northup =

American banker and businessman (1818–1893)

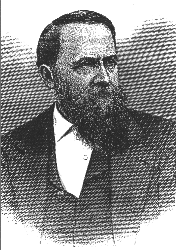
- Born: Hiram Milton Northup; June 4, 1818; Olean, New York, US
- Died: March 22, 1893 (aged 74)
- Burial place: Huron Cemetery, Kansas City, Kansas, US
- Occupations: Banker, businessman

Hiram Milton Northup (June 4, 1818 – March 22, 1893) was an American banker and businessman. He worked closely with the Native American people.

== Biography ==
Northup was born on June 4, 1818, in Olean, New York. His father, Andruss Bishop Northrup, was also a banker, who died in 1892. His mother was Martha Northup, who died in 1820. Northup was of English descent.

In 1844, he moved to Kansas City, Missouri. There, he formed a partnership to trade with the Comanche. He later escaped to St. Louis after a mass death.

In St. Louis, he started a Native American trading business, which soon was shipping goods to Kansas City. He traded cloth products with Shawnee, Peoria, Piankeshaw, Pottawattami, Osage, Seneca, Sac and Fox and Cherokee peoples. He made a partnership with Silas Armstrong and Joel Walker of the Wyandot.

After their partnership ended, he began a partnership with Joseph S. Chick (1828–1908) in 1844, forming Northup & Chick banking firm. On September 23, 1854, along with other Kansas City settlers, Northup & Chick helped pool US$1000 to start the Kansas City Journal-Post. The bank dissolved in July 1893.

Northup died on March 22, 1893, aged 74, and is buried at Huron Cemetery.
