= Myeerah =

18th-century Native American woman

- Born: c. 1758
- Died: February 1816 (aged 57–58)
- Resting place: Zanesfield, Ohio, U.S.
- Other names: Myeerah Zane; White Crane; Walk-in-the-Water
- Title: Princess Myeerah
- Spouse: Isaac Zane (m. 1777)
- Children: 7
- Parent: Chief Tarhe (father)

Myeerah also known as "Princess Myeerah", "White Crane", and "Walk-in-the-Water" (c. 1758 – February 1816) was a Native American woman, belonging to the Wyandot people, notable for bringing "peace and goodwill" between white settlers and Native people. She was the daughter of Tarhe, the chief of the Porcupine clan of the Wyandot tribe along Lake Erie.

== Life ==
Myeerah was born around 1758 near present-day Sandusky, Ohio, along Lake Erie. Her father was Native American and her mother was French-Canadian. Her name is translated to "Walk-in-the-Water."

Her family lived in the Porcupine clan of the Wyandot tribe, where her father Tarhé was chief. Myeerah was referred to as "White Crane" by settlers because of her light complexion.

In 1777, Myeerah (then 19) married Isaac Zane, a member of the prominent Zane family. The union of Myeerah and Zane was as much a political alliance as it was a marital one. Their marriage helped to solidify the Wyandot tribe's alliance with the British during the American Revolution, and Zane served as the tribe's translator and emissary in treaty negotiations. After the Battle of Fallen Timbers of 1794, Myeerah and Zane played a crucial role in the Wyandot's alliance with America.

During their lives, Myeerah became known as "Princess Myeerah" and Zane was referred to as "White Eagle of the Wyandots."

Myeerah and Zane had three sons and four daughters together; most of whom married into the Wyandot tribe. Myeerah and Zane were the first settlers of Zanetown, now known as Zanesfield, Ohio, where they established the first fort in the area.

== Death ==
Myeerah died in February 1816, with her husband dying eight months later.

== Legacy ==
The village of Zanesfield, Ohio is named in honor of Myeerah and her husband. A historical marker in Zanesfield tells the story of Princess Myeerah and her husband.

A painting depicting Myeerah and Zane is on display at the Logan County Historical Society Museum in Bellefontaine, Ohio. The name Myeerah is still found and used in various locations in the Upper Ohio Valley, including the Myeerah Inn.

Myeerah's story was dramatized in the 1904 novel Betty Zane and in various other writings of Zane Grey.

In 1954, a highway and trail near Zanesfield were named the "Myeerah Trail" in honor of Princess Myeerah.
