= John Stewart (missionary) =

John Stewart (1786-1823) was a missionary to the Wyandot Indians of Ohio and founder of what is often considered the first Methodist mission in America. Stewart was born in Powhatan County, Virginia to free African-American parents who were of mixed ancestry; a mix of European, African, and Native American (specifically Saponi and possibly Chickahominy and/or Accomac).

== See also ==
- Wyandot Mission Church
- Upper Sandusky Reservation
- John McKendree Springer — Pioneer missionary in Africa
