= Huron Cemetery =

Historic tribal cemetery in Kansas City, Kansas

- U.S. National Register of Historic Places
- U.S. National Historic Landmark
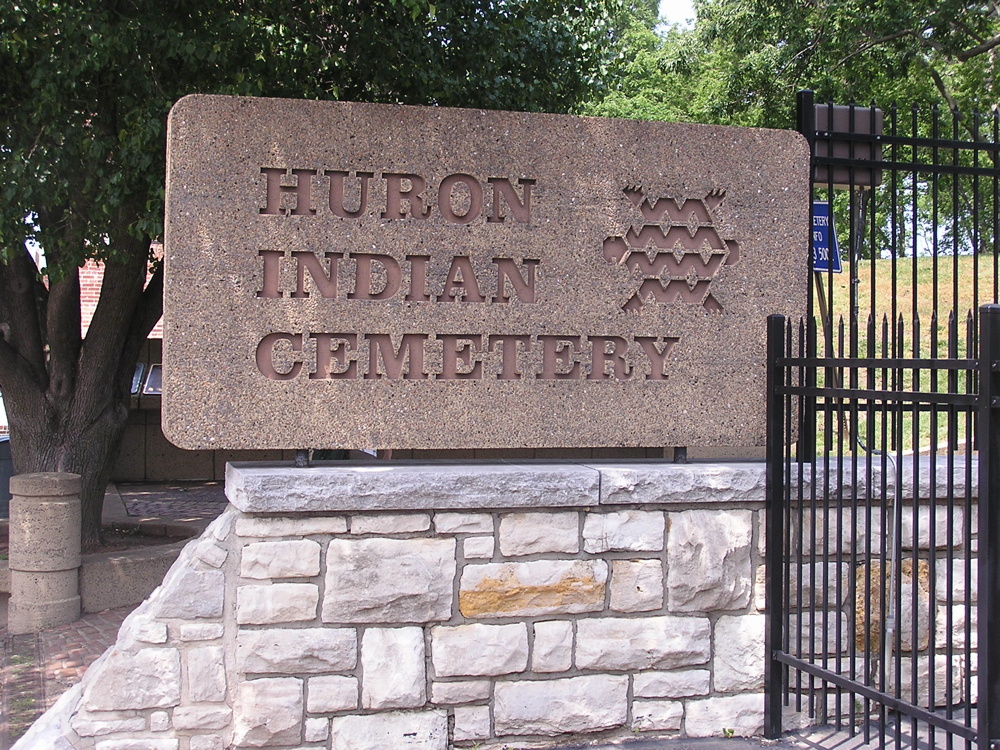
- The entrance sign

- Location within Kansas Location within the United States
- Location: Kansas City, Kansas
- Coordinates: 39°06′53″N 94°37′34″W
- Area: 2.5 acres (1.0 ha)
- Built: 1843; 183 years ago
- NRHP reference No.: 71000335

Significant dates
- Added to NRHP: September 3, 1971
- Designated NHL: December 23, 2016

The Huron Indian Cemetery in Kansas City, Kansas, also known as Huron Park Cemetery, is now formally known as the Wyandot National Burying Ground. It was established c. 1843, soon after the Wyandot (called Huron by French explorers) had arrived following removal from Ohio. The tribe settled in the area for years, with many in 1855 accepting allotment of lands in Kansas in severalty. The majority of the Wyandot removed to Oklahoma in 1867, where they maintained tribal institutions and communal property. As a federally recognized tribe, they had legal control over the communal property of Huron Cemetery. For more than 100 years, the property has been controversial between the federally recognized Wyandotte Nation, based in Oklahoma, which wanted to sell it for redevelopment, and the much smaller, unrecognized Wyandot Nation of Kansas, which wanted to preserve the burying ground.

The cemetery is located at North 7th Street Trafficway and Minnesota Avenue in Kansas City. It was listed on the National Register of Historic Places on September 3, 1971, and has been formally renamed the Wyandot National Burying Ground. It is in the Kansas City, Kansas Historic District. It was placed on the Register of Historic Kansas Places on July 1, 1977.

In the early 20th century, sisters Lyda, Helena, and Ida Conley in Kansas City, Kansas led a years-long battle to preserve the cemetery against forces wanting to develop it. In 1916 the cemetery gained some protection as a national park under legislation supported by Kansas Senator Charles Curtis. It continued to be subject to development pressure, with new proposals coming up about every decade. Passage of the 1990 Native American Graves Protection and Repatriation Act provided new protections, as lineal descendants of those interred must be consulted and they have a voice in disposition of cemeteries and gravesites. Lineal descendants among the Wyandot Nation of Kansas have strongly supported continued preservation of the cemetery in its original use.

In 1998, the Wyandotte Nation and Wyandot Nation of Kansas signed an agreement to use the Huron Cemetery only for religious, cultural or other activities compatible with use of the site as a burial ground. In December 2016 the cemetery was named as a National Historic Landmark.

== History of Wyandot tribe in Kansas ==
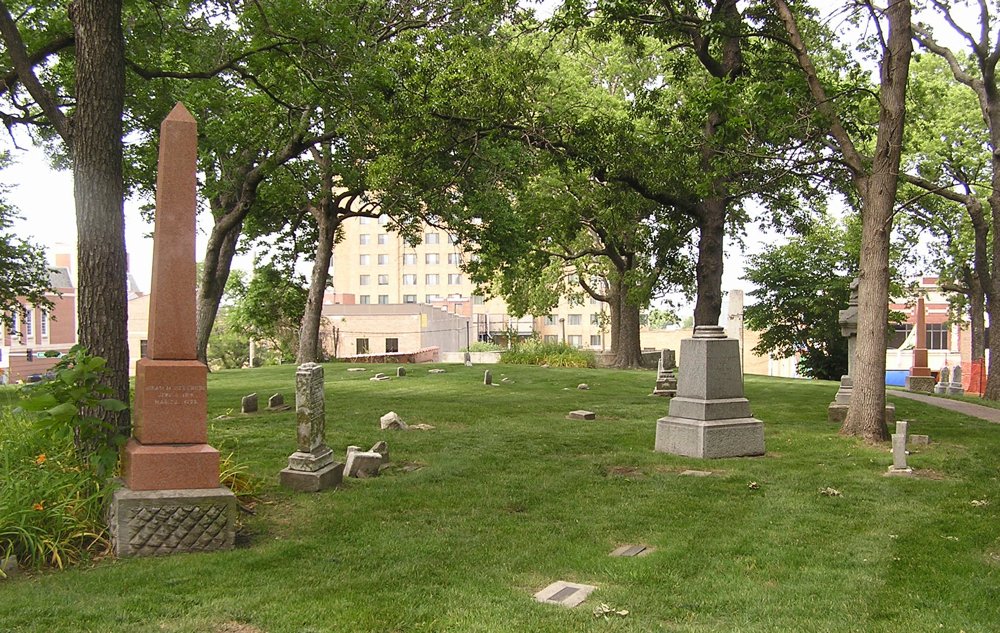
Graves at the Huron Indian Cemetery

The Wyandot migration from Ohio to Missouri and Kansas occurred from July 28–31, 1843, through the Great Flood of 1844. They began arriving at the confluence of the Missouri River and Kaw River and then settled in the Westport area until the Delaware sold them thirty-six sections and gave them three sections in memory of friendship in what is now Wyandotte County. They were living in a low-lying area and suffered epidemic illness. Survivors buried the dead in land on a ridge overlooking the Missouri River, which became known as the Huron Cemetery.

Later that year, the United States granted land in Kansas to the Wyandot that included the ridge. They continued to use it as a cemetery.

In 1855, the government accepted many of the Wyandot as United States citizens when they accepted allotments of communal land by household. Tribal government was dissolved. The Huron Cemetery remained part of communal holdings and was used by members in Kansas City. Four years later, the Town of Wyandot was incorporated, with the Huron Cemetery within its boundaries. This community later was annexed by Kansas City, Kansas in Wyandotte County.

In the mid-1850s, the Wyandot separately approved the sale of some of their land for the founding of the Quindaro Townsite. The town was founded as a free port-of-entry on the Missouri River in late 1856 by abolitionists in the Kansas territory. It was named after the Wyandot wife of one of the founders. Construction of buildings in the commercial section along the river began in 1857 and proceeded rapidly, as settlers were arriving from New England to help Kansas become a free state by being there to vote on its status. More residential areas were developed on the ridge above the river.

At Quindaro and on their own land, the Wyandot provided an important refuge for slaves escaping on the Underground Railroad. Some of the natives aided slaves who had escaped across the river from Missouri, and helped them travel further north to freedom.

After the American Civil War, in 1867 the majority of members who had not become citizens (or who said they wanted to be part of the tribe) was removed again, this time to 20,000 acres (81 km^{2}) in Oklahoma. Those members remaining in Kansas were considered "absentee" or "citizen class". Because the Oklahoma nation retained tribal institutions, its leaders retained legal authority over the communal land of the Huron Indian Cemetery.

Later, the Quindaro townsite was annexed by Kansas City, Kansas. By the 1890s, the Huron Indian Cemetery on the ridge was considered prime land in the expanding city. Wanting to purchase the cemetery land, developers negotiated with its legal owners, leaders of the Wyandotte Nation in Indian Territory (which became Oklahoma). In 1906, the Wyandotte through Congress instructed the United States Secretary of the Interior to sell the land. Nearby had been built the Carnegie Library and the Brund Hotel, and the Scottish Rites Masonic Temple was under reconstruction following a fire. Sale proceeds went to the Wyandotte Nation, based in Oklahoma. Indian remains from the Huron Cemetery were to be moved to the Quindaro Cemetery nearby in Kansas City.

Over the years as Kansas City developed, the cemetery repeatedly was the center of controversy between preservation interests versus development interests. The struggle has also been between the unrecognized Wyandot Nation of Kansas and the federally recognized Wyandotte Nation. Since the late 19th century, the latter group was the only one with legal authority over the site. Lyda Conley and her two sisters of Kansas City launched a public relations and legal defense to prevent the sale. They were joined by other local Wyandot descendants, as well as by women's clubs and similar associations. In the course of this, in 1909 Lyda Conley became the first Native American woman attorney to be admitted to the bar of the US Supreme Court, as she carried the case there. Though sympathetic, the Court did not support her attempt to prevent the sale of land.

In 1916, with the aid of Kansas Senator Charles Curtis, a multi-racial member of the Kaw tribe and future Vice President of the United States, Congress passed legislation to protect the Huron Indian Cemetery as a park. The federal government entered into an agreement with Kansas City for its maintenance.

The city and the Wyandotte Nation have continued to consider development on the site that would require removal of Wyandot remains. The Wyandot Nation of Kansas incorporated as a nonprofit in 1959. It has been seeking federal recognition in recent years and strongly supports maintenance of the cemetery as an historic site.

The cemetery's prime location continues to bring development interest. In recognition of its historic importance, it was listed on the National Register of Historic Places on September 3, 1971. It has been formally renamed the Wyandot National Burying Ground.

Included within the Kansas City, Kansas Historic District, the cemetery was also listed on the Register of Historic Kansas Places on July 1, 1977. In 1978–1979, the city installed new grave markers.

== Modern ==
Scholars believe that there are more than 400 and up to 800 graves, few marked. Burials were still being made in the late 20th century.

In 1991, the Kansas City government installed more than 70 new grave markers in consultation with the tribe and archaeologists, to replace some that had been put in during the 1970s.

In 1994, the chief of the Wyandotte Nation evaluated the Huron Park Cemetery as a possible location of a gaming casino, a major revenue generator for Native American tribes. Representatives of the Wyandot Nation of Kansas protested to their Congressional delegation. The Bureau of Indian Affairs (BIA) noted that no action could occur without substantial consultation with various agencies and, most importantly, consent from the lineal descendants of individuals interred at the Huron Park Cemetery, as required in the Native American Graves Protection and Repatriation Act of 1990.

In 1998, after more than 100 years of disagreement, finally the Wyandotte Nation and Wyandot Nation of Kansas signed an agreement to use the Huron Cemetery only for religious, cultural, or other compatible sacred activities. This states that the Oklahoma nation would not oppose the Wyandot Nation of Kansas's attempt to gain federal recognition. That tribe is currently recognized by the state. In 2016, the cemetery was designated a National Historic Landmark.

== Notable burials ==
- Silas Armstrong (1810–1865), merchant and politician; served as chief of the Wyandotte Nation from 1858 to his death in 1865
- Lyda Conley (c. 1869–1946), lawyer; protected the sale of Huron Cemetery
- Helena Conley (1864–1958), activist
- Hiram Northup (1818–1893), banker and businessman; worked closely with Wyandot people

== See also ==
- List of National Historic Landmarks in Kansas
- Mother Solomon – activist for the Huron Cemetery
