= James Bradley Finley =

American clergyman (1781–1857)

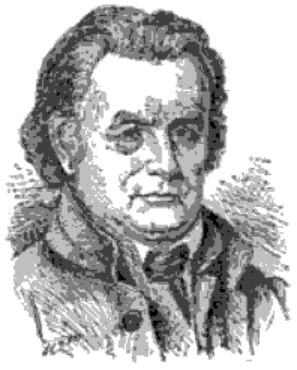
- From The National Cyclopaedia of America Biography, 1904
- Born: July 1, 1781; North Carolina
- Died: September 6, 1857 (aged 76); Eaton, Ohio
- Occupation: Clergyman
- Spouse: Hannah Strane (m. 1801)

James Bradley Finley (July 1, 1781 – September 6, 1857) was an American clergyman.

== Biography ==
James Bradley Finley was born in North Carolina on July 1, 1781, where his father was working as a Presbyterian minister. The family settled in Virginia, and later emigrated to Ohio. A move to Kentucky was frustrated by land pirates, and the family returned to Ohio. James grew up as a backwoodsman, familiar with forests, their lore and their inhabitants. His father ran a school during the stay in Kentucky, and there James was schooled in the classics. James also studied medicine, and began a practice in 1800. Upon his 1801 marriage to Hannah Strane, he built a cabin and returned to the backwoods life.

He joined the Ohio conference of the Methodist Episcopal Church in 1808, and was ordained as a minister in 1812. From 1816 to 1821 he was presiding elder of the Steubenville, Ohio, and Lebanon districts. In 1821 he was sent as missionary to the Wyandot people, where he remained six years at the Wyandot Mission Church. Retaining the superintendency of this mission for two years, he subsequently continued in the itinerant ministry as pastor and presiding elder till 1845, when he was appointed chaplain of the Ohio Penitentiary. He retained this office till 1849. During his later years he acted as conference missionary and pastor of churches in southern Ohio.

He died in Eaton, Ohio on September 6, 1857.

== Works ==
His chief works are:

- Autobiography (Cincinnati, 1853)
- History of the Wyandott mission, at Upper Sandusky, Ohio (Cincinnati, 1840)
- Sketches of Western Methodism (1854)
- Life among the Indians (1857)
- Memorials of Prison Life (1860)
