= Zanesfield, Ohio =

- Village
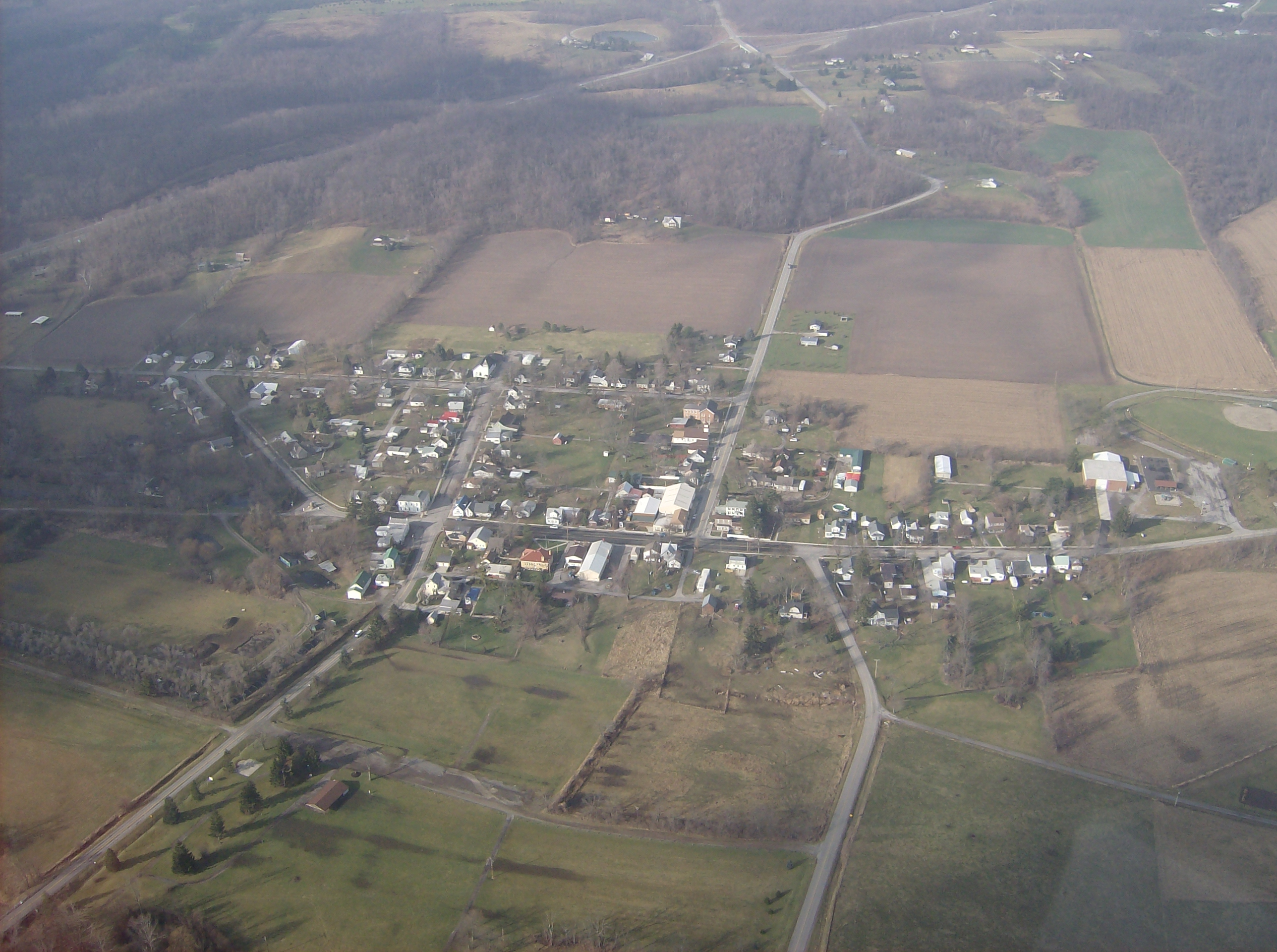
- Aerial view of Zanesfield from the east

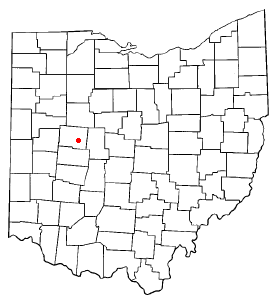
- Location of Zanesfield, Ohio

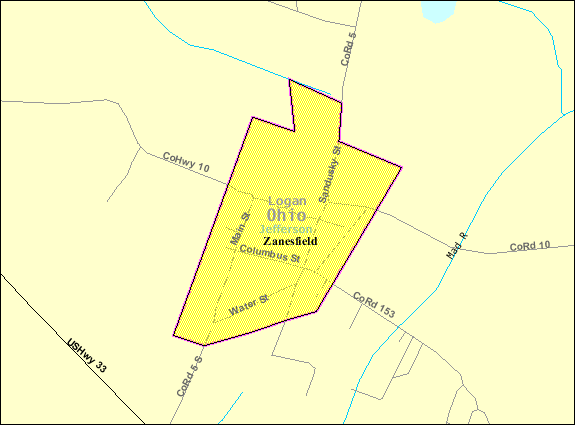
- Detailed map of Zanesfield
- Coordinates: 40°20′19″N 83°40′40″W
- Country: United States
- State: Ohio
- County: Logan
- Township: Jefferson
- Platted: 1819
- Named for: Isaac Zane

Area
  - Total: 0.10 sq mi (0.27 km^{2})
  - Land: 0.10 sq mi (0.27 km^{2})
  - Water: 0 sq mi (0.00 km^{2})
- Elevation: 1,175 ft (358 m)

Population (2020)
  - Total: 194
  - Density: 1,836.1/sq mi (708.92/km^{2})
- Time zone: UTC-5 (Eastern (EST))
  - Summer (DST): UTC-4 (EDT)
- ZIP code: 43360
- Area codes: 937, 326
- FIPS code: 39-88070
- GNIS feature ID: 2399757

Zanesfield is a village in Logan County, Ohio, United States of America. The population was 194 at the 2020 census. It is the smallest incorporated village in Logan County.

== History ==
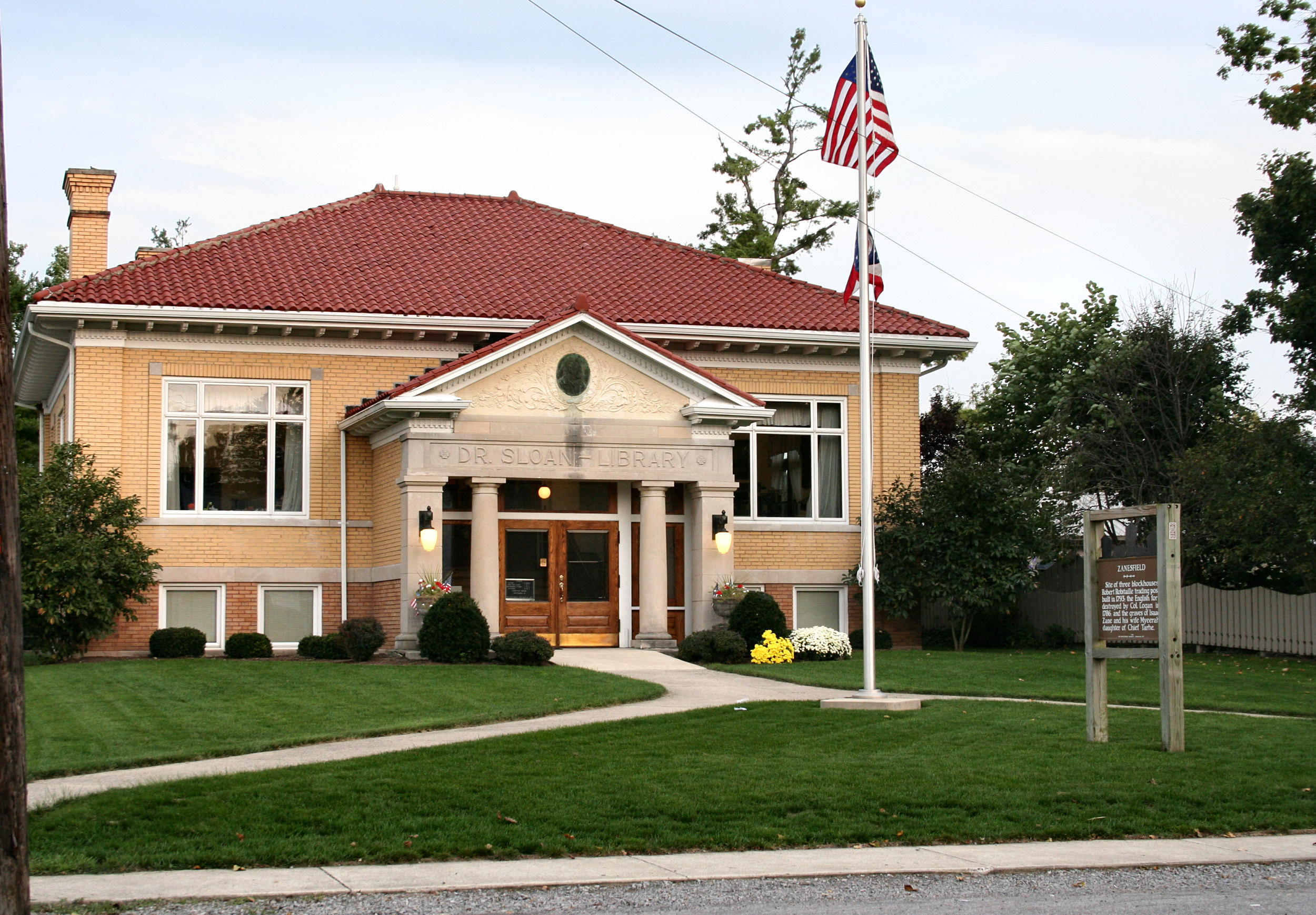
Historic Sloan Library in Zanesfield

Zanesfield is named for Isaac Zane, who was born in 1753 in what was then Berkeley County, Virginia, and is now Hardy County, West Virginia. He was the youngest brother of Ebenezer Zane, for whom Zanesville, Ohio, is named.

In 1762 at the age of nine, Isaac was captured by Native Americans of the Wyandot tribe and adopted into the tribe. He lived with them along the Sandusky River for seventeen years. He married Myeerah (White Crane), daughter of Chief Tarhe. They had several children.

His Wyandot connections and bilingual abilities served Zane well. He later served as a guide to the Commissioners of the Northwest Territory during their treaty conferences with the Native Americans. Zane purchased 1,800 acres (7.3 km^{2}) from the federal government at the site of Zanesfield in about 1795. In return for his service to the United States, in 1802, the United States Congress granted Isaac Zane three tracts totalling 1,920 acres (7.8 km^{2}) in Champaign County, Ohio (see Zane's Tracts#Isaac Zane Tracts). In 1803, he was elected as one of the first trustees of Jefferson Township. Isaac Zane died in 1816, and was buried near Zanesfield.

The village was laid out in 1819 by Alexander Long and Ebenezer Zane.

== Geography ==
According to the United States Census Bureau, the village has a total area of 0.11 square miles (0.28 km^{2}), all of it land.

== Demographics ==
Historical population
Census	Pop.	Note	%±
1850	317		—
1860	328		3.5%
1870	282		−14.0%
1880	307		8.9%
1890	318		3.6%
1900	278		−12.6%
1910	250		−10.1%
1920	243		−2.8%
1930	262		7.8%
1940	277		5.7%
1950	288		4.0%
1960	288		0.0%
1970	272		−5.6%
1980	269		−1.1%
1990	183		−32.0%
2000	220		20.2%
2010	197		−10.5%
2020	194		−1.5%
U.S. Decennial Census

=== 2010 census ===
As of the census of 2010, there were 197 people, 88 households, and 62 families living in the village. The population density was 1,790.9 inhabitants per square mile (691.5/km^{2}). There were 101 housing units at an average density of 918.2 per square mile (354.5/km^{2}). The racial makeup of the village was 96.4% White, 2.0% African American, 1.0% Pacific Islander, and 0.5% from two or more races.

There were 88 households, of which 27.3% had children under the age of 18 living with them, 54.5% were married couples living together, 11.4% had a female householder with no husband present, 4.5% had a male householder with no wife present, and 29.5% were non-families. 22.7% of all households were made up of individuals, and 6.8% had someone living alone who was 65 years of age or older. The average household size was 2.24 and the average family size was 2.65.

The median age in the village was 42.4 years. 22.8% of residents were under the age of 18; 4.7% were between the ages of 18 and 24; 26.4% were from 25 to 44; 32% were from 45 to 64; and 14.2% were 65 years of age or older. The gender makeup of the village was 43.7% male and 56.3% female.

=== 2000 census ===
As of the census of 2000, there were 220 people, 96 households, and 57 families living in the village. The population density was 1,867.6 inhabitants per square mile (721.1/km^{2}). There were 105 housing units at an average density of 891.4 per square mile (344.2/km^{2}). The racial makeup of the village was 99.09% White, 0.45% Native American, and 0.45% from two or more races. There are no Hispanics or Latinos of any race.

There were 96 households, out of which 29.2% had children under the age of 18 living with them, 49.0% were married couples living together, 6.3% had a female householder with no husband present, and 39.6% were non-families. 35.4% of all households were made up of individuals, and 13.5% had someone living alone who was 65 years of age or older. The average household size was 2.29 and the average family size was 3.07.

In the village, the population was spread out, with 25.5% under the age of 18, 8.2% from 18 to 24, 30.0% from 25 to 44, 23.2% from 45 to 64, and 13.2% who were 65 years of age or older. The median age was 35 years. For every 100 females, there were 93.0 males. For every 100 females age 18 and over, there were 102.5 males.

The median income for a household in the village was $41,667, and the median income for a family was $57,500. Males had a median income of $36,786 versus $23,500 for females. The per capita income for the village was $19,869. None of the families and 0.9% of the population were living below the poverty line, including no under eighteens and 4.3% of those over 64.

== Education ==
Zanesfield is served by the Benjamin Logan Local School District and home to a private school with an outdoor education model, Journey Nature School.

The village has a public library, the Earl Sloan Library.

== Transportation ==
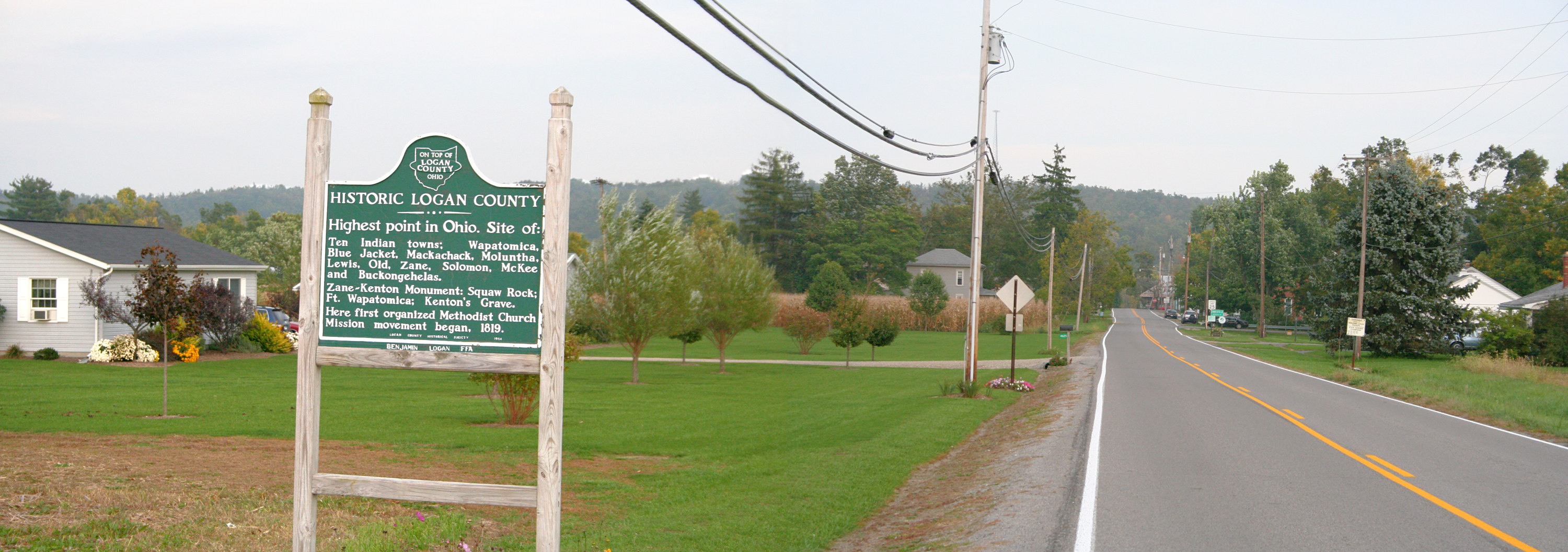
Zanesfield village limits

Unlike most villages in Logan County, Zanesfield has no state highways; the only road access is provided through County Roads 5, 10, and 153. The nearest highway is U.S. Route 33, a freeway with two interchanges a short distance from Zanesfield. Originally, U.S. 33 ran from Bellefontaine along a portion of the present-day County Road 540 then southwards entering on Water Street through Zanesfield and then southeast along Columbus Street before its move to its current location outside the village in 1964.

The Bellefontaine & Delaware Railroad had attempted to reach Zanesfield in the early to mid, 1850's however, work was suspended sometime in July of 1855 by court order. The first Railroad to reach Zanesfield was the Detroit & Lima Northern Railroad which laid track sometime throughout 1898. The railroad came out of Bellefontaine as the Bellefontaine & Delaware had intended, diverging from the Mad River & Lake Erie Railroad a little north of West Lake Avenue in Bellefontaine. The Railroad crossed County Road 5 near U.S. 33. The line curved toward U.S. 33 passing by what is now the Zanesfield Rod and Gun club located passed the gate near the Issac Zane and Simon Kenton memorial stone in Zanesfield. Continuing east into what is now the Zanesfield Cemetery continuing east between County Road 153 and U.S. 33 before curving into East Liberty alongside County Road 292. The line split the land used for the East Liberty Auto Plant before traveling a couple miles and connecting to what is now CSX's Scottslawn Secondary line in Peoria. Between the Cemetery and club stood a passenger station, grain elevator, water tower, and slaughterhouse. Just outside of Zanesfield the Railroad also served a gravel and shale pit. The line saw grain, hay, livestock, lumber, and passenger traffic throughout its lifetime. Three years after the Detroit & Lima Northern Railroad laid track in Zanesfield the Railroad became the Toledo & Ohio Central Railroad which was a subsidiary of the New York Central Railroad due to poor management practices leading up to the operation of the rail line in Zanesfield. Service on the line slowly came to a halt with passenger service on the line ending sometime in 1929 than freight service three years later partially due to the competition of road and air travel as well as an economic crash in 1929 (The Great Depression) among other factors.

== Notable people ==
- Nicole Fawcett — award-winning volleyball player
- Earl Sloan — entrepreneur and philanthropist
