= Tarhe =

Native American Wyandot leader (1742–1818)

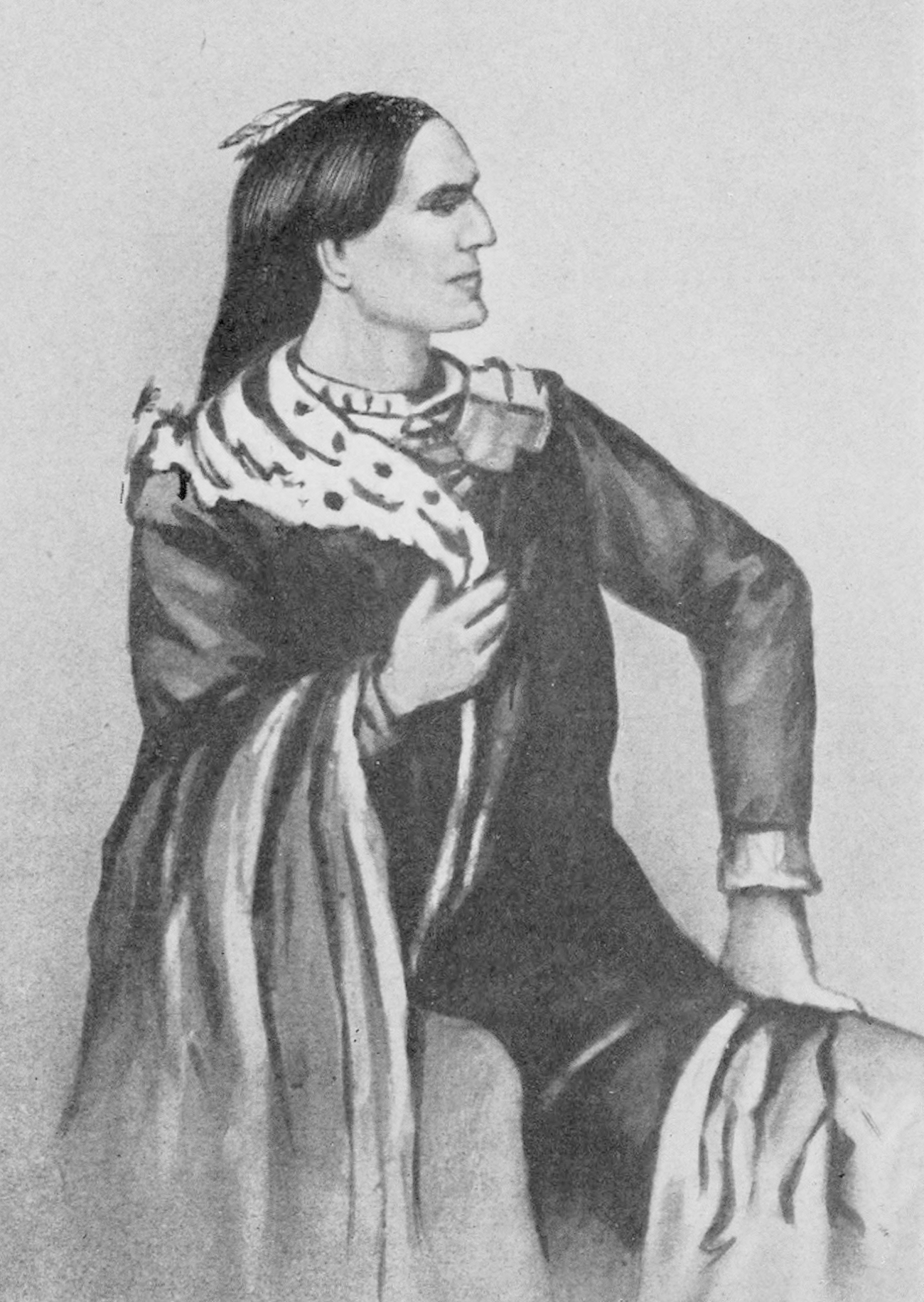
From an 1817 print

Tarhe (Wyandot: Tarhi, c. 1742–1818) was a leader of the Wyandot people in the Ohio Country. His nickname was "The Crane".

Tarhe fought American expansion into the region until the Northwestern Confederacy was defeated at the Battle of Fallen Timbers in 1794 during the Northwest Indian War. Although the exact number of Wyandot chiefs at the Battle of Fallen Timbers is still debated, Tarhe was the only chief to survive. He was a signatory to the Treaty of Greenville that ended the war.

Afterwards, he sought accommodation with the United States. He was signatory to later treaties, including the Treaty of Fort Industry (1805), which ceded land to the United States, and both the second Treaty of Greenville (1814) and the Treaty of Spring Wells, which helped end hostilities at the end of the War of 1812.

The Chief Tarhe Monument commemorates his death in 1818 in Crane Town (Tarhetown), on the former Upper Sandusky Reservation.

His daughter, Myeerah, became one of the namesakes of Zanesfield, Ohio.

The Sikorsky CH-54 cargo helicopter is named the "Tarhe" in his honor.
