= Sandusky River =

River in Ohio, USA

Coordinates: 41.4708°N 82.8973°W

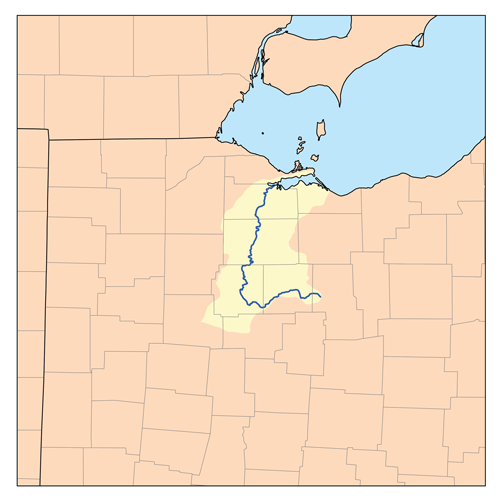
Map of the Sandusky River watershed.

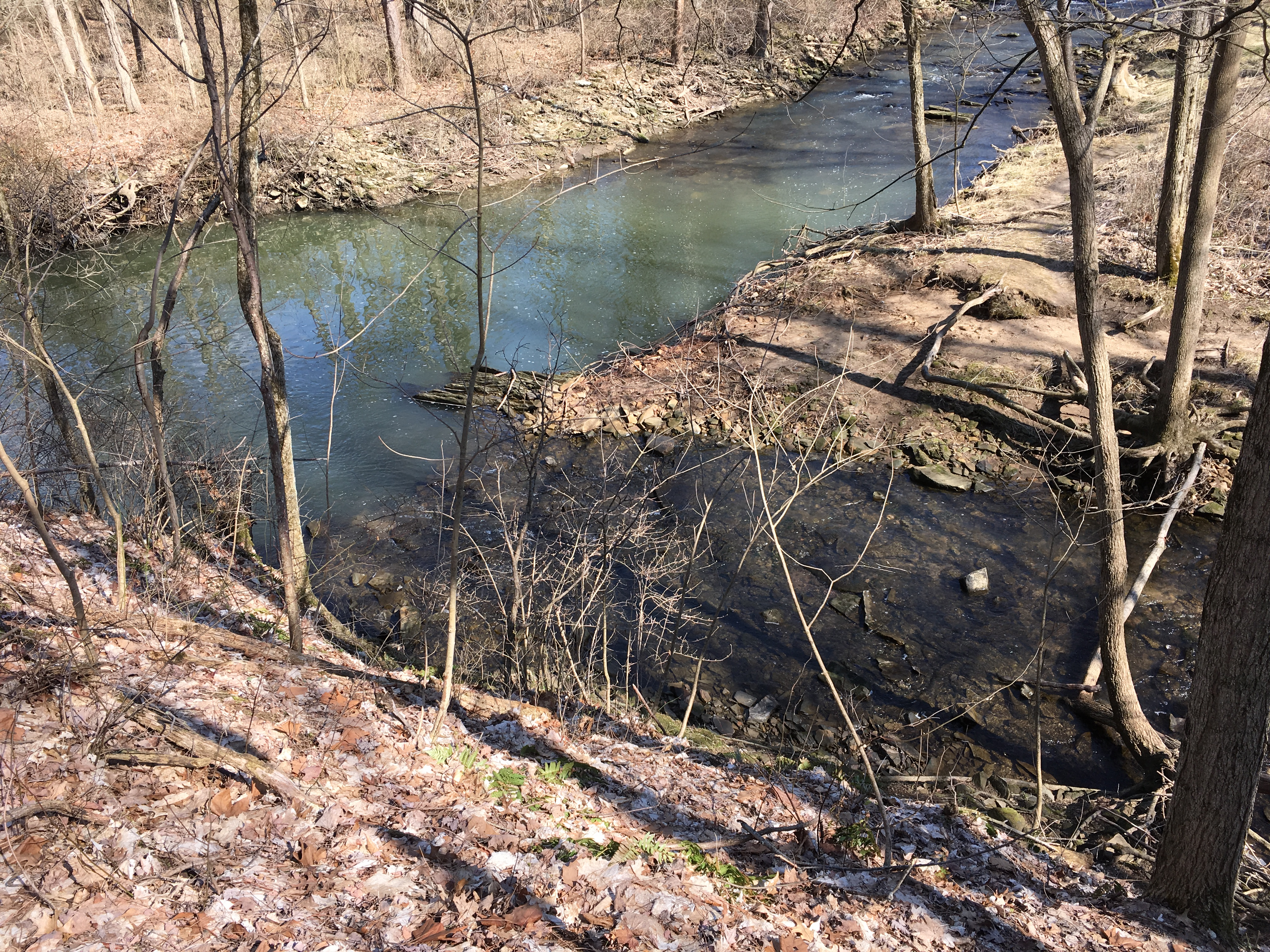
Paramour Creek and the smaller Allen Run joining to form the Sandusky River in Crawford County, Ohio.

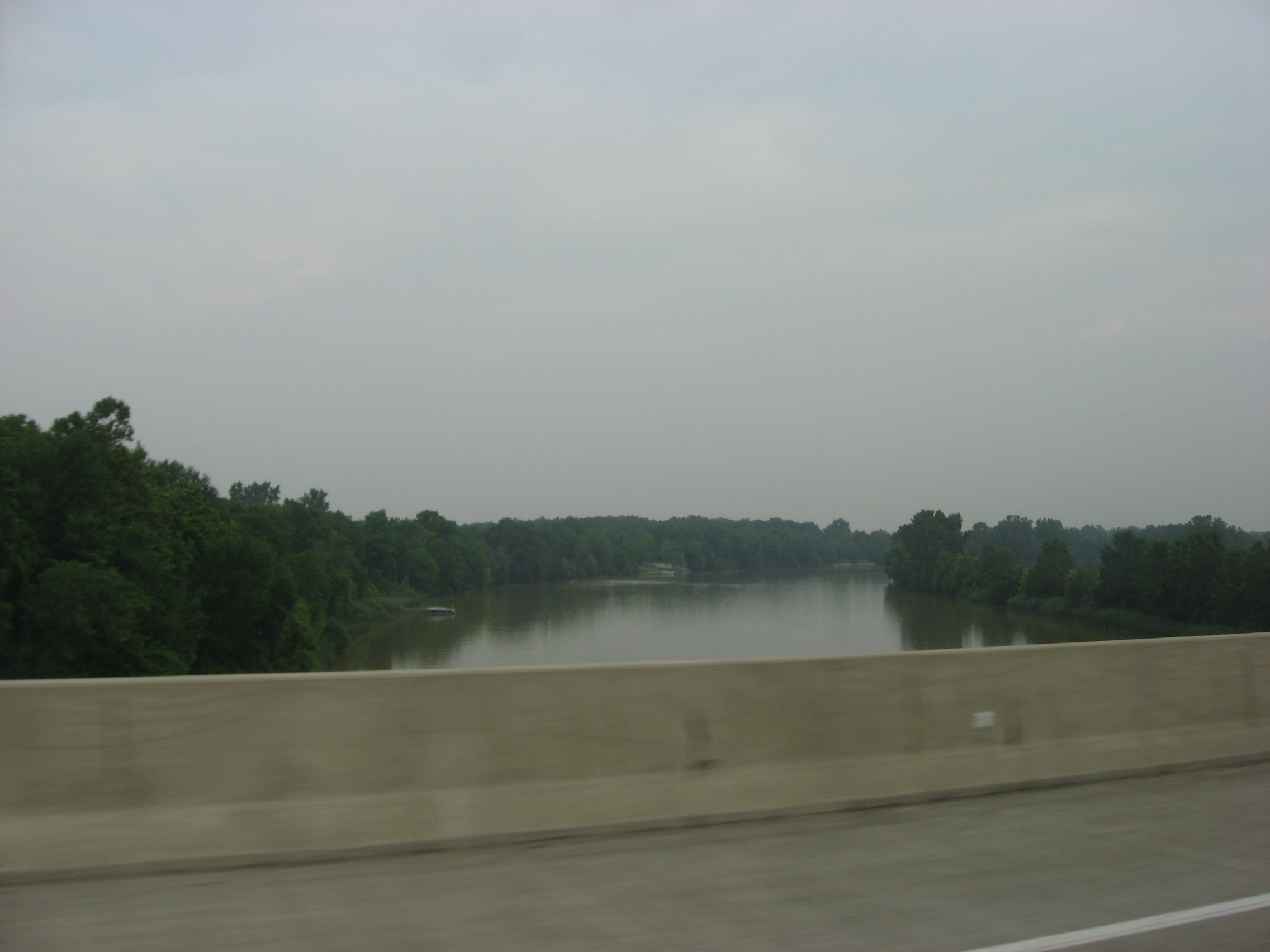
Along the Sandusky River below Fremont

The Sandusky River (Wyandot: saandusti; Shawnee: Potakihiipi) is a tributary to Lake Erie in north-central Ohio in the United States. It is about 133 miles (214 km) long and flows into Lake Erie at the southwest side of Sandusky Bay.

The Sandusky River, like the Maumee River to the west, is home to the annual walleye run in the spring, specifically March–April. The river also receives a run of white bass around the same time in the spring. The numbers of walleye that return to spawn upstream are not as great as those that return to the Maumee River. The Ballville Dam, built on the Sandusky River in Fremont, Ohio, blocked migration for walleye and other fish. As fish can swim farther upstream in the Maumee, they have access to more spawning areas and have developed a larger population than in the Sandusky River.

Opponents of the dam projected that its removal would improve access for walleye and other migratory fish to areas upstream and lead to an increase in their population, as has happened on other rivers where dams have been removed. The Ballville Dam was no longer used for power generation or navigation improvements. The city of Fremont undertook a study to explore the options of tearing it down or repairing it. A 2014 study found that removal would have little adverse effect on city conditions and would strongly improve the fisheries. In 2016 voters approved taking down the dam. (Note: The Balville dam was demolished in July 2018).

The river's name derives from the Wyandot words saandusti, meaning "water (within water-pools)" or from andusti, meaning "cold water". It was transliterated in various spellings by French and English colonists.

== Course ==
The Sandusky River begins at the juncture of Paramour Creek and Allen Run at the unincorporated community of Leesville in Crawford County west of Crestline, and initially flows westwardly, passing through the town of Bucyrus. In Wyandot County, the river turns northward for the remainder of its course, flowing through Seneca and Sandusky counties and passing the towns of Upper Sandusky, Tiffin and Fremont before entering Sandusky Bay.

In 1970, the river's course between Upper Sandusky and Fremont was designated as a State Scenic River by the government of Ohio.

== Little Sandusky River ==
The Little Sandusky River is a minor tributary of the Sandusky. It flows 14.0 miles (22.5 km) northward from near Brush Ridge in northern Marion County and joins the Sandusky in southern Wyandot County.

== Variant names ==
According to the Geographic Names Information System, the Sandusky River has also been known as:

- Potake Sepe
- Riviere Blanc
- Riviere Sanduski
- San-doo-stee River

== See also ==
- List of rivers of Ohio
- Upper Sandusky Reservation, a former Native American reservation located at the great bend of the Sandusky River
