= Upper Sandusky, Ohio =

- City
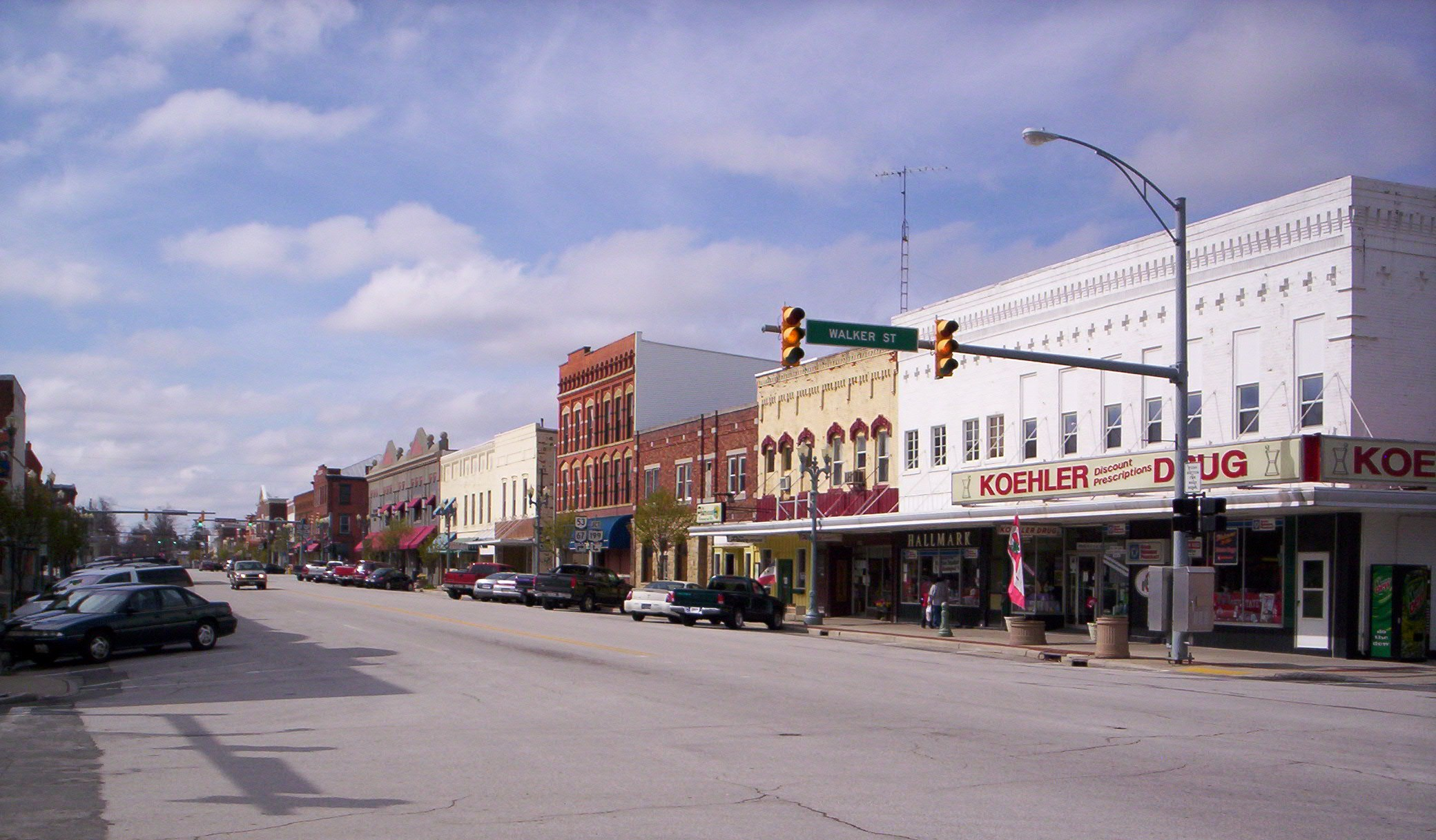
- Downtown Upper Sandusky on North Sandusky Avenue
- Motto: Small town living with big business appeal
- Interactive map of Upper Sandusky, Ohio
- Location within Ohio Location within the United States
- Coordinates: 40°49′39″N 83°16′53″W
- Country: United States
- State: Ohio
- County: Wyandot
- Township: Crane

Area
  - Total: 6.93 sq mi (17.96 km^{2})
  - Land: 6.75 sq mi (17.48 km^{2})
  - Water: 0.19 sq mi (0.48 km^{2})
- Elevation: 820 ft (250 m)

Population (2020)
  - Total: 6,698
  - Density: 992/sq mi (383.1/km^{2})
- Time zone: UTC-5 (Eastern (EST))
  - Summer (DST): UTC-4 (EDT)
- ZIP code: 43351
- Area codes: 419, 567
- FIPS code: 39-79044
- GNIS feature ID: 2397094
- Website: http://www.uppersanduskyoh.com/

Upper Sandusky is a city in and the county seat of Wyandot County, Ohio, United States, along the upper Sandusky River. The city lies approximately 59 miles (95 km) south of Toledo and 62 miles (100 km) north of Columbus. The population was 6,698 at the 2020 census.

The city was founded in 1843 and named for an earlier Wyandot village of the same name, which was located nearby. Despite what its name may suggest, Upper Sandusky is actually about 55 miles (89 km) southwest of the city of Sandusky. It was named "Upper" because it is located near the headwaters of the Sandusky River, which flows downriver through the city of Sandusky and empties into Lake Erie.

== History ==
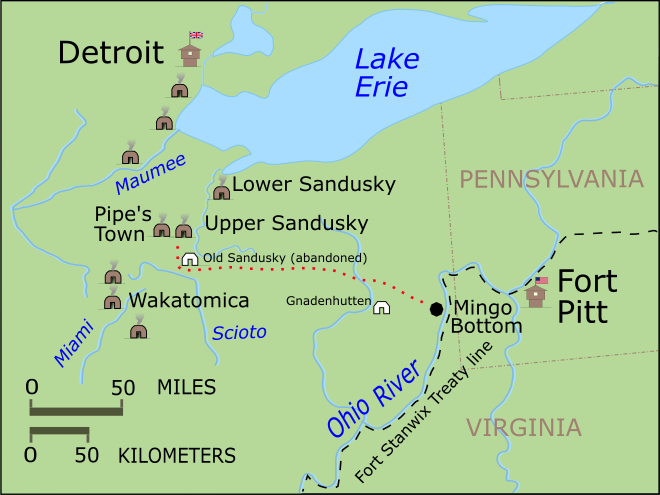
Upper Sandusky and surrounding villages at the time of the 1782 Sandusky Expedition

Upper Sandusky was a 19th-century Wyandot town named for its location at the headwaters of the Sandusky River in northwestern Ohio. This was the primary Wyandot town during the American Revolutionary War (1775–1783), and was sometimes also known as Half-King's Town, after Dunquat, the Wyandot "half-king". The town and the surrounding settlements, like Captain Pipe's Town, were closely allied with the British at Fort Detroit. During the Crawford expedition of 1782, Pennsylvania militiamen sought to destroy the town after the Wyandot began killing American settlers in the region, but were defeated en route.

After the war, in September 1783, a number of Native Americans met at Upper Sandusky and formed the Western Confederacy, a confederation intended to resist U.S. expansion into the Northwest Territory. The Northwest Indian War followed.

In the War of 1812, the village became the site of Fort Feree (or Ferree) on a bluff overlooking the flood plain of the Sandusky River The Fort was built in late 1812 by Pennsylvania militia led by Lieutenant Colonel Joel Ferree, by order of General William Henry Harrison.

Upper Sandusky became part of the Wyandot reservation in the area created by the Treaty of Fort Meigs in 1817. Prior to that, it was in northwestern Ohio Indian country above the Greenville Treaty line of 1795. Numerous indigenous Wyandot kept their settlements here until 1842, when they were driven out under the Indian Removal Act of 1830 to what became Wyandotte County, Kansas. A small community of free Black people also lived in the old village.

A new town of Upper Sandusky was platted nearby the forcibly abandoned Wyandot village in 1843 and the first colonizer's house was built in 1845. The first building in town was the county jail in 1846. It was designated as the seat of Wyandot County in 1848.

== Geography ==
According to the United States Census Bureau, the city has a total area of 7.19 square miles (18.62 km^{2}), of which 7.01 square miles (18.16 km^{2}) is land and 0.18 square miles (0.47 km^{2}) is water.

== Demographics ==
Historical population
| Census | Pop. | Note | %± |
|---|---|---|---|
| 1850 | 754 | | — |
| 1860 | 1,599 | | 112.1% |
| 1870 | 2,564 | | 60.4% |
| 1880 | 3,540 | | 38.1% |
| 1890 | 3,572 | | 0.9% |
| 1900 | 3,355 | | −6.1% |
| 1910 | 3,779 | | 12.6% |
| 1920 | 3,708 | | −1.9% |
| 1930 | 3,889 | | 4.9% |
| 1940 | 3,907 | | 0.5% |
| 1950 | 4,397 | | 12.5% |
| 1960 | 4,941 | | 12.4% |
| 1970 | 5,645 | | 14.2% |
| 1980 | 5,972 | | 5.8% |
| 1990 | 5,906 | | −1.1% |
| 2000 | 6,533 | | 10.6% |
| 2010 | 6,596 | | 1.0% |
| 2020 | 6,698 | | 1.5% |
| 2025 (est.) | 6,661 | | −0.6% |

=== 2020 census ===
As of the 2020 census, Upper Sandusky had a population of 6,698. The median age was 42.5 years. 21.9% of residents were under the age of 18 and 22.1% of residents were 65 years of age or older. For every 100 females there were 88.9 males, and for every 100 females age 18 and over there were 84.3 males age 18 and over.

98.7% of residents lived in urban areas, while 1.3% lived in rural areas.

There were 2,922 households in Upper Sandusky, of which 26.6% had children under the age of 18 living in them. Of all households, 40.2% were married-couple households, 18.8% were households with a male householder and no spouse or partner present, and 32.6% were households with a female householder and no spouse or partner present. About 36.2% of all households were made up of individuals and 16.9% had someone living alone who was 65 years of age or older.

There were 3,159 housing units, of which 7.5% were vacant. The homeowner vacancy rate was 1.5% and the rental vacancy rate was 5.8%.

Racial composition as of the 2020 census
| Race | Number | Percent |
|---|---|---|
| White | 6,193 | 92.5% |
| Black or African American | 28 | 0.4% |
| American Indian and Alaska Native | 4 | 0.1% |
| Asian | 31 | 0.5% |
| Native Hawaiian and Other Pacific Islander | 2 | 0.0% |
| Some other race | 181 | 2.7% |
| Two or more races | 259 | 3.9% |
| Hispanic or Latino (of any race) | 349 | 5.2% |

=== 2010 census ===
As of the census of 2010, there were 6,596 people, 2,882 households, and 1,724 families residing in the city. The population density was 940.9 inhabitants per square mile (363.3/km^{2}). There were 3,180 housing units at an average density of 453.6 per square mile (175.1/km^{2}). The racial makeup of the city was 95.0% White, 0.3% African American, 0.2% Native American, 0.8% Asian, 2.6% from other races, and 1.2% from two or more races. Hispanic or Latino people of any race were 4.3% of the population.

There were 2,882 households, of which 28.1% had children under the age of 18 living with them, 42.3% were married couples living together, 13.1% had a female householder with no husband present, 4.5% had a male householder with no wife present, and 40.2% were non-families. 34.8% of all households were made up of individuals, and 17.1% had someone living alone who was 65 years of age or older. The average household size was 2.24 and the average family size was 2.83.

The median age in the city was 41 years. 22.7% of residents were under the age of 18; 7.6% were between the ages of 18 and 24; 24.2% were from 25 to 44; 25.3% were from 45 to 64; and 20.3% were 65 years of age or older. The gender makeup of the city was 46.9% male and 53.1% female.

=== 2000 census ===
As of the census of 2000, there were 6,533 people, 2,744 households, and 1,682 families residing in the city. The population density was 1,246.2 inhabitants per square mile (481.2/km^{2}). There were 2,910 housing units at an average density of 555.1 per square mile (214.3/km^{2}). The racial makeup of the city was 97.15% White, 0.18% Black or African American, 0.09% Native American, 0.57% Asian, 1.45% from other races, and 0.55% from two or more races. Hispanic or Latino people of any race were 2.71% of the population.

There were 2,744 households, out of which 28.9% had children under the age of 18 living with them, 47.7% were married couples living together, 11.1% had a female householder with no husband present, and 38.7% were non-families. 33.8% of all households were made up of individuals, and 15.4% had someone living alone who was 65 years of age or older. The average household size was 2.28 and the average family size was 2.93.

In the city, the population was spread out, with 23.5% under the age of 18, 8.3% from 18 to 24, 26.6% from 25 to 44, 21.7% from 45 to 64, and 19.9% who were 65 years of age or older. The median age was 39 years. For every 100 females, there were 86.5 males. For every 100 females age 18 and over, there were 82.2 males.

The median income for a household in the city was $35,613, and the median income for a family was $45,236. Males had a median income of $29,829 versus $22,526 for females. The per capita income for the city was $17,484. About 2.7% of families and 4.7% of the population were below the poverty line, including 4.5% of those under age 18 and 3.2% of those age 65 or over.

== Education ==
=== Public schools ===
Upper Sandusky Exempted Village School District operates three elementary schools, one middle school, and Upper Sandusky High School.

=== Public library ===
The city has a lending library, the Upper Sandusky Community Library.

== Notable people ==
- Edwina Dumm (1893–1990) – cartoonist of Cap Stubbs and Tippie
- Carl Karcher (1917–2008) – founder of Carl's Jr.
- Bob Schnelker (1928–2016) – National Football League professional football player and coach (Cleveland Browns, Philadelphia Eagles, New York Giants)
- Neil Armstrong (1930–2012) – first person to walk on the Moon; raised in Upper Sandusky
- Nate Reinking (born 1973) – professional basketball player in British and Belgian leagues, coach of Great Britain men's national team, assistant coach of Cleveland Cavaliers
- Jon Diebler (born 1988) – professional basketball player in Greek, Turkish, and Israeli leagues
