= Junundat =

Junundat, also called Junandot, Ayonontout, or Etionnontout, was a Wyandot village located south of Sandusky Bay, near modern-day Castalia, Ohio. Junundat was founded c. 1740 by Wyandots moving south from the vicinity of Fort Pontchartrain du Détroit in order to escape harassment by the Odawa (Ottawa). The village became a center for trade with the British until it was abandoned in 1747 during King George's War. It was reestablished in the early 1750s but abandoned a second time in 1763 during Pontiac's War.

== Name ==
Junundat is alternatively known as Junandot, Ayonontout or Etionnontout. Some sources have incorrectly identified the village as Sunyendeand or Junqueindundeh, however, these describe later Wyandot villages in the same region. The name "Junundat" means "one hill", while Junqueindundeh means "it has a rock".

== Location ==
Junundat was located south of Sandusky Bay. The site had a good water supply and arable land, making it attractive to both Indigenous and later European settlers. The Wyandot had used the site previously for their winter hunting camps. The exact location of the village has not been determined because of conflicting historical accounts. Junundat was likely located near present-day Castalia, Ohio.

== History ==
In 1738, the Wyandot living near Fort Pontchartrain du Détroit made peace with their long-standing enemy the Catawbas (Têtes-Plattes). As the Wyandot had failed to consult their Odawa allies, they were threatened and harassed, resulting in a temporarily relocation to Sandusky Bay. Upon returning to Détroit in 1739, the Wyandot debated whether they should move to the St. Lawrence River valley, remain near Détroit, or settle permanently at Sandusky. While the majority eventually decided to establish a village on Bois Blanc Island at the mouth of the Detroit River, a faction led by Angouirot and Nicholas Orontony returned to Sandusky and constructed a village south of the bay which they named Junundat. At Junundat they established contact with British traders, notably George Croghan, who were able to provide goods at lower prices than the French at Détroit.

During King George's War, the Wyandot, Odawa, Ojibwe and Potawatomi at Détroit initially supported the French, but withdrew their support when the war curtailed the supply of trade goods. Meanwhile, Orontony and the Junundat Wyandot supported the British. In 1747, they killed five French traders and plotted to massacre settlers at Détroit. They were thwarted when a "loyal" Wyandot woman overheard the planning and informed the Jesuit missionary Father Pierre-Philippe Potier at Bois Blanc Island. Potier hastened to Fort Pontchartrain and warned its commander, Paul-Joseph Le Moyne de Longueuil about the threat. Fearing retribution, Orontony led his faction south and established the village of Conchaké on the Muskingum River.

Following the death of Orontony in 1750, a smallpox epidemic in 1752, and the attack by Charles Michel de Langlade on the nearby British-aligned Miami village of Pickawillany, the Muskingum River settlement was abandoned. Some of the Conchaké Wyandot returned to Détroit, however, others returned to Sandusky.

In May 1763, during Pontiac's War, the Wyandot attacked Fort Sandusky and slaughtered the small British garrison. Two months later Junundat was destroyed by Captain James Dayell who was proceeding to Fort Detroit with reinforcements. The Wyandot abandoned their village at Dayell's approach and moved west to the Sandusky River valley. The Wyandot continued living in the Sandusky River valley until 1843 when they were forced to cede their land and move to Kansas.

== Bibliography ==
- Dixon, David (2005). Never Come to Peace Again: Pontiac's Uprising and the Fate of the British Empire in North America. Norman, Oklahoma: University of Oklahoma Press. ISBN 978-0806136561.
- Hodge, Frederick Webb (1911). Handbook of American Indians North of Mexico, Volume 1. Smithsonian Institution, Bureau of American Ethnology. ISBN 9781404740303.
- Misencik, Paul R.; Misencik, Sally E. (2020). American Indians of the Ohio Country in the 18th century. Jefferson, North Carolina: McFarland & Company. ISBN 978-1476638508.
- Hunter, William A. (1974). "Orontony (Orontondi, Rondoenie, Wanduny) (Nicolas)". Dictionary of Canadian Biography. Vol. 3. University of Toronto/Université Laval.
- Stockwell, Mary (2015). The Other Trail of Tears: The Removal of the Ohio Indians. Yardley, Pennsylvania: Westholme. ISBN 978-1594162107.
- Sturtevant, Andrew Keith (2011). Jealous Neighbors: Rivalry and Alliance among the Native Communities of Detroit, 1701–1706 (PhD thesis). College of William & Mary.
- Tanner, Helen, ed. (1987). Atlas of Great Lakes Indian History. Norman, Oklahoma: University of Oklahoma Press. ISBN 978-0806120560.
- White, Richard (1991). The Middle Ground: Indians, Empires, and Republics in the Great Lakes Region, 1650-1815. New York: Cambridge University Press. ISBN 978-0521183444.
