= Fort Sandoské =

Coordinates: 41°32′5″N 82°43′45″W

Fort Sandoské was a French military fort, built about 1750 on what is now called the Marblehead Peninsula on the northern side of Sandusky Bay in Ohio, near the traditional portage place from the bay to Lake Erie.

It was built at a site formerly occupied about 1745 by a trading-post run by mostly Pennsylvanian ("English") fur-traders, who had been given permission by Wyandot chief Nicolas Orontony. About 1748 or 1749, French soldiers from Fort Detroit expelled the English and took over the site. This specific site was never a British military outpost, but some historians asserted it had been. The English Fort Sandusky was not built until 1761 and it was constructed in a different location southeast of the bay. The future site of Venice, Ohio developed near here. That fort was overrun and destroyed in 1763 during Pontiac's War.

There was much confusion about the affiliation of trading posts and forts around Sandusky Bay. The French briefly used Fort Sandoské to secure supply and communication between Fort Niagara and Fort Detroit. It was already abandoned by 1754, when French lieutenant and engineer Gaspard-Joseph Chaussegros de Léry passed through the area with forces to reinforce Fort Detroit. He sketched the remains of this fort's layout/plan and included it in a campaign journal, one of eight of his held by Laval University in Quebec.
