= Fort Pontchartrain du Détroit =

French colonial fort in present-day Detroit, Michigan, US (1701–1796)

Coordinates: 42°19′41″N 83°02′52″W

- Detroit, Michigan
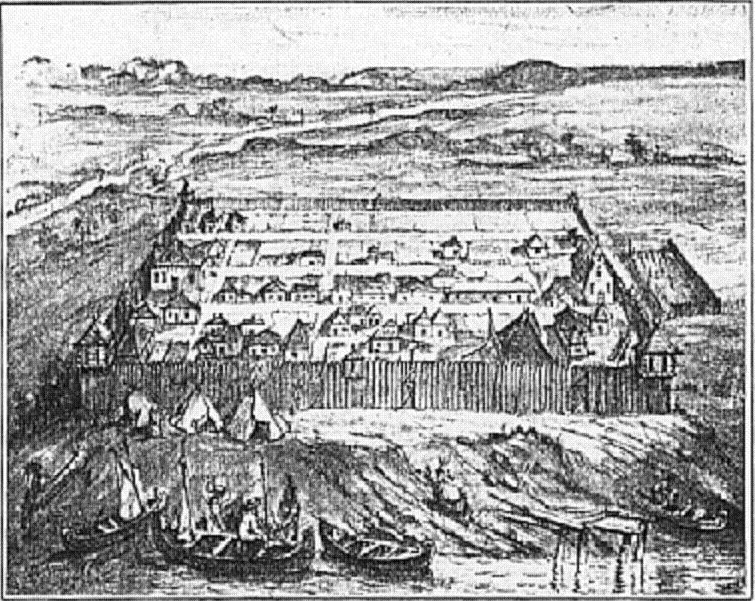
- Fort Pontchartrain du Détroit in 1710

Site information
- Type: Fort
- Controlled by: New France (1701–1760) (Kingdom of Great Britain) Great Britain (1760–1796)

Site history
- Built: 1701
- In use: 1701–1796

Fort Pontchartrain du Détroit or Fort Detroit (1701–1796) was a French and later British fortification established in 1701 on the north side of the Detroit River by Antoine Laumet de Lamothe Cadillac. A settlement based on the fur trade, farming and missionary work slowly developed in the area. The fort was located in what is now downtown Detroit, northeast of the intersection of Washington Boulevard and West Jefferson Avenue.

Fort Pontchartrain du Détroit was attacked by the Meskwaki during the Fox Wars, and was the target of an aborted attack by English-aligned Wyandot during King George's War. During the French and Indian War, Fort Pontchartrain du Détroit surrendered to the British on November 29, 1760 after the capture of Montreal. It was besieged by Indigenous forces during Pontiac's War in 1763. The British controlled the area throughout the American Revolutionary War, but replaced the French fort with the newly constructed Fort Lernoult in 1779. While the territory on what is now the Michigan side of the Detroit River was ceded to the United States in the Treaty of Paris in 1783, control of the fort was not transferred until 1796, after the Jay Treaty.

== History ==
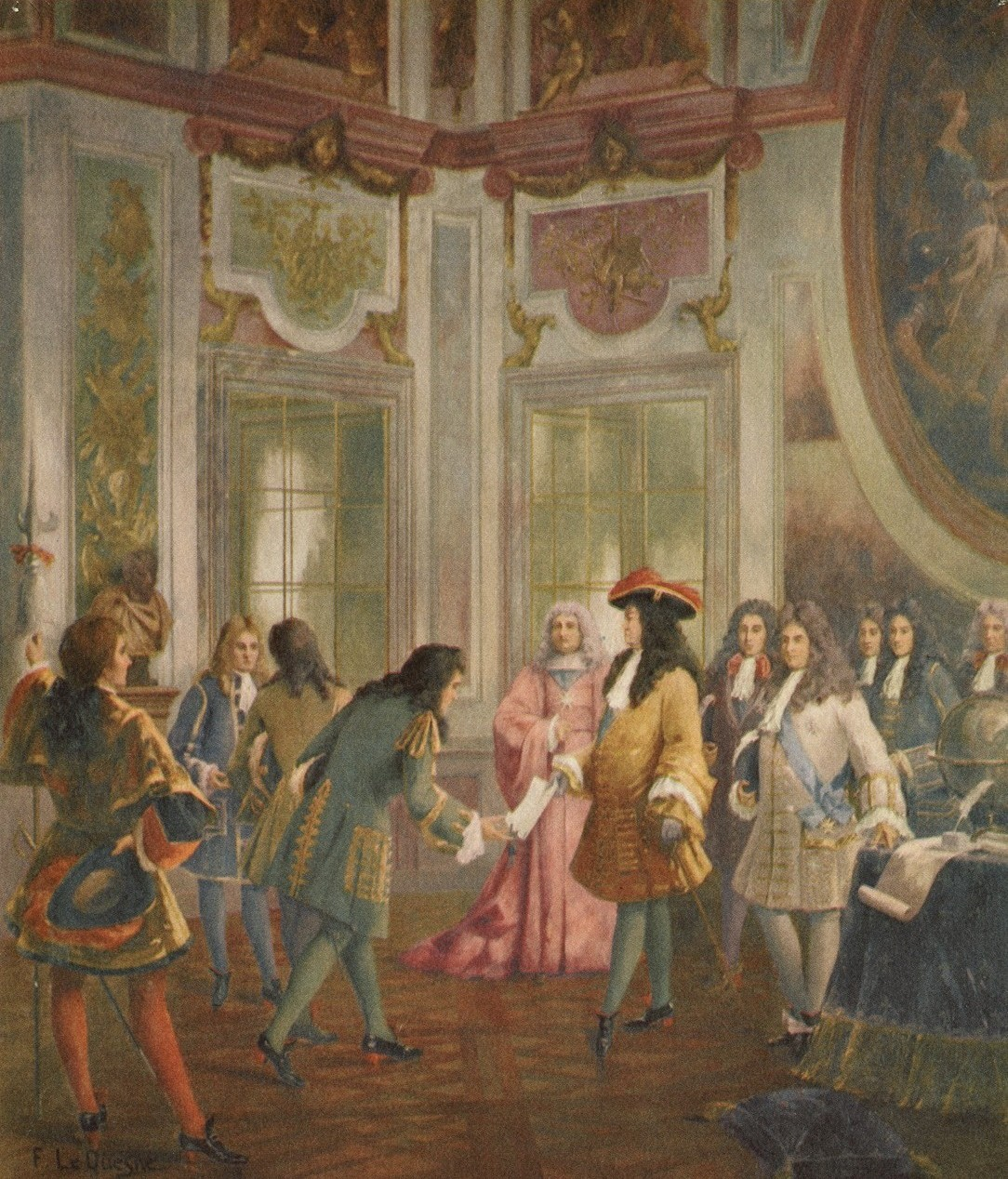
Painting depicting Cadillac receiving letters patent from representatives of King Louis XIV of France by Fernand Le Quesne.

The river flowing between Lake St. Clair and Lake Erie was called by Le Détroit du Lac Érié by the French, meaning "The Strait of Lake Erie." In 1698, Antoine Laumet de Lamothe Cadillac, who had previously commanded Fort de Buade at Michilimackinac, proposed the establishment of a colony at Detroit. French families would be recruited as settlers, and the Indigenous tribes living near Michilimackinac would be encouraged to migrate to the area. The settlement would not only prevent English expansion into the Pays d'en Haut (Upper Country), but would also deter Iroquois aggression. Jérôme Phélypeaux de Pontchartrain, the French Secretary of State of the Navy, approved the plan despite the misgivings of New France's Governor and Intendant.

In June 1701, Cadillac set out from Lachine near Montreal with 100 settlers and soldiers. The expedition followed a northerly route up the Ottawa River and across to Georgian Bay and Lake Huron. The expedition reached Grosse Ile on the Detroit River on July 23. The following day, the expedition returned upstream several miles to a bluff on the north shore of the river at its narrowest point. Cadillac commenced the construction of a fort at this location which he named Fort Pontchartrain du Détroit. The first building completed was a chapel dedicated to Saint Anne, the patron saint of New France. In September, the first two European women arrived at the fort: Cadillac's wife, Marie-Thérèse Guyon, and Marie Anne Picoté de Belestre, the wife of Cadillac's lieutenant, Alphonse de Tonty.

Fort Pontchartrain du Détroit was built from white oak and initially enclosed an area of about 0.85 acres (0.34 hectares). The palisade was roughly 12 feet (3.7 m) tall with a bastion positioned at each corner. Dwellings, a warehouse, and the chapel were constructed inside the fort. For many years the entire European population lived within the palisade. In October 1703, a fire destroyed the chapel and the house of the Recollect priest, Constantin Delhalle, as well as the residences of Cadillac and Tonty.

After the fort was established, Odawa (Ottawa) from Michilimackinac, and Wyandot (Huron) from Michilimackinac and the St. Joseph River migrated to Detroit and established palisaded villages. Groups of Miami, Ojibwe and later Potawatomi also migrated to the area. In 1705, Cadillac reported an Indigenous population at Detroit of 2,000.

=== Conflict among Indigenous tribes ===
In June 1706, while Cadillac was at Quebec, Odawa warriors at Detroit organized an expedition against the Sioux. As they were setting out, a Potowatomi who had married a Miami woman mistakenly warned the Odawa that the Miami were planning to raid their village during their absence. The Odawa chief known as Le Pesant or "The Bear" decided to turn back and lead a preemptive strike. They surprised eight Miami near the fort and slew seven of them. Étienne de Veniard, Sieur de Bourgmont, who was commanding Fort Pontchartrain in Cadillac's absence, provided sanctuary to the Miami and ordered his men to open fire on the Odawa. Father Delhalle and a soldier were caught outside the fort and were killed. In the series of raids, ambushes, and counter-attacks that followed, the Miami were joined by the Wyandot. About 30 Odawa, 50 Miami and an unknown number of Wyandot were killed. The Odawa abandoned their village and moved back to Michilimackinac but returned by 1708.

Contemporary accounts, both Indigenous and French, do not agree on the cause of the attack or who was to blame. Bourgmont was criticized for his handling of the incident and deserted after Cadillac's return. For the next several years, he lived as a coureur des bois before undertaking an exploration of the Missouri River in 1714. The Governor General of New France, Philippe de Rigaud, Marquis de Vaudreuil concluded that Le Pesant was responsible. Vaunreuil insisted that Le Pesant be turned over to the French, and gave Cadillac the authority to arrest and execute him. Le Pesant was apprehended at Michilimackinac and brought to Detroit but was allowed to escape. Angry that Le Pesant had not been executed, the Miami and Wyandot murdered three settlers in the vicinity of the fort. Cadillac later led a lackluster attack against the Miami settled on the St. Joseph River.

The Wyandot leader Cheanonvouzon may have orchestrated the conflict by spreading false rumours and encouraging Miami aggression. Cheanonvouzon, known as Quarante Sols by the French and Michipichy by the Odawa, was the leader of a band that had split from the Wyandot at Michilimackinac about 1690 and had lived among the Miami before rejoining the Michilimackinac band at Detroit. Cheanonvouzon sought to reclaim Wyandot autonomy from the more numerous Odawa. To this end he established a trade alliance with the Miami and Iroquois. The alliance with the Iroquois gave the Wyandot access to goods like Caribbean rum and scarlet woollens which could be acquired from the British at Albany but not from the French.

In 1707 Cadillac began granting land in the vicinity of the fort to French settlers. He required that they pay an exorbitant annual rent and a percentage of their crops to him. In response to complaints about Cadillac, Pontchartrain appointed François Clariambault d'Aigremont to investigate conditions at Detroit and other posts. In his November 1708 report, d'Aigremont accused Cadillac of profiteering and enacting policies that threatened French control of the Pays d'en Haut. He noted that in contrast to Cadillac's glowing reports, there were only 62 French settlers at Detroit and 353 acres under cultivation. He described Cadillac's rule as "tyrannical," and added that Cadillac had earned the hatred of both the French settlers and their Indigenous neighbours. D'Aigremont further noted that most of the furs passing through Detroit were going to the English at Albany, either directly or through Iroquois middlemen. As a result of d'Aigremont's findings, Pontchartrain decided to replace Cadillac by appointing him governor of Louisiana. Cadillac would later describe Louisiana as a "wretched place" whose inhabitants were "gallow-birds with no respect for religion and addicted to vice."

=== Fox Wars ===
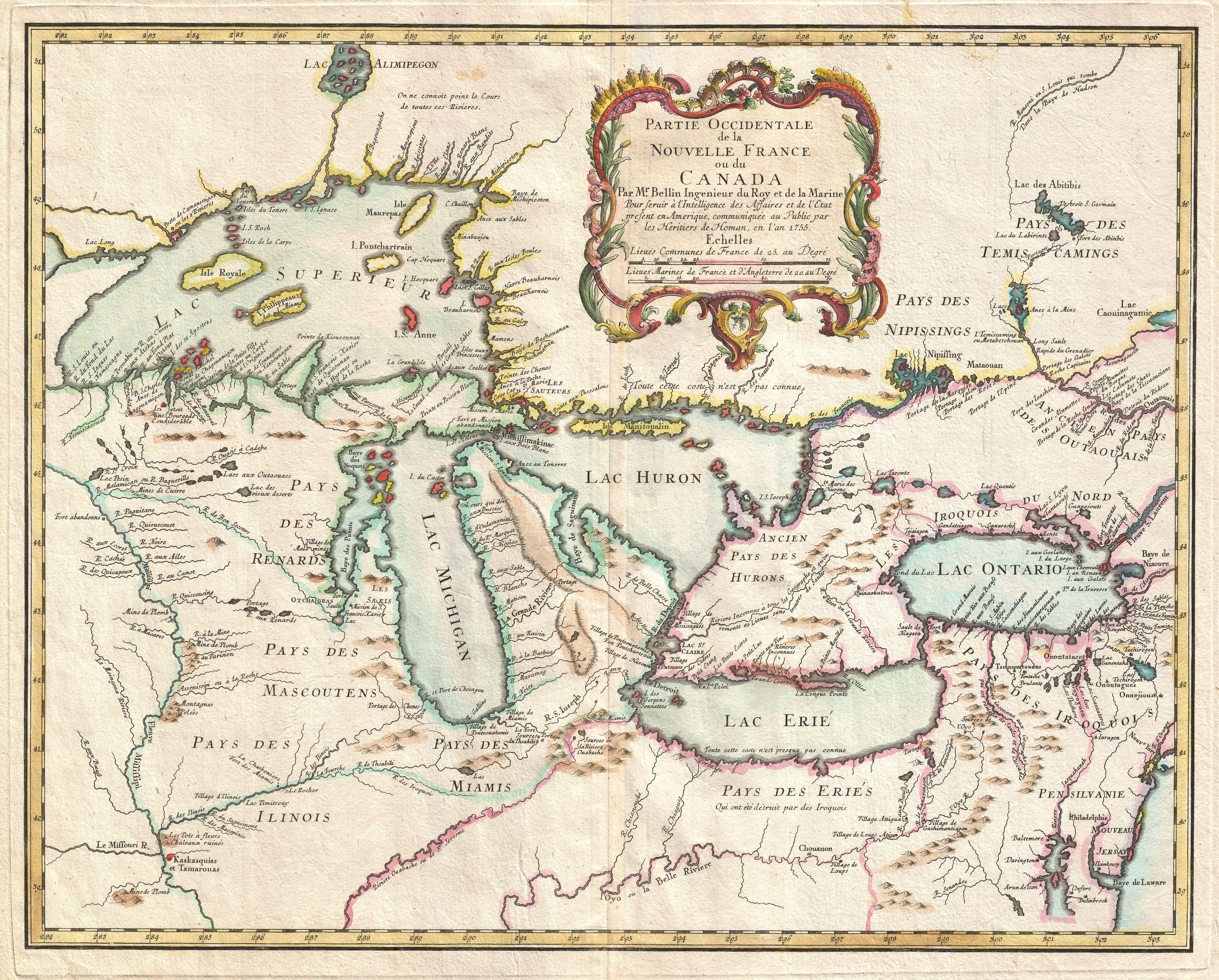
Jacques Nicolas Bellin's 1755 Map of the Great Lakes

Before he was replaced as commander of Fort Pontchartrain, Cadillac naively invited the Meskwaki (Fox), Kickapoo, and Mascouten living to the west of Lake Michigan to relocate to Detroit. The Meskwaki had long been enemies of the Ojibwe, as well as the Odawa, Potawatomi and the Illinois Confederation.

In 1710, two bands of Meskwaki along with some Kickapoo and Mascouten moved to the headwaters of the Grand and St. Joseph rivers. One group of Meskwaki established an encampment near Fort Pontchartrain later that year. Cadillac's successor, Jacques-Charles Renaud Dubuisson, was opposed to having Indigenous tribes settle at Detroit, and considered the Meskwaki and their allies to be troublemakers. The Meskwaki stole livestock, taunted the Odawa and Wyandot, claimed they were the rightful masters of Detroit, and openly boasted about their plans to trade with the English. This band abruptly abandoned Detroit early in the spring of 1712 and took refuge among the Seneca.

In April 1712, the Odawa war chief Saguima led Odawa and Potawatomi warriors in a surprise attack against the Mascouten living at the headwaters of the St. Joseph River. Over 150 of the Mascouten were killed including women and children. Saguima had initially planned to attack the Meskwaki living there, however, that band had moved to Detroit shortly before the attack. The Mascouten survivors took refuge with the Meskwaki who proceeded to build a fortified camp close to Fort Pontchartrain. In retaliation for the attack on the Mascouten, the Meskwaki raided the Odawa village at Detroit, captured three women including Saguima's wife, then invested Fort Pontchartrain. Dubuisson, however, was able to get word to Saguima and to the Wyandot who were at their hunting camps on Saginaw Bay.

On May 13, Jean-Baptiste Bissot, Sieur de Vincennes accompanied by seven French traders arrived from Fort St. Joseph and were able to reach the safety of Fort Pontchartrain. Soon the Wyandot returned from their hunting camp, followed by Saguima with 600 Odawa and Potawatomis. The Meskwaki withdrew into their fort which was then besieged by the Odawa, Potawatomis, Wyandot, and French. Following a parley, the three Odawa women were released, however, the siege continued as France's Indigenous allies were unwilling to negotiate with the Meskwaki. The Meskwaki war chief Pemoussa later offered his own life and a gift of seven young women as slaves if his people were allowed to leave but his offer was refused.

The Meskwaki escaped in late May during a series of severe thunderstorms. Indigenous and French forces led by Saguima and Vincennes tracked the escapees and entrapped them at Grosse Pointe near the outlet of Lake St. Clair. After four days of fighting Pemoussa proposed to surrender both himself and his warriors if the French would spare their families. Vincennes agreed, however, once the Meskwaki warriors had laid down their arms they were massacred. Pemoussa was taken prisoner but later escaped. The women and children were enslaved, and some were later sold or gifted to the French. The Wyandot, however, elected to torture and burn all of their captives rather than keep them as slaves.

In response, the Meskwaki still living west of Lake Michigan and those who had joined the Seneca began raiding in the vicinity of Detroit. Operating in small groups, they attacked and killed anyone who strayed too far from Fort Pontchartrain or the palisaded Indigenous villages. In 1713, the Wyandot intercepted a large Meskwaki war party on the Ile aux Dindes, a small island in the Detroit River about six miles downstream of Fort Pontchartrain. Raids continued in 1714 and 1715. In 1716, a French-led expedition from Montreal attacked the main Meskwaki village on the Fox River. After a four-day siege, the Meskwaki sued for peace. They provided hostages, agreed to return captives, and ceased their attacks against France's Indigenous allies.

Although conflict erupted between the Meskwaki and Illinois in 1719, the fighting had little impact on Detroit. In 1723, however, the Ojibwe sent out war parties against the Meskwaki, disrupting the flow of furs to Detroit and Michilimackinac. In 1728, the Governor General of New France, Charles de Beauharnois concluded that a genocidal campaign against the Meskwaki was warranted. 400 French soldiers and coureurs des bois led by François-Marie Le Marchand de Lignery were joined at Michilimackinac by Odawa, Ojibwe, Potawatomi, and Wyandot from Detroit. The forewarned Meskwaki abandoned their villages and retreated west. Lignery burned the villages and destroyed the crops in the fields but returned to Michilimackinac without engaging the Mewkwaki in battle.

In 1729, the Mascouten and Kickapoo ended their long-standing alliance with the Meskwaki. The following year most of the Meskwaki began a long journey east to seek sanctuary with the Seneca. That summer they were discovered by the Cahokia while encamped on the Illinois River. The Meskwaki fled south and east across the tallgrass prairie located to the south of Lake Michigan but were constantly harassed by the Cahokia. The Meskwaki took refuge in a grove of trees and constructed a rough fortification. Warriors from the Potowatomi, Kickapoo, and Mascouten joined the Cahokia to besiege the Meskwaki encampment. French soldiers under the command of Nicolas Antoine Coulon de Villiers and traders from Fort de Chartres and Fort St. Joseph joined the siege as did warriors from the Sauk and Miami. Efforts to negotiate were rebuked and while the Sauk provided sanctuary for some of the children, almost all of the Meskwaki were killed or enslaved when they attempted a breakout.

In December 1731, a war-party of Wyandot from Detroit and Christian Iroquois from Lake of Two Mountains near Montreal attacked the remnant population of Meskwaki living on the Wisconsin River. 150 were slaughtered and 154 were taken captive. 56 of the captives were killed during the arduous return to Detroit, and most of the remainder were executed after their arrival. The survivors repulsed a second Wyandot attack the following year, after which the Sauk provided sanctuary at Green Bay. In 1633, Villiers, two of his sons, and several other Frenchmen were killed when they tried to intimidate the Sauk into turning over the Meskwaki. The Sauk and the Meskwaki fled west across the Mississippi River and established a fortified village on the Wapsipicon River. News of a large French expedition led by Nicolas-Joseph des Noyelles caused the Sauk and Meskwaki to move even further west to the Des Moines River. The French expedition reached the Des Moines in March 1735, but withdrew after a brief skirmish due to a lack of food and unreliable Indigenous allies.

=== Mission of the Assumption ===
In the summer of 1728, the Jesuit Father Armand de La Richardie, came from Quebec to establish a mission at Detroit. He chose a site on the south shore of the river at La Pointe de Montréal, and it was given the imposing title of The Mission of Our Lady of the Assumption among the Hurons of Detroit. In 1742, the mission moved to Bois Blanc Island but returned to La Pointe de Montréal in 1748. The mission became the center of la Petite Côte (Little Coast). Located in what is now Windsor, La Petite Côte represents the oldest continuously occupied European settlement in Ontario. In 1765, the roughly sixty French families living on La Petite Côte petitioned for a parish of their own. It was decided that the mission would become the Parish of Our Lady of the Assumption with the care of the souls of both the Wendat and the French settlers.

=== Renewed conflict ===
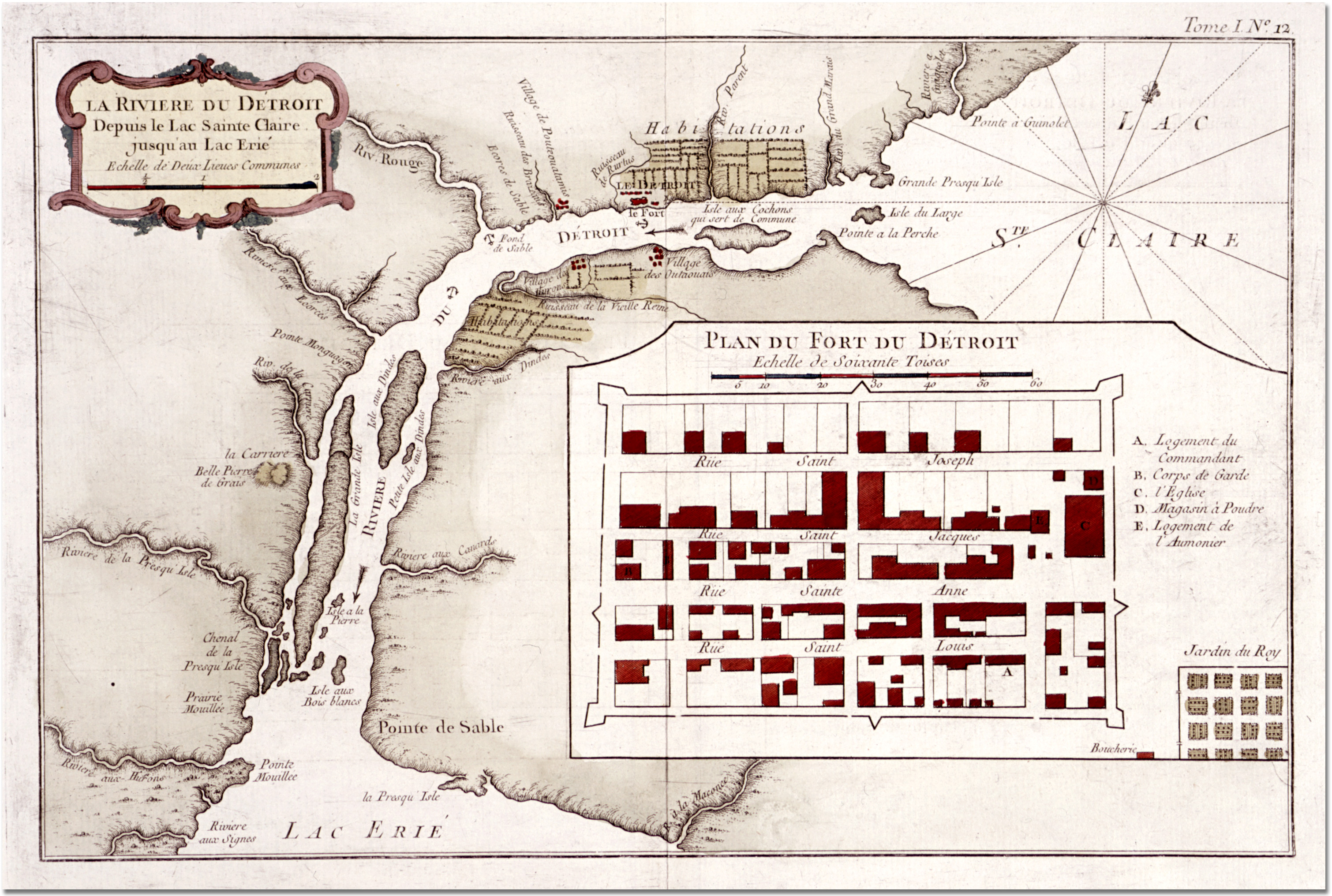
Map of Fort Pontchartrain du Detroit and vicinity c. 1752

During the Fox Wars, the animosity between the Wyandot and Odawa at Detroit abated, but tempers flared again in 1738 when the Wyandot announced that they would no longer participate in joint raids against the Catawba (Flatheads). After an Odawa raid was routed by the Catawba with Wyandot assistance, the Odawa harassed and threatened the Wyandot, prompting them to relocate to Sandusky Bay on Lake Erie. Upon returning to Detroit the following year, the Wyandot debated whether they should move to the St. Lawrence River valley, remain near Detroit, or settle permanently at Sandusky. While one group decided to establish a village on Bois Blanc Island at the mouth of the Detroit River, another group led by Angouirot and Nicholas Orontony returned to Sandusky and constructed a village south of the bay which became known as Junundat.

During King George's War, the Wyandot, Odawa, Ojibwe and Potawatomis at Detroit initially supported the French and sent warriors to Montreal, but withdrew their support when the war curtailed the supply of trade goods. Meanwhile, Orontony and the Junundat Wyandot supported the British. In 1747, they killed five French traders and plotted to massacre settlers at Detroit. They were thwarted when a "loyal" Wyandot woman overheard the planning and informed the Jesuit missionary Father Pierre-Philippe Potier at Bois Blanc Island. Potier hastened to Fort Pontchartrain and warned its commander about the threat. Fearing retribution, Orontony led his people south and established the village of Conchaké at the head of the Muskingum River. In the interim, the Detroit Wyandot abandoned Bois Blanc Island and relocated to La Pointe du Montreal directly across the river from Fort Pontchartrain.

Following the death of Orontony in 1750, a smallpox epidemic in 1752, and the attack by Charles Michel de Langlade on the nearby British-aligned Miami village of Pickawillany, the Muskingum River settlement was abandoned. A number of the Conchaké Wyandot returned to Detroit, however, most returned to Sandusky.

=== French and Indian War (1754–1763) ===
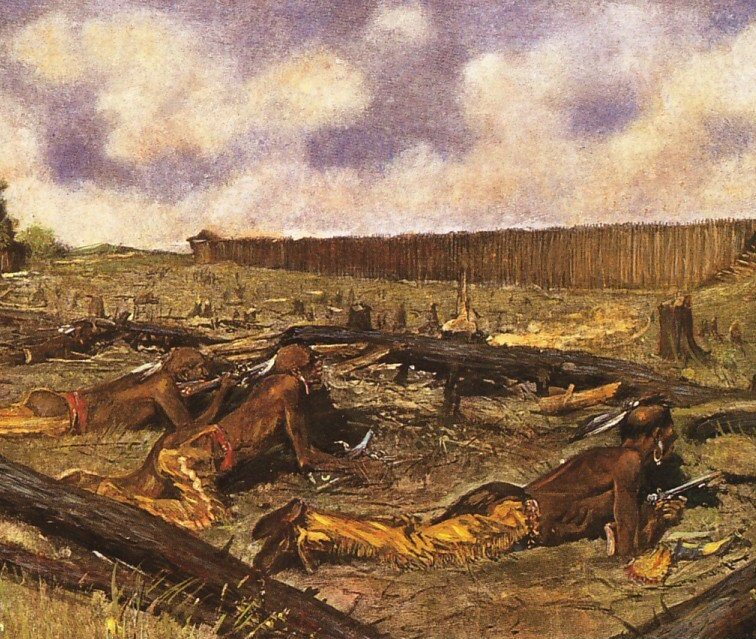
The 1763 Siege of the Fort at Detroit by Frederic Remington

During the French and Indian War, Ottawa, Potawatomi, and Wyandot warriors as well as a contingent of Canadian militia from Detroit participated in the defeat of Braddock's Expedition. In April 1754, the French had established Fort Duquesne at the confluence of the Allegheny and Monongahela rivers, and in July had forced George Washington to surrender Fort Necessity. The following year Major General Edward Braddock led a retaliatory expedition of 2,100 British regulars and provincials against Fort Duquesne. The French commander, Claude-Pierre Pécaudy de Contrecœur, sent most of his garrison and roughly 650 Indigenous allies to attack the approaching British vanguard. In the subsequent Battle of the Monongahela, the British, unfamiliar with wilderness combat, had 457 killed in action while the French and their Indigenous allies suffered only 23 deaths.

In 1757, prior to the siege of Fort William Henry, a British reconnaissance in force of 350 men was ambushed at Sabbath Day Point on Lake George by 50 Canadian militia and 450 Odawa, Ojibwe and Potawatomi including warriors from Detroit. About 100 members of the provincial 1st New Jersey Regiment (Jersey Blues) were killed or drowned while 150 were taken prisoner.

In September 1758, during the Forbes Expedition, a British reconnaissance force of 800 led by Major James Grant attempted to capture Fort Duquesne but was overwhelmed by the French, Odawa and Wyandot defenders. A third of the British force was killed, wounded or captured including Grant. Afterwards, most of the Wyandot and Odawa returned to Detroit with their captives and trophies, significantly weakening Fort Duquesne's defences. The French garrison destroyed the fort and withdrew from the area before the main body of the expedition arrived in November.

The disruption to the flow of trade goods that followed the 1758 Siege of Louisbourg and the capture of Fort Frontenac on Lake Ontario that same year effectively ended the participation of Detroit's Indigenous population in the war. On November 29, 1760, a few months after the capture of Montreal, Fort Pontchartrain du Détroit surrendered peacefully to a British contingent led by Major Robert Rogers and officially became known as Fort Detroit.

=== Pontiac's war ===
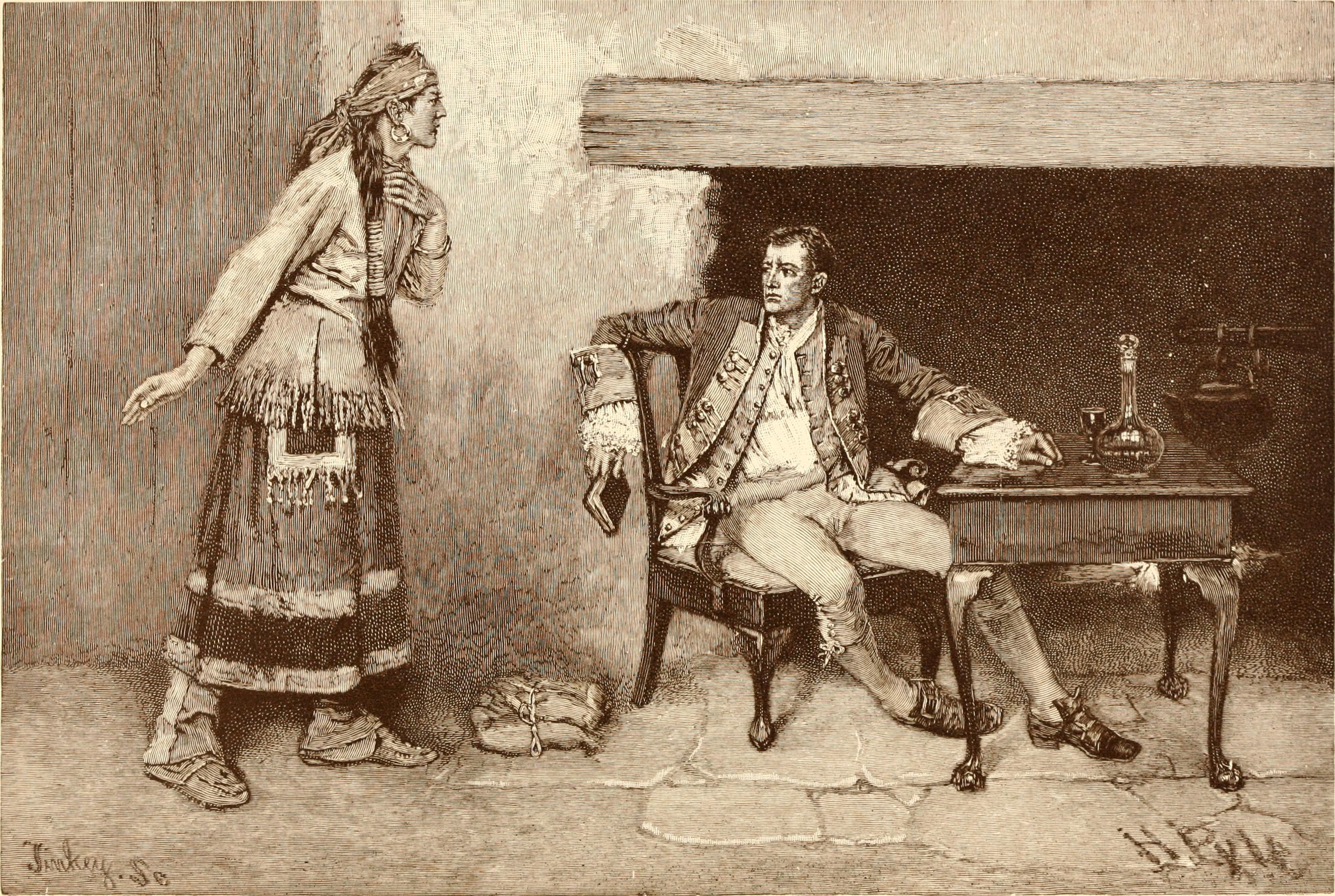
An Indigenous woman warns Major Gladwin about the impending attack on Fort Detroit.

The newly appointed governor of the Province of Quebec, Jeffrey Amherst, introduced a number of measures that strained the relationship between the British and the Indigenous population of the Great Lakes region. Amherst believed that although trade was necessary and desirable, the lavish giving of gifts was not. The governor failed to understand that Indigenous leaders considered gift-giving a key part of diplomacy. Amherst ended the common practice of traders visiting Indigenous villages and ordered trading restricted to the forts. Providing rum or other liquor to Indigenous people was forbidden. Finally, he limited the amount of powder and lead that traders could provide, which severely impacted the ability of the Indigenous population to hunt.

In response, Pontiac, war leader of the Odawa, organized a loose confederation of tribes in an attempt to drive British soldiers and settlers from the region. On May 7, 1763, Pontiac and 60 Odawa entered the fort with weapons concealed under blankets. Pontiac intended to surprise the garrison, however, the British commander, Major Henry Gladwin, had been forewarned and his men were armed and ready. Pontiac withdrew but two days later initiated a siege. During the first week of the siege, 20 soldiers and 15 British civilians outside the fort were captured, killed or wounded, however, no French settlers were harmed.

As the siege progressed, Pontiac's force of roughly 460 Odawa, Potawatomi, and Wyandot grew to more than 800 with the addition of warriors from the Ojibwe and other tribes.

On July 29, 260 British reinforcements arrived under the command of Captain James Dalyell. The following day, Dalyell attempted an attack on Pontiac's encampment 2 miles (3.2 km) north of the fort. Pontiac ambushed the British force at the Battle of Bloody Run, costing the British 23 dead and 34 wounded.

Despite their losses, the British continued to resist. In October, Pontiac offered a truce which Gladwin accepted. The need to start the winter hunt had caused the number of warriors to dwindle, while the British had been able to bring in provisions aboard the 6-gun schooner Huron and the 10-gun sloop Michigan. Pontiac lifted the siege on October 15 and withdrew south to the Maumee River.

=== Revolutionary War ===
During the Revolutionary War, Detroit served as a staging area for attacks on frontier settlements by British regulars, Butler's Rangers and Britain's Indigenous allies. Several American expeditions against Detroit were proposed or planned but were never fully executed.

At the beginning of the war, Detroit had a population of roughly 1,500 including 90 black and Indigenous slaves. About 225 individuals lived inside the fort while the remainder lived on farms that stretched along both sides of the river. The British garrison consisted of three companies of the 8th (The King's) Regiment of Foot and a small artillery detachment.

Roughly 4,000 Wyandot, Odawa, Potawatomi, and Ojibwe lived in the Detroit area. They were referred to as the "Lakes' Nations" by the British and could field close to 1,200 warriors. At a council held at Detroit in 1775, the Lakes' Nations indicated their support of the British, as did the local French-speaking inhabitants.

In 1775, Henry Hamilton was appointed as Lieutenant Governor of Detroit. He quickly established a solid working relationship with the fort commander, Captain Richard Lernoult, and with Jesu Hay, the senior British Indian Department officer. Six militia companies totally 575 men were recruited with Hay appointed as their commanding officer. Many of these militiamen would see active service during the war.

Until the summer of 1777, British policy was for their Indigenous allies to be ready to support the Crown but remain inactive. That spring, however, Hamilton received orders to deploy Indigenous warriors on diversionary attacks in support of the Burgoyne expedition. At a June 1777 council attended by the Lakes' Nations and the Mingo, Shawnee and Wyandot from the Ohio Country, Hamilton urged them to "take up the war hatchet" and strike at the rebels but to refrain from committing atrocities. 40 volunteers were recruited from the militia to accompany the warriors.

In early July, six war parties totalling 117 Odawa, Ojibwe & Potawotomi and 18 volunteers left Detroit to attack frontier settlements in what is now Kentucky and West Virginia. An additional 47 Lakes' warriors headed to Fort Niagara in support of the St. Leger Expedition. This group fought at the Battle of Oriskany in early August. Over the next few months, 28 war parties set out from Detroit.

The following spring, during a council at Detroit, Hamilton once again urged Britain's Indigenous allies to "not redden the axe... with the blood of women or children or innocent men."

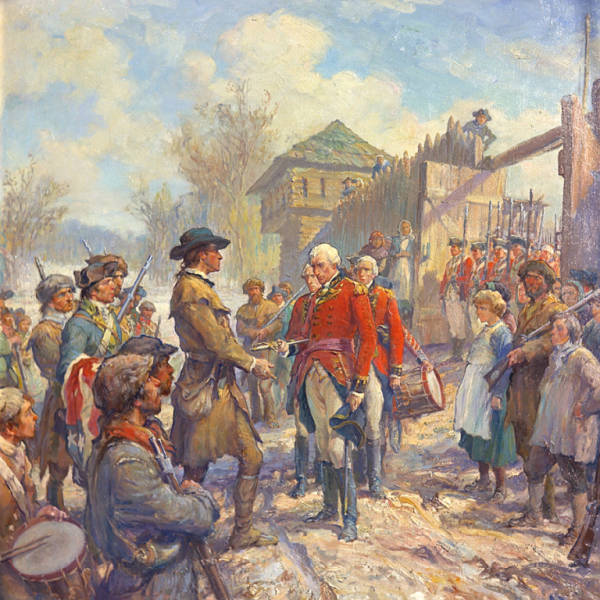
Henry Hamilton surrenders Fort Sackville to George Rogers Clark. Illustration by Frederick Coffay Yohn.

In January 1778, Lieutenant Colonel George Rogers Clark of the Kentucky militia was authorized to lead an expedition to seize the British outposts of Kaskaskia and Cahokia on the Mississippi River. Despite having recruited only 175 men, Clark captured Kaskaskia on July 4 and Cahokia two days later. Vincennes, on the Wabash River 180 miles east of Kaskakia was occupied by the end of the month. In response, Hamilton set out from Detroit on October 7 with 125 militia and 60 Lakes' Nation warriors. They were later joined by a 34-man detachment from the 8th Regiment. Hamilton surprised Fort Sackville's small garrison and retook Vincennes on December 17. He decided to winter at Vincennes with the British regulars, while most of the militia, volunteers, and Lakes' Nations warriors returned to Detroit.

In February 1779, after a gruelling march from Kaskaskia, Clark surprised Vincennes, and after summarily executing four Odawa captives, forced Hamilton's unconditional surrender. Hamilton was taken to Williamsburg, Virginia, falsely accused of paying for scalps, and was treated as a criminal rather than a prisoner of war. The Virginia Council, headed by Thomas Jefferson, ordered Hamilton placed in irons and confined to the Williamsburg jail. These harsh measures were relaxed several weeks later due to the intervention of George Washington. Hamilton accepted parole to New York in October 1780 and was officially exchanged in the spring of 1781.

In Hamilton's absence, Lernoult took steps to strengthen Detroit's defences. He began construction of a substantial redoubt on the high ground overlooking the stockaded town. Assisted by many of the inhabitants, the soldiers of the garrison dug ditches and erected an earthwork fortification of four half-bastions surmounted by a palisade. Work was completed in April 1779 and the fortification was given the name Fort Lernoult. Later in the war, a palisade was constructed that enclosed the area between the fort and the town.

In May 1778, Brigadier General Lachlan McIntosh was given command of the Western Department of the Continental Army. He was authorized by Congress to launch an expedition against Detroit, however, was only assigned two Continental regiments, roughly 250 men. McIntosh departed Fort Pitt on October 23, established Fort McIntosh at the confluence of the Ohio and Beaver rivers, and began construction of Fort Laurens on the Tuscarawas River in mid-November. Due to a shortage of provisions, McIntosh decided to return to Fort Pitt leaving the 11th Virginia Regiment to garrison the fort. That winter the garrison suffered greatly from a lack of food and warm clothing.

Lernoult dispatched Captain Henry Bird of the 8th Regiment and a small number of regulars to attack Fort Laurens. Bird recruited a few hundred Wyandot and Mingo warriors from the Sandusky area and began a siege on February 22, 1779. Due to the harsh winter conditions, Bird lifted the siege a month later and withdrew back to Detroit, shortly before American reinforcements arrived. Daniel Brodhead who had replaced McIntosh as commander of the Western Department, decided that Fort Lauren's location was untenable and ordered the fort abandoned. Brodhead proposed an attack on Detroit for later that year, however, abandoned his plan in favour of an expedition up the Allegheny River in support of the Sullivan expedition.

In response to news of Hamilton's capture, and in anticipation of an American campaign against Detroit, a company of Butler's Rangers and a detachment of the 47th Regiment of Foot was sent to augment the garrison. On 1 November 1779, Major Arent DePeyster, who had previously commanded at Michilimackinac, succeeded Captain Lernolt as Fort Detroit's commander.

In May 1780, DePeyster ordered an expedition against American forces at the Falls of the Ohio (Louisville). He choose Captain Bird to lead the force of 150 soldiers from the 8th Regiment, 47th Regiment, Royal Artillery, and Detroit militia, accompanied by 100 Lakes' Nations warriors. At the confluence of the Ohio and Great Miami rivers, Bird rendezvoused with Alexander McKee of the British Indian Department who had recruited several hundred warriors from the Ohio Country. Although Bird's orders were to proceed to the Falls of the Ohio, he was overruled by his Indigenous allies who preferred to attack the isolated settlements on the Licking River. In late June, Bird's expedition destroyed the fortified settlements of Ruddle's Fort and Martin's Station. A number of non-combatants were killed or wounded at Ruddle's Fort when the Indigenous warriors ignored the terms of surrender and took most of the inhabitants captive. Bird reported to DePeyster that the Indigenous auxiliaries "rush'd in, tore the poor children from their mothers Breasts, killed a wounded man and every one of the cattle." Bird was able to prevent a repeat when Martin's Station surrendered, however, both forts were plundered and burned. Afterwards, Bird's regulars and militia escorted about 150 men, women and children to Detroit, arriving there in early August. Of the 200–250 prisoners taken by the Indigenous auxiliaries, most were brought to Detroit, but a number were killed en route in what historian Russell Mahan has called a death march. A few others, mostly young women and children, were held captive until the end of the war and in some cases for years afterwards.

Late in 1780, George Rogers Clark began to plan an expedition against Detroit for the summer of 1781. Supported by Thomas Jefferson, Clark hoped to raise 2,000 volunteers from western Virginia and Pennsylvania, however, most of the militia in Virginia were unwilling to participate in a lengthy expedition due to the threat of raids against their homes. At Fort Pitt, Brodhead refused to commit any Continental soldiers as he was in the process of staging a campaign against the Lenape (Delaware). Few Pennsylvanians were willing to participate in an expedition headed by a Virginian due to lingering resentment over a recently settled border dispute. An exception was Colonel Archibald Lochry, commander of the Westmoreland militia who raised 107 volunteers for the campaign.

When DePeyster became aware of Clark's planned expedition, he dispatched Andrew Thompson's company of Butler's Rangers to the Wyandot town of Upper Sandusky, while Indian Department officials began to gather Indigenous auxiliaries. In mid-August, Mohawk war leader Joseph Brant, who had been sent to Detroit, led about 90 Iroquois, Shawnee, and Wyandot warriors to the confluence of the Great Miami and Ohio rivers.

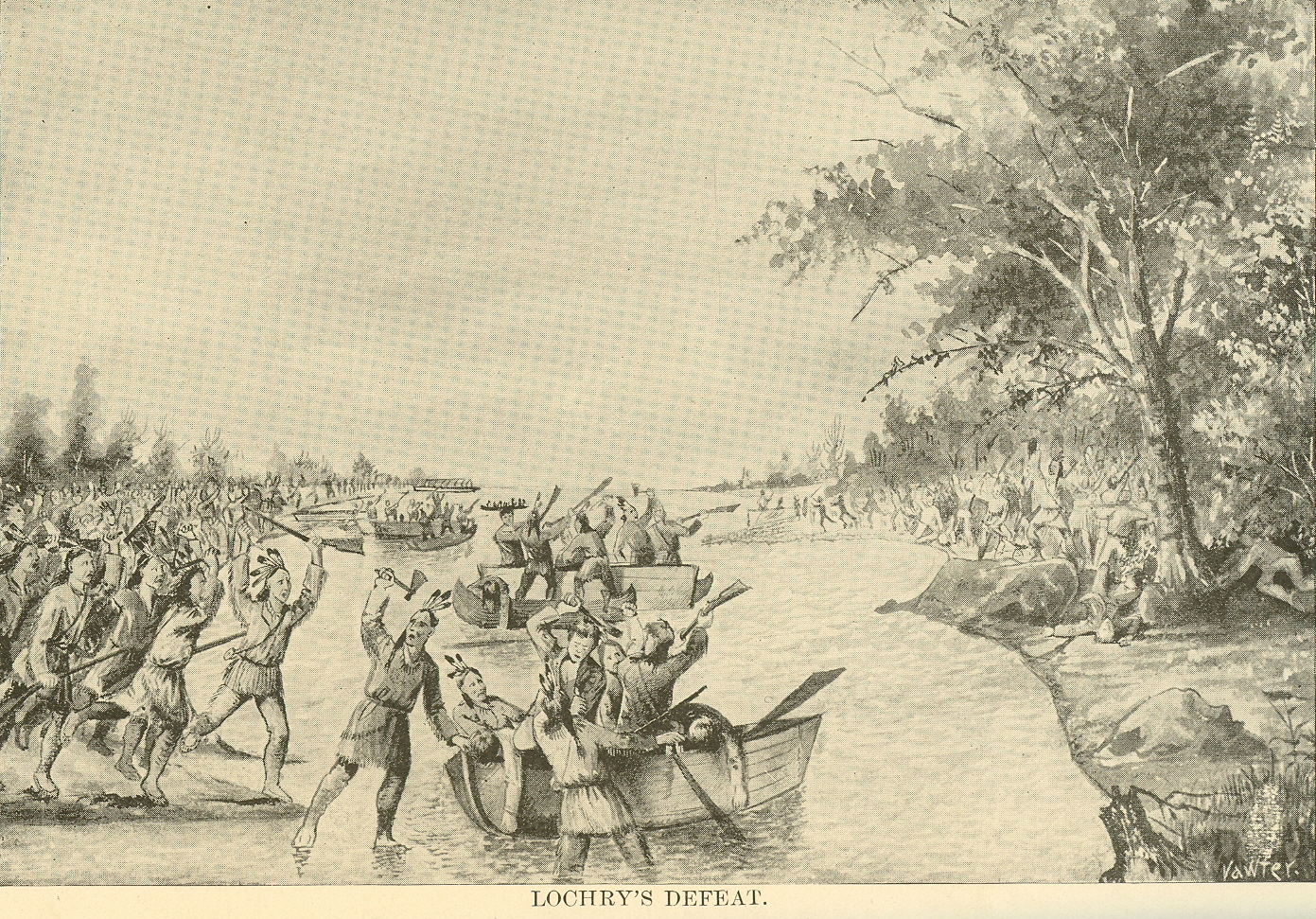
Joseph Brant ambushes Archibald Lochry and his volunteers on the Ohio River.

In early August, Clark set out by boat down the Ohio River from Wheeling intending for Lochry to rendezvous with him en route. Brant realized that he had insufficient men to attack Clark as the expedition floated past, however, learned that Lochry was not far behind. On August 24, Lochry landed his party on the north bank of the Ohio and was ambushed. 37 Americans were killed including Lochry and 64 were captured. On August 27, Brant rendezvoused with Thompson and Alexander McKee who had brought with him several hundred warriors. Brant, Thompson and McKee set off in pursuit of Clark, however, the combined force dispersed in early September upon learning that Clark had called off his campaign.

In the spring of 1782, Colonel William Crawford, a former Continental Army officer, led about 500 volunteers in a campaign against the Indigenous villages along the Sandusky River. On June 4, as the expedition approached the Wyandot village of Upper Sandusky, they were met by a mixed force of Wyandot, Lenape (Delaware), Lakes' Indians, and William Caldwell's company of Butler's Rangers from Detroit. After a day of indecisive fighting the Americans regrouped in a grove of trees that came to be known as Battle Island. A large contingent of Shawnee warriors arrived the next day, Fearing encirclement, the Americans retreated in disorder. Crawford and an unknown number of his volunteers were captured and later tortured to death by the Lenape in retaliation for the Gnadenhutten massacre.

In August, Caldwell, who had been wounded at Sandusky, led his company and roughly 300 Indigenous auxiliaries across the Ohio River and briefly besieged Bryan Station. Caldwell retreated as American reinforcements approached but successfully ambushed the pursuing militia at the Battle of Blue Licks. In September 1782, in one of last military actions of the war, Captain Andrew Bradt's company of Butler's Rangers and roughly 250 Indigenous warriors unsuccessfully besieged Fort Henry in what is now Wheeling, West Virginia.

=== Northwest Indian War ===
News of the peace treaty between Britain and the United States arrived in Detroit on May 6, 1783. DePeyster, who had recently been promoted to Lieutenant Colonel, notified the various Indigenous tribes that Fort Detroit had supported, and began attempts to ransom captives still held by them. 492 American prisoners held by the British at Detroit were sent to Montreal to be repatriated. Although the peace treaty placed Detroit in the territory ceded to the United States, DePeyster received no orders to evacuate the fort. When American Indian commissioners visited Detroit in July 1783 they were treated politely, but no commitments were made to turn over the fort.

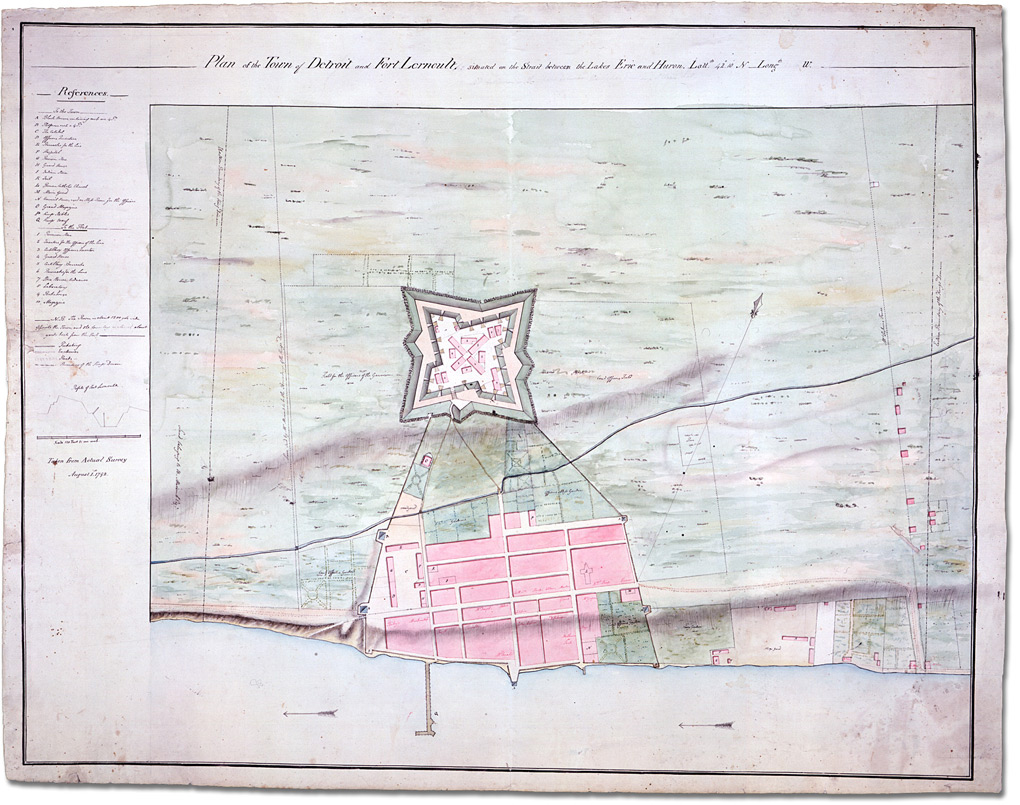
Plan of the Town of Detroit and Fort Lernoult

Britain held on to Detroit, Fort Niagara, Michilimackinac and a number of other outposts until 1796. The official reason was that the Americans had failed to comply with portions of the treaty. Debts incurred to British merchants prior to the war were not being paid, and the confiscation of Loyalist properties continued. Unofficially, Britain wanted to retain control of the lucrative fur trade.

During this period, the British maintained a strong military presence at Detroit, and continued policies that supported their Indigenous allies. During the Northwest Indian War, the British Indian Department supplied muskets, powder and lead to the Northwestern Confederacy that had formed in response to American encroachment on Indigenous territory north of the Ohio River. There is evidence that some Indian Department agents such as Simon Girty participated in engagements against American forces, while others served as advisors. Following their successes against Lieutenant Colonel Josiah Harmar in 1790 and Major-General Arthur St. Clair in 1791, the Northwestern Confederacy was decisively defeated by Major-General "Mad Anthony" Wayne at the Battle of Fallen Timbers in 1794. By the terms of the 1795 Treaty of Greenville, the Confederacy ceded most of the future state of Ohio and significant portions of what would become the states of Indiana, Illinois, and Michigan including the area encompassing Detroit.

On July 11, 1796, under terms negotiated in the Jay Treaty, the British relinquished Detroit to the Americans, 13 years after the Treaty of Paris had ended the war.

The remaining vestiges of Fort Porchartrain were destroyed in the Great Fire of 1805. Fort Lernoult and a warehouse on the river were the only structures in Detroit that survived the conflagration. Since St. Anne's Church was also destroyed, Father Richard used that single remaining warehouse for services and church gatherings for the next four years until the new church was built. The Americans referred to Fort Lernoult as Fort Detroit until after the War of 1812 when it was renamed Fort Shelby. By 1827 the fort was no longer needed and was demolished.

== Legacy ==
Hotel Pontchartrain, a 367-room 25-story hotel, was built in the early 1960s on the site of Fort Pontchartrain. The hotel was dedicated on July 24, 1965, the 264th anniversary of the founding of Detroit. After several ownership and branding changes, the hotel became Fort Pontchartrain a Wyndham Hotel in 2021.

An earlier Hotel Pontchartrain was located on Cadillac Square at Woodward Avenue and opened in 1907. Originally 10-stories, an additional five stories were added in 1909. Unable to compete with hotels of more modern design, the hotel was sold in 1919 and demolished in 1920.

A Michigan Historical Commission Marker for Fort Pontchartrain du Détroit was erected in 1967 and is located at the southwest corner of Washington Boulevard and Jefferson Avenue. Fort Lernoult is commemorated by a Michigan Historical Commission Marker located at the intersection of Shelby Street and West Fort Street.
