= Fort Sandusky =

Fort Sandusky refers to at least three separate military forts that were built by French and English forces at three different sites in the area of Sandusky Bay and the Sandusky River in northern Ohio. They were the French Fort Sandoske (built 1749-1750), the British Fort Sandusky (1761), and the American Fort Sandusky (1812, later renamed as Fort Stephenson).

In addition, there were both English and French colonial trading posts. The short-lived English trading post known as Fort Sandusky (1745-1748) was erected on the north side of the bay. Before 1754 French traders built a trading post on the south bank of Sandusky Bay and east of the Sandusky River, known as Fort Junandat. The latter was shown on an 1855 map of the Middle Colonies by Lewis Evans published in Philadelphia. In some French records the bay is called Lac Junandat because of this post. About this time the French also had a trading post at a Wyandot village on the Sandusky River several miles upriver from its mouth at the bay.

== Background ==
The Sandusky Bay area was a trading area where the French and English colonists competed for Native American trade. It was known to the French as Lac Sandoské or Otsandoské, as transliterated from Wyandot terms for "water" and "big water". There were a number of Wyandot, or Huron, villages in the area, where the Iroquoian-speaking Wyandot were predominant. Orontony, a Wyandot chief also called Nicolas by the French, had settled here in the 1740s, and emerged as a leader. Nicolas gave permission to English traders from Pennsylvania to build a trading post, which they called Fort Sandusky, on the northern shore of Sandusky Bay in 1745. It was near the carrying or portage place across the peninsula, between the bay and the Portage River at Lake Erie. This was the first such European post in Ohio Country.

The English were reportedly driven off by French soldiers from Fort Detroit in 1748-1749, as the French tried to control trade in this area.

== Fort Sandoské ==
The French replaced the blockhouse with a fort, called Fort Sandoské, at a site now within Ottawa County, Ohio. From about 1749 or 1750 to around 1753, Fort Sandoské (misleadingly referred to as "Fort Sandusky" in English and on Evans' map of 1755) was a French military fort on the northwest side of Sandusky Bay. It stood near the Bay, and somewhere southerly and easterly of the current City of Port Clinton, Ohio. This fort is known to have been abandoned by 1754.

By 1754, the French had also established Fort Junandat, a trading post on the south side of Sandusky Bay (which they called Lac Sandoské in some records). It was within present-day Erie County, Ohio.

With tensions rising as a result of the Seven Years' War in Europe, Gaspard-Joseph Chaussegros de Léry, a French lieutenant and engineer in Quebec, was dispatched from Presqu' Isle (Erie, Pennsylvania) to Fort Detroit in 1754 with regular reinforcements from Quebec. He knew of Fort Sandoské, referring to it in his campaign journal, which gave a detailed account of his activities and journey (this and seven others are held by Laval University in Quebec). By 1754 he noted that little remained of the Fort Sandoské but ruins. He took his forces on a portage from this area north across the peninsula to Lake Erie.

In his journal Chaussegros referred to seeing evidence of French traders and their families at Fort Junandat, diagonally to the southeast across the bay from the former site of Ft. Sandusky. He drew the plan of the former Fort Sandoské in his campaign journal for 1754. He described the post Fort Junandat as near what is known as Pickerel Creek, later within Townsend Township, Sandusky County. Because of erosion, the site of Fort Junandat disappeared into the bay.

Most fighting in the French and Indian War in North America ended by 1760 after the fall of Quebec to the British. The victorious British began to take possession of forts in the Ohio Country and Great Lakes region that were previously occupied by the French. The British 1758 Treaty of Easton with Ohio Country Indians promised that no additional forts would be built in their territory.

But in 1761 British General Jeffery Amherst ordered the erection of Fort Sandusky on Sandusky Bay in order to strengthen the line of defense from Fort Detroit, near the western end of Lake Erie, to central Lake Erie, and to Fort Pitt at the confluence of the Allegheny and Monongahela rivers, which controlled access to the Ohio River and the western frontier of the British colonies. The Seven Years' War continued in Europe until 1763 between Britain and France.

== British Fort Sandusky (1761-1763) ==
Fort Sandusky was a small British fort established on the southeastern shore of Sandusky Bay off Lake Erie in present-day Erie County. A European-American town later developed near there.

During Pontiac's Rebellion in 1763, when a regional coalition of American Indians, primarily Wyandot, tried to expel the British, they first attacked and then laid siege to Fort Detroit. The Wyandot and allies then attacked other forts in the region, taking control of Fort Sandusky. On May 16, 1763, a group of Wyandot gained entry to the fort under the pretense of holding a council with the British, the same stratagem that had failed in Detroit nine days earlier. Alone with the commander, chiefs seized him while warriors killed the fifteen-man garrison. They also killed a number of British traders and burned the fort, looting it first for stores.

== Summary ==
There has been considerable confusion about the forts of the same name in two different languages, with a great variety of spellings, especially as the name also referred to a trading post and not a military installation.

The sequence was the English trading post Fort Sandusky on the north side of the bay, replaced by the French Fort Sandoské, both in Ottawa County. The French trading post Fort Junandat was on the south side of the bay, as was the British Fort Sandusky with a 15-man garrison, built in 1761 after they defeated France in North America. Both were in present-day Erie County. The last Fort Sandusky was built about 1812 on the Lower Sandusky River southwest of the bay, and its name was later changed to Fort Stephenson. It was in Sandusky County, Ohio.

== See also ==
- List of Indian massacres
