= Our Lady of the Assumption (Windsor, Ontario) =

Coordinates: 42.3064°N 83.0695°W

Our Lady of the Assumption Windsor, Ontario
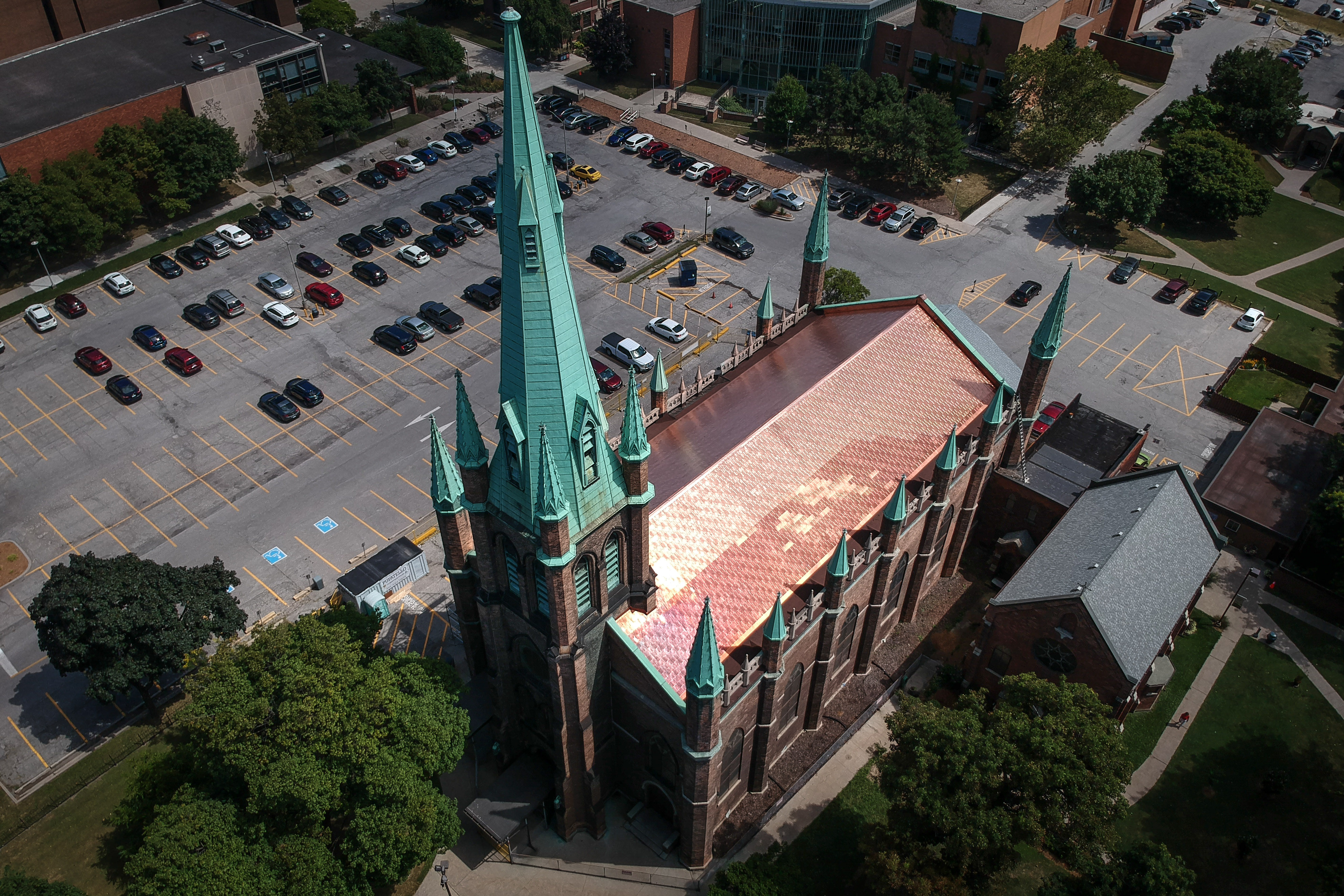
- Assumption Church new roof, August 2019
- Our Lady of the Assumption Windsor, Ontario
- Denomination: Roman Catholic
- Website: https://assumptionparish.ca/

History
- Dedication: Our Lady of the Assumption

Administration
- Province: Canada
- Diocese: Roman Catholic Diocese of London, Ontario
- Parish: Ontario

Our Lady of the Assumption, currently located at 350 Huron Church Road in Windsor, Ontario, is a Roman Catholic church and is the oldest continuous parish in Canada, west of Montreal.

The current church, which opened in 1845, is the fourth to be built on the site. The building closed in 2014 when it was determined the building needed approximately C$15 million in restoration work.

After a fundraising campaign, construction began in early 2019 on the first phase of a four phase restoration plan and included the installation of a long-term copper roof, a new heating system, major electrical work, and structural repairs.

The building reopened for regular weekend mass on September 8, 2019.

The parish began the second phase of the restoration plan in 2020. The second phase includes restoration of the church's ceiling.

== History ==
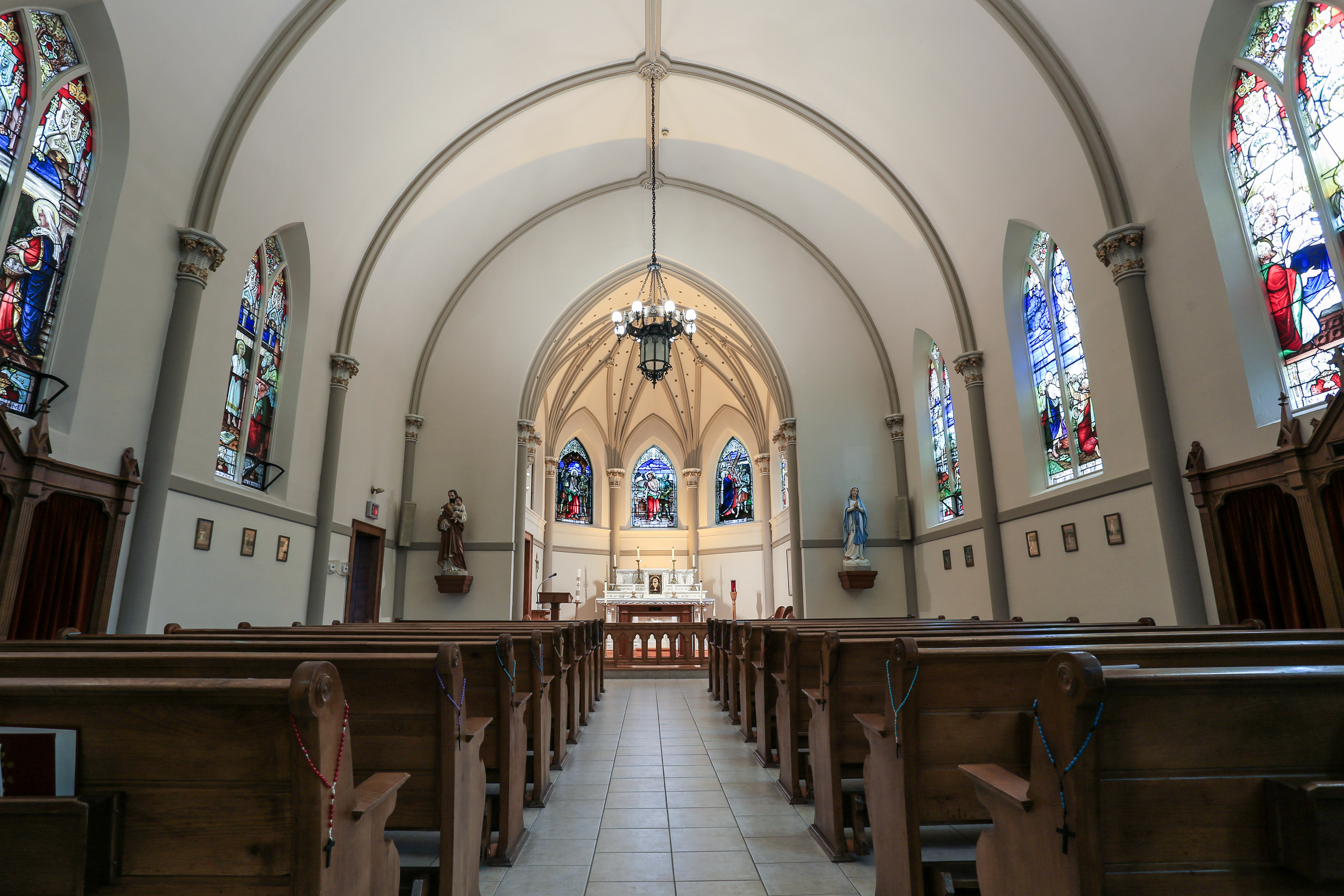
Interior of the Rosary Chapel, 2017

It was originally established as "The Mission of Our Lady of the Assumption among the Hurons in Detroit" in 1728 by the Jesuit missionary Fr. Armand De La Richardie, S.J. In 1765, a 60 by 30 feet (18 m × 9 m) church was erected for the Hurons and some sixty French settler families. Assumption became an official, canonical institution in 1767 under its first pastor, Fr. Pierre Potier S.J. who remained at his post until his death in 1781.

That year, the bishop of Quebec sent his Vicar-General, Fr. Francois-Xavier Hubert to be pastor of Assumption parish. Fr. Hubert initiated plans to build a rectory and a school. A shortage of land for this project was rectified by a donation of land from the Hurons on March 6, 1782. The rectory was built in 1785 and in 1786 as coadjutor to the bishop of Quebec, Fr. Hubert, who had since relocated for his new post, contributed to the building of a new church and sent two women from Quebec to establish a school.

The new church opened in 1787 under Fr. François-Xavier Dufaux, who had replaced the interim pastor, Fr. Pierre Fréchette in 1786. In 1796, Fr. Jean-Baptiste Marchand began his thirty-year pastorate of Assumption parish. Upon Fr. Marchand's death in 1825, his assistant, Fr. Joseph Crevier, succeeded him. Fr. Crevier was pastor until 1831 when he was replaced by Fr. Angus Macdonell.

On July 7, 1842, the cornerstone of the present church was laid. Three years later, on July 20, 1845, the new 60 by 120 feet (18 m × 37 m) rectangular church was inaugurated under Fr. Pierre Point S.J. This rectangular structure forms the nave of the present parish. In 1857, Assumption College was opened, and two years later, in 1859, the bishop of the London Diocese, the Most Reverend Pierre Adolphe Pinsonneault, transferred his see to Sandwich and made Assumption church his cathedral.

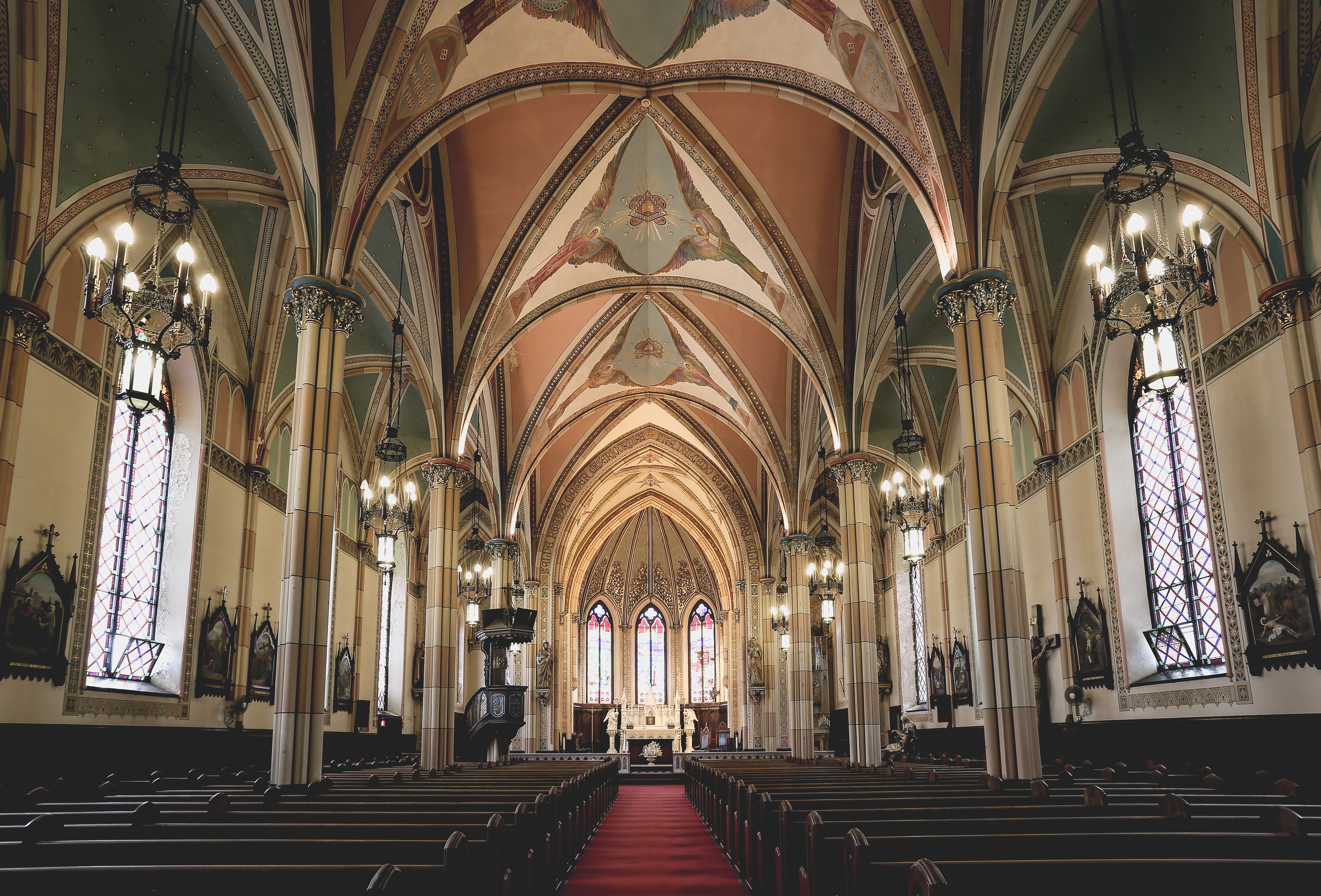
Interior of Assumption Church, looking toward the sanctuary, 2017

On November 10, 1867, following a year-long interregnum, the Most Reverend John Walsh became bishop. In 1869, he returned the see to London, leaving Assumption in the care of Fr. Pierre Dominic Laurent.

In 1870, the Basilian Fathers of Toronto took control of Assumption parish and college under their first superior, Fr. Dennis O’Connor, and parish priest Fr. Jean Joseph Marie Abouli. Four years later, in 1874, Fr. O’Connor oversaw the addition of the tower and sanctuary of the present church.

In 1893, Fr. François-Xavier Semande, an alumnus of Assumption College, became the pastor and installed a new tower bell. In 1896, a new, brick rectory was built and in 1902 both it, and the church, were wired for electricity. In 1907, Fr. Alfred J. Côté became pastor. During his tenure, rosary chapel and the sacristy, begun under Fr. Semande, were completed.

== 20th century to present ==
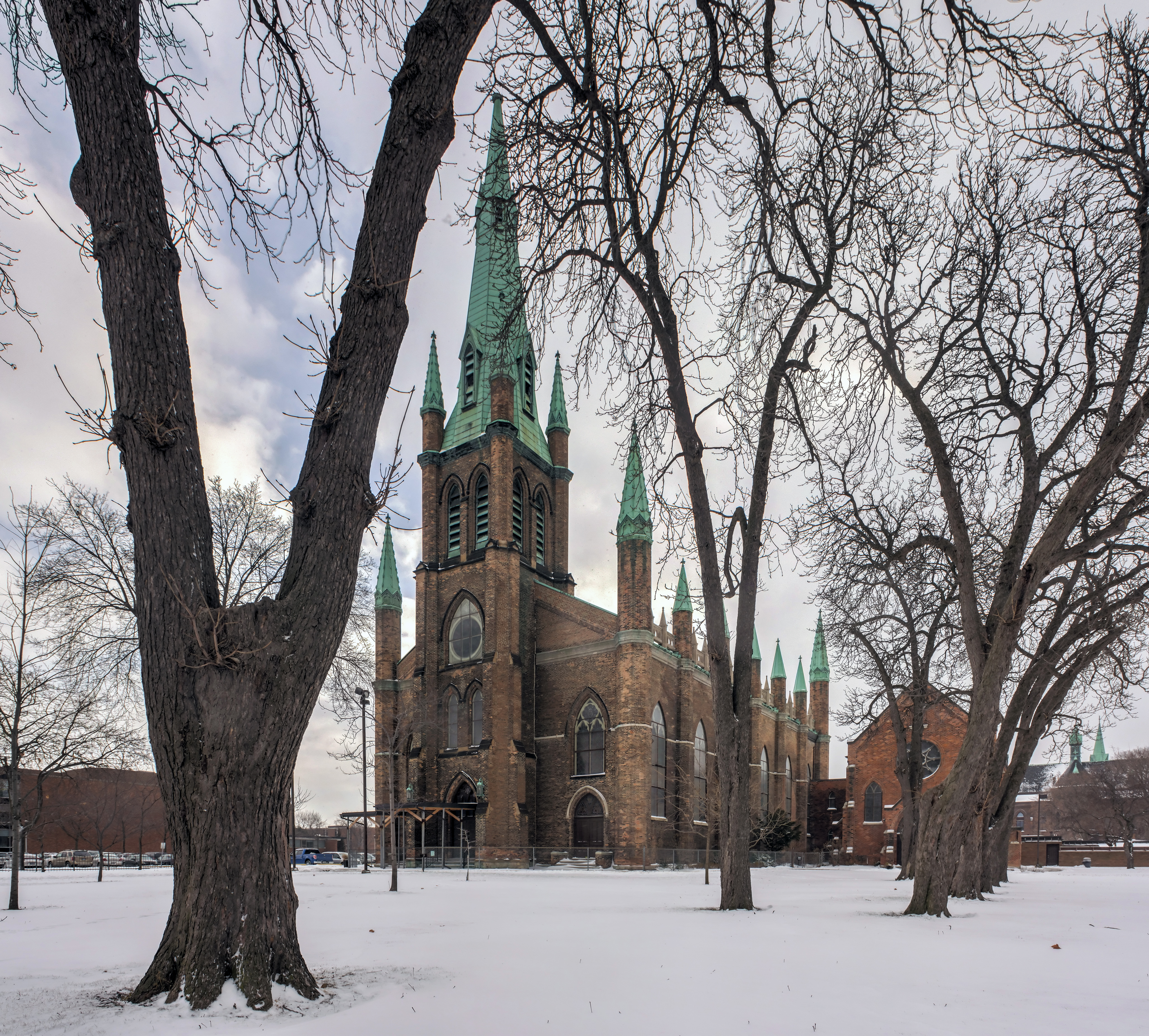
Exterior of the church and surroundings

From 1921 to 1926, the pastor was Fr. Edmund Toussaint Burns, who expanded the side altars and added the communion rail of the present church. From 1926 to 1937, the pastor was Fr. Edward William Allor. He created the Sunday Bulletin, which began on May 6, 1927. Fr. Allor was succeeded by Fr. Luke Léon Beuglet, who was pastor until 1944.

Fr. James Alexander Donlon was pastor from 1944 to 1962. During this time, the statue of Our Lady of the Assumption was erected in the front courtyard. In relatively quick succession, from 1962 to 1973, Frs. Thomas Roland Janisse, Francis J. McCarty, and Clifford J. Crowley had terms as pastor. Fr. Crowley's term witnessed the building of a new rectory, and ended in 1973 with the succession of Fr. Roger F. deBilly, who was replaced two years later, in 1975, by Fr. Lawrence J. Carney, during whose pastorate Assumption church was named a historical building by the City of Windsor.

In 1982, Fr. Patrick J. Gorman was named Pastor, followed by Fr. John Burke in 1985, Fr. Steve Rus in 1986, and in recent years, Fr. George Beaune, Fr. Daniel Zorzi, Fr. John Reddy, Fr. Paul Walsh, Fr. William Riegel, Fr. Don McCleod and Fr. Maurice Restivo. Under Fr. Zorzi's administration, Rosary Chapel was completely redone.

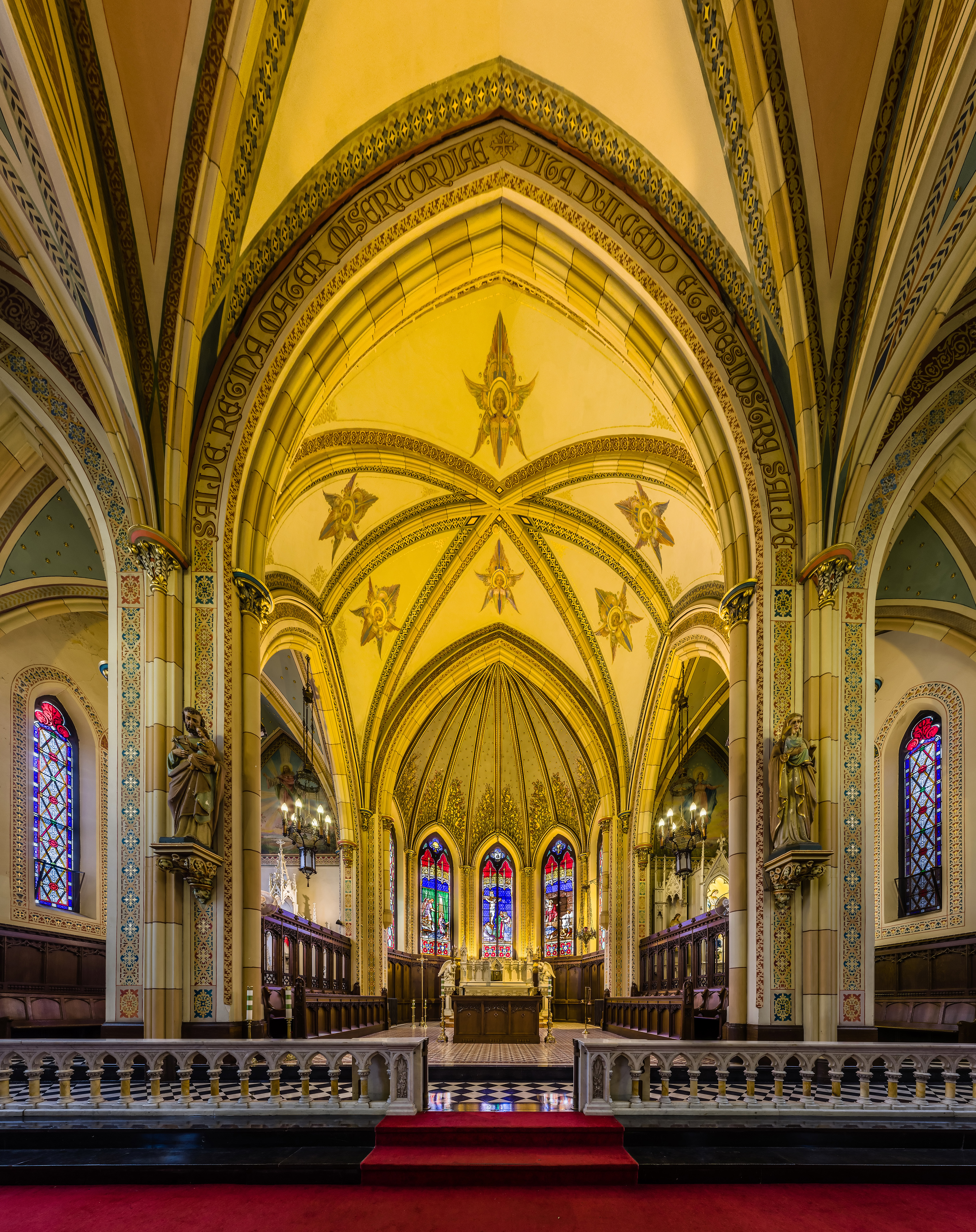
The apse of the church

In 2007, Assumption Church added to its schedule the celebration of the Tridentine Latin Mass on Sundays at 2:00 p.m. The church's high altar, sanctuary, communion rail, and pipe organ make it well-suited to this type of liturgy, which attracts churchgoers from throughout southern Ontario and southeastern Michigan. Assumption's Latin Mass Community hosts regular special events, and the Latin Mass Choir is regularly called upon to sing at special Latin Masses throughout the region.

In 2007, it was learned that Assumption church needed C$9.8 million in extensive restoration repairs. In 2012, a re-assessment of repair costs saw this amount rise to approximately C$15 million.

Assumption Church was closed in November 2014 after the building's condition deteriorated. Worship continued daily in the Rosary Chapel and on weekends at the former Holy Name of Mary Church. The Roman Catholic Diocese of London has stated its commitment to the church's restoration and reopening if a donor comes forward.

In 2017, Assumption parishioners began hosting a series of events to celebrate the parish's 250th year.

In early 2019, local lawyer Paul Mullins spearheaded a fundraising campaign and four-phase restoration plan for the church building.

Construction began in the spring of 2019 on the first phase. Work included the installation of a long-term copper roof, a new heating system, major electrical work, and structural repairs.

The parish moved back into the church on September 8, 2019, and began celebrating weekend masses there again.

The parish began the second phase of the restoration plan in 2020. The second phase includes restoration of the church's ceiling.
