= Edison Bridge (Ohio) =

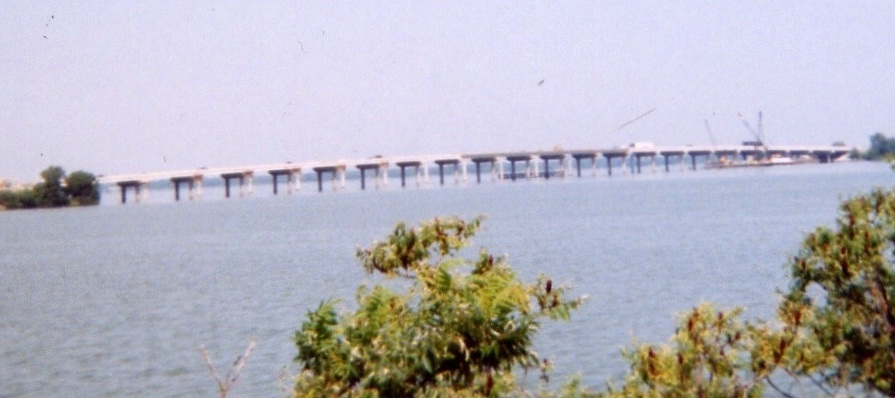
- Bridge in 2005
- Coordinates: 41.4811625°N 82.835744°W
- Carries: SR 2 / SR 269
- Crosses: Sandusky Bay
- Locale: Bay View, Ohio; Danbury Township, Ohio
- Official name: Thomas A. Edison Memorial Bridge
- Maintained by: Ohio Department of Transportation
- ID number: 6200788

Characteristics
- Total length: 2,049 feet (625 m)

History
- Opened: 1965
- Replaces: Bay Bridge

Location
- Interactive map of Edison Bridge

The Thomas A. Edison Memorial Bridge, or the Edison Bridge, carries Ohio State Routes 2 and 269 over Sandusky Bay. The bridge, which is 2,049 feet (625 m) in length, was completed in 1965. It was named for inventor and nearby Milan native Thomas Edison.

== Predecessor ==
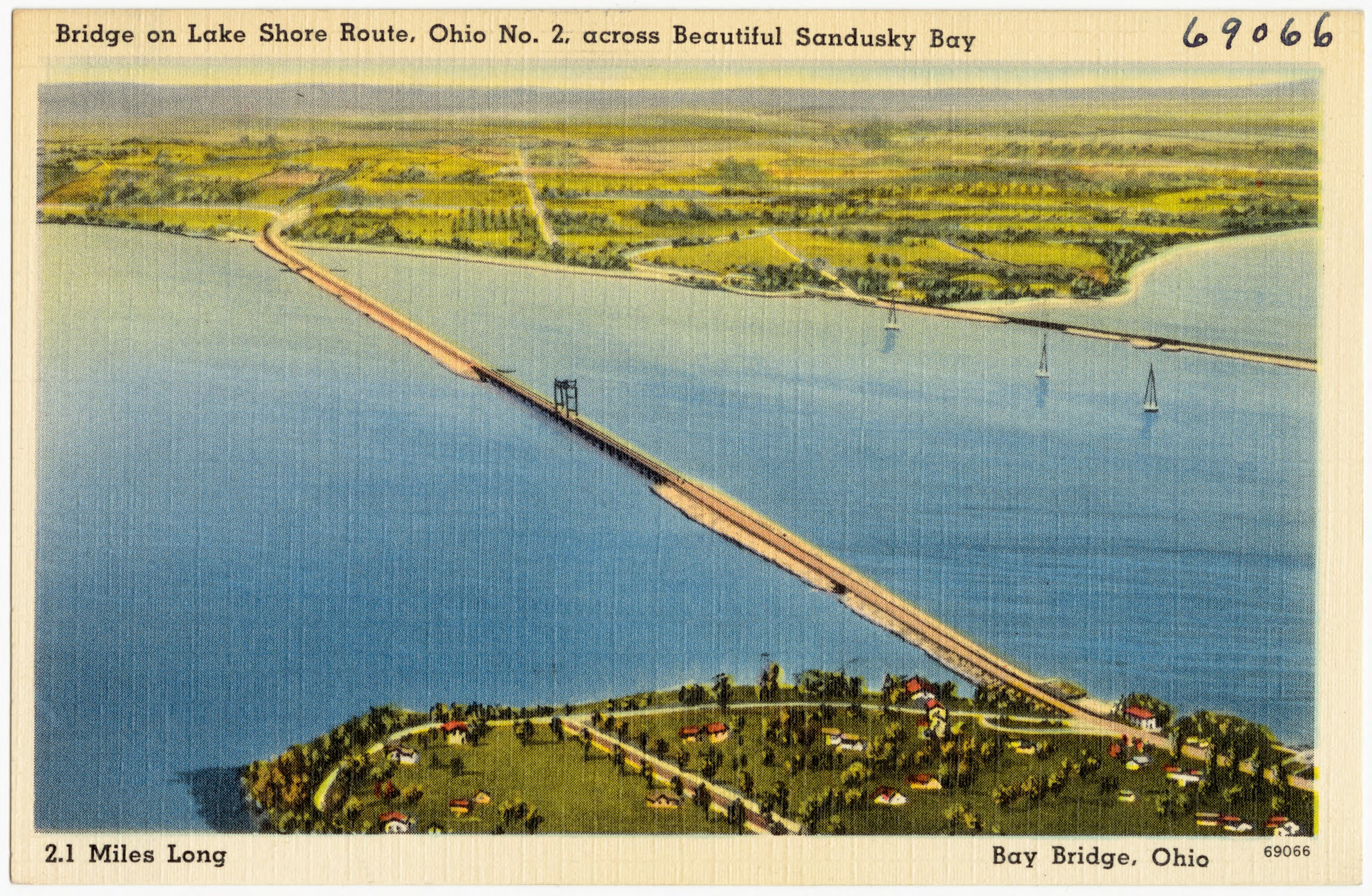
Original Bay Bridge, c.1930s

The Edison Bridge replaced the Bay Bridge, a lift bridge which was dedicated on February 2, 1929. The Bay Bridge was initially a private bridge maintained by the Sandusky Bay Bridge Company, which charged a 50-cent toll; the Ohio Department of Highways bought it for $1,795,000, at first lowering the toll to 25 cents then abolishing it on August 30, 1946. The Ohio Department of Transportation closed the lift span on April 19, 1985 after an inspection which predicted a collapse due to its weight; it formally abandoned the span in April 1986 and subsequently removed it in May 1989, converting its approaches to fishing piers.
