= Pierre-Philippe Potier =

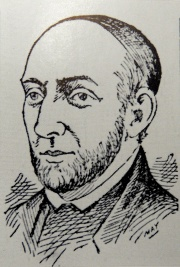
Pierre-Philippe Potier SJ

Pierre-Philippe Potier (also Pottié, Pottié, or Pothier; April 21, 1708 in Blandain, Hainaut, Belgium – July 16, 1781 in what is now Windsor, Ontario, Canada), was a Belgian Jesuit priest, missionary to the Hurons in New France, and lexicographer.

== Life ==
Potier studied at the colleges of Tournai from 1721 to 1727, and Douai from 1727 to 1729). He then entered the novitiate of the Society of Jesus (Jesuits) in Tournai on September 30, 1729. After a year of study of Letters in Lille, he taught for six years (1732–1738) at the college of Béthune. Then he studied theology in Douai in 1741 in preparation for the priesthood. He completed his third year at Armentières and was ordained at Tournai on February 2, 1743.

Shortly thereafter, Potier embarked at La Rochelle for New France on June 18, 1743, where he arrived on October 1 at Quebec. After spending eight months learning the Huron language at Lorette, he departed from Quebec on June 26, 1744.

On September 25, 1744 Potier arrived at the Jesuit mission to the Hurons that was located on Bois Blanc Island in the Detroit River, some 30 kilometers (20 miles) south of Detroit, to serve under the mission superior, Armand de La Richardie. When La Richardie was forced to depart due to illness, Potier took over the management of the mission. In 1747 the mission was destroyed by a Huron group led by Chief Orontony. La Richardie, having returned for a brief period, had the mission re-established upstream, just across the river from Detroit, at La Pointe de Montréal, which is now in the city of Windsor, Ontario.

After New France passed to British control in 1763, Potier's ministry was extended to include those Canadiens residing on the left bank (now the Canadian side) of the Detroit River, in addition to the Hurons. In 1767, the mission of Notre-Dame de l'Assomption was re-organized as a parish, the first in what is now Ontario. Potier was its first parish priest, and therefore the first parish priest in Ontario. He remained in this role until his death in 1781.

== Lexicographer ==
Potier left numerous valuable manuscripts on the Huron language, grammar, a list of linguistic roots, a census of 45 Huron households, account registers of the Huron mission, etc. He composed a Huron-French vocabulary list. He is equally interested in the French language, and left many notebooks for his students on philosophy, theology, history, geography, and copies of his correspondence and itineraries of missionary trips, including a collection of French words and expressions in use at that time. A large part of these documents are in the archives of the Grand Séminaire de Québec.

All this testifies to the great culture and knowledge of Potier, his interest in knowledge, and an excellent mastery of the French, Latin and Huron languages. His writings also demonstrate that, by the middle of the 18th century, the French language was already well established in the Detroit area. He recorded more than a thousand terms in Façons de parler proverbiales, triviales, figurées, etc. des Canadiens au xviiie siècle, the only known lexicon of French spoken in New France.
