= Armand de La Richardie =

French Roman Catholic missionary

Armand de La Richardie (7 June 1686 – 17 March 1758) was a French Roman Catholic missionary in New France.

== Life ==
Born at Périgueux, he entered the Society of Jesus at Bordeaux, 4 October 1703, and in 1725 was sent to the Canada mission. He spent the two following years helping Pierre Daniel Richer at Lorette, and studying the Wyandot language. In 1728 he went to Detroit to re-establish the long-interrupted mission to the dispersed Wyandot (Petun-Huron) in the West. Not a solitary professing Christian did he find, but among the aged not a few had been baptized. The new Indian church, though "seventy cubits long" (105 ft?) was scarcely spacious enough to contain the fervent congregation of practising Wyandot. During the night, 24–25 March 1746, the father was stricken with paralysis, and on 29 July he was placed in an open canoe and thus conveyed to Quebec.

In 1747 the Wyandot insisted on his returning to restore tranquillity to their nation. The father had almost completely recovered from his palsy, and willingly consented. He set out from Montreal on 10 September, and reached Detroit on 20 October. From this date until 1751, leaving the loyal Wyandot in the keeping of Father Potier at the Detroit village, he directed all his energies to reclaiming Nicolas Orontondi's band of insurgent Wyandot. These had already in 1740, owing to a bloody feud with the Detroit Odawas and to the reluctance, if not refusal, of Governor Beauharnais to let the Wyandot remove to Montreal, sullenly left Detroit and settled at "Little Lake" (now Rondeau Harbour) near Sandusky. There they had been won over to the English cause, had openly revolted in 1747, and had murdered a party of Frenchmen. Early in the spring of 1748 Orontondi set fire to the fort and cabins at Sandusky, and withdrew to the White River, not far from the junction of the Ohio and Wabash Rivers. Until his death, which occurred some time after September 1749, Orontondi continued to intrigue with the English emissaries, the Haudenosaunee, and the disaffected Miamis. When there was no longer doubt of the renegade leader's demise, de La Richardie resolved on a final attempt at conciliation. He had already at intervals spent months at a time among the fugitives, and now in September 1750, at the peril of his life he started, with only three canoe men for the country of the "Nicolites" as they were then termed. The greater number remained obdurate. It is the descendants of the latter who in July 1843, removed from their lands at Upper Sandusky, Ohio, to beyond the Mississippi, to occupy the Wyandot reserve in the extreme north-eastern part of Oklahoma. The father's failing strength obliged his superiors to recall him to Quebec in 1751, and on 30 June he bade a final farewell to the Mission of Our Lady of the Assumption among the Wyandot in Detroit. From the autumn of 1751 until his death he filled various offices in Quebec College. His Wyandot name was Ondechaouasti. He died at Quebec.
