= Sandusky Bay =

Bay on Lake Erie in Ohio

Coordinates: 41°28′13″N 82°51′18″W

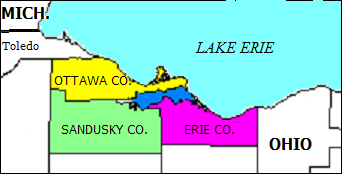
Location of Sandusky Bay (darker blue extending southwest from Lake Erie).

Sandusky Bay is a bay on Lake Erie in northern Ohio, formed at the mouth of the Sandusky River. It was identified as Lac Sandouské on a 1718 French map, with early variations recorded that suggest the name was derived from Native American languages. The Thomas A. Edison Memorial Bridge was constructed across it in the 20th century to connect highways in Erie and Ottawa counties.

== History ==
The bay was known to historic and ancient indigenous peoples, including the Iroquoian-speaking Wyandot who dominated this area (they were called the Huron people by French explorers and colonists).

Located in territory claimed by early French explorers, the bay was identified on a 1718 map by Guillaume Delisle as Lac Sandouské (later anglicized as Lake Sandusky). The Indians of the area, primarily Wyandot (Huron) were said to refer to what is known as the Sandusky River and the bay, as well as the general area, as saundustee, meaning "water" or andusti, "cold water". In his 1734 history of New France, Charlevoix transliterated the word as "Chinouski". Sandusky Bay is identified as "Lac (Lake) Sandouské" on a 1718 map by Guillaume DeLisle. The name "L.(Lac) Sandoski" appears on a 1733 map. Sandusky Bay was also called Lac Otsandaské, in another French transliteration of the Wyandot. The Wyandot occupied areas along the river at the Upper and Lower falls.

In 1745, Chief Nicolas of the Wyandot allowed the English to establish a trading post on the north shore of the bay, which they called Fort Sandusky and the French knew as Fort Sandoské. This was the first fort built by Europeans in Ohio Country. The bay has also been referred to as Lake Junandat (derived from a 1754 French fort) and Lake Otsandoské (also related to the Wyandot term for the lake). Lake Sandusky, Sandoski Bay, Sandusky Bay, and Sandusky Lake are also recorded.

French engineer Gaspard-Joseph Chaussegros de Léry passed through this area in 1754, commanding forces to reinforce Fort Detroit at the outbreak of the French and Indian War. He found the ruins of the earlier fort on the north shore of what he referred to as Lac Otsandoské. He had the French Fort Junandat built in 1754 diagonally across from the former Ft. Sandusky.

== Geography ==
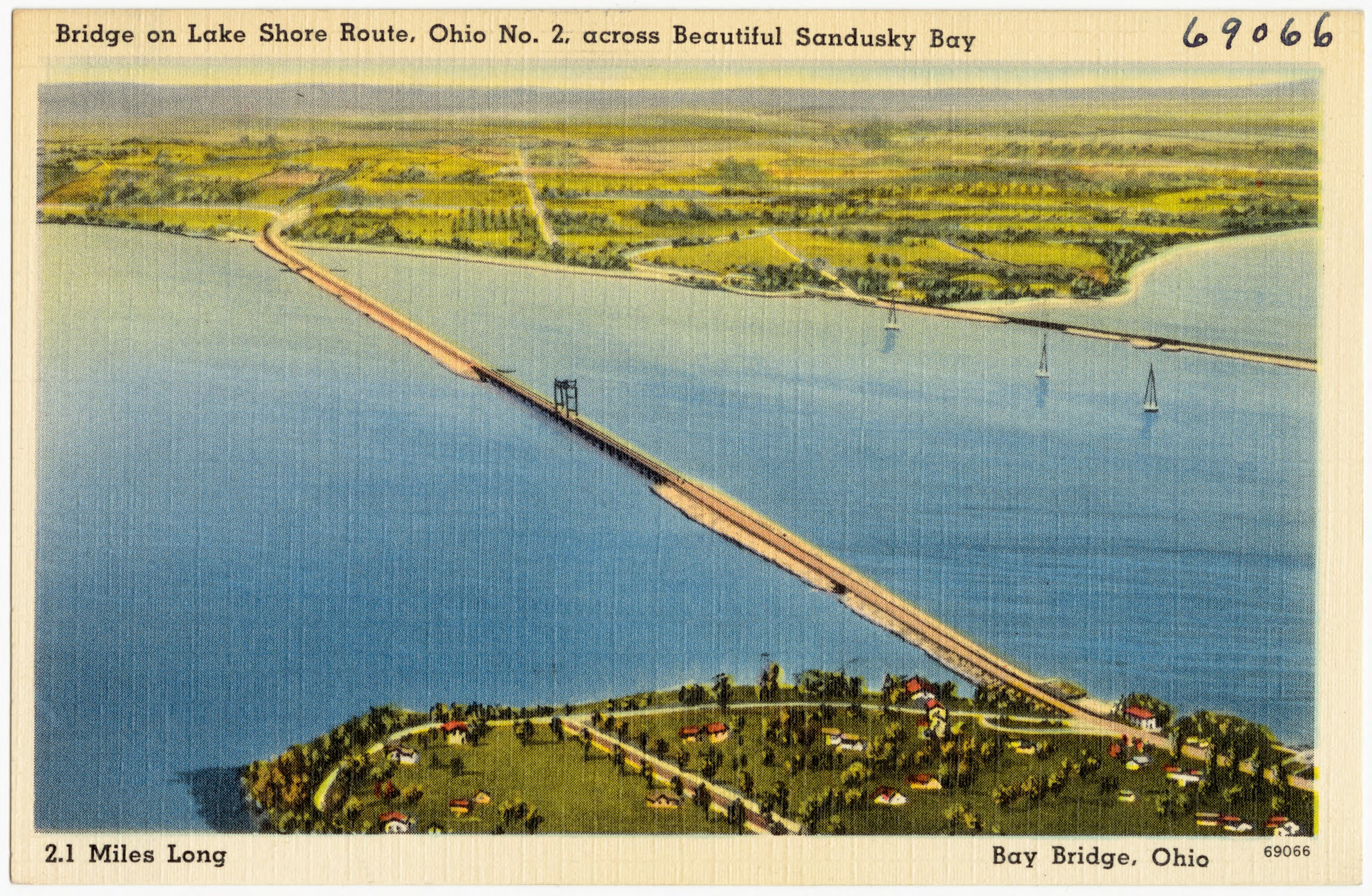
Original Bay Bridge carrying SR 2, c. 1930s

Sandusky Bay is one of the principal bodies of water in northern Ohio. It is situated between Erie, Ottawa, and Sandusky counties in Ohio and is part of Lake Erie.

According to author Francis Leroy Landacre, it is a "shallow, almost land-locked harbor averaging about twelve feet in depth, some fourteen or fifteen miles in length, with a width of something like two miles." It contains numerous marshes and serves as an entry point for several streams. Sandusky Bay runs from Muddy Creek Bay to Cedar Point, which separates Sandusky Bay from Lake Erie. The Sandusky River drains into the bay at its westernmost point.

The Thomas A. Edison Memorial Bridge carries Route 2 and Route 269 across Sandusky Bay at its eastern end. This is the only direct highway link between Ottawa and Erie counties. Sandusky Bay can be viewed from Marblehead Lighthouse at Marblehead Lighthouse State Park.

Slightly east of Edison Bridge is another bridge spanning a chain of artificial islands. This bridge carries rail traffic including Amtrak's Lake Shore Limited.

The Sandusky Bay Water Trail was dedicated on June 2, 2007 to provide recreational opportunities along Sandusky Bay. The water of Sandusky Bay is shallow and rarely clear. According to author Tom Cross, "Sandusky Bay is known for great early spring crappie fishing."

== Current events ==
On June 14, 2012, the U.S. Customs and Border Protection agency opened Sandusky Bay Station.

Samples of water from Sandusky Bay gathered on July 30 and 31, 2012 showed that invasive Asian carp may have reached Lake Erie. If so, they may adversely affect Lake Erie's $1 billion fishing industry and $10 billion tourism industry.

== Wars and rebellions ==
- Queen Anne's War (Old French War). Colonel John Bradstreet sailed sixty long boats into Sandusky Bay and encamped on September 20, 1704.
- War of 1812. United States General William Henry Harrison had troops drag boats across what was known as the de Lery portage from Sandusky Bay to Lake Erie in order to engage British warships in the lake.
- Upper Canada Rebellion. Canadian rebels planned to travel across frozen Lake Erie in the winter from Sandusky Bay to Pelee Island. They were harried by regular British military forces and found that residents had abandoned the island.

== Gallery ==
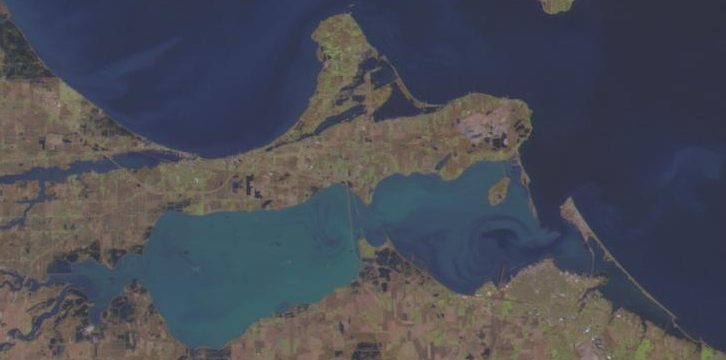
Taken on March 20, 2022 with Resourcesat-2.

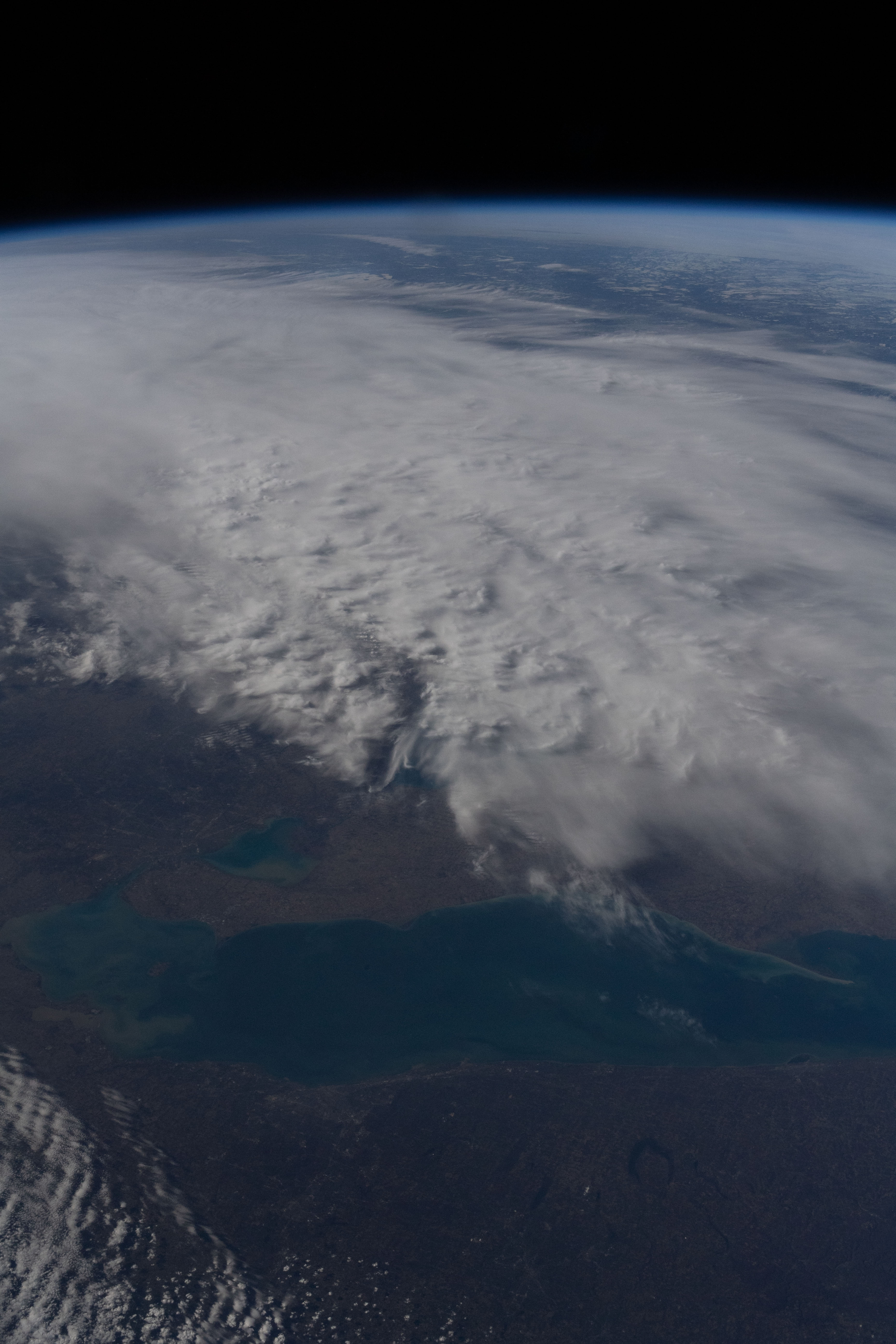
Greenish water flows out of Sandusky Bay (lower left) into Lake Erie in this photo taken on April 12, 2022 from the International Space Station.

== See also ==
- Asian carp in North America
- Fort Sandusky
