= Nicholas Orontony =

Wyandot leader

Nicholas Orontony (c. 1695–1750) was an 18th-century Wyandot leader who, in the years before the French and Indian War, tried to escape the domination of New France over Native people in the Detroit region by resettling in the Ohio country and forming an anti-French tribal coalition. His efforts at trying to organize armed resistance to a European power, culminating in events in 1747 sometimes known as the "Conspiracy of Nicholas", made him a forerunner of more famous Native leaders in the region such as Pontiac, Blue Jacket, and Tecumseh.

== Biography ==
Little is known of Orontony's early life. He was probably born at the Wyandot village that along with the neighboring Jesuit-established St. Ignace Mission, French and Odawa (Ottawa) villages formed the French-Canadian settlement of St. Ignace. The name "Orontony" ( yandot: "Rontondi", rendered variously in French and English as "Rondoenie", "Wanduny", "Orontondi", etc.) was a title bestowed upon the leader of the Wyandot Turtle clan. This Orontony also received the name "Nicholas" after he was baptized by a French Catholic missionary at Detroit, perhaps Father Armand de la Richardie, sometime after 1728.

In the early 17th century, the Wyandots had settled near Detroit, but soon fell into conflict with the neighbouring Ottawas due to their alliance with their former enemies the Catawba (Flatheads). In 1739, the Wyandot fearing for their lives, Orontony and two other leaders requested resettlement nearer the centre of New France and in 1740, Orontony pressed the request to Governor of New France Charles de la Boische, Marquis de Beauharnois in person. The authorities hesitated to act and some Wyandots made a unilateral relocation to "Little Lake Sandusky" (Sandusky Bay, near the later city of Sandusky, Ohio). There, they came under the influence of British traders and of an established mixed ethnic population, including Haudenosaunee, settled on the Cuyahoga River, near present Cleveland, Ohio.

Increasing economic exploitation was bringing pressure and conflict to the region and the French sought to protect their assets against non-French traders, especially those from Pennsylvania. The tensions were exacerbated by Orontony's mistrust of the French. The outbreak of King George's War in 1744 sparked open conflict and, in the spring of 1747 five French traders returning to Detroit were killed near Cuyahoga. Orontony's band were implicated, and the commander at Detroit, Paul-Joseph le Moyne de Longueuil, Chevalier de Longueuil, reacted in fear of an escalating situation.

The British intervened to encourage Orontony's band, George Croghan calling upon Pennsylvania for support. In November ten Haudenosaunee warriors from the Ohio, responded and the government of Pennsylvania voted them a present of GBP 150 and one of GBP 50 for the band at Cuyahoga. The Haudenosaunee's declaration had fallen short of open war on the French but the garrison at Detroit was fearful. Orontony drew sympathy from Mikinak, and the Potawatomis and Ojibwas and relationships with the French became increasingly strained and disrupted. The British traders continued to court Orontony at Sandusky and he incited the Miamis to destroy a French trading post. Orontony then conducted a mission to Detroit exhorting peace. However, while there, a party of Indians killed three Frenchmen near the fort and then took refuge on Bois Blanc Island.

Detroit was strengthened by a convoy of reinforcements in September 1747 but to no avail. Orontony destroyed the fort and resettled his band at Coshocton, Ohio. The remainder went farther east to build a new town at Kuskusky, near modern New Castle, Pennsylvania. Orontony and his peers were further courted, among others by Pennsylvanian agent Conrad Weiser in 1748. However, the agents failed to realise when Anglo-French hostilities ceased or when Orontony himself died, probably around 1750 as the victim of a smallpox epidemic.
