= Treaty of Fort Niagara =

Several British American colonial treaties

Treaty of Peace, etc., with the Chenussios and other enemy Senecas, concluded by Sir William Johnson, baronet, at Niagara, 6 August 1764. Articles of Peace concluded by Sir William Johnson, baronet, with the Hurons of Detroit, at Niagara, 18 July 1764.
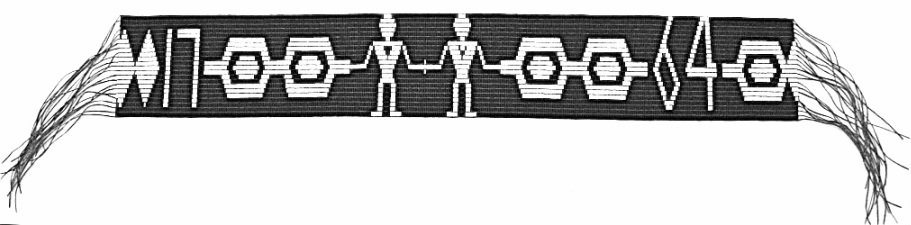
- Replica of the Covenant Chain Wampum presented by Sir William Johnson at the conclusion of the Council of Niagara. Created by Ken Maracle.
- Signed: 1 August 1764
- Location: Fort Niagara, Niagara County, Province of New York
- Negotiators: Sir William Johnson, 1st Baronet
- Parties: Great Britain; Haudenosaunee Confederacy: Haudenosaunee; Mohawk; Nipissing; Seneca; Northwestern Confederacy: Cherokee; Iroquois; Lenape; Miami; Odawa; Ojibwa; Potawatomi; Shawnee; Wabash Confederacy; Wyandot; Seven Nations of Canada: Akwesasne; Algonquin; Cayuga; Kahnawake; Kanesatake; Oneida; Onondaga; Oswegatchie; Others: Menominee; Mississaugas

The 1764 Treaty of Fort Niagara is one of the first treaty agreements made between First Nations and The Crown. It is a notable example of The Crown's recognition of Indigenous sovereignty in the years preceding the American Revolution. However, the agreement was recorded in wampum and no paper document was signed; Canadian law does not recognize the legality of the agreement.

== Overview ==
Following the Royal Proclamation of 1763, the Crown planned to solidify its presence in North America in relation to the land of Indigenous peoples.

After weeks of discussion and ceremonial activities, the 1764 Treaty of Niagara was agreed to between Sir William Johnson for the Crown and 24 independent First Nations. Johnson was largely aided by his Mohawk consort, Molly Brant, who advised Johnson on how to appropriately negotiate the treaty. The Indigenous nations present included the Haudenosaunee, Seneca, Wyandot of Detroit, Menominee, Algonquin, Nipissing, Ojibwa, Mississaugas, and others who were part of the Seven Nations of Canada and the Western Lakes Confederacy.

The treaty was concluded on 1 August 1764 and transferred possession of a narrow four-mile strip of land by the Niagara River's western shore, as well as established the relationship that was supposed to be honoured by the new settlers moving into what would become Canada. This treaty signaled the assembled Indigenous Nations ratification of the Royal Proclamation of 1763 and extended the Silver Covenant Chain of Friendship into the Great Lakes Region of the continent.

The Royal Proclamation of 1763 established the British definition of Indian Country. On those lands, the Crown claimed sovereignty but also decreed that the land was to be considered in the possession of the Indigenous peoples who occupied them. Consequently, to transfer ownership of the land to the Crown through the surrendering of the land from the indigenous peoples, Great Britain began formalizing the Treaty of Niagara with the First Nations on 8 July 1764, through this Treaty Council. In protest, the Ottawa of Detroit, the Wyandot of Sandusky, and the Lenape and Shawnee of the Ohio refused to attend the Treaty Council. The treaty created a new Covenant Chain between Britain and the First Nations of the western Great Lakes. During the War of 1812, nations involved with this treaty allied themselves with the British, as the nations believed the treaty bound them to the British cause.

Journals of the Board of Trade and Plantations, Volume 12: January 1764 - December 1767 (1936), pp. 109-120, list two treaties negotiated at this time:

- Treaty of Peace, etc., with the Chenussios and other enemy Senecas, concluded by Sir William Johnson, baronet, at Niagara, 6 August 1764.
- Articles of Peace concluded by Sir William Johnson, baronet, with the Hurons of Detroit, at Niagara, 18 July 1764

== Further treaties ==
Following the 1764 treaty, two additional agreements were made at Fort Niagara in the following decades:

- The Niagara Purchase of 1781
- The Treaty of Fort Niagara, 1787

The treaty area ceded in the second treaty was expanded to include Niagara Township, and portions of Stamford, Willoughby and Bertie Townships.
