= Éléonore Sioui =

Wyandot healer and activist (1920–2006)

Éléonore Sioui OC
- Born: May 20, 1920; Wendake, Quebec, Canada
- Died: March 2006 (aged 85)
- Citizenship: Huron-Wendat Nation
- Education: University of Miami (MA); Union for Experimenting Colleges and Universities (PhD)
- Occupations: Healer; writer; activist
- Spouse: Georges Albert Sioui (m. 1946; div. 1970)
- Children: 7, including Georges E. Sioui and Konrad Sioui
- Honours: Order of Canada

Éléonore Sioui OC (May 20, 1920–March 2006) was a Wyandot healer, writer, and activist who has been described as the "spiritual mother" of all Wyandot people. She was born in the First Nations reserve of Wendake, Quebec, Canada, and raised by parents who emphasized traditional Wyandot teachings and the importance of education. A renowned healer in Wendake and beyond, she saw writing as medicine and used the written word to critique the Government of Canada's assimilationist policies. At age 68, she became the first Indigenous woman in Canada to receive a PhD, and in 2001, she was inducted into the Order of Canada.

== Early life ==
Sioui was born in Wendake, Quebec, Canada, on May 20, 1920, the first child of Caroline Sioui (née Dumont) and Emery Sioui. For the first several years of Sioui's life, the family lived in the woods. When Sioui was five years old, they moved to a ranch, where they raised fur-bearing animals and made a living by selling the animals' fur. Sioui attended a missionary school in Loretteville until she was fourteen years old, then spent the rest of her teenage years at home helping with the family business and caring for her siblings.

== Education ==
Sioui's mother, Caroline, was a respected healer and artisan, and her father, Emery, had been the hereditary chief of the Wyandots of the Forty Arpents Reserve until 1904, when the Canadian government illegally sold the Forty Arpents Wyandots' land and forced them to relocate to the larger reserve of Jeune Lorette (in Wendake). Caroline and Emery were devout Catholics who followed traditional Wyandot teachings and taught their children to do the same. They also taught their children the importance of education.

Much of Sioui's education came from her family, who trained her in traditional Wyandot healing practices. Indigenous wisdom formed the core of her education. Her skill as a healer was well-known in Wendake and beyond, and she played many important roles in her community, including "elder, historian, storyteller, prayer leader, and keeper of the council fire." She also read about Canadian politics and sought out political radio programs, as she realized that she would need to be proficient in the rhetoric of the dominant culture in order to combat the impacts of colonialism on her people.

After her children had grown up and her father had passed, Sioui pursued formal education. She studied at Laval University in Quebec and the University of Ottawa, earning a bachelor's degree in education before going on to earn a Master of Arts at the University of Miami. In 1988, when she was 68, Sioui completed a doctoral program in Native American philosophy at the Union for Experimenting Colleges and Universities, becoming the first Indigenous woman in Canada to receive a PhD. In her doctoral dissertation, titled "Life of a Huron-Wyandot Woman: The Realization of an Impossible Dream", she credited her family's teaching: "I am proud to say that my main educational background was acquired through my constant contact with my family." Sioui's activism often stressed the liberatory power of accessible education for Indigenous people and for women and girls.

== Career and activism ==
Sioui was a well-known and well-regarded healer in Wendake. Her multifaceted education and her ability to speak French, English, and Spanish also led her to a government career, beginning with a job as a switchboard operator for the Government of Canada. In the 1970s, she held a variety of government roles, including consultant, teacher, and economic developer. Through these roles, she gained an understanding of the workings of the colonial government. Meanwhile, she began to attend and participate in band council meetings, questioning the socioeconomic conditions that marginalized and disempowered the Wyandot people. Her critique of colonialism and its effects on her people eventually connected her to activists outside her nation and to the global Indigenous rights movement.

A prolific writer whose publications were read internationally, Sioui "used the written word to express her beliefs, propose solutions, and disseminate an anticolonial critique of contemporary oppressive regimes." She described her writing as a form of medicine for the wounds that colonialism inflicted on Indigenous peoples. Sioui's writing often emphasized that Indigenous peoples in Canada had been robbed of their voice, and that Indigenous women in particular were given no opportunity to speak for themselves.

Sioui founded the Centre socio‑culturel amérindien Kondiaronk (transl. Kondiaronk American Indian Socio-Cultural Centre) in Wendake in late 1973. She intended the Centre to be a place where Indigenous people who were passing through the region could receive help in accessing health care, social services, and other government services. It has since become known as an institution that disseminates and promotes Indigenous art and thought. In 1974, she founded Kanatha, a magazine by and for Indigenous peoples in Quebec that became popular throughout Canada. She later wrote and published several books of poetry.

Much of Sioui's activism took the form of letters to government officials and articles published in magazines in which she critiqued policies affecting Indigenous peoples in Canada, especially Indigenous women and girls. Sioui saw women, and the restoration of women's rights, as integral to the project of improving conditions for Indigenous peoples around the world. Her son Georges E. Sioui said in 2013:

[Sioui] ingrained in all of us that women have the power to create societies: they know the price and the value of life because they conceive and give birth to us; they are the ones who teach us the reasons why we have to have compassion, care and solicitude for others and for all other-than-human beings. Therefore, allowing women to have and take their place at the centre of our communities and societies is much more than an act of justice: it is an irreplaceable strategy for our global survival.

Indigenous spirituality was at the heart of Sioui's writing. She was known internationally as the "mother of her nation" and the "spiritual mother" of the Wyandot people, or of Indigenous people in North America more generally. In 1976, she was invited to speak as the representative of North American Indigenous women at the World Women's Conference in East Berlin. She spoke on the problems facing Indigenous women in Canada, and afterward, she submitted a report on the conference to the Government of Canada, including a proposal for a project to improve Indigenous women's economic conditions. Sioui subsequently spoke on behalf of Indigenous women in North America at several other international conferences.

== Personal life ==
On June 10, 1946, Sioui married Georges Albert Sioui, a trapper and hunting guide from the local community. Many people in Sioui's life criticized her decision to marry a fellow Indigenous person and saw her marriage as "economic and social suicide". The couple struggled financially, and Georges developed a drinking habit; they separated around the beginning of the 1960s and divorced in 1970. During their marriage, they had seven children together, including Konrad Sioui, who grew up to become grand chief of the Huron-Wendat Nation, and Georges E. Sioui, an academic, writer, and professor. As of 2001, Sioui had twenty-one grandchildren.

Sioui died in March 2006.

== Publications ==
=== Poetry ===
- Andatha (1985). Val D'or, Quebec: Editions Hyperborée. ISBN 9782920402065, 2920402064. OCLC 17188016.
- Femme de l’île (1990).
- Corps à coeur éperdu (1992). Val D'or, Quebec: D'ici et d'Ailleurs. ISBN 9782921055246, 2921055244. OCLC 26809023.

=== Other works ===
- Life of a Huron-Wyandot Woman: The Realization of an Impossible Dream (1988). PhD thesis. Union for Experimenting Colleges and Universities.

== Honours ==
In 2001, Sioui was made an Officer of the Order of Canada in recognition of her Indigenous rights activism.
