= Seven Nations =

Seven Nations may refer to:

- Seven Nations of Canada, a historical First Nations confederacy
- Seven Nations (band), a Celtic rock band
  - Seven Nations (album), a 2000 album by the band
- Seven Nations (Bible), nations that according to the Hebrew Bible lived in the Land of Canaan prior to the arrival of the Israelites
