= Hereditary chiefs in Canada =

Hereditary chiefs in Canada are leaders within chosen First Nations in Canada who represent different houses or clans and who, according to some interpretations of case law from the Supreme Court of Canada, have jurisdiction over territories that fall outside of band-controlled reservation land. Passed down intergenerationally, hereditary chieftaincies are rooted in traditional forms of Indigenous governance models which predate colonization. The Indian Act (1876), still in force today, imposed electoral systems to fill band council positions. Although recognized by and accountable to the Government of Canada, band chiefs do not hold the cultural authority of hereditary chiefs, who often serve as knowledge keepers responsible for the upholding of a First Nation's traditional customs, legal systems, and cultural practices.

When serving as Lieutenant Governor of British Columbia, Judith Guichon postulated that the role of hereditary chiefs mirrored that of Canada's constitutional monarch, being the representative of "sober second thought and wisdom, not the next political cycle; but, rather, enduring truths and the evolution of our nation through generations."

== Hereditary Chiefs ==
There are over 600 First Nations Communities in Canada, they meet annually to choose one nationally elected chief, an executive committee and ten regional Chiefs.

=== Canada's founding peoples ===
The founding Aboriginal peoples of Canada are:

- First Nations
- Inuit
- Métis

==== Seven Indigenous groups ====
The Seven Nations of Canada:

- Onondaga of Oswegatchie
- Mohawk of Akwesasne
- Mohawk of Kahnawake
- Mohawk and Anishinabeg (Algonquin and Nipissing) of Kanesatake
- Abenaki of Odanak
- Abenaki of Bécancour (Wôlinak)
- Wendat of Wendake

==== Six First Nations of Canada ====
First Nations on the Canadian Pacific Coast:

- Coast Salish
- Haida
- Interior Salish
- Kwakwakaʼwakw
- Nisga’a and Gitxsan
- Nuu-chah-nulth
- Tsimshian

First Nations in the plains:

- Blackfoot
- Kainai
- Sacree
- Northern Peigan

== Delgamuukw v British Columbia ruling ==
It was hereditary chiefs of the Gitxsan and Wetʼsuwetʼen who acted as plaintiffs in the Delgamuukw v British Columbia decision (1997) of the Supreme Court of Canada. The ruling, overturning a lower court decision, has been important to ongoing definition of the protection of Aboriginal title in relation to section 35 of Canada's Constitution Act, 1982, and also significant in accepting the standing of the hereditary chiefs as plaintiffs, relying on their authority to speak for their communities and nations.

== See also ==
- Indigenous law
- Office of the Hereditary Chiefs of the Wetʼsuwetʼen
- Monarchy of Canada
