= Algonquin =

Algonquin or Algonquian—and the variation Algonki(a)n—may refer to:

== Languages and peoples ==
- Algonquian languages, a large subfamily of Native American languages in a wide swath of eastern North America from Canada to Virginia
  - Algonquin language, the language of the Algonquin people in Canada, for which the Algonquian languages group is named
- Algonquian peoples, Indigenous tribes of North America composed of people who speak the Algonquian languages
  - Algonquin people, a subgroup of Algonquian people who speak the Algonquin language and live in Quebec and Ontario, Canada

== Arts and media ==
- Algonquin (film), a 2013 Canadian film
- Algonquin Books, an imprint of Workman Publishing Company
- Algonquin, a fictional island, based on Manhattan, in the video game Grand Theft Auto IV
- A dog from the 1988 film Elvira: Mistress of the Dark

== Buildings and institutions ==
- The Algonquin, a hotel in St. Andrews, New Brunswick
- Algonquin Club, Boston, Massachusetts
- Algonquin Hotel, New York City
  - Algonquin Round Table, a group of New York writers, critics, actors and wits who regularly congregated at the Algonquin Hotel
- Algonquin Power & Utilities, a utility company operating in North America
- Algonquin Radio Observatory, a radio telescope research facility in the Algonquin Provincial Park, Ontario, Canada
- Algonquin Regional High School, located in Northborough, Massachusetts
- Algonquin College, a college in Ontario, Canada

== Military ==
- French ship Algonquin (1753), ship built in Quebec City, New France
- The Algonquin Regiment (Northern Pioneers), an infantry regiment in the Canadian Forces
- HMCS Algonquin, at least two ships of the Canadian Navy
- USAHS Algonquin, a 1926 hospital ship of the United States Army Transportation Service
- USS Algonquin, at least three ships of the United States Navy

== Places ==
- Glacial Lake Algonquin, a North American proglacial lake at the time of the last ice age

=== Canada ===
- Algonquin, Ontario, a community in the township of Augusta
- Algonquin Highlands, Ontario, a township
- South Algonquin, Ontario, a township
- Algonquin Provincial Park, a provincial park in Ontario
- Algonquin Island, one of the Toronto Islands in Ontario

=== United States ===
- Algonquin, Illinois
- Algonquin Township, McHenry County, Illinois
- Algonquin, Louisville, Kentucky
- Algonquin, Maryland
- Algonquin, Michigan
- Algonkian Regional Park, Virginia
- Algonquin Peak, the second highest mountain in New York state
- "Algonquin", A 12,574' peak in the Indian Peaks Wilderness, Colorado
- "Algonquin", also a small Northwestern community located in the city limits of Sault Ste. Marie, Michigan

== Court cases ==
- Fed. Energy Admin. v. Algonquin SNG, Inc., a 1976 U.S. Supreme Court case that confirmed the President's broad authority to regulate foreign trade, specifically by using fees and tariffs, when national security is at risk.

== See also ==
- Algonquian language (disambiguation)
- Virginia Algonquian (disambiguation)
