= Konrad Sioui =

Grand Chief of Wendake, Canada (born 1953)

Grand Chief of the Huron-Wendat Nation
- In office 2008–2020
- Preceded by: Max Gros-Louis
- Succeeded by: Rémy Vincent

Personal details
- Born: 1953 (age 72–73)
- Parent: Éléonore Sioui (mother)

Konrad Sioui (born in 1953) was the Grand Chief (French: Grand Chef) of Wendake, an urban reserve that is an enclave within what is now Quebec City, Canada. He succeeded Max Gros-Louis in 2008 and was succeeded by Rémy Vincent in 2020.

Sioui is a hereditary chief of the Bear Clan of the Wendat Nation.

He represented the Assembly of First Nations in Geneva from 1985 to 1992 while being the official and national spokesperson on constitutional reform issues between 1984 and 1994. He was a candidate in the AFN's 1994 leadership convention, but lost to Ovide Mercredi.

== R. v. Sioui ==
In R. v. Sioui, known as the Sioui Decision, Sioui won a unanimous decision at the Supreme Court of Canada in 1991. The ruling acknowledged that a 1760 document signed between British General James Murray and the Huron band, the Huron-British Treaty of 1760, is still valid as it was an international agreement entered into between sovereign nations.
