= Indian Confederacy =

Indian Confederacy may refer to:

- Northwestern Indian Confederacy
- Maratha Confederacy
