= The Pictou Sessions =

Studio album by Seven Nations
- Released: 2000

Seven Nations chronology
The Factory (1999)	The Pictou Sessions (2000)	Seven Nations (2000)

The Pictou Sessions is an album released by Seven Nations in 2000. Many of its tracks would be re-released on their follow-up self-titled album.

== Track listing ==
1. "The King of Oblivion" (called "King of Oblivion" on "Seven Nations")
2. "Seeds of Life"
3. "Fiddle Set" (called "Jig in E Minor" on "Seven Nations")
4. "Scream"
5. "The Surprise Ceilidh Band Set"
6. "God"
7. "O'er the Moor and Among the Heather"
8. "All You People"
9. "Skyezinha / The Egret"
10. "A Rare Auld Time"
11. "Pipe Set" (called "The Pipe Set" on "Seven Nations")
12. "Trains"
