= Thanks for Waiting =

Studio album by Seven Nations
- Studio: Moriath Recording Studios Orlando, FL
- Genre: Pop, Rock, International, Celtic Rock, Celtic, Celtic Fusion
- Length: 53:20
- Label: Moriath Records
- Producer: Randy Burchett

Seven Nations chronology
Clan Na Gael: 10 Years On	Thanks for Waiting

Thanks for Waiting is an album by Seven Nations released in 2005 on Moriath Records. It features a blend of rock and Celtic influences.

== Track listing ==
No.	Title	Length
1.	"Intro"	1:19
2.	"Mama"	3:57
3.	"Ordinary"	3:31
4.	"Miracle"	3:28
5.	"Tradition"	3:32
6.	"Waltz"	4:00
7.	"Sumthin' Sumthin'"	3:48
8.	"Drive"	3:56
9.	"Instrumental"	3:26
10.	"It's Alright"	3:36
11.	"Running Away"	3:56
12.	"Reno"	3:35
13.	"Slow Air"	3:26
14.	"Gun Song"	3:56
15.	"Water's Wide"	3:20
16.	"Outro"	0:50
