= Niagara Purchase =

1781 British-Indigenous treaty in Ontario

- Signed: May 9, 1781
- Location: Fort Niagara, Niagara County, New York, USA
- Signatories: Guy Johnson
- Parties: Great Britain; Mississauga (Ojibwe) Nation

The Niagara Purchase, also known as Treaty 381 or Niagara Treaty of 1781, was an agreement between certain Mississauga peoples and the British crown signed in 1781. It was signed during the American Revolutionary War with the intention to create a permanent place of refuge for fleeing United Empire Loyalists. It was one of the first land acquisitions by the British Empire in Ontario that would eventually become Upper Canada ten years later. Within the acquired land Butlersburg, later renamed to Newark, was established the same year. Newark later became the first capital of Upper Canada in 1791.

Under this agreement, the Mississaugas "grant, bargain, sell, release and confirm to our said Sovereign Lord King George the third" a tract of land bordered on the north by Lake Ontario, on the south by Lake Erie, and on the east by the Niagara River and extending six-and-a-half kilometres to the west. The Mississaugas accepted 300 suits of clothing as payment.

== Background ==
The land that was acquired by the Niagara Purchase was, at the time of signing, controlled by the Anishinaabe and primarily the Mississaugas. Prior to the 1650s, it was the territory of the Attawandaron before they were wiped out by the Haudenosaunee Confederacy during the Beaver Wars. The Niagara Purchase was preceded by the Royal Proclamation of 1763 which established Indigenous sovereignty in relation to the British Crown, and the Treaty of Fort Niagara in 1764 which informally established a British presence on the both sides of the Niagara River. In particular, the 1764 treaty established that British would have access to the Niagara River and up to two miles inland on each side which allowed for unimpeded access to Fort Niagara.

The purchase was prompted by an influx of American refugees, slaves, and former soldiers loyal to the Crown, such as those from Butler's Rangers, fleeing the newly independent American Republic.

== Text ==
We have now been summoned to attend at this place to make and perfect a cession of the same, and of such other lands, as have been required by Colonel Johnson to be ceded to the King [...] the said Indians have four ourselves, Heirs and Successors, granted, bargained, sold, released and confirmed, and by these presents do grant, bargain, sell, release and confirm to our said Sovereign Lord King George the third, All that certain Tract of land situated on the West side of the said Strait or River, leading from Lake Erie to Lake Ontario, Beginning at a large white oak tree, forked six feet from the ground, on the bank of the said Lake Ontario, at the distance of four English miles measured in a straight line, from the West side of the bank of the said Straight, opposite to the Fort Niagara and extending from thence by a Southerly course to the Chipeweigh River, at the distance of four miles on a direct line from where the said River falls into the said strait about the great Fall of Niagara. or such a line as will pass at four miles West of the said Fall in its course to the said River and running from thence by a Southeasterly course to the Northern Bank of Lake Erie at the distance of four miles on a straight line, Westerly from the Post called Fort Erie, thence Easterly along the said Lake by the said Post, and Northerly up the West side of the said strait to the said lake Ontario, thence Westerly to the place of beginning; together with all the hereditaments and appurtenances to the same belonging or in anywise appertaining, and also all our estate Right, Title, property, possession, claim or demand in law or equity in or to the same or any part thereof. To released and confirmed and aforesaid with the hereditaments and appurtenances thereunto belonging unto our said Sovereign Lord King George the Third. His heirs and successors and to and for his and their own proper use & behoof forever. – In Witness whereof we the Chiefs of the said Chipeweighs & Missisagas have hereunto set our marks and seals the ninth day of May One thousand seven hundred and eight-one. in the twenty first year of His Majesty's reign.
