= Jocelyne Gros-Louis =

Canadian Huron-Wendat Grand Chief and nonprofit organization founder

Jocelyne Gros-Louis, (also known by her Huron-Wendat name, Lahontiach, meaning "The pioneer") was Grand Chief of the Huron-Wendat Nation in Wendake from 1992 to 1994. She founded Le Centre d'amitié autochtone de Québec (CAAQ) and was a founder member of the Corporation du Buisson. She was the first woman to lead an Indigenous nation in Canada.

== Education ==
In 1961, Gros-Louis gained a diploma in maths from the Académie Saint-Louis followed by a diploma in science in 1962, from the Institut Saint-Louis de France.

== Career ==
In 1979, Gros-Louis was a founder of Le Centre d'amitié autochtone de Québec (CAAQ), the Quebec City Native Friendship Centre, an organization that has been supporting Indigenous people living in the urban environment of Quebec City since then. She is now the director general. She is known for her work in community welfare, urban indigenous care and social infrastructure.

From 1985, Gros-Louis was a founding member and the administrator of the Corporation du Buisson which has provided housing in Loretteville for Indigenous people from across Quebec ever since its inception.

In 1987 Gros-Louis led a legal battle to invalidate a referendum which was aimed at maintaining the exclusion of children of Indigenous women married to non-Indigenous men. The children of Indigenous men married to non-Indigenous women were not excluded from membership of the Huron-Wendat nation. The issue is still live in Wendake.

From 1988 to 1990, she served as president of the Corporation du Festival du Cuir (Leather Festival Corporation), an event held in the former town of Loretteville which is now a district of the City of Quebec. From 1989 Gros-Louis was a founding member and director of the Regroupement Autochone Féminin ( Indigenous Women’s Group).

On 16 August 1992, Gros-Louis won a close election to become the first woman Grand Chief of the Huron-Wendat Nation of Wendake.

She succeeded Max Gros-Louis and served from 1992–1994. She was the first woman to lead a First Nation in Canada. She was succeeded by Max Gros-Louis who served a further two years in his second term. Her tenure helped to pave the way for broader political involvement of Indigenous women in regional councils. During her term she supported the reaching of an agreement between the federal government and the Huron-Wendat Nation regarding the "Quarante arpents” (Forty arpents) case, a landmark indigenous land rights dispute between the Huron-Wendat Nation and the Government of Canada. The agreement was aimed at securing reparations for the government’s illegal sale of those lands. Gros-Louis continued to work at the Friendship Centre until her retirement in 2022.

== Legacy ==
Gros-Louis has a street named after her, rue Chef-Jocelyne-Gros-Louis in Wendake.
