= Live at the Palace Theatre =

Live album by Seven Nations
- Released: 2001

Seven Nations chronology
Seven Nations (2000)	Live at the Palace Theatre (2001)	And Now It's Come to This (2002)

Live at the Palace Theatre is a live album by Seven Nations, released in 2001.

== Track listing ==
1. Piper's Wedding
2. God
3. King of Oblivion
4. This Season
5. Iain's Jig/West Mabou Reel/Itchy Fingers/Clumsy Lover
6. All You People
7. Under the Milky Way
8. O'er the Moor and Among the Heather/Larry/Gail/Martin Rochford's/Cape Breton Symphony's Welcome to the Shetland Islands/Jig in D/Jenny's Chickens
9. Amy's Reel/Kelsey's Wee Reel/A Skyedance Reel/Paddy's Leather Breeches/Malts on the Optics/Kelsae Brig
10. Twelve/The Foxhunter's Waltz
11. Bog a Lochan
12. Big Dog
13. Amazing Grace
14. Our Day Will Come
