= Northwestern Confederacy =

Confederation of Native American tribes in the Great Lakes region

United Indian Nations
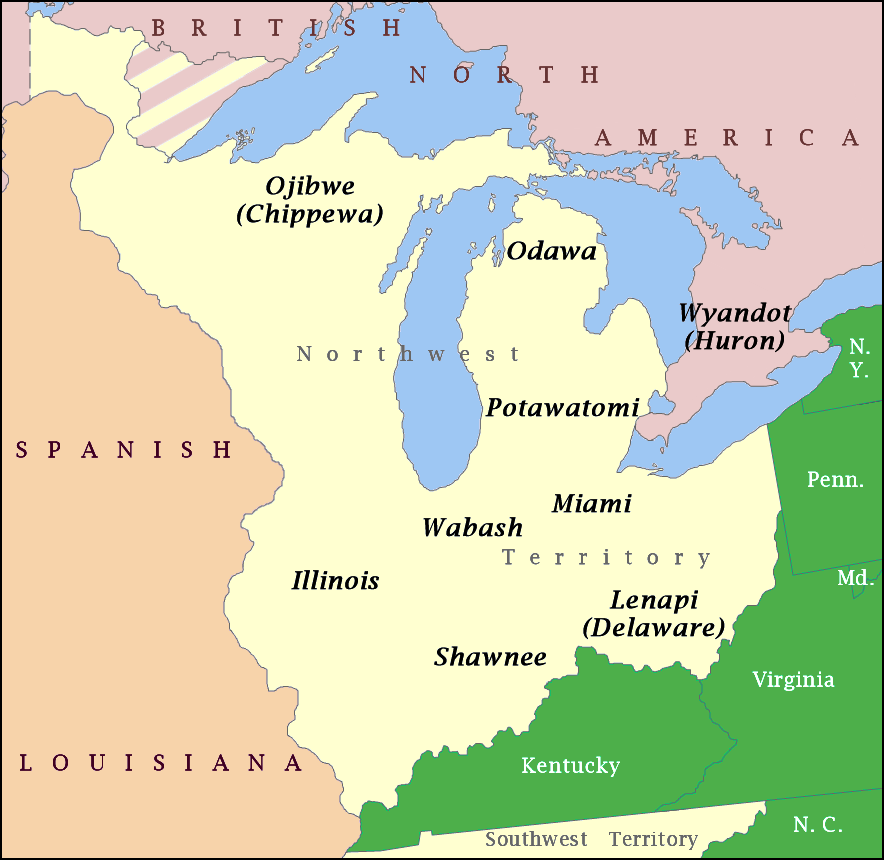
- Native nations of the Northwest Territory
- Other name: United Indian Nations
- Founding leader: Joseph Brant
- Leaders: Blue Jacket; Little Turtle; others
- Dates active: 1783–1795
- Groups: Cherokee; Haudenosaunee (Iroquois); Lenape (Delaware); Miami; Odawa; Ojibwa; Potawatomi; Shawnee; Wabash Confederacy; Wyandot

The Northwestern Confederacy, or Northwestern Indian Confederacy, was a loose confederacy of Native Americans in the Great Lakes region of the United States created after the American Revolutionary War. Formally, the confederacy referred to itself as the United Indian Nations at their Confederate Council. It was known infrequently as the Miami Confederacy since many contemporaneous federal officials overestimated the influence and numerical strength of the Miami tribes based on the size of their principal city, Kekionga.

The confederacy, which had its roots in pan-tribal movements dating to the 1740s, formed in an attempt to resist the expansion of the United States and the encroachment of American settlers into the Northwest Territory after Great Britain ceded the region to the U.S. in the 1783 Treaty of Paris. American expansion resulted in the Northwest Indian War (1785–1795), in which the Confederacy won significant victories over the United States, but concluded with a U.S. victory at the Battle of Fallen Timbers. The Confederacy became fractured and agreed to peace with the United States, but the pan-tribal resistance was later rekindled by Tenskwatawa (known as the Prophet) and his brother, Tecumseh, resulting in the formation of Tecumseh's confederacy.

== Formation ==
The area making up the Ohio Country and the Illinois Country had been contested for over a century, beginning with the Franco-Haudenosaunee Beaver Wars in the 1600s. The Haudenosaunee (Iroquois) competed with local tribes for control of the region and the lucrative fur trade, as did the European powers. The French and Indian War proved to be the largest and final Anglo-French contest for control in North America, ending with a British victory. In the Treaty of Paris which ended the war, the French ceded New France to Britain. That same year, a loose confederation of Native Americans united in Pontiac's War against British rule. The war ended with a peace treaty in 1766, and many of the participating Ohio and Great Lakes nations would later form the Northwestern Confederacy.

Shortly after Pontiac's War, Great Britain negotiated the 1768 Treaty of Fort Stanwix with its Haudenosaunee allies. In the treaty, the Haudenosaunee gave Britain control over the lands south of the Ohio River for settlement by Anglo-American colonists. This legitimized the Haudenosaunee claim to the territory, and created a land rush of settlers from the Thirteen Colonies in the east. The Shawnee responded by demanding money from settlers, and formed alliances with other tribes that inhabited the region to prevent subsequent territorial losses. Early formal ties leading to the formation of the Northwestern Confederacy were made in 1774, in response to the Yellow Creek massacre and Lord Dunmore's War. Commissioners from the Continental Congress met with representatives from the Haudenosaunee, Shawnee, Lenape, Wyandot, and Odawa in 1775 at Fort Pitt, urging them to remain neutral in the growing conflict with Great Britain. In response, Guyasuta urged Pennsylvania and Virginia to resolve their own differences. When Guyasuta asserted that the Haudenosaunee were "the head" of the assembled nations, however, White Eyes declared that the Lenape now lived on land given to them by the Wyandot, and that the Haudenosaunee were not permitted there.

In 1775, the American Revolutionary War broke out, and British forces soon abandoned control over several forts along the American frontier and redeployed those forces to the east, which removed an impediment to illegal American settlement. Native Americans had different reactions to the war, and many saw it as a "white man's war" in which they should play no role. However, numerous Native American peoples saw an opportunity to defend their lands by fighting alongside the British against the land-hungry Americans. In 1776, commissioners at Fort Pitt sent warning of a "General Confederacy of Western Tribes" planning to attack American settlers in their region. The Haudenosaunee (who claimed the western lands) were also divided in response to the war, and extinguished their ceremonial flame of unity in 1777.

In the Treaty of Paris, Britain ceded their North American possessions below the Great Lakes to the United States without consulting their Native allies. According to Joseph Brant, a Mohawk chief who had fought alongside the British, Britain "sold the Indians to Congress." Brant worked to establish a pan-Indian confederacy which could negotiate with the new United States, and delegates from 35 "nations" gathered on the upper Sandusky River in September 1783. The conference was also attended by Sir John Johnson and Alexander McKee, who advocated for a strong confederation and an end to violent raids. The council declared that no agreements with the United States could be made without the consensus of the entire confederation. Congress passed the Proclamation of 1783, which recognized Native American rights to the land. The Indian Affairs Committee of Congress passed the Resolution of October 15, 1783, however, which claimed the land and called on the native nations to withdraw beyond the Great Miami and Mad rivers. (Note: See Report on Indian Affairs (1783) – via Wikisource.)

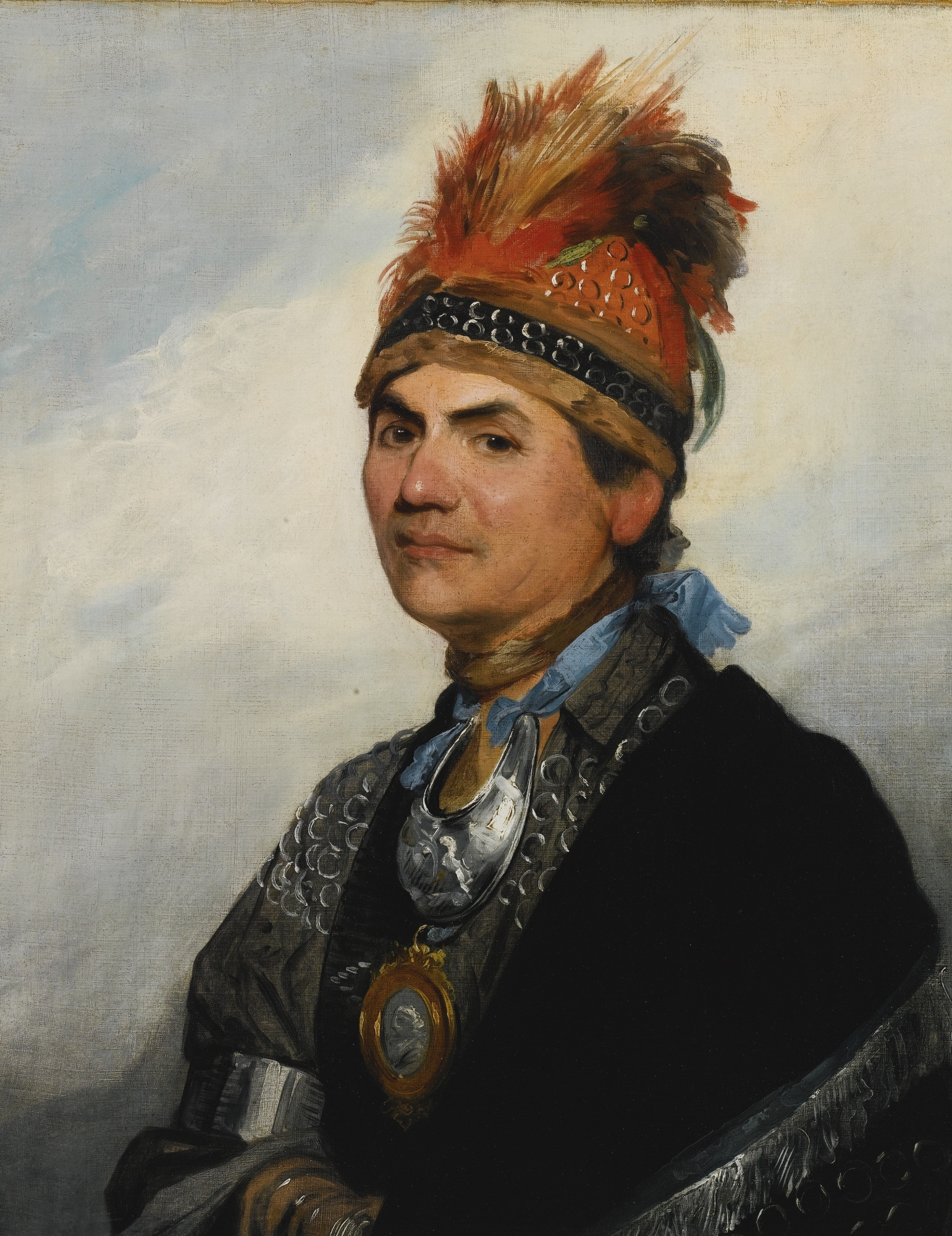
Joseph Brant sat for this portrait by Gilbert Stuart during his 1786 visit to London.

The council reconvened in August 1784 at Niagara-on-the-Lake, where US commissioners were to meet with them. The US commission was delayed, however, and many Native American representatives left before the commission arrived. The commissioners summoned the remaining Haudenosaunee to Fort Stanwix, where the Haudenosaunee nations relinquished their claims to the Ohio lands in the 1784 Treaty of Fort Stanwix. The Haudenosaunee Confederacy refused to ratify the treaty, saying that it had no right to give the United States rights to the land, and the western nations living in the territory rejected the treaty on the same grounds. The US commissioners negotiated the Treaty of Fort McIntosh in January 1785, however, in which a few Native American representatives agreed to grant to the United States most of present-day Ohio. A small US Army regiment under General Josiah Harmar arrived in the territory later that year.

=== Councils and treaties ===
Brant toured Canada, London, and Paris in 1785 to obtain British and French support. A council held that year at Fort Detroit declared that the confederacy would deal jointly with the United States, forbade individual tribes from dealing directly with the United States, and declared the Ohio River as the boundary between their lands and those of the American settlers. Nevertheless, a group of Shawnee, Lenape, and Wyandot agreed to allow U.S. settlement on a tract of land north of the Ohio River in the January 1786 Treaty of Fort Finney. This treaty sparked violence between native inhabitants and U.S. settlers. American trader David Duncan warned that the treaties had "done a Great injury to United States," and tribal leaders warned that they could no longer stop their young men from retaliating.

The Treaty of Fort Finney was rejected by a September 1786 council of 35 native nations (including British representatives) who met at a Wyandot (Huron) village on the upper Sandusky River. Logan's raid into Shawnee territory occurred weeks later, hardening native views of the U.S. That December, Brant returned from Europe to address a council on the Detroit River. The council sent a letter to the U.S. Congress which was signed by eleven native nations, who called themselves "the United Indian Nations, at their Confederate Council." The confederacy assembled again on the Maumee River in the fall of 1787 to consider a reply from the U.S., but adjourned after not receiving one.

Congress appointed Arthur St. Clair as governor of the new Northwest Territory, directing him to make peace with the native peoples. He did not arrive until summer 1788, when he invited the nations to a council at Fort Harmar to negotiate terms by which the United States could purchase lands and avoid war. The sight of Fort Harmar and nearby Marietta, both north of the Ohio River boundary, convinced some that the United States was negotiating from a position of strength. At pre-negotiation meetings, Joseph Brant suggested a compromise to other Native American leaders: allow existing U.S. settlements north of the Ohio River, and draw a new boundary at the mouth of the Muskingum River. Some at the council rejected Brant's compromise. A Wyandot delegation offered a belt of peace to the Miami delegation, who refused to accept it; a Wyandot delegate placed it on the shoulder of Little Turtle, a Miami military leader, who shrugged it off. Brant then sent a letter to St. Clair asking that treaty negotiations be held at a different location; St. Clair refused, and accused Brant of working for the British. Brant then declared that he would boycott negotiations with the United States, and suggested that others do the same. About 200 of the remaining moderates came to Fort Harmar in December and agreed to concessions in the 1789 Treaty of Fort Harmar, which moved the border and designated U.S. sovereignty over native lands. To those who had refused to attend, however, the treaty sanctioned the U.S. appetite for native lands in the region without addressing native concerns.

== Composition ==
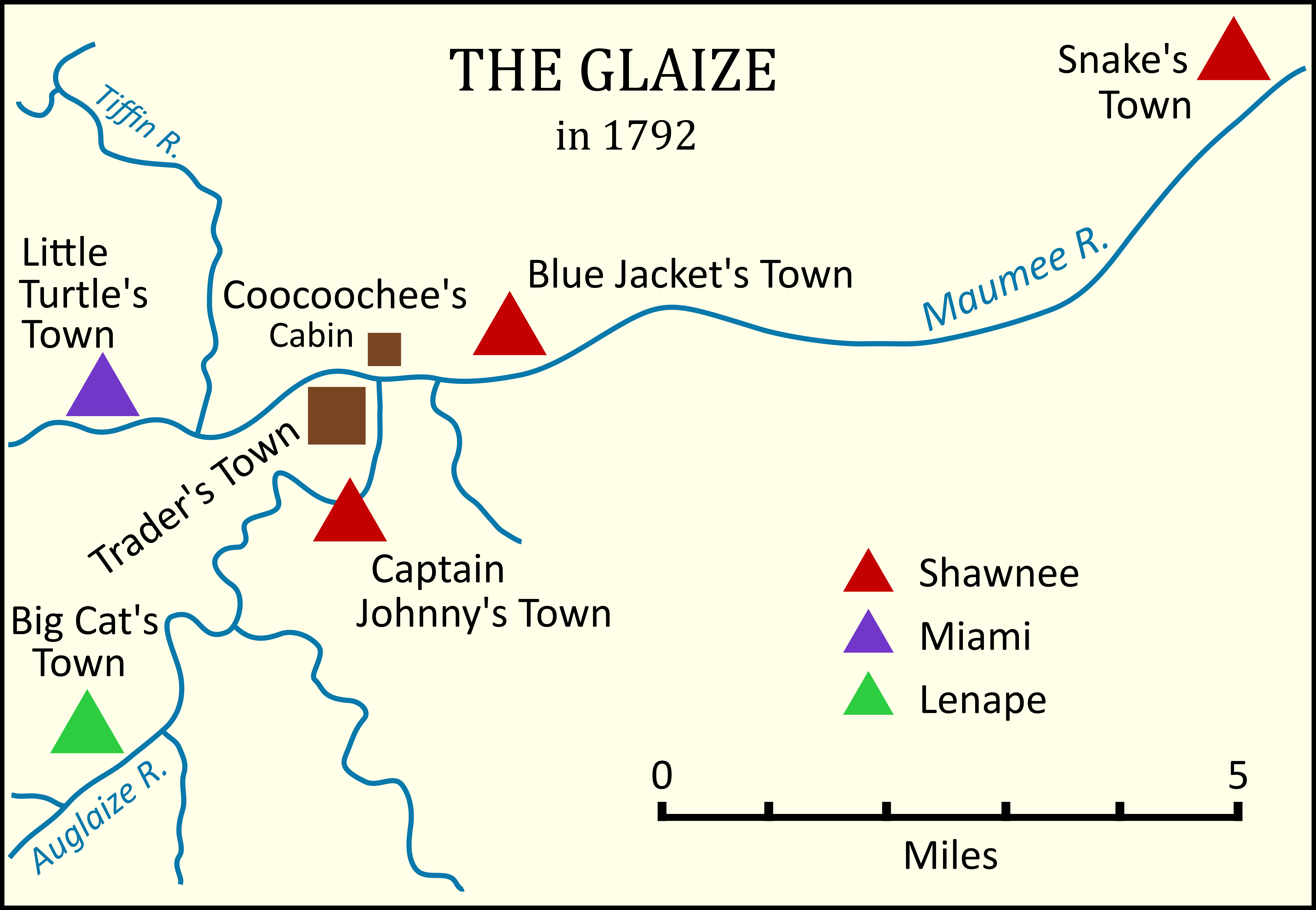
The Glaize in 1792, showing towns of Little Turtle, Big Cat (home of war chief Buckongahelas), Captain Johnny, Blue Jacket, and Captain Snake, as well as Coocoochee's cabin.

The composition of the confederacy changed with time and circumstances, and a number of tribes were involved. Because most nations were not centralized political units at the time, involvement in the confederacy could be decided by a village (or an individual) rather than a nation.

The signatories of the 1786 Detroit letter to Congress were the Haudenosaunee (Iroquois or "Six Nations"), Cherokee, Wyandot, Shawnee, Lenape (Delaware), Odawa, Potawatomi, Twitchee, and the Wabash Confederacy. Joseph Brant signed the letter as an individual. Due to their residence in (or near) the Ohio Country, the confederacy mainly comprised the following tribes:

- The Wyandot (or Huron), the confederacy's honorary sponsors, hosted the first gathering of native nations at their villages on the upper Sandusky River after the 1783 Treaty of Paris.
- Shawnee
- Lenape (exonym Delaware)
- Miami
- Council of Three Fires (Potawatomi, Odawa, and Ojibwe): their southern families were involved with the Confederacy, but northern and western villages were occupied at the time with a war with the Sioux.
- The Wabash Confederacy (Wea, Piankashaw, and others) allied with the Northwestern Confederacy, until it signed a 1792 treaty with the United States.

The Northwestern Confederacy also received support from more-distant nations, including:

- Sauk and Meskwaki
- The Haudenosaunee (the Seneca, Cayuga, Onondaga, Oneida, Mohawk and Tuscarora, and smaller groups including the Tutelo and Nanticoke)
- Members of the Seven Nations of Canada (Algonquin, Nipissing, Abenaki, and Wendat)
- The Illini Confederacy (Kaskaskia, Cahokia, Peoria and others)
- Mingo (trans-Appalachian Cayuga and Seneca splinter groups)
- Menominee
- Kickapoo

The confederacy was periodically supported by communities and warriors from west of the Mississippi River and south of the Ohio River, including the Dakota, Chickamauga Cherokee and Upper Creek.

By 1790 the Northwestern Confederacy was broadly divided into three large divisions. The Haudenosaunee formed a moderate camp who advocated diplomacy with the United States. The Three Fires advocated resistance, but were farther removed from the immediate threat of U.S. invasion. The Miami, Shawnee, and Kickapoo were immediately threatened by U.S. settlements, and pushed for a hard line against U.S. encroachments.

== War with the United States ==
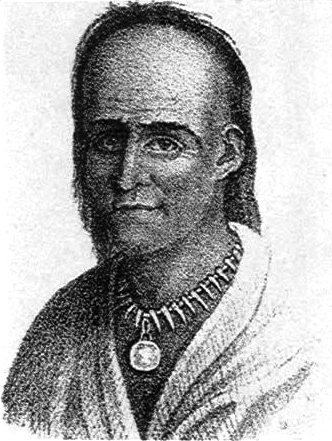
Little Turtle, a Miami war chief who opposed concessions to the United States

In 1790, General Harmar led an expedition to subdue the native confederacy, marching north from Fort Washington to Kekionga. His forces were defeated in what was, at the time, the largest Native American victory against the U.S. The victory emboldened the confederacy. Because they were both present at Kekionga when it was attacked, it was the first military operation shared by Little Turtle and Shawnee leader Blue Jacket.

The following year, determined to defeat the confederacy, St. Clair led a new expedition on the same route. At the time, the confederacy was in Detroit considering terms of peace to present to the United States; but when it was alerted to the new campaign it readied for war. The confederacy ambushed and quickly overwhelmed St. Clair in camp, and St. Clair's defeat remains one of the worst defeats in the history of the U.S. Army.

After this decisive military victory, U.S. president George Washington sent peace emissaries to the confederacy. The first emissary was Major Alexander Truman; he and his servant, William Lynch, were killed before they arrived. A similar mission in May 1792 ended when Colonel John Hardin and his servant, Freeman, were mistaken for spies and killed on the site of modern Hardin, Ohio. A U.S. delegation led by Rufus Putnam and John Hamtramck, with assistance from Little Turtle's son-in-law William Wells, negotiated a treaty with the tribes of the Wabash Confederacy later that year. According to Henry Knox, the treaty weakened the Northwestern Confederacy by 800 warriors.

The confederacy continued to debate whether to continue the war or sue for peace while they had the advantage, and a council of several nations met at the confluence of the Auglaize and Maumee Rivers in September 1792. Alexander McKee, representing British interests, arrived late in the month. For a week in October, pro-war factions (especially Simon Girty, the Shawnee, and the Miami) debated moderate factions—particularly the Haudenosaunee, represented by Cornplanter and Red Jacket. The council agreed that the Ohio River must remain the boundary of the United States, that the forts in the Ohio Country must be destroyed, and that they would meet with the United States at the lower Sandusky River in the spring of 1793. Although the U.S. received the council's demands with indignation, Knox agreed to send treaty commissioners Benjamin Lincoln, Timothy Pickering and Beverley Randolph to the 1793 council and suspend offensive operations until that time.

At the spring 1793 council, a disagreement arose between the Shawnee and the Haudenosaunee. The Shawnee and Delaware insisted that the U.S. recognize the 1768 Fort Stanwix treaty between the Six Nations and Great Britain, which set the Ohio River as a boundary. Joseph Brant countered that the Six Nations had nothing to gain from this demand, and refused to concede. The U.S. commissioners argued that it would be too expensive to move white settlers who had already established homesteads north of the Ohio River. The council (without the Six Nations) sent a declaration to the U.S. commissioners on 13 August contesting U.S. claims to any lands above the Ohio, since they were based on treaties made with nations that did not live there, and with money which was worthless to the native tribes. The council proposed that the U.S. relocate white settlers with the money that would have been used to buy native lands and pay the Legion of the United States. It ended with discord among the confederacy, and Benjamin Lincoln wrote to John Adams that they had failed to secure peace in the northwest.

After the failed peace negotiations, the Legion of the United States under General Anthony Wayne mobilized for yet another march north. The legion was better trained and equipped than previous U.S. expeditions, and Wayne had a methodical plan to build supply forts along the way to protect his supply chain. The confederacy was divided in its response to Wayne, with some leaders recommending that it negotiate terms of peace rather than engage in battle. The perceived cracks in the confederacy concerned the British, who sent reinforcements to Fort Miami on the Maumee River. A large, combined confederacy force attacked Fort Recovery, inflicting heavy casualties and disrupting the legion's supply lines; however, it also exposed lingering inter-tribal conflicts and strategic differences.

On 20 August 1794, the legion defeated a combined native force at the Battle of Fallen Timbers and destroyed several Indian villages. The commander of nearby Fort Miami, Major William Campbell, prepared for a fight, but refused to shelter the native warriors, to give the Americans no excuse for starting a conflict. Wayne finally arrived in Kekionga and selected the site for Fort Wayne, a new U.S. stronghold, on 17 September 1794.

== End of the confederacy ==
The following year, the Northwestern Confederacy negotiated the Treaty of Greenville with the United States. Utilizing St. Clair's defeat and Fort Recovery as a reference point, the treaty forced the northwest Native American tribes to cede southern and eastern Ohio and tracts of land around forts and settlements in Illinois Country; to recognize the United States as the ruling power in the Old Northwest, and to surrender ten chiefs as hostages until all American prisoners were returned. The Northwestern Confederacy ceased to function as an entity, and many of its leaders pledged peace with the United States. A new pan-Indian movement, led by Tecumseh, formed a decade later. According to historian William Hogeland, the Northwestern Confederacy was the "high-water mark in resistance to white expansion."

== See also ==
- Cherokee–American wars
- Indian barrier state
- Indian Reserve (1763)
- Western theater of the American Revolutionary War

== Sources ==
- Allen, Robert S (1992). His Majesty's Indian Allies: British Indian Policy in the Defense of Canada. Toronto: Dundurn. ISBN 1-55002-184-2.
- Calloway, Colin Gordon (2015). The Victory with No Name: the Native American Defeat of the First American Army. Oxford: Oxford University Press. ISBN 978-01993-8799-1.
- Calloway, Colin Gordon (2018). The Indian World of George Washington. New York: Oxford University Press. ISBN 9780190652166. LCCN 2017028686.
- Dowd, Gregory Evans (1992). A Spirited Resistance: The North American Indian Struggle for Unity, 1745–1815. Baltimore: Johns Hopkins University Press. ISBN 0-8018-4609-9.
- Hagen, Ronald E., Catspaw: The Girty, McKee, and Elliott Families, and Indian Negotiations on the American Frontier 1710-1778. First edition, Coneault Lake, PA: Page Publishing, 2024. ISBN 9798895530122
- Hagen, Ronald E. Catspaw Confederacy: The Girty, McKee, and Elliott Families and Indian Negotiations on the American Frontier 1778-1818. First edition, Coneault Lake, PA: Page Publishing, 2025. ISBN 979-8-89922-319-8
- Hogeland, William (2017). Autumn of the Black Snake. New York: Farrar, Straus and Giroux. ISBN 9780374107345. LCCN 2016052193.
- McDonnell, Michael A (2015). Master of Empire. Great Lakes Indians and the Making of America. New York: Farrar, Straus and Giroux. ISBN 978-0374714185.
- Sugden, John (2000), Blue Jacket: Warrior of the Shawnees, Lincoln: University of Nebraska Press, ISBN 0-8032-4288-3
- Sword, Wiley (1985). President Washington's Indian War: The Struggle for the Old Northwest, 1790-1795. Norman and London: University of Oklahoma Press. ISBN 0-8061-1864-4.
- Tanner, Helen Hornbeck, ed. (1987). Atlas of Great Lakes Indian History. Norman: University of Oklahoma Press. ISBN 0-8061-2056-8.
- Tanner, Helen Hornbeck (Winter 1978). "The Glaize in 1792: A Composite Indian Community". Ethnohistory. 25 (1): 15–39. doi:10.2307/481163. JSTOR 481163.
- Van Every, Dale (2008) [1963]. Ark of Empire: The American Frontier: 1784-1803 (The Frontier People of America) (Kindle ed.). New York: Morrow – via Endeavour Media.
- White, Richard (1991). The Middle Ground: Indians, Empires, and Republics in the Great Lakes Region, 1650–1815. Cambridge University Press. ISBN 0-521-42460-7.
