= Max Gros-Louis =

Canadian politician (1931–2020)

- Oné Onti
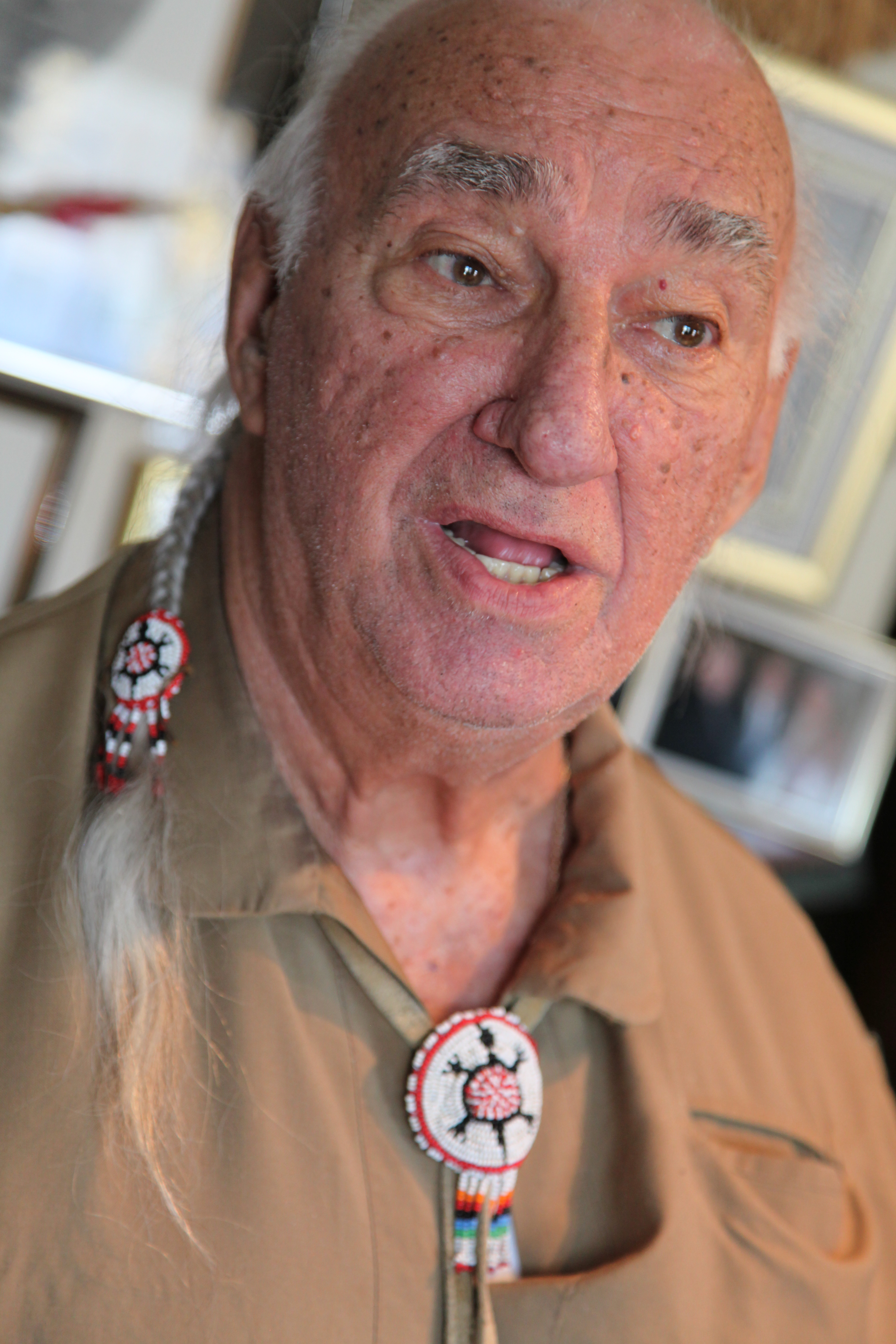
- Max Gros-Louis in 2011

Grand Chief of the Huron-Wendat First Nation
- In office 1964–1984
- In office 1994–1996
- In office 2004–2008

Personal details
- Born: Magella Gros-Louis; August 6, 1931 Wendake, Quebec
- Died: November 14, 2020 (aged 89) Quebec City, Quebec

Magella Gros-Louis OC OQ (6 August 1931 – 14 November 2020), known as Max Gros-Louis or Oné Onti, was a Canadian politician and businessman in Quebec. For many years, he was Grand Chief of the Huron-Wendat First Nation. He founded and directed various organizations, which are dedicated to the culture and rights of the First Nations People in Canada.

== Early life ==
Gros-Louis was born on 6 August 1931, in Wendake, Quebec, which was then known as Huron Village Indian Reservation. He was the son of Cecile Talbot and Gerard Gros-Louis. Gerard Gros-Louis served for 16 years as vice-chief of the Huron-Wendat First Nation and the family had resided in Huron since Max Gros-Louis' great-grandfather Nicolas moved there with the Huron from L'Ancienne-Lorette, Quebec. Gros-Louis attended school in Loretteville, but left at age 16. As a youth Gros-Louis received the Wendat name Oné Onti, meaning "paddler".

Gros-Louis initially made a living by hunting, fishing and trapping on the Huron-Wendat First Nation's traditional lands. He later worked as a guide, leading people on similar expeditions. He also worked as a surveyor and as a travelling salesman. He later opened a small shop "Le Huron" where he sold snowshoes, moccasins and other First Nation crafts, and also managed a dance company. In the course of his business he travelled widely to other indigenous communities and this led to his involvement in politics.

== Political career ==
In 1964 he was elected Grand Chief of the Huron-Wendat Nation in Wendake. At this time the reservation measured just 16 hectares (40 acres; 0.062 sq mi) and Gros-Louis negotiated an increase in size to 164 hectares (410 acres). He also negotiated the boundary of the nation's ancestral land with that of the Innu. Between 1965 and 1976 he was successively a founding member, vice president and secretary-treasurer of the Association des Indiens du Québec. Gros-Louis was involved in creating the "Indians of Canada" pavilion at the Expo 67 world's fair in Montreal. In 1970 he became the Quebec representative to the National Indian Brotherhood.

Gros-Louis has written an autobiography titled First Among the Huron, published in 1973. In 1983 Gros-Louis represented First Nations Quebecers at federal constitutional conferences on aboriginal law. As Chief, he instituted a program to found businesses and create employment in his community. His first period as chief ended in 1984 but three years later he returned to the role. In 1992, he lost to Jocelyne Gros-Louis who became the first woman Grand Chief. In 1994, he regained the role. Gros-Louis was Director and Vice Chief of the Assembly of First Nations for ten years.

Gros-Louis was once more elected Grand Chief of the Huron-Wendat Nation in 2004, and remained in that position until 2008, when he was defeated by Konrad Sioui. During his time as chief he worked to increase the size of the nation's territory, improve its international standing and to highlight maltreatment of indigenous people. During his political career he served as national vice-chief of the Assembly of First Nations, vice-chief of the North American Assembly of First Nations and vice-chief of the World Assembly of First Nations.

== Later life ==
In 2010 Gros-Louis was involved in a controversy when he accepted a donation for a museum which did not yet exist. In 2012, a book about the life of Gros-Louis, written by Alain Bouchard, Max Gros-Louis Le corbeau de Wendake, was published.

Gros-Louis was awarded as an officer of the National Order of Quebec and in December 2015, he was awarded the Order of Canada with the grade of officer. He also received honours from the Belgian l’Académie Diplomatique de la Paix and from France received the Legion of Honour and the National Order of Merit.

Gros-Louis died on 14 November 2020, in Hôtel-Dieu de Québec, at the age of 89.
