= Seven Nations (album) =

Studio album by Seven Nations
- Released: 2000
- Genre: Celtic rock Alternative rock

Seven Nations chronology
The Pictou Sessions (2000)	Seven Nations (2000)	Live at the Palace Theatre (2001)

Professional ratings
Review scores
Source	Rating
AllMusic	1.5/5 stars

Seven Nations is an eponymous album released by Celtic rock band Seven Nations in 2000. It shares many of the same tracks as the band's previous release, The Pictou Sessions, and can be seen as an update of that album. It also functions as a greatest hits package, as it includes many of singer Kirk McLeod's compositions from previous releases, newly arranged for the band's revised lineup. It also contains the recording of "Twelve" from The Factory by the same lineup of the band, which was as follows:

Kirk McLeod: lead vocals, twelve string acoustic guitar, electric guitars, piano
Struby: bass guitars, vocals
Ashton Geoghagan: drums, vocals
Scott Long: highland bagpipes, electronic bagpipes, vocals
Dan Stacey: fiddle, vocals

This album was the last to feature Geoghagan, who was replaced by Christian "Crisco" Miceli.

== Track listing ==
1. "Big Dog"
2. "All You People"
3. "Under the Milky Way"
4. "O'er the Moor and Among the Heather"
5. "Twelve"
6. "King of Oblivion"
7. "Jig in E Minor"
8. "Scream"
9. "The Surprise Ceilidh Band Set"
10. "Seeds of Life"
11. "God"
12. "The Pipe Set"
13. "Trains"

For the "Seven Nations" album, "Skyezinha / The Egret" and "A Rare Auld Time" were dropped in favor of "Big Dog," "Under the Milky Way," and "Twelve." All songs that had appeared on the band's first three albums were newly recorded, and the only recording on these two albums that can be found elsewhere is "Twelve," which was taken from The Factory.
