= Old Ground =

Studio album by Seven Nations
- Released: 1996
- Recorded: Quad Studios, NYC; except "Scream", "God", "Green" and "Old Ground", recorded at Pilot Studios, NYC
- Label: Universal South Records
- Producer: Seven Nations and Grant Austin

Seven Nations chronology
Rain and Thunder (1994)	Old Ground (1996)	Big Dog (1996)

Old Ground is an album released by Seven Nations, at that time known as Clan na Gael, in 1996.

== Track listing ==
1. Colonel Fraser/The Big Parcel/Elzik's Farewell (3:34)
2. No Reason (4:06)
3. The Pound a Week Rise (4:42)
4. Scream (4:47)
5. Trumpan/Clare Jig/The Gaitha/Fiddlehead (6:22)
6. God (4:10)
7. Canadee-i-o (7:14)
8. Campbell's Farewell to Redcastle/Christo Wraps the Reichstag/The Kilt is My Delight/Maggie's Pancakes (5:05)
9. Green (4:14)
10. Ye Jacobites by Name/The Rights of Man (4:23)
11. Men of Argyll/Old Ground (5:10)
