= Road Kill (Seven Nations album) =

Studio album by Seven Nations
- Released: 1998
- Genre: Celtic Rock

Seven Nations chronology
Big Dog (1996)	Road Kill (1998)	The Factory (1999)

Road Kill is a pair of live albums released by Celtic rock band Seven Nations in 1998. According to the band, the discs were meant to portray the band's live act realistically, and to preserve "the intensity and energy that make our concerts so much fun both for us and our audiences." The band's lineup at the time was as follows:

Kirk McLeod: vocals, guitars, keyboards, highland bagpipes
Struby: bass guitar, vocals
Ashton Geoghagan: drums, percussion
Neil Anderson: highland and uilleann bagpipes, Scottish smallpipes

The Road Kill albums were the last Seven Nations releases before the departure of primary bagpipe player Neil Anderson, who had been a member of the band since its inception and was largely responsible for the band's Celtic influences (Anderson sang lead vocals on many traditional Celtic songs the band performed, such as "Whiskey in the Jar" and "The Pound a Week Rise," whereas McLeod would typically sing original compositions). They were also the last two of Seven Nations' independently released albums, all of which are now out of print. However, a cassette version of Road Kill Volume II is still in stock on the band's web site. Digital copies may be obtained from online sites.

== Road Kill Volume I ==
According to the disc's liner notes, the first volume was recorded by Shawn Ruby at Seven Nations concerts spanning fourteen states and three countries, and was produced by Kirk McLeod, the band's singer and guitarist. The first disc contains the following tracks:

1. "Crooked Jack"
2. "Under the Milky Way"
3. "The Conundrum"
4. "No Reason"
5. "Whiskey in the Jar"
6. "Big Dog / Trip to Pakistan"
7. "The Pound a Week Rise"
8. "The Gravel Walk / Andy Renwick's Ferret / Our Day Will Come / Clumsy Lover"
9. "Scotland the Brave / Dixie"

== Road Kill Volume II ==
The second disc contains the following tracks:

1. "The High Level"
2. "Scream"
3. "God (Up to Me)"
4. "Ye Jacobites by Name / The Rights of Man"
5. "Lannigan's Ball"
6. "Bring Back the Sign / The Un-Reel"
7. "Blackleg Miner / Mairi Anne MacInnes"
8. "Johnny Cope"
9. "Trip to Jerusalem"
10. "Campbell's Farewell to Redcastle / Christo Wraps the Reichstag / The Kilt Is My Delight / The Little Cascade / Maggie's Pancakes"
