= Big Dog (album) =

Studio album by Seven Nations
- Released: January 1, 1997
- Recorded: Pilot Studios, NYC
- Genre: Celtic rock
- Label: Moriath Records
- Producer: Seven Nations

Seven Nations chronology
Old Ground (1995)	Big Dog (1997)	Road Kill (1998)

Big Dog is an album by Seven Nations, released on January 1, 1997, on their own label, Moriath Records.

== Track listing ==
No.	Title	Length
1.	"Under the Milky Way"	5:17
2.	"Crooked Jack"	4:27
3.	"The Mountains of Pomeroy/Garrett Barry's Snug in a Blanket/Iain's Jig/Clumsy Lover/Itchy Fingers"	6:31
4.	"Finish Line"	3:57
5.	"Our Day Will Come"	4:06
6.	"Johnny Cope / Fermoy Lasses / Jerusalem Rap"	6:33
7.	"Blackleg Miner / Mairi Anne Macinnes"	4:59
8.	"The Selling of Waternish"	1:58
9.	"Big Dog / Trip to Pakistan"	5:10
10.	"Finnish Line (Reprise)"	1:28
Total length:		44 min
