= USS Algonquin =

USS Algonquin may refer to the following ships operated by the United States Navy:

- USS Algonquin (1863)
- USS Algonquin (tug), ex El Toro (1891) of Southern Pacific's Morgan Line, commissioned Algonquin on 2 April 1898, renamed Accomac 15 June 1898, YT-18 and YTL-18
- USRC Algonquin (1898), Revenue Cutter Service gunboat ordered into Naval service for Spanish–American War serving 24 March 1898 – 17 August 1898 and again during World War I serving 6 April 1917 – 28 August 1919. Sold 23 September 1931 to Foss Launch and Tug Company, Tacoma, Washington.
- USCGC Algonquin (WPG-75), United States Coast Guard patrol gunboat in commission from October 1934 to April 1947 and ordered into Naval service as part of the Greenland Patrol during World War II.
