= Wabash Confederacy =

17th century Native American confederacy

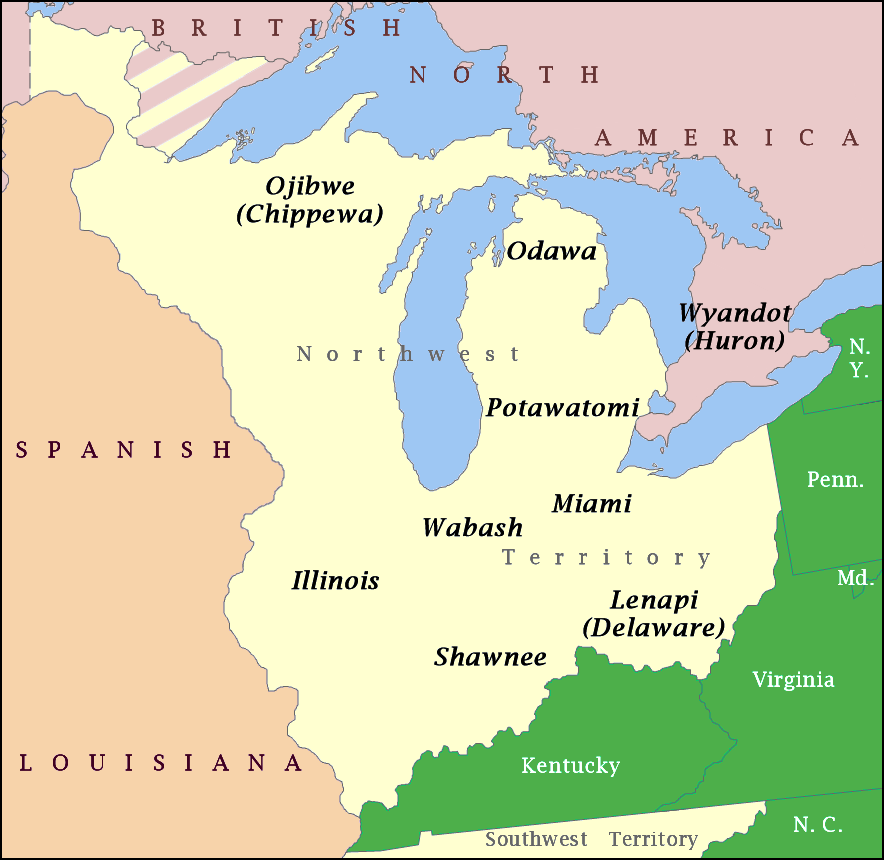
Map of Native tribes of the Northwestern Confederacy in the Northwest Territory—including Ojibwas, Odawas, Potawatomis, Miamis, Wabash, Illinois, Lenapes (Delawares), and Shawnees

The Wabash Confederacy, also referred to as the Wabash Indians or the Wabash tribes, was a number of 18th century Native American villagers in the area of the Wabash River in what are now the U.S. states of Illinois, Indiana, and Ohio. The Wabash Indians were primarily the Miami, Weas and Piankashaws, but also included Kickapoos, Mascoutens, and others. In that time and place, Native American tribes were smaller political units, and the villages along the Wabash were multi-tribal settlements with no centralized government. The confederacy, then, was a loose alliance of influential village leaders (sometimes called headmen or chiefs).

In the 1780s, headmen of the Wabash Confederacy allied themselves with a larger, loose confederacy of Native American leaders in the Ohio Country and Illinois Country known as the Northwestern Confederacy, in order to collectively resist U.S. expansion after the American Revolutionary War. In 1786, a Wyandot messenger named Scotosh warned Congress that the Wabash, Twightwee, and Miami nations would disrupt U.S. surveyors, and Congress promised reprisals if that occurred. This resistance movement culminated with the Northwest Indian War. The alliance with the Western Confederacy ended in 1792 with the Wabash Confederacy signed a treaty with the United States.
