= Virginia Algonquian =

Virginia Algonquian may refer to:

- Virginia Algonquians are an academic grouping of Native American tribes Indigenous to Tsenacommacah
- Virginia Algonquian, a hypothesized language spoken by all the Virginia Algonquians
