= The Factory (album) =

Studio album by Seven Nations
- Released: 1999
- Genre: Celtic rock

Seven Nations chronology
Road Kill (1998)	The Factory (1999)	The Pictou Sessions (2000)

The Factory is an album by Seven Nations, self-released in 1999.

== Track listing ==
1. The Factory Song
2. This Season
3. Soft Gator Girl
4. The Ballad of Calvin Crozier
5. Twelve
6. The Paddy Set
7. N.O.T. (I Want My People Back)
8. Heroes in Tennis Shoes
9. Sweet Orphan
10. Mother Mary
11. Daze of Grace
12. This Season(reprise)
