= Seven Nations (band) =

Celtic rock band

- Origin: Sumter, South Carolina, United States
- Genres: Celtic rock alternative rock (later)
- Years active: 1993–present
- Labels: Independent releases/no major label; Razor & Tie
- Members: Kirk McLeod: Vocals, Keyboard, Guitars, Great Highland Bagpipes; Struby: Vocals, Acoustic and Bass Guitars; Dean Andrews: Drums and Percussion; Jordan Woods-Robinson: Fiddle; Jon Pilatzke: Fiddle; Jose Ortiz: Highland Bagpipes
- Past members: Neil Anderson; Nick Watson; Ashton Geoghagan; Dan Stacey; Scott Long; Brad Green; Julian Lambertson
- Website: www.sevennations.com

Seven Nations is a Celtic rock band that formed in 1993. The name comes from the seven Celtic nations, including Scotland, Ireland, Wales, Brittany, Cornwall, the Isle of Man, and Galicia. The band tours extensively and has played in many diverse venues, from small bars to concert halls.

== Band history ==
Seven Nations started as Clan Na Gael in a barn in Sumter, South Carolina in 1993 according to the band's original history. The band's original members were Kirk McLeod (vocals, keyboard, guitars and Great Highland Bagpipes), Neil Anderson (vocals, Highland and Uilleann bagpipes, Scottish smallpipes, tin whistles and mandolin), Jim Struble (vocals, acoustic and bass guitars) and Nick Watson (vocals, drums and percussion). The band changed its name in 1997 because a Nevada-based folk music group was already operating under the same name.

Watson left the band in 1997 and was replaced by Ashton Geoghagan. Anderson left the band in 1998, and in 1999 Dan Stacey (fiddle, Canadian stepdance) and Scott Long (Highland bagpipes) joined Seven Nations's lineup. Geoghagan left in August 2001 to pursue other interests; he is currently a Paramedic/Captain with Jacksonville Fire Rescue. Geoghagan was replaced by Angelo Christian Miceli in 2001 and remains the drummer today. Watson and Anderson currently play together with former The Bolshoi frontman Trevor Tanner in a new Celtic rock group called Rathkeltair which has done extensive touring up and down the east Coast of the US. Dan Stacey left in December 2007 to pursue a solo career and was replaced by Victor Gagnon. Scott Long left the band shortly after to pursue a career opportunity and was replaced by multi instrumentalist Will MacMorran. In 2005, the original members of Clan Na Gael reunited to produce an album where, in addition to tracks from earlier albums Rain and Thunder, Old Ground and Big Dog, there are six new tracks and two completely original songs recorded in December, 2004. "Clan Na Gael: 10 Years On".They also played four shows live in New York, Pennsylvania, and South Carolina.

The band's current line-up includes Kirk McLeod, Jim "Struby" Struble, Dean Andrews (drums), Jordan Woods-Robinson (fiddle), Jon Pilatzke (fiddle) and Jose Ortiz (bagpipes). The band regularly tours across the US, has appeared on ESPN, CNN World Beat, PBS and CBS, and has sold over 140,000 albums since 1996, without signing to a major label. The band's most successful release to date was And Now It's Come to This, released on Razor & Tie Records in 2002. The album's mainstream rock sound was considered to be a drastic change from the band's traditional style. A recent album, Thanks for Waiting, returns to the acoustic style and does not feature an electric guitar. The band also released a Celtic Rock Tribute to the Cure. Seven Nations latest release is Tales From The Eighth Nation (2014). Kirk McLeod's latest project is KIR (2016), a "new original endeavor from Kirk McLeod combining Gaelic, mouth music and cantaracht with popular music in a way that has never been done before."

The band is currently based in Orlando, Florida.

== Media ==
The band has been in the media numerous times, most notably during the Dewar's Scotch campaign ads, which featured a print campaign in over 20 major magazines, as well as use of the Dewar's tour bus during late 1999 to 2002. Also in the media was use of the song "Big Yellow Bus" off their 2002 album And Now It's Come to This in an episode of a CBS drama, but the episode never aired.

SCETV also did a feature titled "An Evening with Seven Nations", which was filmed on two consecutive evenings at the Newberry Opera House in Newberry, South Carolina. It aired on PBS in 1999 and early 2000 and was also available on VHS.

In the early 2000s, ESPN approached them to create the theme for their Extreme Sports show, which airs internationally.

Perhaps the most successful media exposure, short of the Dewar's Campaign, was during the XIX Winter Olympic Games in Salt Lake City, Utah where they played in the Torch Lighting Ceremony.

== Discography ==
=== Albums ===
- Rain and Thunder (1994)
- Old Ground (1995)
- Big Dog (1996)
- Road Kill (Two Volume Live Set) (1998)
- The Factory (1999)
- The Pictou Sessions (2000)
- Seven Nations (2000)
- Live at the Palace Theatre (2001)
- And Now It's Come to This (2002)
- Christmas EP (2003)
- Christmas EP 2004 (2004)
- Clan Na Gael: 10 Years On (2005)
- Thanks For Waiting (2005)
- A Celtic Rock Tribute to the Cure (2007)
- Time As The Enemy (2008)
- Another Ten Years (2010)
- Tales From The Eighth Nation (2014)
- KIR (2016)

=== Singles ===
- "Wonderful" (2002)

=== Solo albums ===
- Neil Anderson - Revenge of the Antipypr (2001)
- Kirk McLeod - So Piano (2003)
- Dan Stacey - Crank It (2003)
- Scott Long - In and Out the Harbour (2003)
- Victor Gagnon - Maybe Flowers And Six Feet Down (2012)

== Awards and achievements ==
- Performed at the Torch arrival ceremony at the Winter Olympics in Salt Lake City in 2002
- Subject of PBS Special “An Evening with Seven Nations”
- Chosen by Extreme Sports to create the music theme for their theme, which airs internationally
- Featured on CNN in a Worldbeat special airing internationally
- Selected by Dewar’s Scotch for a multi-million dollar profile campaign and sponsorship, which included a national print campaign with exposure in over 20 major magazines
- Seven Nations CD flown on the Space Shuttle Endeavour by Canadian astronaut, Chris Hadfield
- First American band to be asked by the National Trust of Scotland to do a return engagement
- Rolling Stone Presents Showcase and VIP party in San Francisco in 2001
- Performed for the televised opening ceremony of the New York Marathon in late 2001
- National Major-market Hard Rock Café tour in 2001 sevennations.com
- Concert series with the South Carolina Symphony Orchestra
- Annual performance(s) at Irish 2000 Music and Arts Festival, Altamont, NY. One of the largest Irish fests on the East Coast
