= Coocoochee =

Mohawk leader and medicine woman

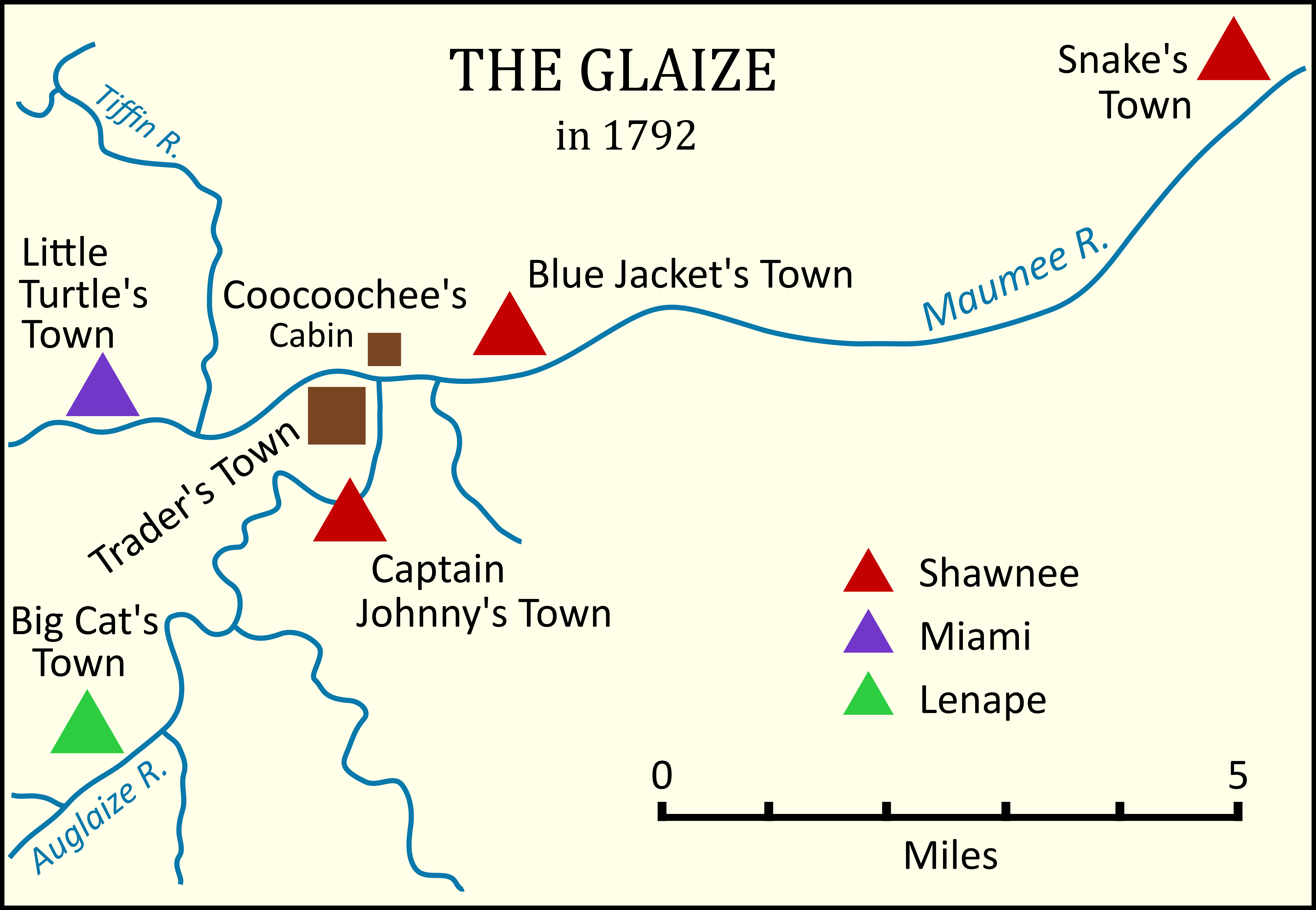
Location of Coocoochee's cabin at the Glaize in 1792

Coocoochee (c. 1740 – after 1800) was a Mohawk leader and medicine woman. She was born in a village near Montreal but lived most of her life in the remote North American Ohio Country among the Shawnee led by the war chief Blue Jacket. She was born into the important Wolf Clan, later marrying a warrior member of the Bear Clan. Her husband Cokundiawsaw was a war chief of the Mohawk.

Among the Shawnee, she was renowned for her acquired skills as a healer with special expertise in preparing and using herbal medicines. She was also revered for her ability to contact the powerful world of spirit; She was renowned as a prophet, and warriors would ask her if their ventures would be successful. If she consulted the spirits and predicted success, and the venture did end up successful, she would be given some of the spoils as a sign of gratitude.

In addition to her role as healer, she was often consulted on military and political matters involving Indian/American relations.

Warfare broke out during Coocoochee's teenage years. Due to the wars—and ongoing attacks and forced removals by Europeans—she and her family, including the two toddler aged children, had to flee their home, and walked 700 miles to central Ohio.

From 1769 to 1777, Coocoochee and her family lived among the Shawnee in Ohio. In Ohio they lived on the west bank of the Scioto River in a town led by Blue Jacket, a Shawnee war chief.

Multiple times throughout her life, she and her family were forced to flee due to encroachment and attacks by American and British colonists. They often were forced to live as refugees. In 1790, her husband was murdered by American soldiers who raided, murdered, and burned Indigenous people's homes under the command of General Josiah Harmar.

Coocoochee advocated for resistance against the attacks, encroachment, and forced removals carried out by Americans and Europeans against Indigenous people. She believed that the Europeans and Americans intended eradicate Indigenous people, and witnessed many of her people - and family - murdered.

== Family ==
Sometime between 1754 and 1763 Coocoochee married a Mohawk war chief named Cokundiawsaw. During this time, before leaving for Ohio, they had four children: one daughter and three sons. Two of her sons were named White Loon and Black Loon.
