= Oswegatchie people =

In 1749, the Sulpician missionary, Abbé Francois Picquet, built a fort where the Oswegatchie River empties into the St. Lawrence River (present-day Ogdensburg, New York). He invited the Iroquois to come to Fort de La Présentation to learn about Catholicism. To settle at La Présentation, families had to agree to live monogamously, convert to Catholicism, give up alcohol and swear allegiance to France. By 1751, 396 Haudenosaunee families, largely Onondaga with some Oneida and Cayuga, had settled in the area between Toniato Creek (now known as Jones Creek, in Thousand Islands National Park) and the Long Sault. They came to be called the Oswegatchie. This was one of the Seven Nations of Canada.

While never allowed as a separate tribal member of the Haudenosaunee Confederacy, the Oswegatchie were considered "nephews" because of their members' family ties to the Six Nations. When the Seven Years' War broke out between France and England, the Oswegatchie fought with the French on numerous raids in the Ohio, Champlain and Mohawk valleys, where they attacked British colonists.

After the British conquered the French in 1760, British soldiers were stationed at La Présentation. They renamed it Fort Oswegatchie. The Oswegatchie who remained there after the conquest swore allegiance to the British. They fought alongside them on raids on the Mohawk Valley against American rebel colonists during the American Revolution.

In 1784, the Oswegatchie surrendered the frontage on the north shore of the St. Lawrence to the British, resettling at what is now Lisbon, New York.

After the end of the Revolutionary War, the British remained at the fort until 1796, and evacuated after the border between Canada and the United States was decided. European-American pioneers from New England and lower New York started arriving in June 1796 and began settling the area. By 1806, United States troops drove the Oswegatchie out of their permanent settlement at Lisbon. Many families resettled at St. Regis (Akwesasne) and other native communities in Canada.
