= Wendake =

- Urban Indian reserve
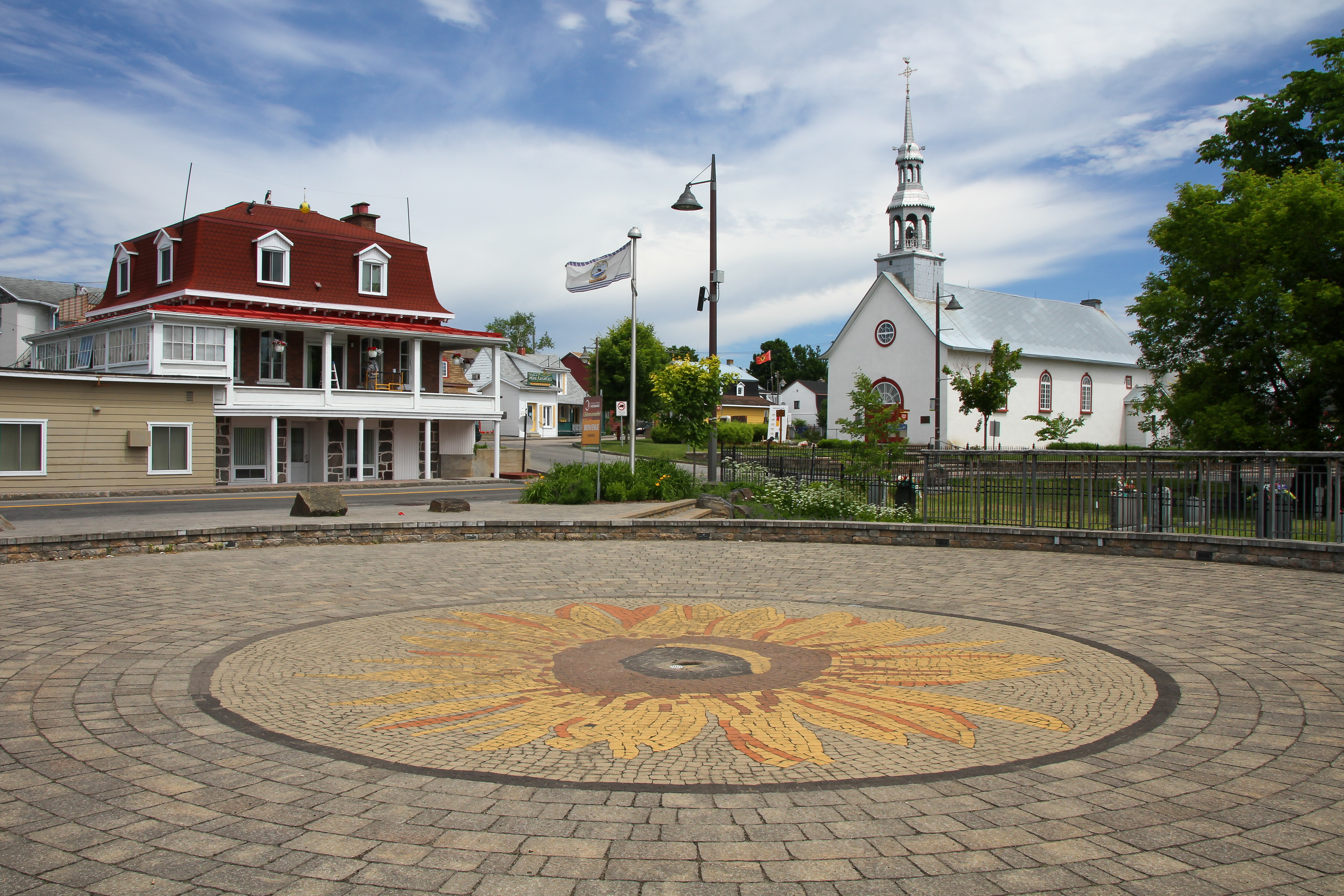
- The Place de la Nation Huronne-Wendat in Wendake

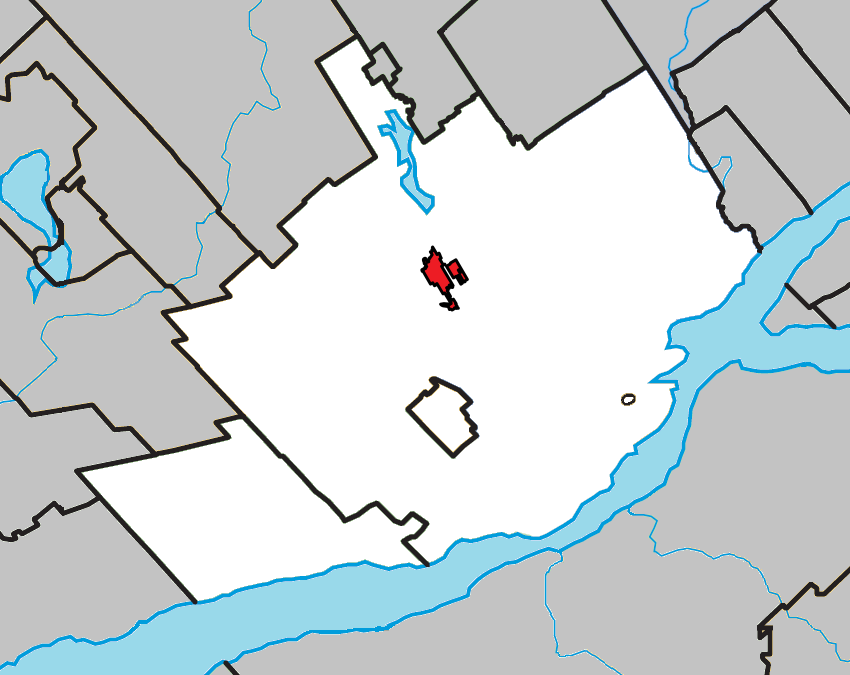
- Location of Wendake within the Quebec equivalent territory

- Location in central Quebec
- Coordinates: 46°51′24″N 71°21′12″W
- Country: Canada
- Province: Quebec
- Equivalent territory: Quebec
- First Nation: Wendat

Government
  - Grand Chief: Rémy Vincent

Area
  - Total: 2.26 km^{2} (0.87 sq mi)

Population (2021)
  - Total: 2,200
- Time zone: UTC−05:00 (EST)
  - Summer (DST): UTC−04:00 (EDT)
- Postal code: G0A 4V0
- Area codes: 418 and 581
- Website: wendake.ca

Wendake (French pronunciation: [wɛndake]) is the current name for two urban reserves, Wendake 7 (46°51′24″N 71°21′12″W) and Wendake 7A, (46°52′13″N 71°21′54″W) of the Wendat Nation in the Canadian province of Quebec. They are enclaves entirely surrounded by the La Haute-Saint-Charles borough of Quebec City, within the former city of Loretteville. One of the Seven Nations of Canada, the settlement was formerly known as Village-des-Hurons ('Huron Village'), and also as (Jeune)-Lorette ('New Lorette').

Since the late 20th century, archeologists have found large 16th-century villages of the Wendat (Huron) in the northern Lake Ontario region, which is where they believe the people coalesced as a distinct group. Later they migrated south and by the early 17th century had settled in their historical territory of Wendake in the Georgian Bay region. The Wendat Confederation was made up of loosely associated tribes who spoke a mutually intelligible Iroquoian language.

== History ==
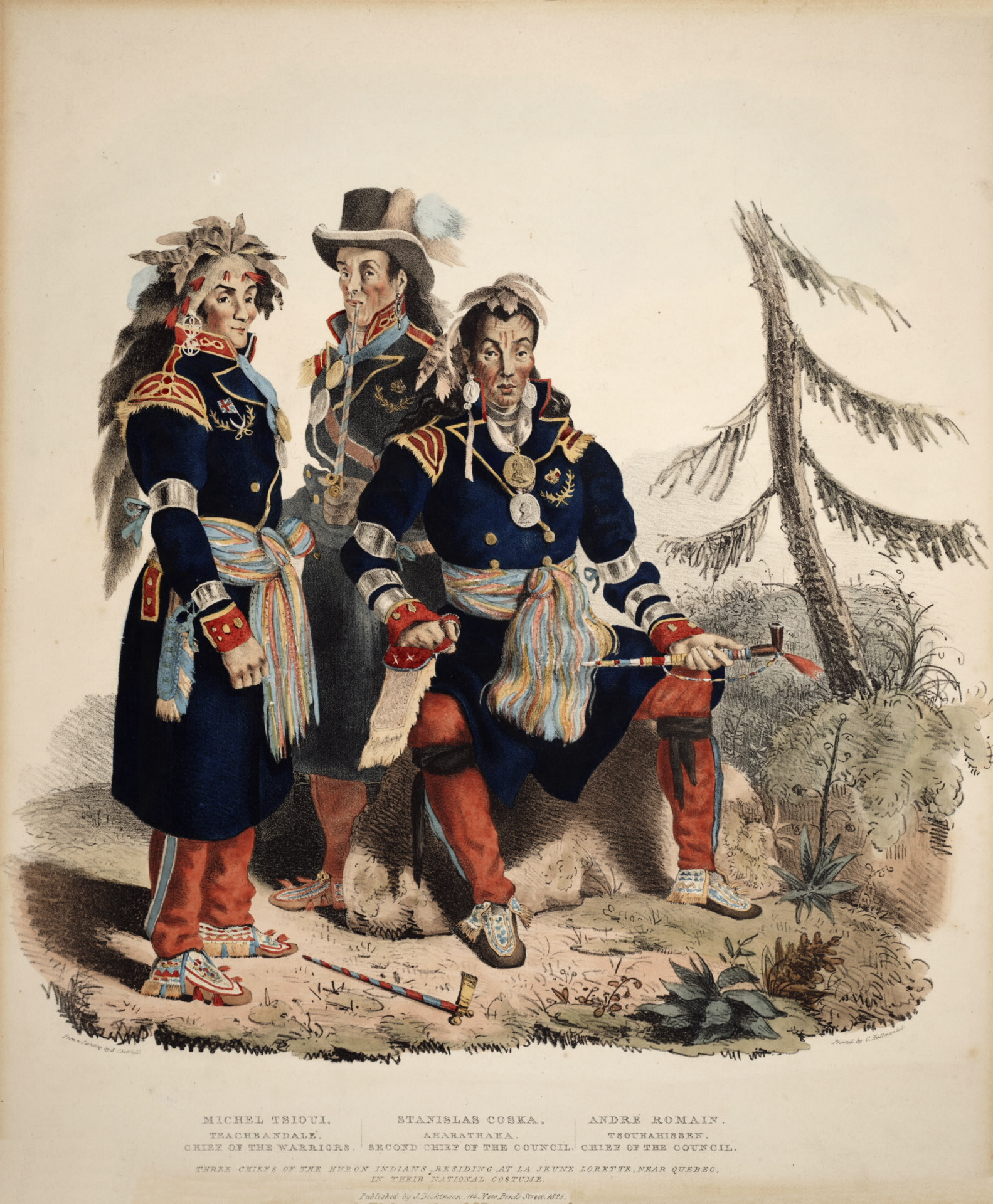
Three Huron-Wyandot chiefs from the Huron reservation (Lorette) now called Wendake in Quebec, Canada in 1825. At far left is Michel Tsioui (Teachendale), war chief. Centre is Stanislas Coska (Aharathaha), second chief of the council. At far right is André Romain (Tsouhahissen), first chief of the council.

Archeologists have excavated 16th-century settlements north of Lake Ontario at the Mantle Site (2005), Aurora Site and Ratcliff Site in Whitchurch-Stouffville, Ontario, all attesting to distinctly Wendat (Huron) occupancy. They have concluded the people coalesced in this area as a distinct group. Later they migrated to the Georgian Bay area, where they encountered Europeans in the 17th century.

Until the middle of the 17th century, the Wendake ancestors occupied a vast territory straddling part of what is now the United States (from Detroit to south-eastern Ontario (Penetanguishene and Midland) and Quebec. They hunted and trapped throughout this territory (mainly in the Laurentian Mountains, between the central section of the Saint-Maurice and the Saguenay rivers).

Between 1634 and 1650, the Wendat Confederation was dismembered; its families, having been gathered into four or five tribes, were dispersed. It is estimated that the Wendat population totalled approximately 20,000 to 30,000 people in 1634. By 1650, only a few hundred individuals remained. Most had been decimated by infectious disease epidemics, to which they had no natural immunity; survivors were attacked by wars, especially by the Haudenosaunee Confederacy, who pushed from the south (present-day New York) trying to control hunting grounds and the fur trade.

Part of the Wendat population had also been integrated into the Haudenosaunee Confederation. The survivors of this tragic period divided into two groups in Canada: the Great-Lake Wyandot and the Huron-Wendat. The latter were the ancestors of the Wendat of Wendake. This marked the beginning of a period of exile for the 300 or so Wendat who remained, an era during which they would occupy as many as six different sites in the province of Quebec. They finally settled for good in the village of Lorette in 1697. First established on Île d'Orléans in 1651, the community moved to Quebec City in 1668. Subsequently, the Wendat temporarily resided in Beauport, Notre Dame de Foy, L'Ancienne-Lorette and then New Lorette in 1673.

As of the 2016 Canadian census the population of the two reserves was 2,135 people and the Wendat Nation has a total of 4,314 registered members, most of which live off reserve. Wendake 7 occupies an area of 133.4 ha (1.334 km^{2}; 0.515 sq mi) and Wendake 7A 244.6 ha (2.446 km^{2}; 0.944 sq mi) for a total of 378 ha (3.78 km^{2}; 1.46 sq mi).

From 1992-1994

As of 2021, the Grand Chief is Rémy Vincent and previous chiefs include Jocelyne Gros-Louis the first woman Grand Chief of a first nation, and Konrad Sioui, who succeeded Max Gros-Louis in 2008.

The Wendat had called their historic homeland Wendake; it was the territory south of Georgian Bay in present-day Simcoe and Grey County counties. The region was informally known as "Huronia" or the Georgian Triangle. A very large 15th-century Wendat settlement (the Mantle Site) has recently been discovered in Whitchurch–Stouffville. Its discovery has added to archeologists and anthropologists believing that the Wendat arose as a people in this area.

Other remnants of the Wendat and Petun peoples formed the Wyandot people and migrated south, to present-day Michigan. Later they were forced west of the Mississippi River to Indian Territory in Kansas and Oklahoma. In the United States, there is one federally recognized Wyandot tribe: the Wyandotte Nation of Oklahoma. The self-identified Wyandot Nation of Kansas and Wyandot Nation of Anderdon in Michigan are not federally recognized. In August 1999, these nations joined the contemporary Wendat Confederacy, pledging to provide mutual aid to each other in a spirit of peace, kinship, and unity.

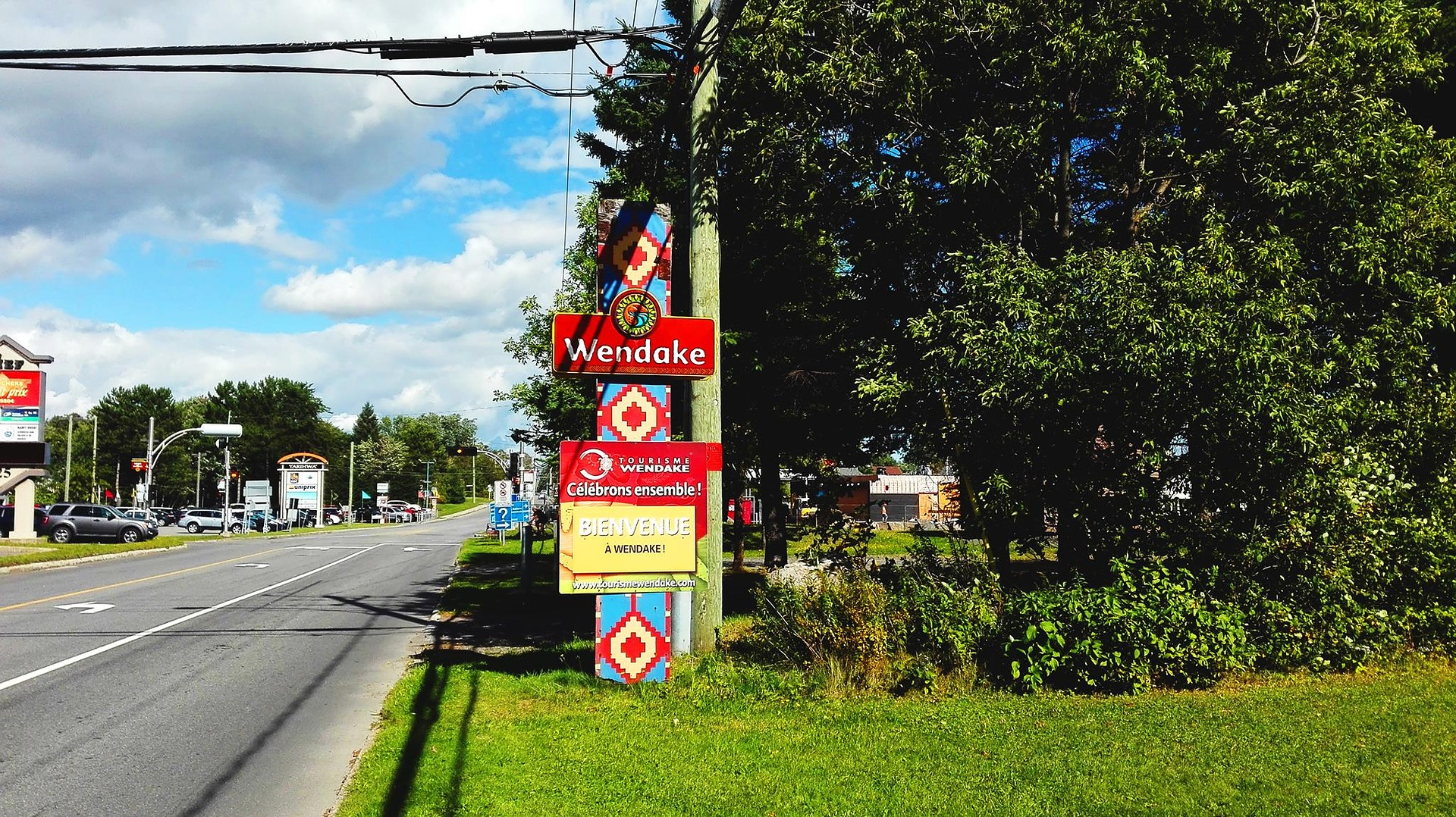
Entrance sign

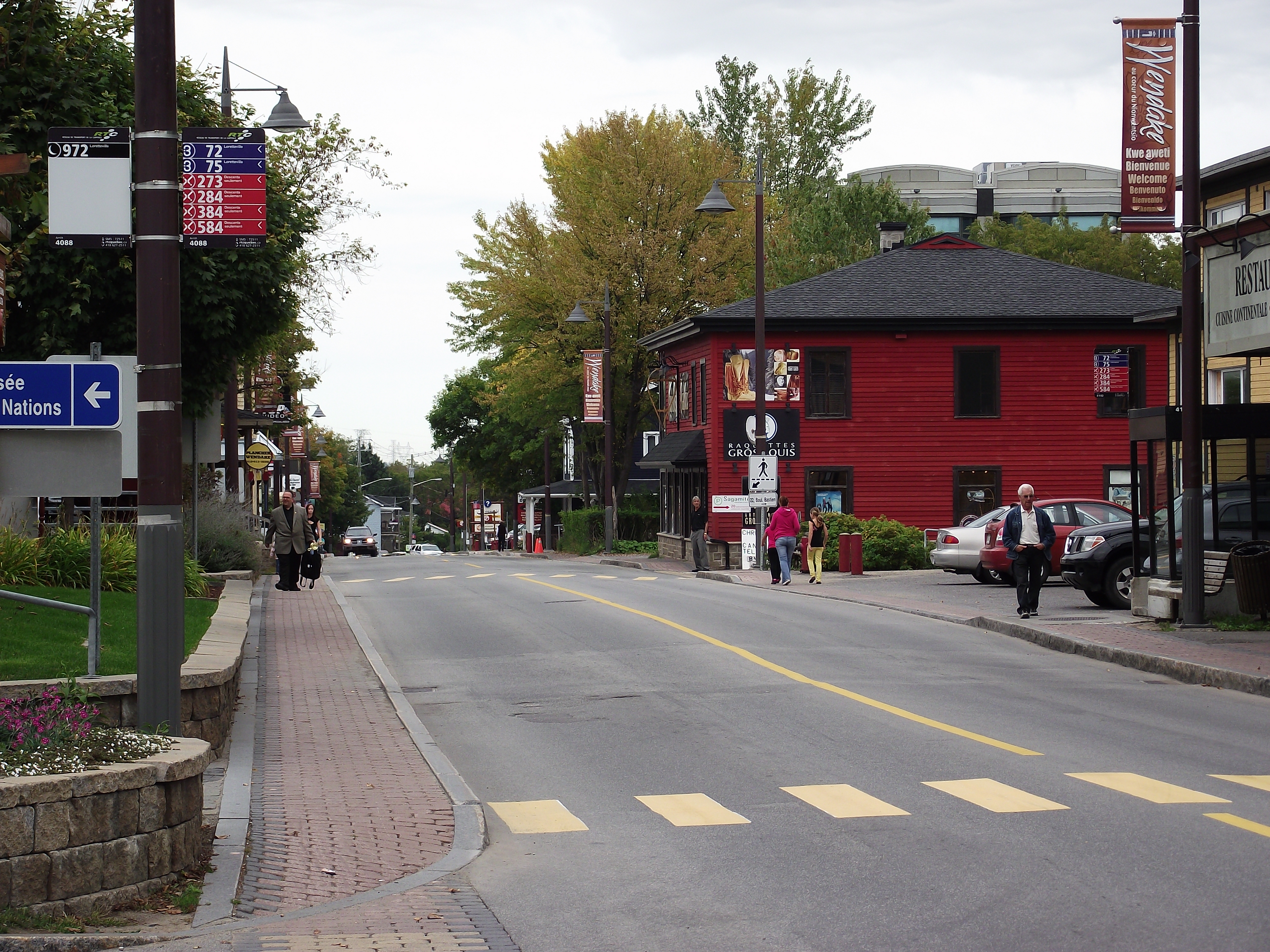
Old Wendake Historic District National Historic Site of Canada
