= Seven Nations of Canada =

Historical First Nations confederacy

- Type: Indigenous confederacy
- Origins: St. Lawrence River area
- Members: Oneida, Onondaga, and Cayuga of Oswegatchie; Mohawk of Akwesasne; Mohawk of Kahnawake; Mohawk and Anishinaabe (Algonquin and Nipissing) of Kanesatake

The Seven Nations of Canada (called Tsiata Nihononhwentsiá꞉ke in the Mohawk language) was a historic confederation of First Nations living in and around the St. Lawrence River valley beginning in the 18th century. They were allied to New France and often included substantial numbers of Roman Catholic converts. During the Seven Years' War (1756–1763), they supported the French against the British. Later, they formed the northern nucleus of the British-led Indigenous alliance that fought the United States in the American Revolutionary War and the War of 1812.

Rather than consisting of seven distinct nationalities, the alliance was a confederation of seven communities or towns. From west to east the communities were as follows:

- Oneida, Onondaga, and Cayuga of Oswegatchie
- Mohawk of Akwesasne
- Mohawk of Kahnawake
- Mohawk and Anishinaabe (Algonquin and Nipissing) of Kanesatake
- Abenaki of Odanak
- Abenaki of Bécancour (now Wôlinak)
- Wendat of Jeune-Lorette (now Wendake)

== History ==
The Canadian historian Jean-Pierre Sawaya has argued that the Indigenous confederacy has existed since the 17th century. He does specialized research in the history of Canada's First Nations and the background to their land claims. The Canadian historian John Alexander Dickinson argues that the federation was created during the Seven Years' War, as the British closed in on the territories along the St. Lawrence River. Dickinson is a specialist in the history of New France and its relations with the First Nations of the northeast. There is little first-hand evidence to support either view. Dickinson argues that the lack of evidence supports the case for a later date.

The Mohawk historian Darren Bonaparte has summarized what is known. After a disastrous war in 1667 when the French attacked Mohawk villages in present-day New York, some Mohawk converted to Christianity and began to relocate to Kahnawake ("near the rapids") on the St, Lawrence River opposite the small village of Montreal. By its name and location by a rapids, Kahnawake recalled the village Caughnawaga (in a variant spelling) in the Mohawk homeland. The first village faded as most of its people moved north. The relation between the Mohawk who stayed in New York and those who migrated was, in Bonaparte's words, "as ambiguous as when they were together", in part because they became differentiated by religious practices.

A federation of First Nations bands formed in settlements in the St. Lawrence River valley. It included those Abenaki, Algonquin, and Wendat who were more accepting of Catholicism. The Abenaki and Algonquin spoke in languages of the major families of Algonquian. The Mohawk, Oneida, Onondaga and Cayuga were Haudenosaunee, and the Wendat spoke another Iroquoian language. The Mohawk of the federation continued to identify as Mohawk, and as relatives of the Mohawk in traditional Haudenosaunee territory.

One of the earliest written references to the Seven Nations was made in the mid-18th century. In 1755, Seven Nations fighters and their French allies had prepared an ambush for the British Army on the portage between Lake George and the Hudson River. One of the Mohawk from Kahnawake saw that Mohawk were marching with the British. He told them to identify themselves; they replied, they were "Mohawks and Five Nations" (the traditional name for the Haudenosaunee Confederacy). Questioned in turn, the Mohawk with the French said, "[W]e are the 7 confederate Indian Nations of Canada." This exchange was recorded in a memoranda book by Daniel Claus, who was working as an Indian agent for William Johnson, commander of the British Indian Department.

From the late 1800s onward, the three Mohawk nations, particularly at Akwesasne, renewed their ties with the Haudenosaunee Confederacy. As a result, those nations are now more closely associated with the Haudenosaunee Six Nations, and identification with the Seven Nations is minimal.

== Religion and culture ==
During the French colonial period and due to influence of Jesuit missionaries, many of these peoples converted to Catholicism, while often keeping elements on their traditional religion and ceremonies. The Jesuits made efforts "to preserve and maintain the Mohawk language (by translating and transcribing scripture, prayers and hymns into Mohawk) and the traditional clan system (by refusing to marry people of the same clan)." The Jesuits did not require that their converts learn a European language (although many did for ease of trading) or assimilate with the outside culture. The Jesuit mission registers in the late 18th and 19th centuries at Akwesasne and other sites continued to record names as Mohawk (or other tribal names), even when a European version was also used.

== Geography ==
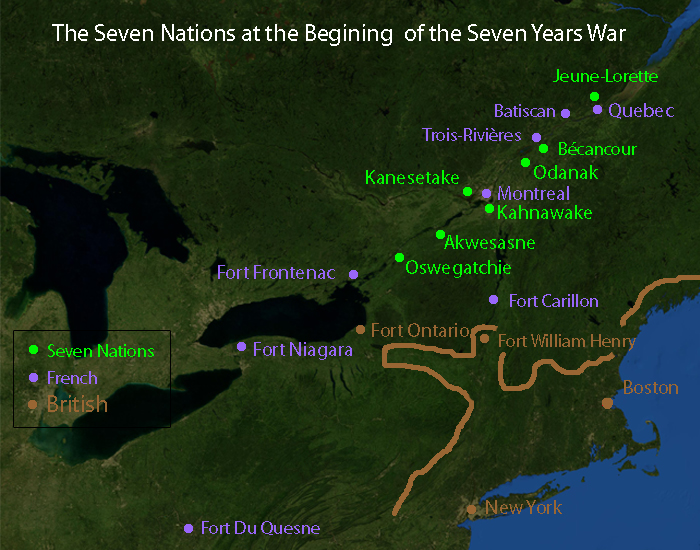
The Seven Nations of Canada on the eve of the Seven Years War

This map shows the Seven Nations on the eve of the Seven Years' War. Native and French communities formed a patchwork along the St. Lawrence River. The French communities were a single political entity. The Native American communities each had its own government, connected with the French by geography and by formal and informal agreements. The majority of the residents in the four western towns were closely related to the Haudenosaunee of the Six Nations — mostly Mohawk (Kanesatake, Kahnawake, and Akwesasne) or Oneida, Onondaga and Cayuga (Oswegatchie). There were also Anishinaabe living at Kanesatake. The eastern towns were populated by the Abenaki (Odanak and Wôlinak in Bécancour) and the Wendat (Jeune-Lorette, now Wendake). A main unifying concern was the relentless encroachment of European-British settlement in New England and New York that had already driven many of them from their ancestral homes.

== Politics ==
When the Seven Nations saw that the French were going to be defeated by the British in the Seven Years' War, they made a treaty of peace with the British, known as the Treaty of Kahnawake (1760). By this, the Seven Nations negotiated free access between Canada and New York, to maintain their important fur trade between Montreal and Albany, New York.

In the 1783 Treaty of Paris following the American Revolutionary War, the British Crown ceded all its territories south of the Great Lakes to the United States (US). As the treaty made no mention of Britian's Native American allies, the US had to negotiate separate peace agreements with each of the nations. The important issues to be settled included not only peace, but also the ownership of vast tracts of land which the United States considered to be under its control by the British cession. By 1789, US officials realized that, in the words of Henry Knox, the Secretary of War, "the Indians are especially tenacious of their lands, and generally do not relinquish their right, excepting on the principle of a specific consideration, expressly given for the purchase of the same." After the United States and the Seven Nations signed a treaty in 1797, its legitimacy was challenged by other Native Americans on the grounds that the signatories were unauthorized to cede land.

The challenge has continued to this day. In relation to another treaty signed in 1836, federal courts in the United States have ruled that they will not go behind a treaty "to inquire whether or not an Indian tribe was properly represented by its head men, nor determine whether a treaty has been procured by duress or fraud, and declare it inoperative for that reason." The land claim and treaty issues remain controversial.

== See also ==
- Seven Nations (disambiguation)
