= Ojibwe =

Indigenous people of North America

Ojibwe (Chippewa) ᐅᒋᑉᐧᐁ (ᒋᑉᐯᐧᐊ)
Ojibweg, Ojibwe-Anishinaabeg ᐅᒋᐺᒃ, ᐅᒋᐺᐊᓂᔑᓈᐯᒃ (Ojibwe)
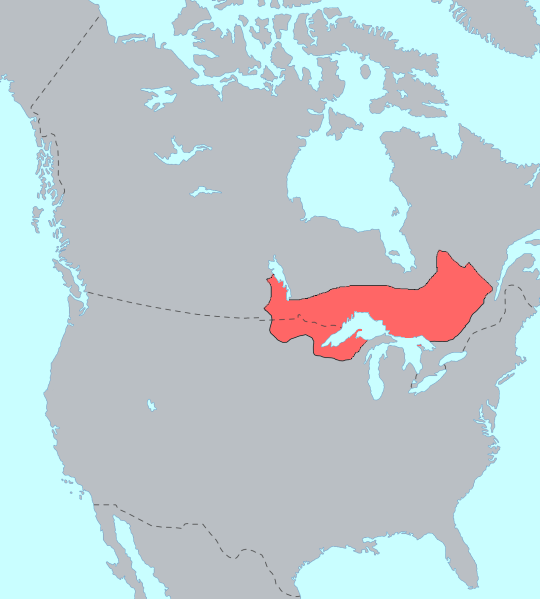
- Precontact distribution of Ojibwe-speaking people

Total population
- Between 120,000 to 220,000 as of 2020 in United States. 160,000 in Canada (2014)

Regions with significant populations
- Canada (Quebec, Ontario, Manitoba, Saskatchewan, Alberta); United States (Michigan, Wisconsin, Minnesota, North Dakota, Montana)

Languages
- English, Ojibwe, French

Religion
- Ojibwe religion, Catholicism, Methodism

Related ethnic groups
- Assiniboine, other Algonquian peoples Especially other Anishinaabe, Cree, and Métis

- Person: Ojibwe ᐅᒋᐺ; Anishinaabe ᐊᓂᔑᓈᐯ
- People: Ojibweg ᐅᒋᐺᒃ / ᐅᒋᐺᐠ; Anishinaabek ᐊᓂᔑᓈᐯᒃ / ᐊᓂᔑᓈᐯᐠ
- Language: Ojibwemowin ᐅᒋᐺᒧᐎᓐ; Anishinaabemowin ᐊᓂᐦᔑᓈᐯᒧᐎᓐ; Hand Talk
- Country: Ojibwewaki ᐅᒋᐻᐘᑭ; Anishinaabewaki ᐊᓂᔑᓈᐯᐘᑭ

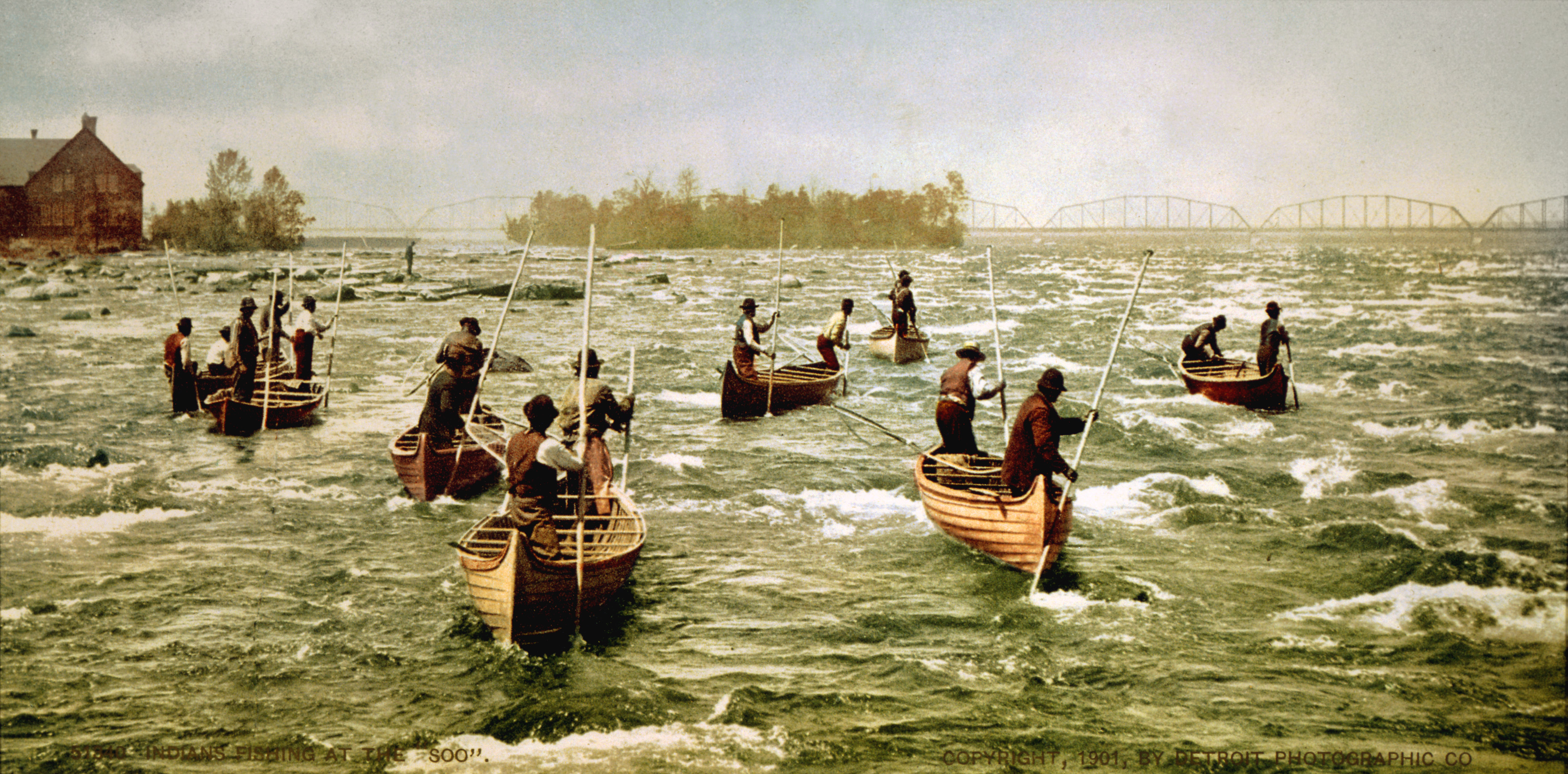
Ojibwe fishermen in the St. Marys Rapids, 1901

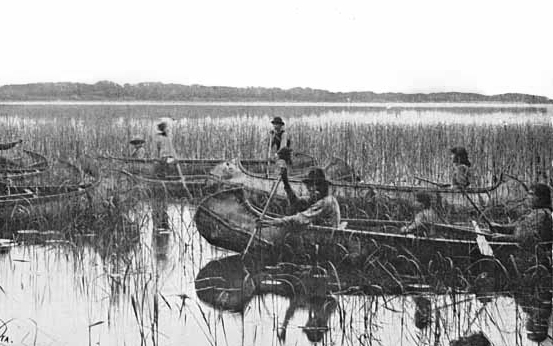
Manoomin picking, 1905, Minnesota

The Ojibwe (/oʊˈdʒɪbweɪ/ oh-JIB-way; syll.: ᐅᒋᐺ; plural: Ojibweg ᐅᒋᐺᒃ) are an Anishinaabe people whose homeland (Ojibwewaki ᐅᒋᐺᐗᑭ) covers much of the Great Lakes region and the northern plains, extending into the subarctic and throughout the northeastern woodlands. The Ojibwe, being Indigenous peoples of the Northeastern Woodlands and of the subarctic, are known by several names, including Ojibway or Chippewa. As a large ethnic group, several distinct nations also consider themselves Ojibwe, including the Saulteaux, Nipissings, and Oji-Cree.

According to the U.S. census, Ojibwe people are one of the largest tribal populations among Native American peoples in the U.S. In Canada, they are the second-largest First Nations population, surpassed only by the Cree. They are one of the most numerous Indigenous peoples north of the Rio Grande. The Ojibwe population is approximately 320,000, with 170,742 living in the U.S. as of 2010 and approximately 160,000 in Canada. In the U.S. there are 77,940 mainline Ojibwe, 76,760 Saulteaux, and 8,770 Mississauga, organized in 125 bands. In Canada they live from western Quebec to eastern British Columbia.

The Ojibwe language is Anishinaabemowin, a branch of the Algonquian language family.

The Ojibwe are part of the Council of Three Fires (along with the Odawa and Potawatomi) and of the larger Anishinaabeg, which includes Algonquin, Nipissing, and Oji-Cree people. Historically, through the Saulteaux branch, they were part of the Iron Confederacy, with the Cree, Assiniboine, and Metis.

The dreamcatcher originated from the Ojibwe and became a popular commercial item in the late 20th century and became a symbol for the Pan-Indian movement. The Ojibwe are known for their birchbark canoes, birchbark scrolls, mining and trade in copper, and their harvesting of wild rice and maple syrup. Their Midewiwin Society is well respected as the keeper of detailed and complex scrolls of events, oral history, songs, maps, memories, stories, geometry, and mathematics.

European powers, Canada, and the U.S. have colonized Ojibwe lands. The Ojibwe signed treaties with settler leaders to share land for the survival of settlers in exchange for compensation, according to Midewiwin laws pre-dating European contact, with an expectation of mutual non-interference. Many European settlers moved into the Ojibwe ancestral lands.

== Etymology ==
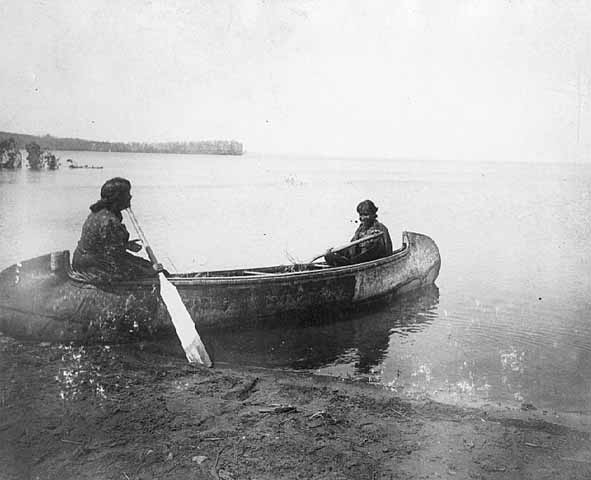
Ojibwa women in a canoe at Leech Lake, Minnesota, in 1909

The exonym for this Anishinaabe group is Ojibwe (plural: Ojibweg). This word has two variations, one French (Ojibwa) and the other English (Chippewa). Although many variations exist in the literature, Chippewa is more common in the United States, and Ojibway predominates in Canada, but both terms are used in each country. In many Ojibwe communities throughout Canada and the U.S. since the late 20th century, more members have been using the generalized name Anishinaabe(-g).

The meaning of the name Ojibwe is not known; the most common explanations for the name's origin are:

- ojiibwabwe (/o/ + /jiibw/ + /abwe/), meaning "those who cook/roast until it puckers", referring to their fire-curing of moccasin seams to make them waterproof. Some 19th century sources say this name described a method of ritual torture that the Ojibwe applied to enemies.
- ozhibii'iwe (/o/ + /zhibii'/ + /iwe/), meaning "those who keep records [of a Vision]", referring to their form of pictorial writing, and pictographs used in Midewiwin sacred rites; or
- ojiibwe (/o/ + /jiib/ + /we/), meaning "those who speak stiffly" or "those who stammer", an exonym or name given to them by the Cree, who described the Ojibwe language for its differences from their own.

Because many Ojibwe were formerly located around the outlet of Lake Superior, which the French colonists called Sault Ste. Marie for its rapids, the early Canadian settlers referred to the Ojibwe as Saulteurs. Ojibwe who subsequently moved to the prairie provinces of Canada have retained the name Saulteaux. This is disputed since some scholars believe that only the name migrated west. Ojibwe who were originally located along the Mississagi River and made their way to southern Ontario are known as the Mississaugas.

== Population history ==
In 1764 Henry Bouquet estimated that the Ojibwe had 5,000 warriors, which would imply a total population of about 25,000 people. The fighting strength of the Ojibwe was again estimated as 5,000 warriors in 1764 (by Thomas Hutchins) and in 1778. Gilbert Imlay in 1797 wrote about 5,700 Chippewa warriors, indicating a total population of about 28,500. According to Emmanuel Domenech the Ojibwe and Chippewa numbered around 36,000 people in 1860. In 1905 the Ojibwe in Canada numbered around 15,000 people, while the U.S. 1910 census counted 20,214 Chippewa in the U.S. (including 8,234 in Minnesota, 4,299 in Wisconsin, 3,725 in Michigan, 2,966 in North Dakota).

According to the 2010 United States census, there were at least 113,330 full-blood Chippewa people in the U.S. (including 110,697 who reported being only Chippewa and 2,633 who reported more than one tribe) as well as 54,744 mixed-race people with Chippewa ancestry. In the 2020 census at least 100,625 people reported being full-blood Chippewa in the U.S. According to the 2018 American Community Survey in total 212,116 people declared having Chippewa ancestry.

The exact population of Ojibwe in Canada is hard to estimate. However as of 2014, around 160,000 people are registered with one of the 200 bands.

== Language ==
The Ojibwe language is known as Anishinaabemowin or Ojibwemowin, and is still widely spoken, although the number of fluent speakers has declined sharply. Today, most of the language's fluent speakers are elders. Since the early 21st century, there is a growing movement to revitalize the language and restore its strength as a central part of Ojibwe culture. The language belongs to the Algonquian linguistic group and is descended from Proto-Algonquian. Its sister languages include Blackfoot, Cheyenne, Cree, Fox, Menominee, Potawatomi, and Shawnee among the northern Plains tribes. Anishinaabemowin is frequently referred to as a Central Algonquian language; Central Algonquian is a geographical grouping, however, rather than a linguistic genetic one.

Ojibwemowin is the fourth-most spoken Native language in North America after Navajo, Cree, and Inuktitut. Many decades of fur trading with the French established the language as one of the key trade languages of the Great Lakes and the northern Great Plains.

The popularity of the epic poem The Song of Hiawatha, written by Henry Wadsworth Longfellow in 1855, publicized the Ojibwe culture. The epic contains many toponyms that originate from Ojibwe words.

== History ==
=== Precontact and spiritual beliefs ===
According to Ojibwe oral history and from recordings in birch bark scrolls, the Ojibwe originated from the mouth of the Saint Lawrence River on the Atlantic coast of what is now Quebec. They traded widely across the continent for thousands of years as they migrated, and knew of the canoe routes to move north, west to east, and then south in the Americas. The identification of the Ojibwe as a culture or people may have occurred in response to contact with Europeans. The Europeans preferred to deal with groups, and tried to identify those they encountered.

According to Ojibwe oral history, seven great miigis (Cowrie shells) appeared to them in the Waabanakiing (Land of the Dawn, i.e., Eastern Land) to teach them the mide way of life. One of the miigis was too spiritually powerful and killed the people in the Waabanakiing when they were in its presence. The six others remained to teach, while the one returned into the ocean. The six established doodem (clans) for people in the east, symbolized by animals. The five original Anishinaabe doodem were the Wawaazisii (Bullhead), Baswenaazhi (Echo-maker, i.e., Crane), Aan'aawenh (Pintail), Nooke (Tender, i.e., Bear) and Moozoonsii (Little Moose). The six miigis then returned to the ocean as well. If the seventh had stayed, it would have established the Thunderbird doodem.

At a later time, one of these miigis appeared in a vision to relate a prophecy. It said that if the Anishinaabeg did not move farther west, they would not be able to keep their traditional ways alive because of the many new pale-skinned settlers who would arrive soon in the east. Their migration path would be symbolized by a series of smaller Turtle Islands, which was confirmed with miigis shells (i.e., cowry shells). After receiving assurance from their "Allied Brothers" (i.e., Mi'kmaq) and "Father" (i.e., Abenaki) of their safety to move inland, the Anishinaabeg gradually migrated west along the Saint Lawrence River to the Ottawa River to Lake Nipissing, and then to the Great Lakes.

The first of the smaller Turtle Islands was Mooniyaa, where Mooniyaang (present-day Montreal) developed. The "second stopping place" was in the vicinity of the Wayaanag-gakaabikaa (Concave Waterfalls, i.e., Niagara Falls). At their "third stopping place", near the present-day city of Detroit, Michigan, the Anishinaabeg divided into six groups, of which the Ojibwe was one.

The first significant new Ojibwe culture-center was their "fourth stopping place" on Manidoo Minising (Manitoulin Island). Their first new political-center was referred to as their "fifth stopping place", in their present country at Baawiting (Sault Ste. Marie). Continuing their westward expansion, the Ojibwe divided into the "northern branch", following the north shore of Lake Superior, and the "southern branch", along its south shore.

As the people continued to migrate westward, the "northern branch" divided into a "westerly group" and a "southerly group". The "southern branch" and the "southerly group" of the "northern branch" came together at their "sixth stopping place" on Spirit Island (46°41′15″N 092°11′21″W) located in the Saint Louis River estuary at the western end of Lake Superior. (This has since been developed as the present-day Duluth/Superior cities.) The people were directed in a vision by the miigis being to go to the "place where there is food (i.e., wild rice) upon the waters." Their second major settlement, referred to as their "seventh stopping place", was at Shaugawaumikong (or Zhaagawaamikong, French, Chequamegon) on the southern shore of Lake Superior, near the present La Pointe, Wisconsin.

The "westerly group" of the "northern branch" migrated along the Rainy River, Red River of the North, and across the northern Great Plains until reaching the Pacific Northwest. Along their migration to the west, they came across many miigis, or cowry shells, as told in the prophecy.

=== Contact with Europeans ===
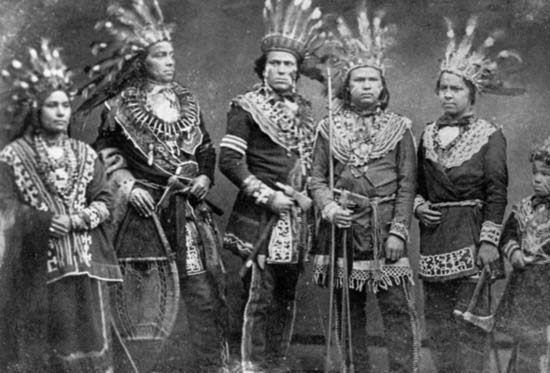
Maungwudaus, his wife, and three of his troupe of Ojibwa performers.

The first historical mention of the Ojibwe occurs in the French Jesuit Relation of 1640, a report by the missionary priests to their superiors in France. Through their friendship with the French traders (coureurs des bois and voyageurs), the Ojibwe gained guns, began to use European goods, and began to dominate their traditional enemies, the Lakota and Meskwaki to their west and south. They drove the Sioux from the Upper Mississippi region to the area of the present-day Dakotas, and forced the Meskwaki down from northern Wisconsin. The latter allied with the Sauk for protection.

By the end of the 18th century, the Ojibwe controlled nearly all of present-day Michigan, northern Wisconsin, and Minnesota, including most of the Red River area. They also controlled the entire northern shores of lakes Huron and Superior on the Canadian side and extending westward to the Turtle Mountains of North Dakota. In the latter area, the French Canadians called them Ojibwe or Saulteaux.

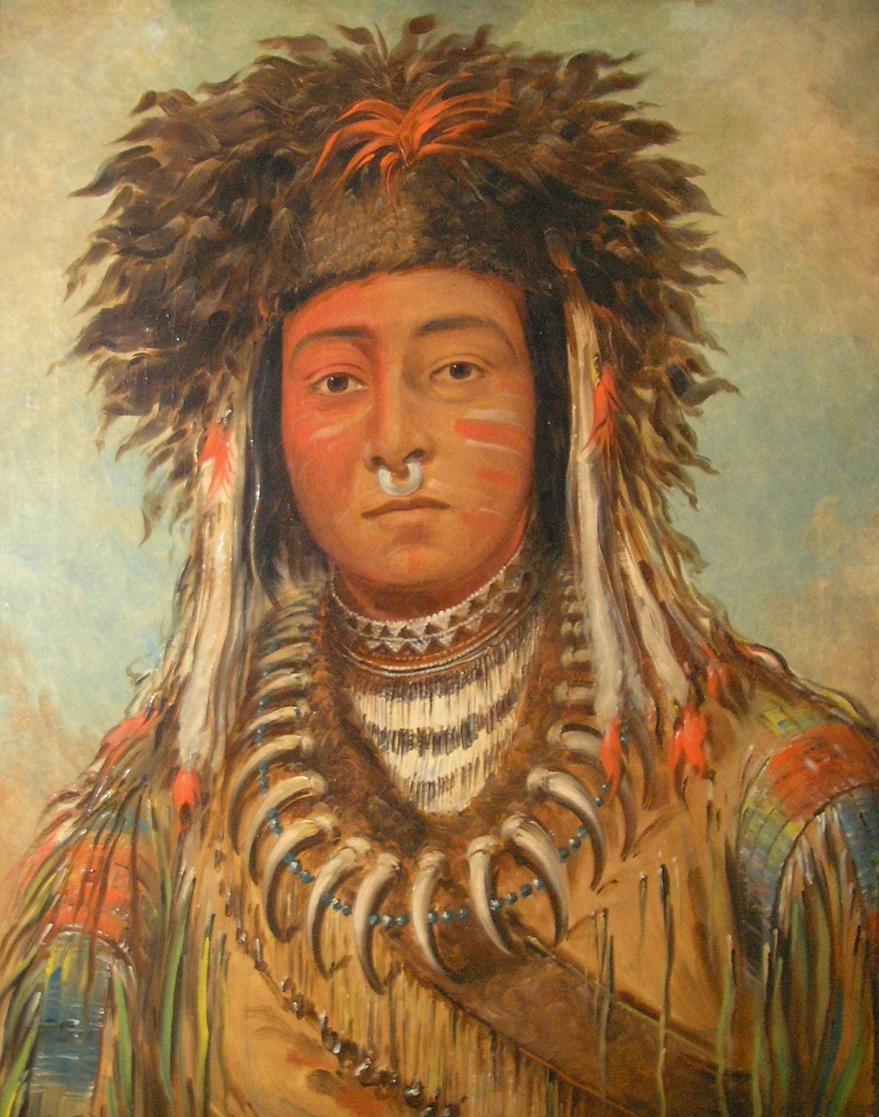
An Ojibwe named Boy Chief, by the noted American painter George Catlin, who made portraits at Fort Snelling in 1835. In 1845 he traveled to Paris with eleven Ojibwe, who had their portraits painted and danced for King Louis Philippe.

The Ojibwe were part of a long-term alliance with the Anishinaabe Odawa and Potawatomi peoples, called the Council of Three Fires. They fought against the Haudenosaunee Confederacy, based mainly to the southeast of the Great Lakes in present-day New York, and the Sioux to the west. The Ojibwe stopped the Haudenosaunee advance into their territory near Lake Superior in 1662. Then they formed an alliance with other tribes such as the Wyandot (Huron) and the Odawa who had been displaced by the Haudenosaunee invasion. Together they launched a massive counterattack against the Haudenosaunee and drove them out of Michigan and southern Ontario until they were forced to flee back to their original homeland in upstate New York. At the same time the Haudenosaunee were subjected to attacks by the French. This was the beginning of the end of the Haudenosaunee Confederacy as they were put on the defensive. The Ojibwe expanded eastward, taking over the lands along the eastern shores of Lake Huron and Georgian Bay.

In 1745, they adopted guns from the British in order to repel the Dakota people in the Lake Superior area, pushing them to the south and west. In the 1680s the Ojibwa defeated the Haudenosaunee who dispersed their Wyandot allies and trading partners. This victory allowed them a "golden age" in which they ruled uncontested in southern Ontario.

Often, treaties known as "peace and friendship treaties" were made to establish community bonds between the Ojibwe and the European settlers. These established the groundwork for cooperative resource-sharing between the Ojibwe and the settlers. The United States and Canada viewed later treaties offering land cessions as offering territorial advantages. The Ojibwe did not understand the land cession terms in the same way because of the cultural differences in understanding the uses of land. The governments of the U.S. and Canada considered land a commodity of value that could be freely bought, owned and sold. The Ojibwe believed it was a fully shared resource, along with air, water and sunlight—despite having an understanding of "territory". At the time of the treaty councils, they could not conceive of separate land sales or exclusive ownership of land. Consequently, today, in both Canada and the U.S., legal arguments in treaty-rights and treaty interpretations often bring to light the differences in cultural understanding of treaty terms to come to legal understanding of the treaty obligations.

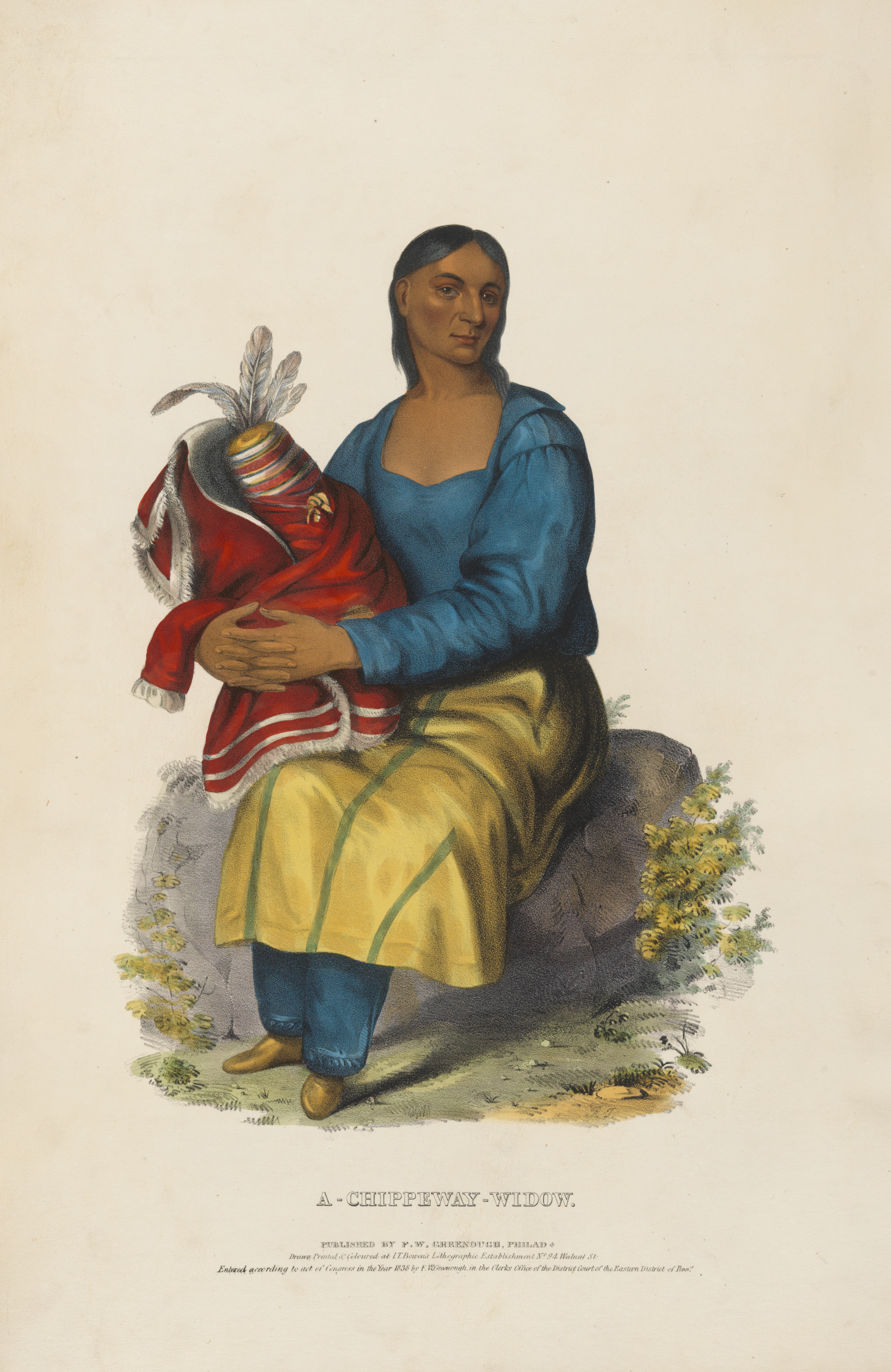
A Chippeway Widow, 1838

In part because of their long trading alliance, the Ojibwe allied with the French against Great Britain and its colonists in the Seven Years' War (also called the French and Indian War). After losing the war in 1763, France was forced to cede its colonial claims to lands in Canada and east of the Mississippi River to Britain. After Pontiac's War and adjusting to British colonial rule, the Ojibwe allied with British forces against the United States in the War of 1812. They had hoped that a British victory could protect them against United States settlers' encroachment on their territory.

Following the war, the United States government tried to forcibly remove all the Ojibwe to Minnesota, west of the Mississippi River. The Ojibwe resisted, and there were violent confrontations. In the Sandy Lake Tragedy, several hundred Ojibwe died because of the federal government's failure to deliver fall annuity payments. The government attempted to do this in the Keweenaw Peninsula in the Upper Peninsula of Michigan. Through the efforts of Chief Buffalo and the rise of popular opinion in the U.S. against Ojibwe removal, the bands east of the Mississippi were allowed to return to reservations on ceded territory. A few families were removed to Kansas as part of the Potawatomi removal.

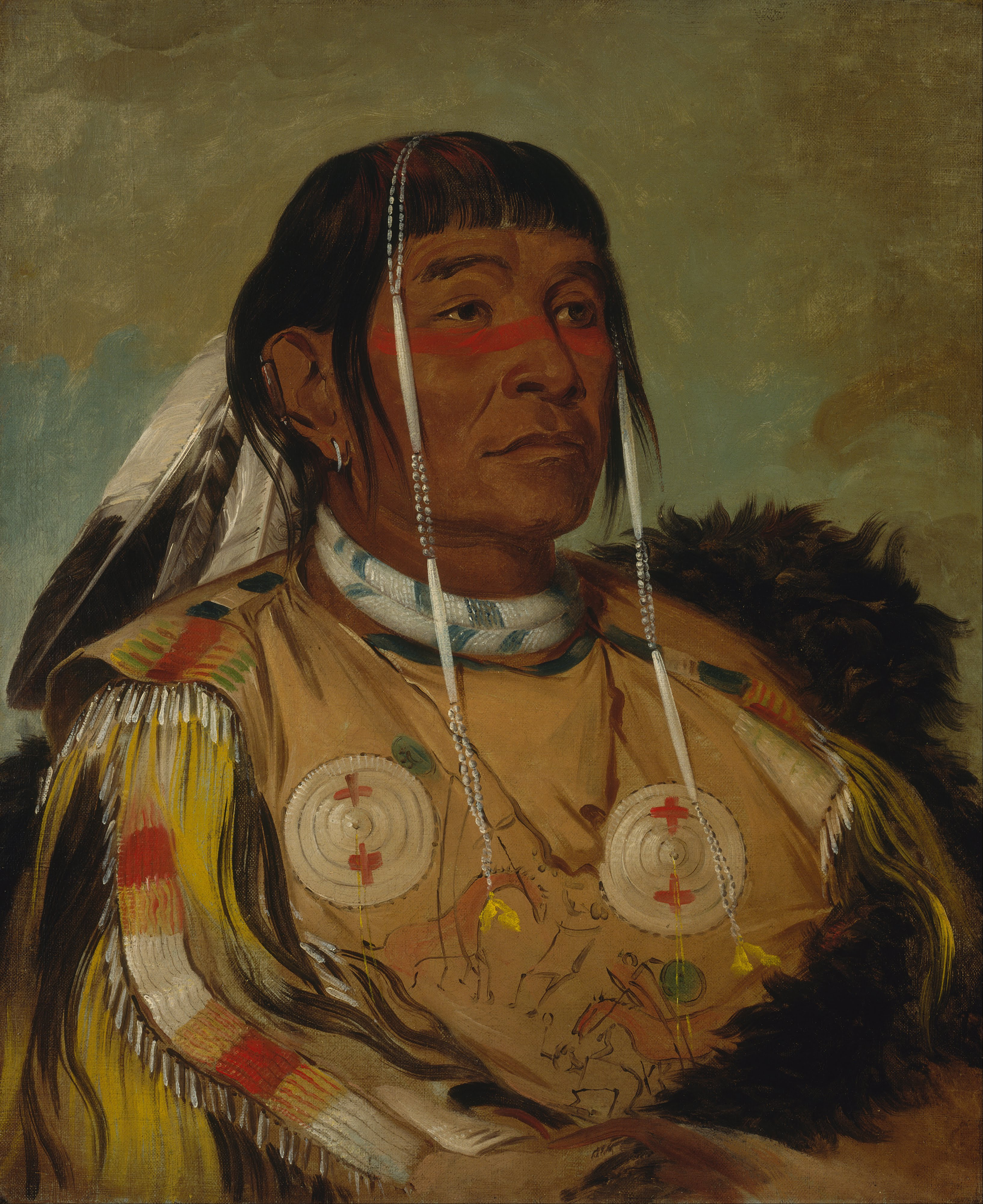
Plains Ojibwe Chief Sha-có-pay (The Six). In addition to the northern and eastern woodlands, Ojibwe people also lived on the prairies of Manitoba, Saskatchewan, Alberta, North Dakota, western Minnesota and Montana.

In British North America, the Royal Proclamation of 1763 following the Seven Years' War governed the cession of land by treaty or purchase. Subsequently, France ceded most of the land in Upper Canada to Great Britain. Even with the Jay Treaty signed between Great Britain and the United States following the American Revolutionary War, the newly formed United States did not fully uphold the treaty. As it was still preoccupied by war with France, Great Britain ceded to the United States much of the lands in Ohio, Indiana, Michigan, parts of Illinois and Wisconsin, and northern Minnesota and North Dakota to settle the boundary of their holdings in Canada.

In 1807, the Ojibwe joined three other tribes, the Odawa, Potawatomi and Wyandot people, in signing the Treaty of Detroit. The agreement, between the tribes and William Hull, representing the Michigan Territory, gave the United States a portion of today's Southeastern Michigan and a section of Ohio near the Maumee River. The tribes were able to retain small pockets of land in the territory.

The Battle of the Brule was an October 1842 battle between the La Pointe Band of Ojibwe Indians and a war party of Dakota Indians. The battle took place along the Brule River (Bois Brûlé) in what is today northern Wisconsin and resulted in a decisive victory for the Ojibwe.

In Canada, many of the land cession treaties the British made with the Ojibwe provided for their rights for continued hunting, fishing and gathering of natural resources after land sales. The government signed numbered treaties in northwestern Ontario, Manitoba, Saskatchewan, and Alberta. British Columbia had not signed treaties until the late 20th century, and most areas have no treaties yet. The government and First Nations are continuing to negotiate treaty land entitlements and settlements. The treaties are constantly being reinterpreted by the courts because many of them are vague and difficult to apply in modern times. The numbered treaties were some of the most detailed treaties signed for their time. The Ojibwe Nation set the agenda and negotiated the first numbered treaties before they would allow safe passage of many more British settlers to the prairies.

In the 1930s, the government of Minnesota declared a state of emergency due to the lack of wild rice on Ojibwe lands, because it did not have the funds to feed Native people, and instead wanted the Ojibwe to rely on traditional sources of food. They relied on Native elders to write and enforce state statutes which would preserve wild rice fields, after amateur farmers had damaged wild rice fields statewide.

Ojibwe communities have a strong history of political and social activism. Long before contact, they were closely aligned with Odawa and Potawatomi people in the Council of the Three Fires. From the 1870s to 1938, the Grand General Indian Council of Ontario attempted to reconcile multiple traditional models into one cohesive voice to exercise political influence over colonial legislation. In the West, 16 Plains Cree and Ojibwe bands formed the Allied Bands of Qu'Appelle in 1910 in order to redress concerns about the failure of the government to uphold Treaty 4's promises.

== Culture ==
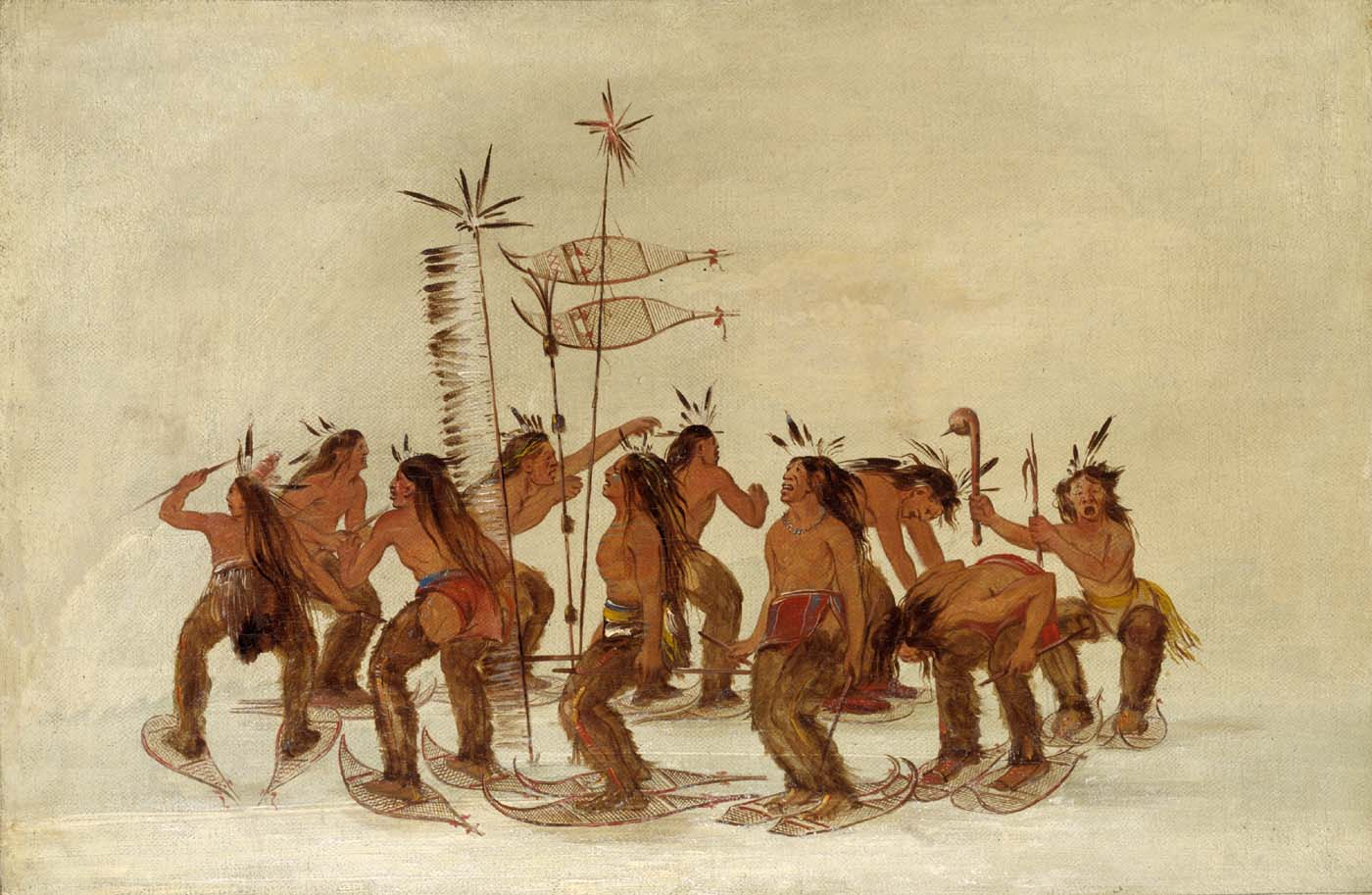
Plains Ojibwe performing a snowshoe dance. By George Catlin

The Ojibwe have traditionally organized themselves into groups known as bands. Most Ojibwe, except for the Great Plains bands, have historically lived a settled (as opposed to nomadic) lifestyle, relying on fishing and hunting to supplement the cultivation of numerous varieties of maize and squash, and the harvesting of manoomin (wild rice) for food. Historically their typical dwelling has been the wiigiwaam (wigwam), built either as a waginogaan (domed-lodge) or as a nasawa'ogaan (pointed-lodge), made of birch bark, juniper bark and willow saplings. In the contemporary era, most of the people live in modern housing, but traditional structures are still used for special sites and events.

They have a culturally-specific form of pictorial writing, used in the religious rites of the Midewiwin and recorded on birch bark scrolls and possibly on rock. The many complex pictures on the sacred scrolls communicate much historical, geometrical, and mathematical knowledge, as well as images from their spiritual pantheon. The use of petroforms, petroglyphs, and pictographs has been common throughout the Ojibwe traditional territories. Petroforms and medicine wheels have been used to teach important spiritual concepts, record astronomical events, and to use as a mnemonic device for certain stories and beliefs. The script is still in use, among traditional people as well as among youth on social media.

Some ceremonies use the miigis shell (cowry shell), which is found naturally in distant coastal areas. Their use of such shells demonstrates there is a vast, longstanding trade network across the continent. The use and trade of copper across the continent has also been proof of a large trading network that took place for thousands of years, as far back as the Hopewell tradition. Certain types of rock used for spear and arrow heads have also been traded over large distances precontact.

During the summer months, the people attend jiingotamog for the spiritual and niimi'idimaa for a social gathering (powwows) at various reservations in the Anishinaabe-Aki (Anishinaabe Country). Many people still follow the traditional ways of harvesting wild rice, picking berries, hunting, making medicines, and making maple sugar.

The jingle dress that is typically worn by female pow wow dancers originated from the Ojibwe. Both Plains and Woodlands Ojibwe claim the earliest form of dark cloth dresses decorated with rows of tin cones - often made from the lids of tobacco cans- that make a jingling sound when worn by the dancer. This style of dress is now popular with all tribes and is a distinctly Ojibwe contribution to Pan-Indianism.

The Ojibwe bury their dead in burial mounds. Many erect a jiibegamig or a "spirit house" over each mound. An historical burial mound would typically have a wooden marker, inscribed with the deceased's doodem (clan sign). Because of the distinct features of these burials, Ojibwe graves have been often looted by grave robbers. In the United States, many Ojibwe communities safe-guard their burial mounds through the enforcement of the 1990 Native American Graves Protection and Repatriation Act.

Several Ojibwe bands in the United States cooperate in the Great Lakes Indian Fish & Wildlife Commission, which manages the treaty hunting and fishing rights in the Lake Superior-Lake Michigan areas. The commission follows the directives of U.S. agencies to run several wilderness areas. Some Minnesota Ojibwe tribal councils cooperate in the 1854 Treaty Authority, which manages their treaty hunting and fishing rights in the Arrowhead Region. In Michigan, the Chippewa-Ottawa Resource Authority manages the hunting, fishing and gathering rights about Sault Ste. Marie, and the resources of the waters of lakes Michigan and Huron. In Canada, the Grand Council of Treaty No. 3 manages the Treaty 3 hunting and fishing rights related to the area around Lake of the Woods.

=== Cuisine ===
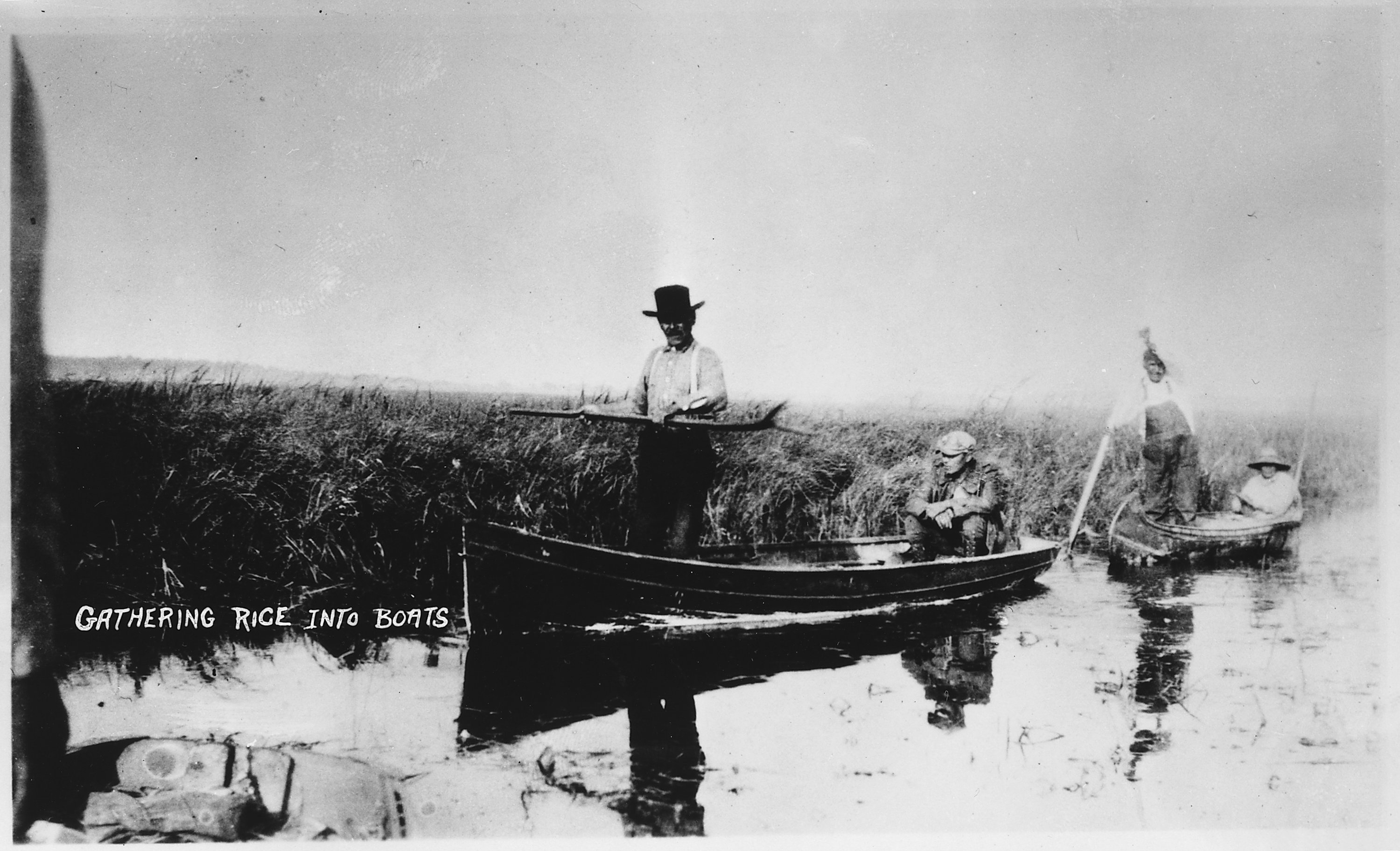
Wild rice harvesting – 1934

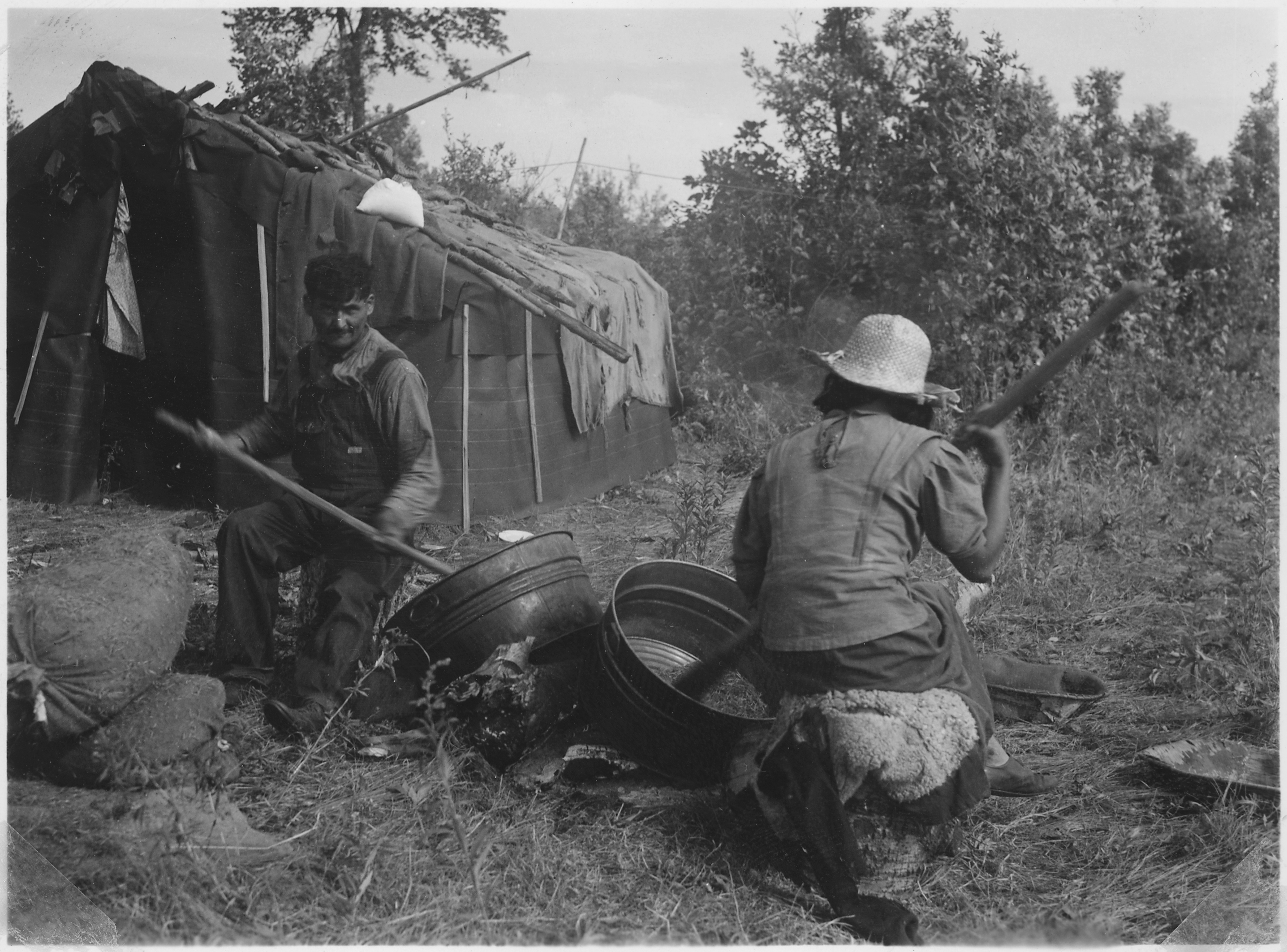
Vintage photo entitled, "Paul Buffalo and wife parching wild rice at their camp" – 1934

There is renewed interest in nutritious eating among the Ojibwe, who have been expanding community gardens in food deserts, and have started a mobile kitchen to teach their communities about nutritious food preparation. The traditional Native American diet was seasonally dependent on hunting, fishing and the foraging and farming of produce and grains. The modern diet has substituted some other types of food like frybread and "Indian tacos" in place of these traditionally prepared meals. The Native Americans loss of connection to their culture is part of the "quest to reconnect to their food traditions" sparking an interest in traditional ingredients like wild rice. Other staple foods of the Ojibwe were fish, maple sugar, venison and corn. They grew beans, squash, corn and potatoes and foraged for blueberries, blackberries, choke cherries, raspberries, gooseberries and huckleberries. During the summer game animals like deer, beaver, moose, goose, duck, rabbits and bear were hunted.

One traditional method of making granulated sugar known among the Anishinabe was to boil maple syrup until reduced and pour into a trough, where the rapidly cooling syrup was quickly processed into maple sugar using wooden paddles.

==== Manoomin (wild rice) ====
Manoomin grown in the wild has a nutty flavor, nonuniform color, and variability in size. Ojibwe harvest wild rice in late summer and early autumn. Families gather rice grain together, called “ricing", on rice beds or Manito Gitigaan (the Great Spirit's Garden). One person pushes the canoe, while the other "knocks" ripe grain into the canoe using knocking sticks. Later, once rice is processed, it is parched in an iron kettle over an open fire. Once golden, it is "jigged"; danced or walked on to remove hulls. Finally, the rice is winnowed, or tossed in the air so the wind blows the lighter hull away. Wild rice is often one of the first and last foods Ojibwe people eat in their lives. Ojibwe have a reciprocal relationship with the food, taking care of it so it can thrive while using it as sustenance. Spiritual offerings including tobacco and prayers are given to ensure fruitful harvests.

Ojibwe people have been eating wild rice as early as 2,000 years before their contact with white settlers. Treaties between the Ojibwe and the U.S. Government in 1837 and 1854 enshrined Native peoples' right to harvest manoomin, but were not always upheld. Since white people began colonizing Ojibwe lands, settlers have clearcut forests for timber, drained lakes and marshes to cultivate farmland, built dams to control water levels, introduced invasive species, and used waterways for log transportation, thereby damaging wild rice ecosystems. Native people have also been prevented from accessing waterways and tending manoomin beds due to land loss.

In the 1920s, white settlers became interested in manoomin. Amateur farmers began planting wild rice farms, without knowledge about ripening times and harmed rice beds. They used mechanical harvesters to tear up manoomin from the roots, broke their stems, and disturbed ripening schedules. Laws passed in 1931 and 1939, respectively, prevented farmers from using mechanized harvesters for manoomin, and deemed the destruction of wild rice unlawful. The 1939 bill also created the role of the director of wild rice harvest, chosen by the Department of Natural Resources (DNR).

Manoomin cultivation grew as an industry throughout the 1930s and 1940s. In the 1950s, the University of Minnesota began experimenting with non-shattering varieties that could be mass cultivated in paddies and machine-harvested. In 1973, the university began a wild rice research program to support the industry. Commercial cultivation led to a crash in hand-harvested rice in the 1970s, which has only recently rebounded. In 1996, the DNR eliminated the role of director of wild rice harvest. In 2018, the White Earth Band of Ojibwe adopted the "rights of manoomin", which states that wild rice has an inherent right to exist and flourish. Today, wild rice is threatened by changing water levels, mining, water contamination, climate change, and invasive species.

=== Kinship and clan system ===
Photo of Ojibwe man published in 1912

Traditionally, the Ojibwe had a patrilineal system, in which children were considered born to the father's clan. For this reason, children with French or English fathers were considered outside the clan and Ojibwe society unless adopted by an Ojibwe male. They were sometimes referred to as "white" because of their fathers, regardless if their mothers were Ojibwe, as they had no official place in the Ojibwe society. The people would shelter the woman and her children, but they did not have the same place in the culture as children born to Ojibwe fathers.

Ojibwe understanding of kinship is complex and includes the immediate family as well as extended family. It is considered a modified bifurcate merging kinship system. As with any bifurcate-merging kinship system, siblings generally share the same kinship term with parallel cousins because they are all part of the same clan. The modified system allows for younger siblings to share the same kinship term with younger cross-cousins. Complexity wanes further from the person's immediate generation, but some complexity is retained with female relatives. For example, ninooshenh is "my mother's sister" or "my father's sister-in-law" – i.e., my parallel-aunt, but also "my parent's female cross-cousin". Great-grandparents and older generations, as well as great-grandchildren and younger generations, are collectively called aanikoobijigan. This system of kinship reflects the Anishinaabe philosophy of interconnectedness and balance among all living generations, as well as of all generations of the past and of the future.

The Ojibwe people were divided into a number of doodemag (clans; singular: doodem) named primarily for animals and birds totems (pronounced doodem). The word in the Ojibwe language means "my fellow clansman." The five original totems were Wawaazisii (Bullhead), Baswenaazhi/"Ajiijaak" ("Echo-maker", i.e., Crane), Aan'aawenh (Pintail Duck), Nooke ("Tender", i.e., Bear) and Moozwaanowe ("Little" Moose-tail). The Crane totem was the most vocal among the Ojibwe, and the Bear was the largest – so large, that it was sub-divided into body parts such as the head, the ribs and the feet. Each clan had certain responsibilities among the people. People had to marry a spouse from a different clan.

Traditionally, each band had a self-regulating council consisting of leaders of the communities' clans, or odoodemaan. The band was often identified by the principal doodem. In meeting others, the traditional greeting among the Ojibwe people is, "What is your 'doodem'?" ("Aaniin gidoodem?" or "Awanen gidoodem?") The response allows the parties to establish social conduct by identifying as family, friends or enemies. Today, the greeting has been shortened to "Aanii" (pronounced "Ah-nee").

=== Spiritual beliefs ===
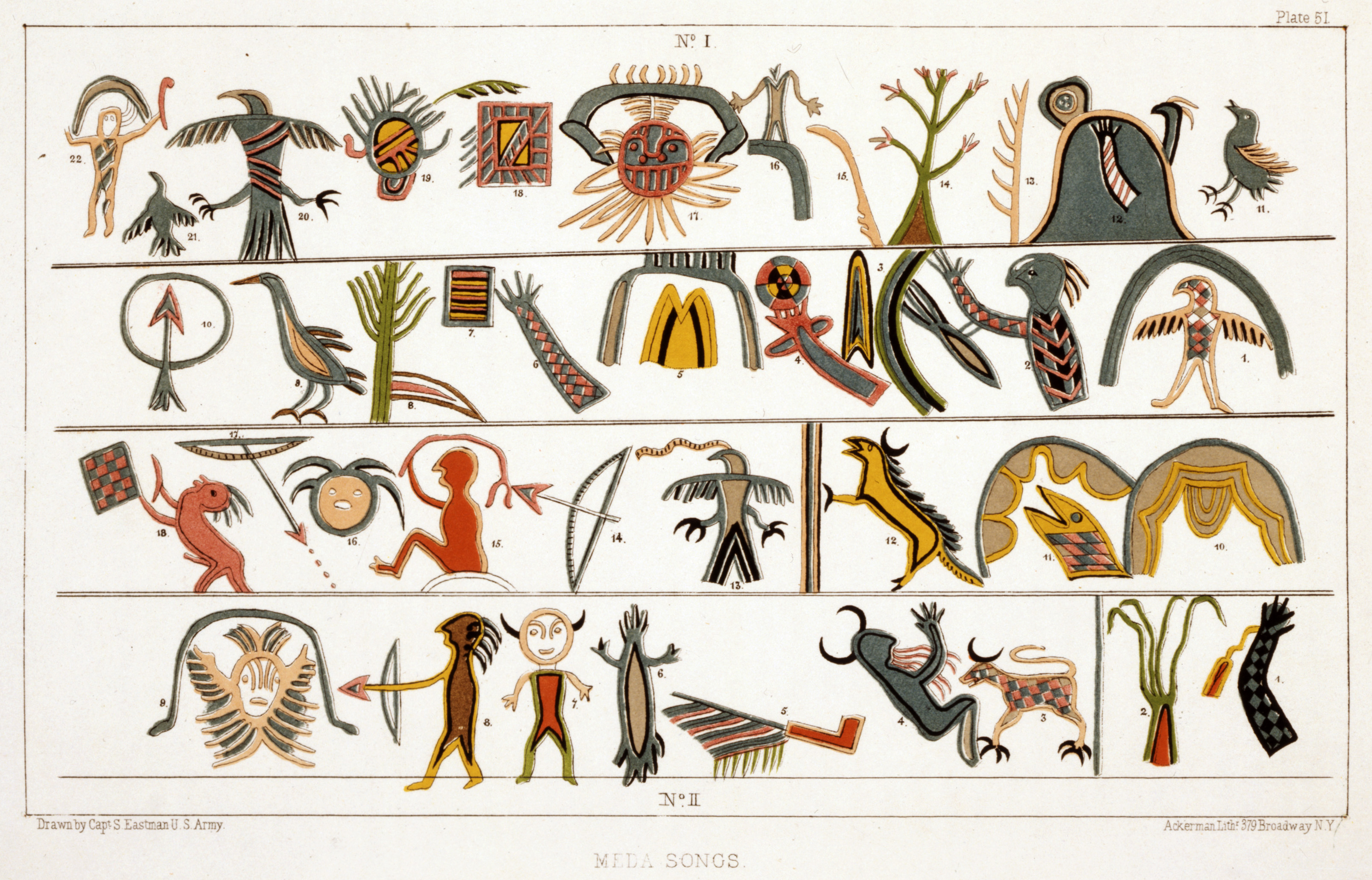
Pictorial notation of an Ojibwe music board

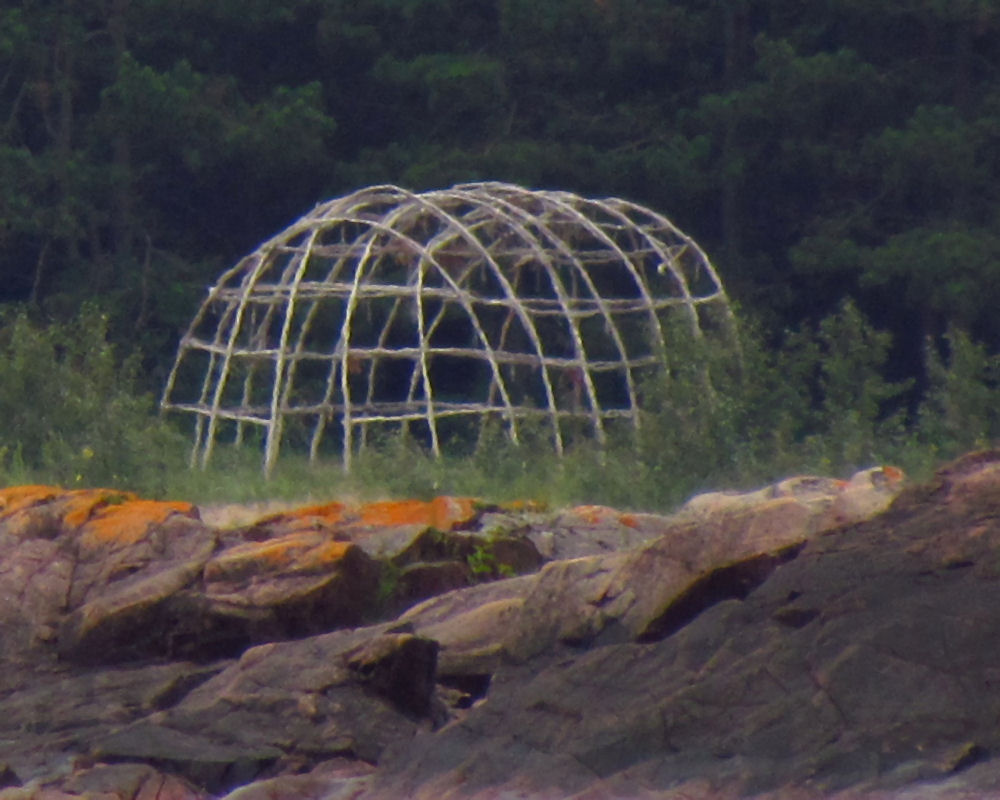
Frame of Ojibwe sweatlodge

The Ojibwe have spiritual beliefs that have been passed down by oral tradition under the Midewiwin teachings. These include a creation story and a recounting of the origins of ceremonies and rituals. Spiritual beliefs and rituals were very important to the Ojibwe because spirits guided them through life. Birch bark scrolls and petroforms were used to pass along knowledge and information, as well as for ceremonies. Pictographs were also used for ceremonies.

The sweatlodge is still used during important ceremonies about the four directions, when oral history is recounted. Teaching lodges are common today to teach the next generations about the language and ancient ways of the past. The traditional ways, ideas, and teachings are preserved and practiced in such living ceremonies.

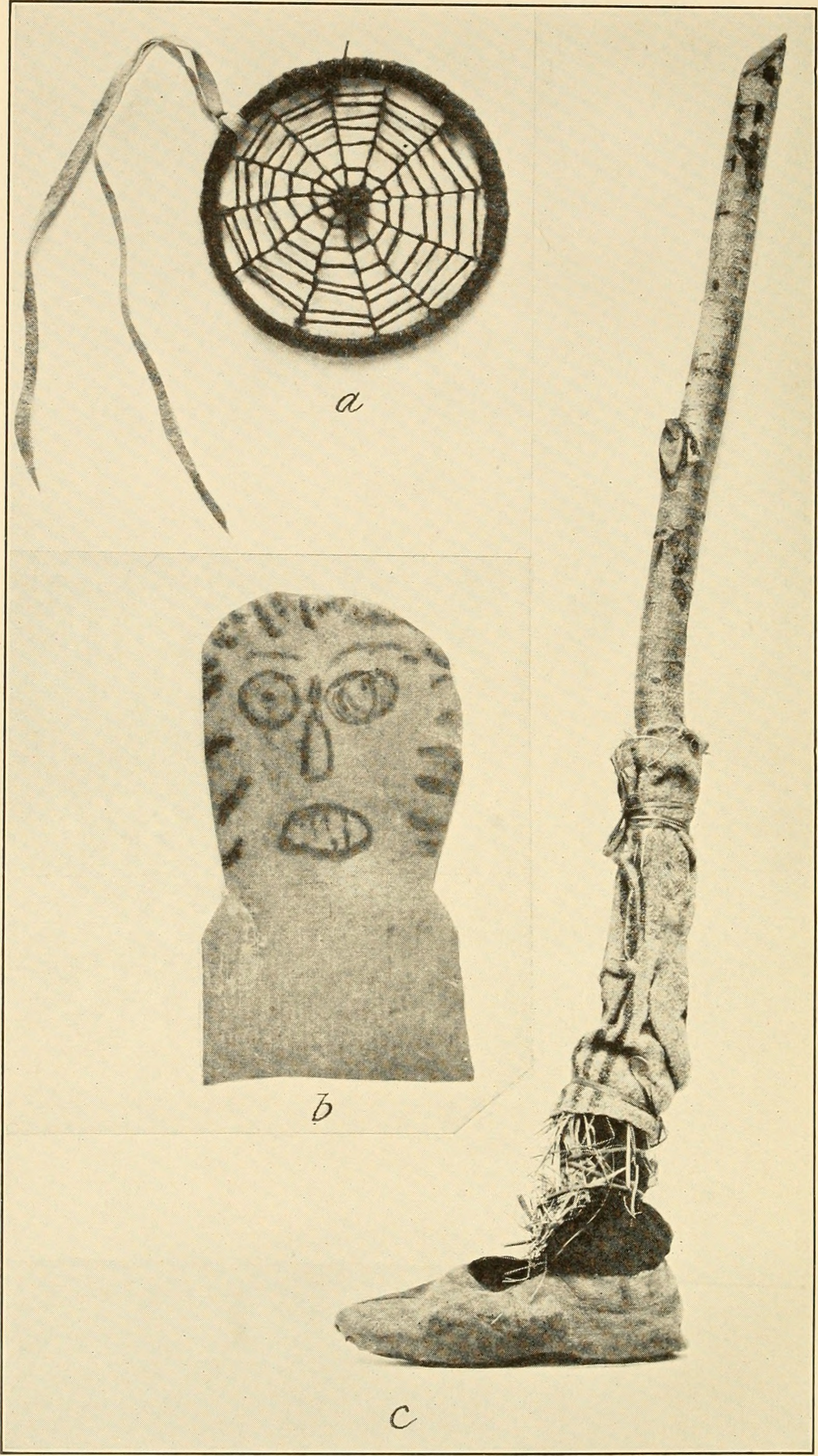
"Spider web" charm, hung on infant's cradle (shown alongside a "Mask used in game" and "Ghost leg), to frighten children", Bureau of American Ethnology Bulletin (1929).

The modern dreamcatcher, adopted by the Pan-Indian Movement and New Age groups, originated in the Ojibwe "spider web charm", a hoop with woven string or sinew meant to replicate a spider's web, used as a protective charm for infants. According to Ojibwe legend, the protective charms originate with the Spider Woman, known as Asibikaashi; who takes care of the children and the people on the land and as the Ojibwe Nation spread to the corners of North America it became difficult for Asibikaashi to reach all the children, so the mothers and grandmothers wove webs for the children, which had an apotropaic purpose and were not explicitly connected with dreams.

=== Funeral practices ===
==== Traditional ====
In Ojibwe tradition, the main task after a death is to bury the body as soon as possible, the very next day or even on the day of death. This was important because it allowed the spirit of the dead to journey to its place of joy and happiness. The land of happiness where the dead reside is called Gaagige Minawaanigozigiwining. This was a journey that took four days. If burial preparations could not be completed the day of the death, guests and medicine men were required to stay with the deceased and the family in order to help mourn, while also singing songs and dancing throughout the night. Once preparations were complete, the body would be placed in an inflexed position with their knees towards their chest. Over the course of the four days it takes the spirit to journey to its place of joy, it is customary to have food kept alongside the grave at all times. A fire is set when the sun sets and is kept going throughout the night. The food is to help feed the spirit over the course of the journey, while the smoke from the fire is a directional guide. Once the four–day journey is over, a feast is held, which is led by the chief medicine man. At the feast, it is the chief medicine man's duty to give away certain belongings of the deceased. Those who were chosen to receive items from the deceased are required to trade in a new piece of clothing, all of which would be turned into a bundle. The bundle of new clothes and a dish is then given to the closest relative. The recipient of the bundle must then find individuals that he or she believes to be worthy, and pass on one of the new pieces of clothing.

==== Contemporary ====
According to Lee Staples, an Ojibwe spiritual leader from the Mille Lacs Indian Reservation, present day practices follow the same spiritual beliefs and remain fairly similar. When an individual dies, a fire is lit in the home of the family, who are also expected to continuously maintain the fire for four days. Over the four days, food is also offered to the spirit. Added to food offerings, tobacco is also offered as it is considered one of four sacred medicines traditionally used by Ojibwe communities. On the last night of food offerings, a feast is also held by the relatives which ends with a final smoke of the offering tobacco or the tobacco being thrown in the fire. Although conventional caskets are mainly used in today's communities, birch bark fire matches are buried along with the body as a tool to help light fires to guide their journey to Gaagige Minawaanigozigiwining.

=== Ethnobotany ===
Plants used by the Ojibwe include Agrimonia gryposepala, used for urinary problems, and Pinus strobus, the resin of which was used to treat infections and gangrene. The roots of Symphyotrichum novae-angliae are smoked in pipes to attract game. Allium tricoccum is eaten as part of Ojibwe cuisine. They also use a decoction as a quick-acting emetic. An infusion of the alba subspecies of Silene latifolia is used as physic. The South Ojibwa use a decoction of the root Viola canadensis for pains near the bladder. The Ojibwa are documented to use the root of Uvularia grandiflora for pain in the solar plexus, which may refer to pleurisy. They take a compound decoction of the root of Ribes glandulosum for back pain and for "female weakness".

The Ojibwe eat the corms of Sagittaria cuneata for indigestion, and also as a food, eaten boiled fresh, dried or candied with maple sugar. Muskrat and beavers store them in large caches, which they have learned to recognize and appropriate. They take an infusion of the Antennaria howellii ssp. neodioica after childbirth to purge afterbirth and to heal. They use the roots of Solidago rigida, using a decoction of root as an enema and take an infusion of the root for "stoppage of urine". (Note: This source comes from the Native American ethnobotany database which lists the plant as Oligoneuron rigidum var. rigidum.) They use Abies balsamea; melting the gum on warm stones and inhaling the fumes for headache. They also use a decoction of the root as an herbal steam for rheumatic joints. They also combine the gum with bear grease and use it as an ointment for hair. They use the needle-like leaves in as part of ceremony involving the sweatbath, and use the gum for colds and inhale the leaf smoke for colds. They use the plant as a cough medicine. The gum is used for sores and a compound containing leaves is used as wash. The liquid balsam from bark blisters is used for sore eyes. They boil the resin twice and add it to suet or fat to make a canoe pitch. The bark gum is taken for chest soreness from colds, applied to cuts and sores, and decoction of the bark is used to induce sweating. The bark gum is also taken for gonorrhea. A decoction (tea) of powdered, dried Onoclea sensibilis root is used to stimulate milk flow in female patients.

== Bands ==
In his History of the Ojibway People (1855), William W. Warren recorded 10 major divisions of the Ojibwe in the US. He omitted the Ojibwe located in Michigan, western Minnesota and westward, and all of Canada. When major historical bands located in Michigan and Ontario are added, the total is 15:

| English name | Ojibwe Name (in double-vowel spelling) | Location |
|---|---|---|
| Saulteaux | Baawitigowininiwag | Sault Ste. Marie area of Ontario and Michigan |
| Border-Sitters | Biitan-akiing-enabijig | St. Croix-Namekagon River valleys in eastern Minnesota and northern Wisconsin |
| Lake Superior Band | Gichi-gamiwininiwag | south shore of Lake Superior |
| Mississippi River Band | Gichi-ziibiwininiwag | upper Mississippi River in Minnesota |
| Rainy Lake Band | Goojijiwininiwag | Rainy Lake and River, about the northern boundary of Minnesota |
| Ricing-Rails | Manoominikeshiinyag | along headwaters of St. Croix River in Wisconsin and Minnesota |
| Pillagers | Makandwewininiwag | North-central Minnesota and Mississippi River headwaters |
| Mississaugas | Misi-zaagiwininiwag | north of Lake Erie, extending north of Lake Huron about the Mississagi River |
| Dokis Band (Dokis's and Restoule's bands) | —N/a | Along French River (Wemitigoj-Sibi) region (including Little French River (Ziibiins) and Restoule River) in Ontario, near Lake Nipissing |
| Ottawa Lake (Lac Courte Oreilles) Band | Odaawaa-zaaga'iganiwininiwag | Lac Courte Oreilles, Wisconsin |
| Bois Forte Band | Zagaakwaandagowininiwag | north of Lake Superior |
| Lac du Flambeau Band | Waaswaaganiwininiwag | head of Wisconsin River |
| Muskrat Portage Band | Wazhashk-Onigamininiwag | northwest side of Lake Superior at the Canada–US border |
| Nopeming Band | Noopiming Azhe-ininiwag | northeast of Lake Superior and west of Lake Nipissing |

Numerous Ojibwe First Nations, tribes, and bands exist in Canada and the United States. See also the listing of Saulteaux communities.

- Aamjiwnaang First Nation
- Aroland First Nation
- Batchewana First Nation
- Bay Mills Indian Community
- Biinjitiwabik Zaaging Anishnabek First Nation
- Burt Lake Band of Chippewa and Ottawa Indians
- Caldwell First Nation
- Chapleau Ojibway First Nation
- Chippewas of Kettle and Stony Point
- Chippewas of Lake Simcoe and Huron (Historical)
  - Beausoleil First Nation
  - Chippewas of Georgina Island First Nation
  - Chippewas of Rama First Nation (formerly known as Chippewas of Mnjikaning First Nation)
- Chippewas of Nawash Unceded First Nation
- Chippewa of the Thames First Nation
- Chippewas of Saugeen Ojibway Territory, historical
  - Chippewas of Nawash Unceded First Nation
  - Saugeen First Nation
- Chippewa Cree Tribe of Rocky Boys Indian Reservation
- Curve Lake First Nation
- Cutler First Nation
- Dokis First Nation
- Eabametoong First Nation
- Fort William First Nation
- Grand Traverse Band of Ottawa and Chippewa Indians
- Garden River First Nation
- Henvey Inlet First Nation
- Grassy Narrows First Nation (Asabiinyashkosiwagong Nitam-Anishinaabeg)
- Islands in the Trent Waters
- Keeseekoowenin Ojibway First Nation (also known as Riding Mountain Band)
- Koocheching First Nation
- Lac des Mille Lacs First Nation
- Lac La Croix First Nation
- Lac Seul First Nation
- Lake Nipigon Ojibway First Nation
- Lake Superior Chippewa Tribe
  - Bad River Chippewa Band
  - Lac Vieux Desert Band of Lake Superior Chippewa
  - Keweenaw Bay Indian Community
    - L'Anse Band of Chippewa Indians
    - Ontonagon Band of Chippewa Indians
  - Lac Courte Oreilles Band of Lake Superior Chippewa Indians
    - Bois Brule River Band of Lake Superior Chippewa
    - Chippewa River Band of Lake Superior Chippewa
    - Lac Courte Oreilles Band of Lake Superior Chippewa Indians
    - Removable St. Croix Chippewa Indians of Wisconsin
  - Lac du Flambeau Band of Lake Superior Chippewa
  - Red Cliff Band of Lake Superior Chippewa
  - Sokaogon Chippewa Community
  - St. Croix Chippewa Indians of Wisconsin
- Little Shell Tribe of Chippewa Indians of Montana
- Little Traverse Bay Bands of Odawa Indians, Michigan
- Mackinac Bands of Chippewa and Ottawa Indians
- Magnetawan First Nation, Ontario
- Minnesota Chippewa Tribe, Minnesota
  - Bois Forte Band of Chippewa
    - Bois Forte Band of Chippewa
    - Lake Vermilion Band of Lake Superior Chippewa
    - Little Forks Band of Rainy River Saulteaux
  - Fond du Lac Band of Lake Superior Chippewa
  - Grand Portage Band of Chippewa
  - Leech Lake Band of Ojibwe
    - Cass Lake Band of Chippewa
    - Lake Winnibigoshish Band of Chippewa
    - Leech Lake Band of Pillagers
    - Removable Lake Superior Bands of Chippewa of the Chippewa Reservation
    - White Oak Point Band of Mississippi Chippewa
      - Pokegama Lake Band of Mississippi Chippewa
      - Removable Sandy Lake Band of Mississippi Chippewa
  - Mille Lacs Band of Ojibwe, Minnesota
    - Mille Lacs Indians
    - Sandy Lake Band of Mississippi Chippewa
    - Rice Lake Band of Mississippi Chippewa
    - St. Croix Band of Chippewa Indians of Minnesota
      - Kettle River Band of Chippewa Indians
      - Snake and Knife Rivers Band of Chippewa Indians
  - White Earth Band of Chippewa
    - Gull Lake Band of Mississippi Chippewa
    - Otter Tail Band of Pillagers
    - Rabbit Lake Band of Mississippi Chippewa
    - Removable Mille Lacs Indians
    - Rice Lake Band of Mississippi Chippewa
- Mississaugas of the Credit First Nation, previously Mississaugas of the New Credit First Nation
- Mississaugi First Nation, Ontario
- North Caribou Lake First Nation, Ontario
- Ojibway Nation of Saugeen First Nation, Ontario
- Ojibways of the Pic River First Nation, Ontario
- Osnaburg House Band of Ojibway and Cree (Historical)
  - Cat Lake First Nation, Ontario
  - Mishkeegogamang First Nation (formerly known as New Osnaburgh First Nation)
  - Slate Falls First Nation
- Pembina Band of Chippewa Indians (Historical)
- Pikangikum First Nation
- Poplar Hill First Nation
- Red Lake Band of Chippewa Indians
  - Lac des Bois Band of Chippewa Indians
- Rolling River First Nation
- Sagamok Anishnawbek First Nation
- Saginaw Chippewa Tribal Council
- Sagkeeng First Nation
- Sault Tribe of Chippewa Indians
- Saulteaux First Nation
- Shawanaga First Nation
- Southeast Tribal Council
  - Berens River First Nation
  - Bloodvein First Nation
  - Brokenhead First Nation
  - Buffalo Point First Nation (Saulteaux)
  - Hollow Water First Nation
  - Black River First Nation
  - Little Grand Rapids First Nation
  - Pauingassi First Nation (Saulteaux)
  - Poplar River First Nation
- Tootinaowaziibeeng Treaty Reserve
- Turtle Mountain Band of Chippewa Indians
- Wabaseemoong Independent Nation
- Wabauskang First Nation
- Wabun Tribal Council
  - Beaverhouse First Nation
  - Brunswick House First Nation
  - Chapleau Ojibwe First Nation
  - Matachewan First Nation
  - Mattagami First Nation
  - Wahgoshig First Nation
- Wabigoon Lake Ojibway Nation
- Wahnapitae First Nation
- Walpole Island First Nation
- Washagamis Bay First Nation
- Whitefish Bay First Nation
- Whitefish Lake First Nation
- Whitefish River First Nation
- Whitesand First Nation
- Whitewater Lake First Nation
- Wikwemikong First Nation

== Notable historical Ojibwe people ==
Ojibwe people from the 20th and 21st centuries should be listed under their specific tribes.

- Francis Assikinack (1824–1863), historian from Manitoulin Island
- Stephen Bonga, Ojibwe/African-American fur trader and interpreter
- Shadawish first Ojibwe in Wisconsin.
- Madeline Cadotte
- George Bonga (1802–1880), Ojibwe/African-American fur trader and interpreter
- Jeanne L'Strange Cappel (1873–1949), writer, teacher and clubwoman
- Hanging Cloud, 19th c. Lac Courte Oreilles Ojibwe woman warrior
- George Copway (1818–1869), missionary and writer
- Margaret Bonga Fahlstrom (c. 1797–1880), Ojibwe-African American woman in the early Methodist Episcopal Church in Minnesota
- Fr. Philip B. Gordon (1885–1948), Roman Catholic priest and activist from Gordon, Wisconsin
- Hole in the Day (1825–1868), Chief of the Mississippi Band of the Minnesota Ojibwe
- Peter Jones (1802–1856), Mississauga missionary and writer
- Kechewaishke (Gichi-Weshkiinh, Buffalo) (ca. 1759–1855), chief
- Edmonia Lewis (ca. 1844–1907), Mississauga Ojibwe/African-American sculptor
- Maungwudaus, (1811–1888), performer, interpreter, mission worker, and herbalist
- Medweganoonind, 19th-century Red Lake Ojibwe chief
- O-saw-wah-pon, early 19th century, leader of the Saginaw band
- Ozaawindib (Yellow Head), early 19th c. nonbinary warrior, guide
- Chief Bender Early baseball pitcher with a career 2.46 ERA and a .625 winning percentage.
- Chief Rocky Boy (fl. late 19th c.), chief
- Jane Johnston Schoolcraft (1800–1842), author, wife of Henry Rowe Schoolcraft, born in Sault Ste. Marie
- John Smith (ca. 1824–1922, chief, from Cass Lake, Minnesota
- Alfred Michael "Chief" Venne (1879–1971), athletic manager and coach from Leroy, North Dakota
- Waabaanakwad (White Cloud) (ca. 1830–1898), Gull Lake chief
- William Whipple Warren (1825–1853), first historical writer of the Ojibwe people, territorial legislator
- Zheewegonab (fl. 1780–1805), band leader among the northern Ojibwe

== Ojibwe treaties ==
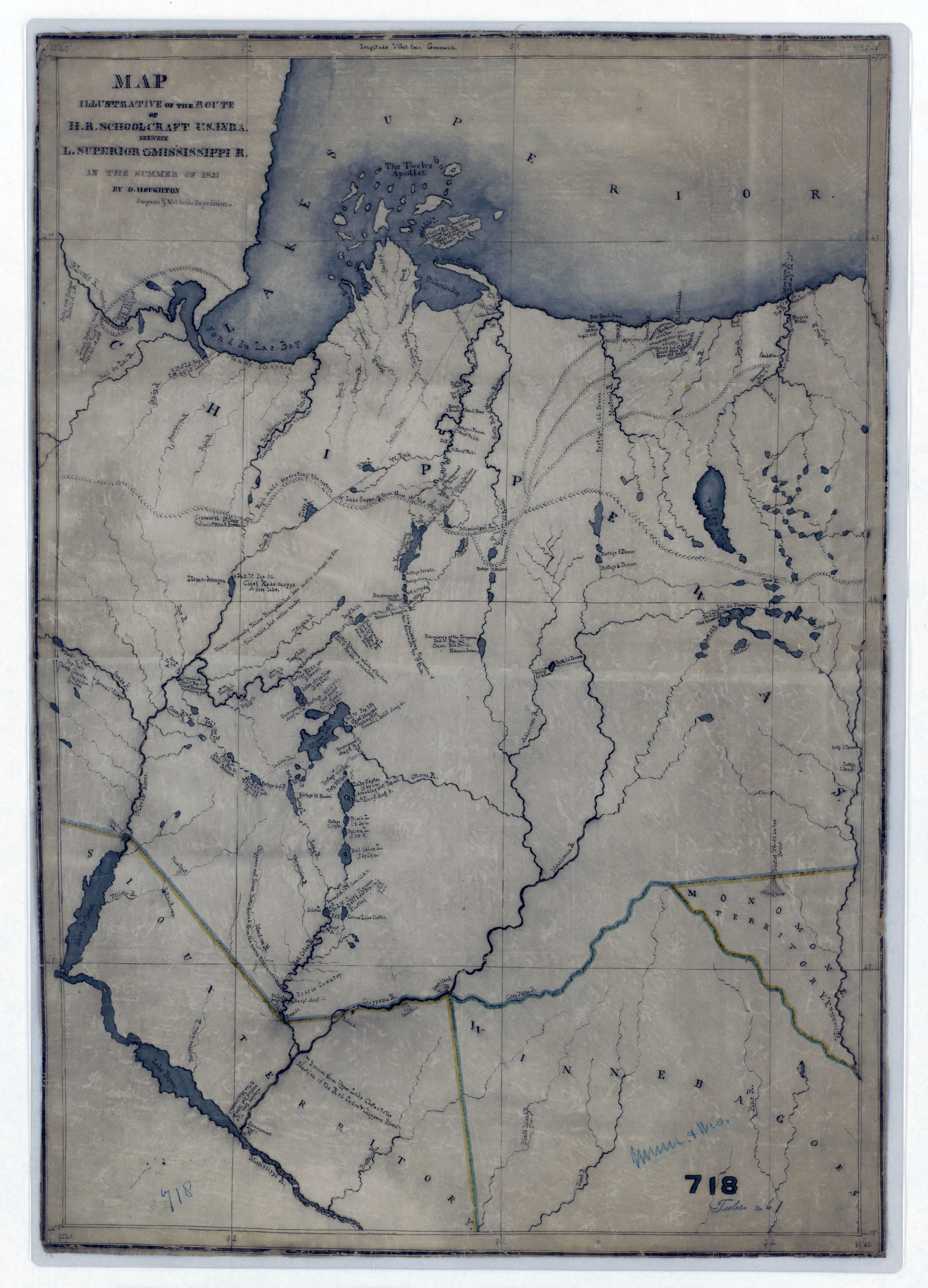
Map of Schoolcraft's route in 1831 showing Ojibwe settlements and roads (NAID 102278798)

- Chippewa Ottawa Resource Authority – 1836CT fisheries
- Grand Council of Treaty 3 – Treaty 3
- Grand Council of Treaty 8 – Treaty 8
- Great Lakes Indian Fish & Wildlife Commission – 1837CT, 1836CT, 1842CT and 1854CT
- Nishnawbe Aski Nation – Treaty 5 and Treaty 9
- Red Lake Band of Chippewa – 1886CT and 1889CT
- Union of Ontario Indians – RS, RH1, RH2, misc. pre-confederation treaties

Treaties with France

- La Grande Paix de Montréal (1701)

Treaties with Great Britain and the United Kingdom

- Treaty of Fort Niagara (1764)
- Treaty of Fort Niagara (1781)
- Indian Officers' Land Treaty (1783)
- The Crawford Purchases (1783)
- Between the Lakes Purchase (1784)
- Treaty of Peace with Sioux, Chippewa and Winnebago (1787)
- Toronto Purchase (1787)
  - Indenture to the Toronto Purchase (1805)
- The McKee Purchase (1790)
- Between the Lakes Purchase (1792)
- Chenail Ecarte (Sombra Township) Purchase (1796)
- London Township Purchase (1796)
- Land for Joseph Brant (1797)
- Penetanguishene Bay Purchase (1798)
- St. Joseph Island (1798)
- Head-of-the-Lake Purchase (1806)
- Lake Simcoe-Lake Huron Purchase (1815)
- Lake Simcoe-Nottawasaga Purchase (1818)
- Ajetance Purchase (1818)
- Rice Lake Purchase (1818)
- The Rideau Purchase (1819)
- Long Woods Purchase (1822)
- Huron Tract Purchase (1827)
- Saugeen Tract Agreement (1836)
- Manitoulin Agreement (1836)
- The Robinson Treaties
  - Ojibewa Indians of Lake Superior (1850)
  - Ojibewa Indians of Lake Huron (1850)
- Manitoulin Island Treaty (1862)

Treaties with Canada

- Treaty No. 1 (1871) – Stone Fort Treaty
- Treaty No. 2 (1871)
- Treaty No. 3 (1873) – Northwest Angle Treaty
- Treaty No. 4 (1874) – Qu'Appelle Treaty
- Treaty No. 5 (1875)
- Treaty No. 6 (1876)
- Treaty No. 8 (1899)
- Treaty No. 9 (1905–1906) – James Bay Treaty
- Treaty No. 5, Adhesions (1908–1910)
- The Williams Treaties (1923)
  - The Chippewa Indians
  - The Mississauga Indians
- Treaty No. 9, Adhesions (1929–1930)

Treaties with the United States

- Treaty of Fort McIntosh (1785)
- Treaty of Fort Harmar (1789)
- Treaty of Greenville (1795)
- Fort Industry (1805)
- Treaty of Detroit (1807)
- Treaty of Brownstown (1808)
- Treaty of Springwells (1815)
- Treaty of St. Louis (1816) – Ottawa, Ojibwe, and Potawatomi
- Treaty of Miami Rapids (1817)
- Treaty of St. Mary's (1818)
- Treaty of Saginaw (1819)
- Treaty of Saúlt Ste. Marie (1820)
- Treaty of L'Arbre Croche and Michilimackinac (1820)
- Treaty of Chicago (1821)
- First Treaty of Prairie du Chien (1825)
- Treaty of Fond du Lac (1826)
- Treaty of Butte des Morts (1827)
- Treaty of Green Bay (1828)
- Second Treaty of Prairie du Chien (1829)
- Treaty of Chicago (1833)
- Treaty of Washington (1836) – Ottawa & Chippewa
- Treaty of Washington (1836) – Swan Creek & Black River Bands
- Treaty of Detroit (1837)
- Treaty of St. Peters (1837) – White Pine Treaty
- Treaty of Flint River (1837)
- Saganaw Treaties
  - Treaty of Saganaw (1838)
  - Supplemental Treaty (1839)
- Treaty of La Pointe (1842) – Copper Treaty
  - Isle Royale Agreement (1844)
- Treaty of Potawatomi Creek (1846)
- Treaty of Fond du Lac (1847)
- Treaty of Leech Lake (1847)
- Treaty of La Pointe (1854)
- Treaty of Washington (1855)
- Treaty of Detroit (1855) – Ottawa & Chippewa
- Treaty of Detroit (1855) – Sault Ste. Marie Band
- Treaty of Detroit (1855) – Swan Creek & Black River Bands
- Treaty of Sac and Fox Agency (1859)
- Treaty of Washington (1863)
- Treaty of Old Crossing (1863)
- Treaty of Old Crossing (1864)
- Treaty of Washington (1864)
- Treaty of Isabella Reservation (1864)
- Treaty of Washington (1866)
- Treaty of Washington (1867)

== Gallery ==
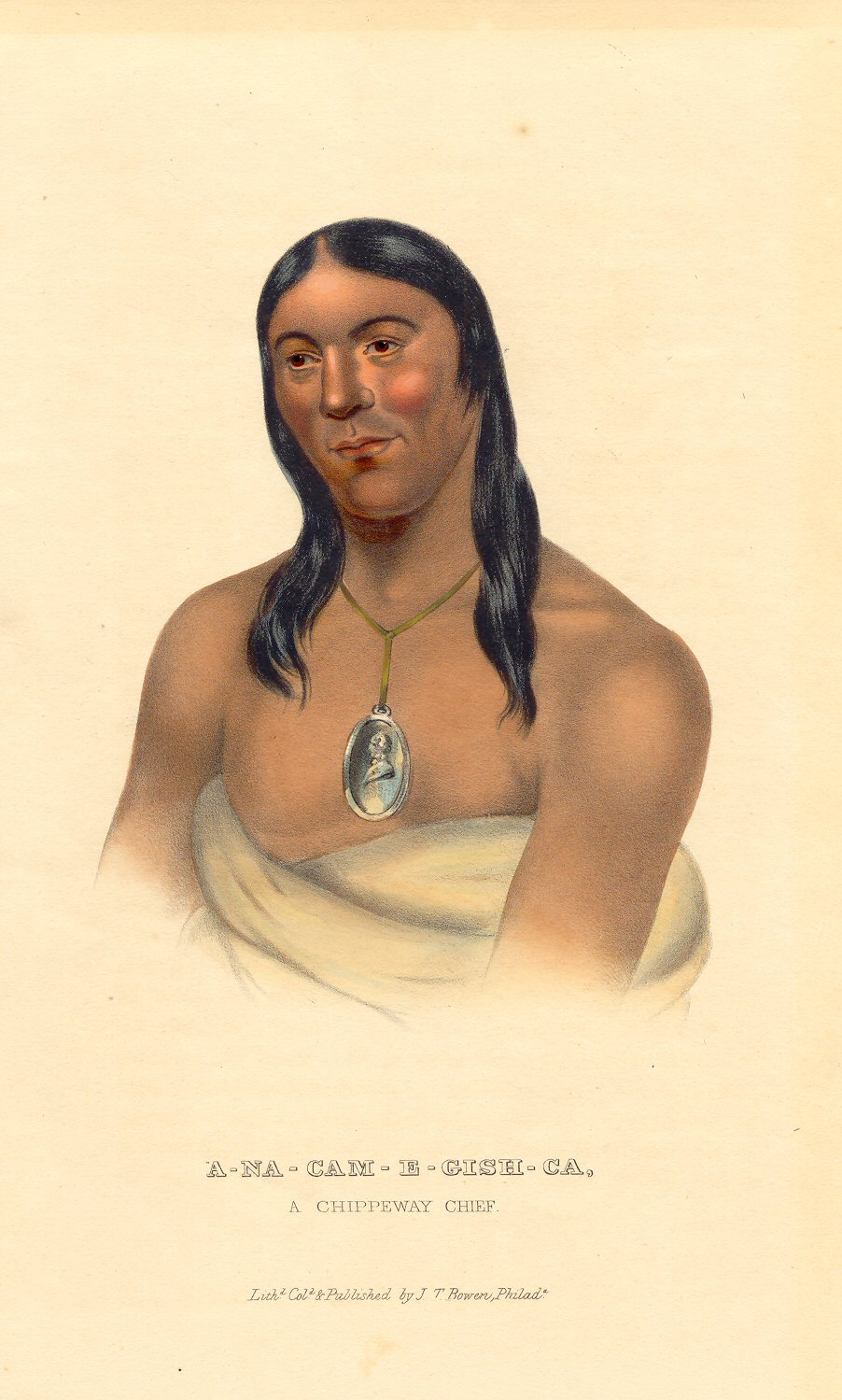
A-na-cam-e-gish-ca (Aanakamigishkaang/"[Traces of] Foot Prints [upon the Ground]"), Ojibwe chief, from History of the Indian Tribes of North America

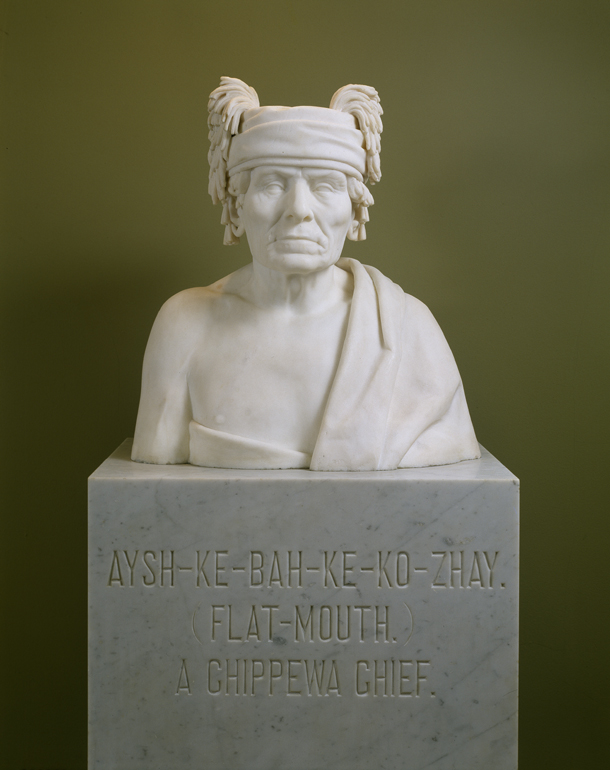
Bust of Aysh-ke-bah-ke-ko-zhay (Eshkibagikoonzhe or "Flat Mouth"), a Leech Lake Ojibwe chief

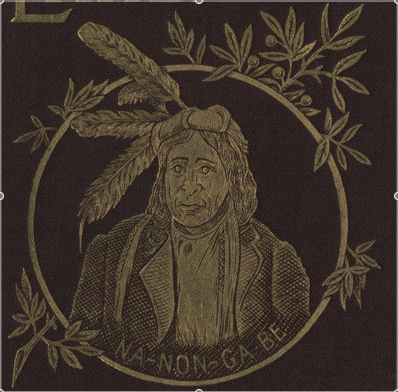
Chief Beautifying Bird (Nenaa'angebi), by Benjamin Armstrong, 1891

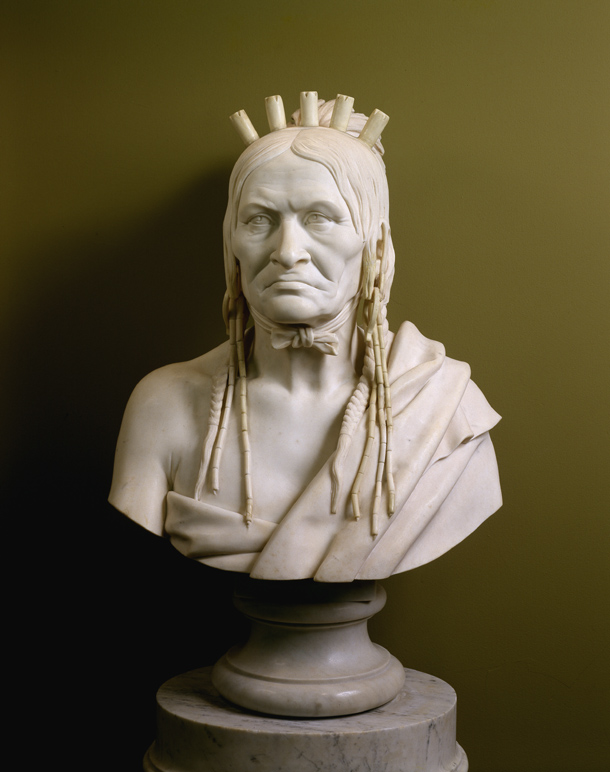
Bust of Beshekee, war chief, modeled 1855, carved 1856

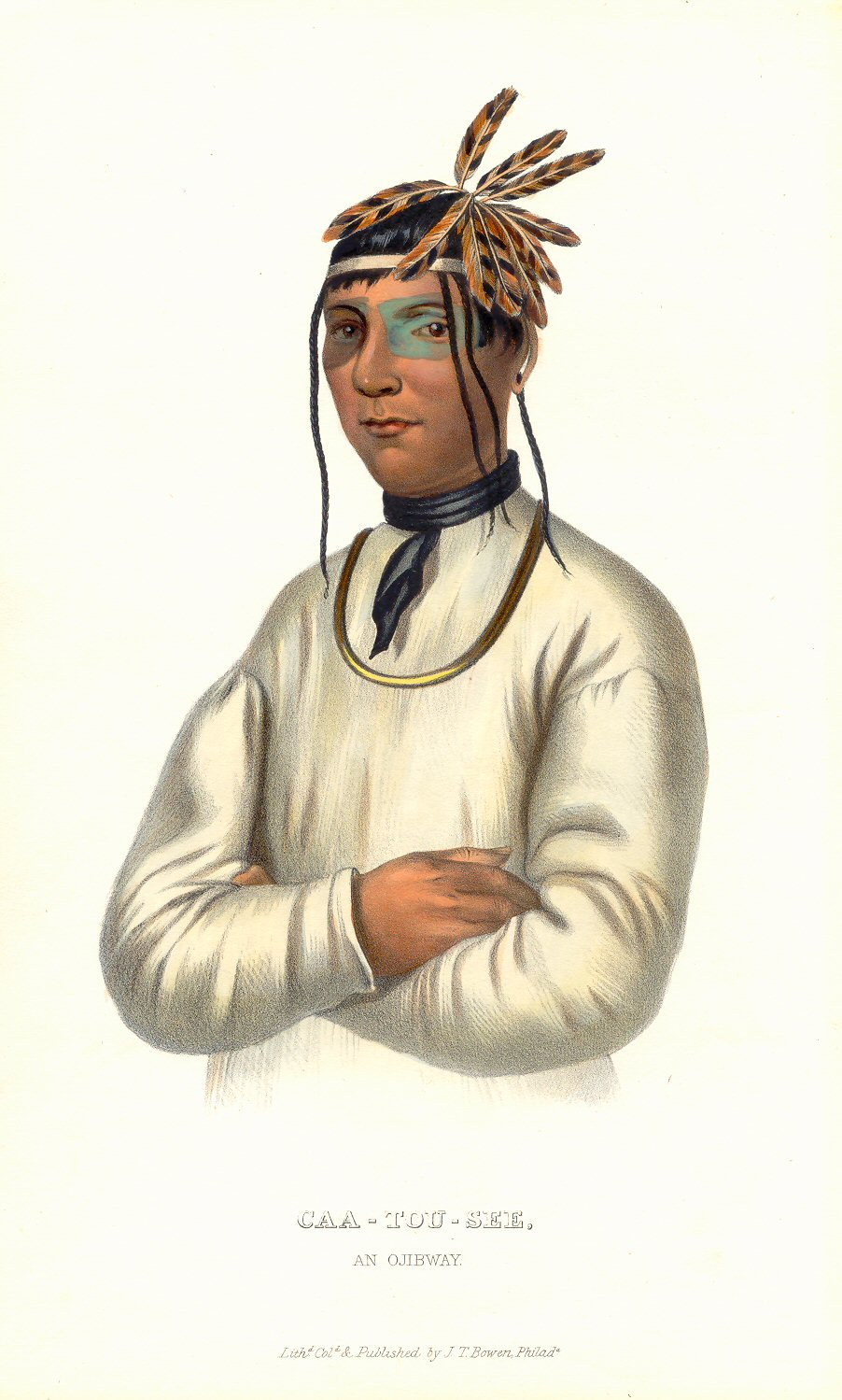
Caa-tou-see, an Ojibwe, from History of the Indian Tribes of North America

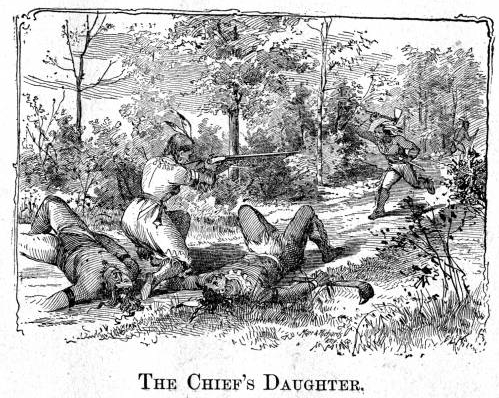
Hanging Cloud, The female Ojibwe warrior the newspapers called the Chippewa Warrior Princess

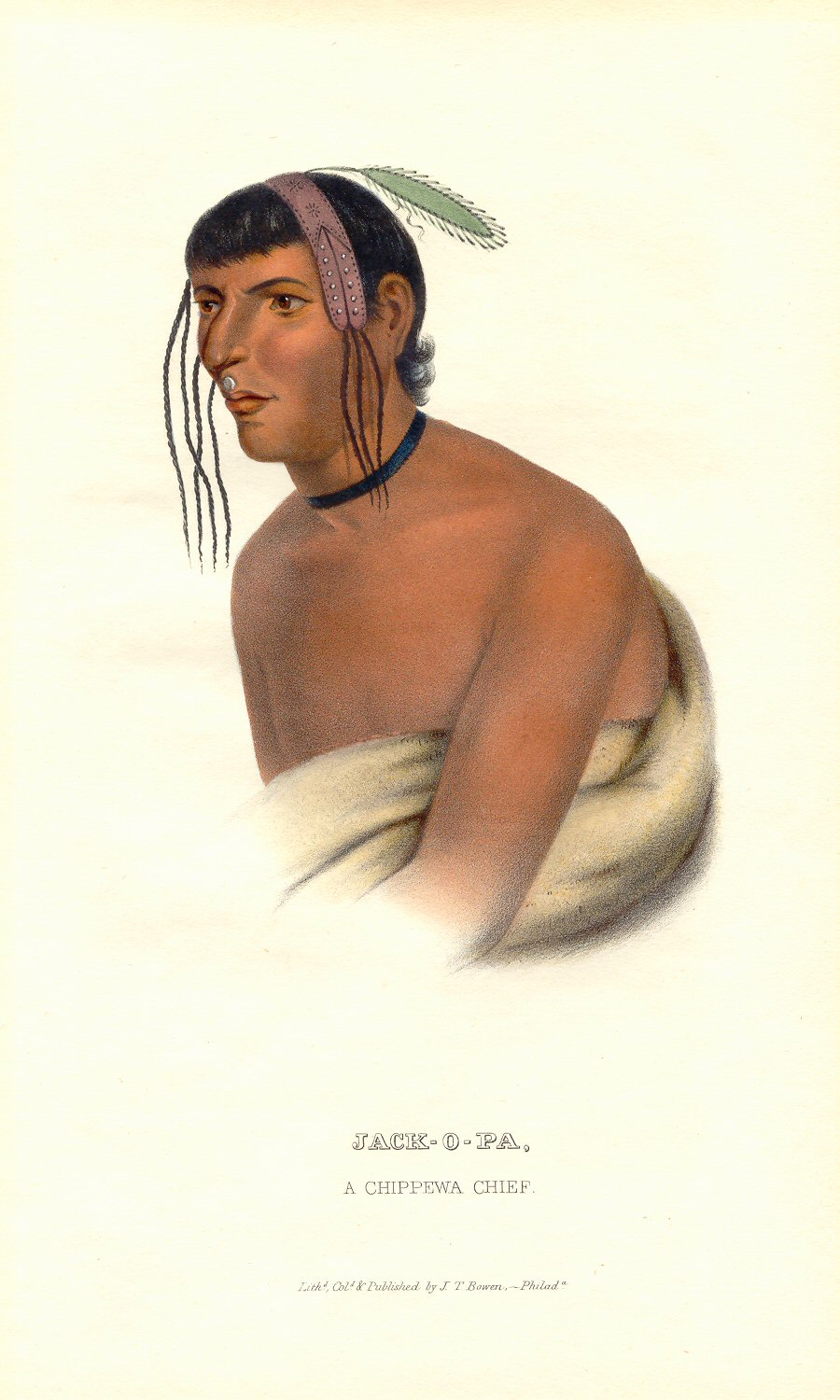
Jack-O-Pa (Zhaagobe/"Six"), a St. Croix Ojibwe chief, from History of the Indian Tribes of North America

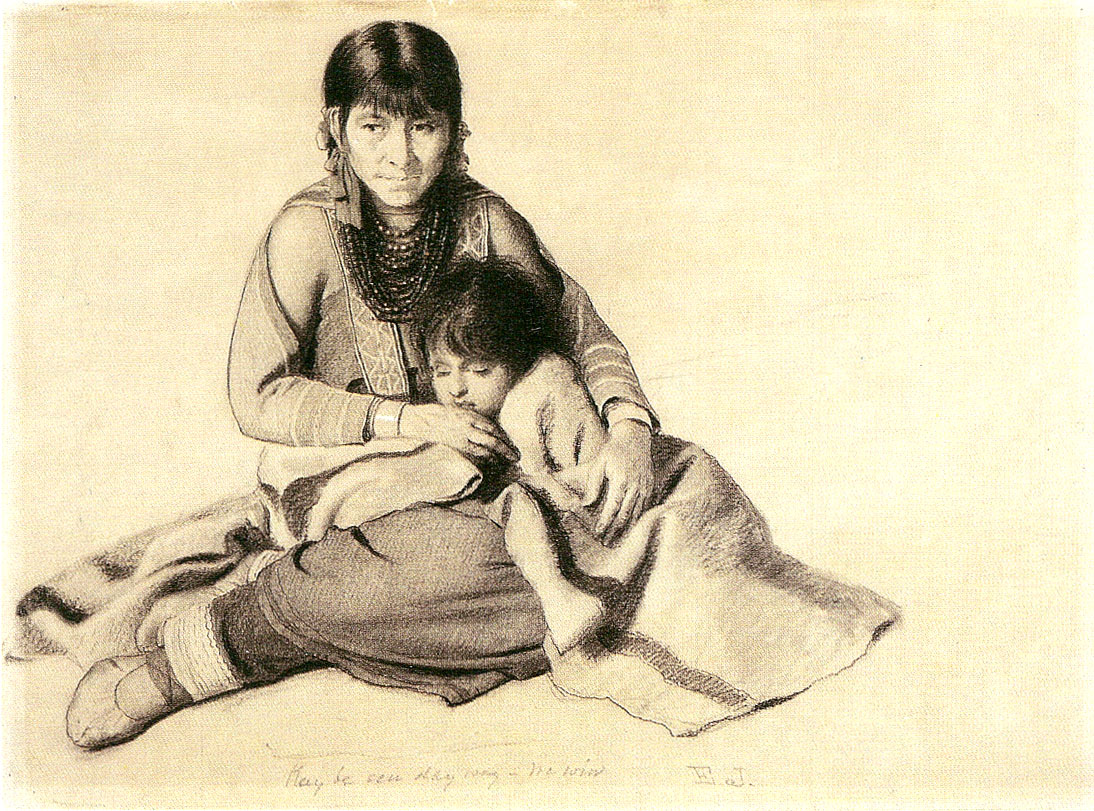
Kay be sen day way We Win, by Eastman Johnson, 1857

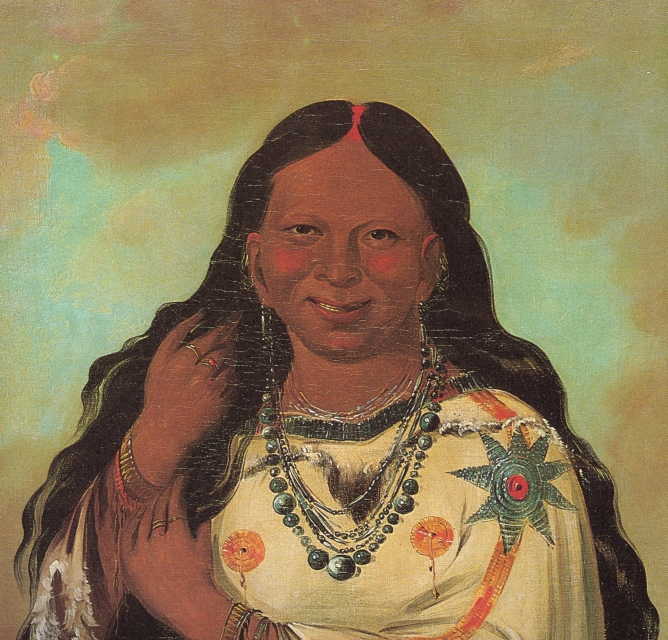
Kei-a-gis-gis, a Plains Ojibwe woman, painted by George Catlin

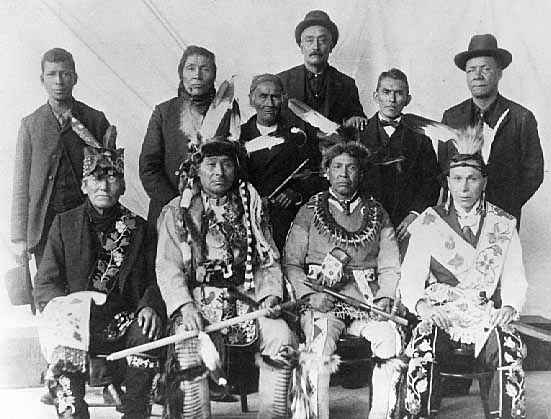
Leech Lake Ojibwe delegation to Washington, 1899

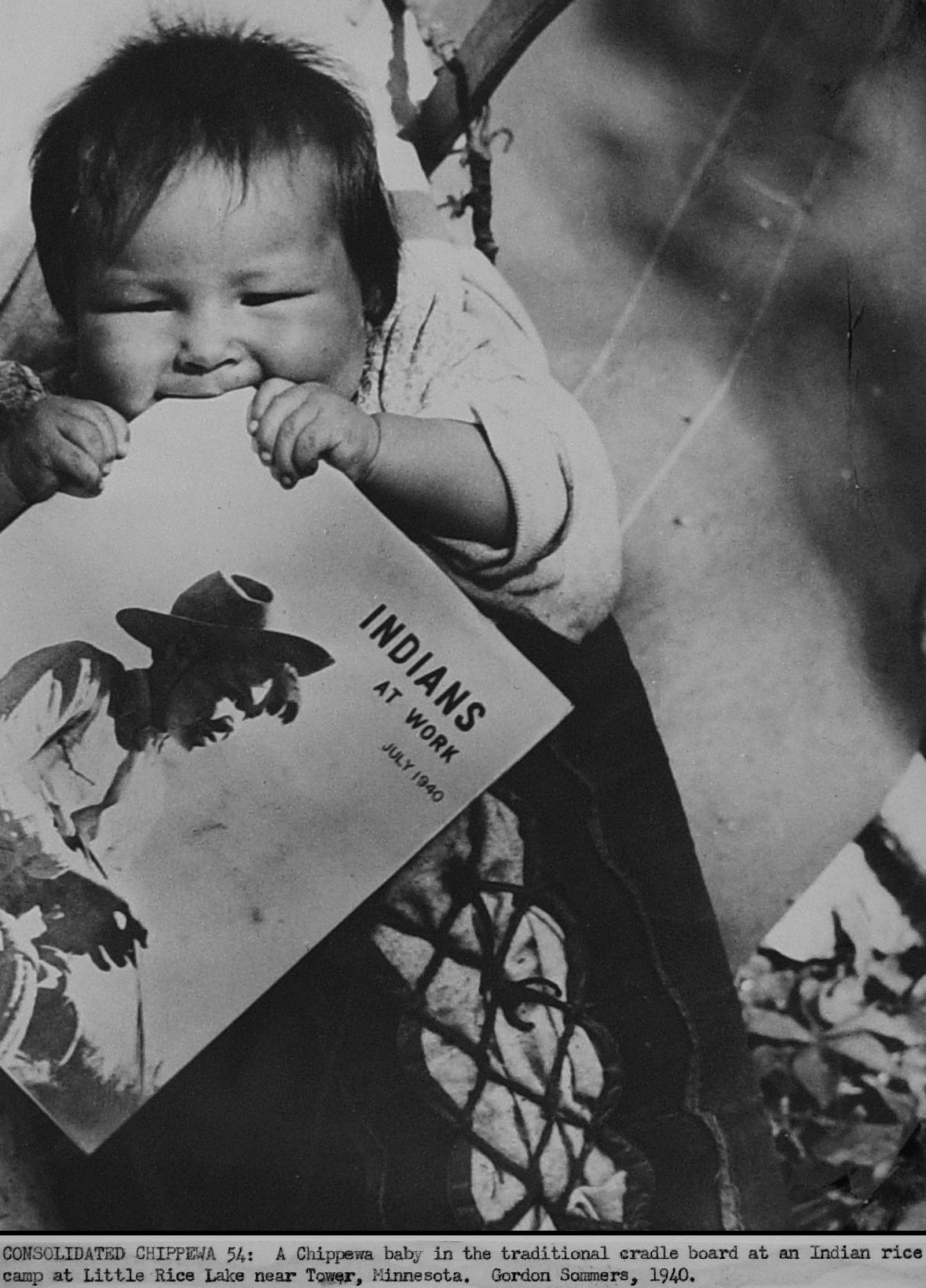
Chippewa baby teething on "Indians at Work" magazine while strapped to a cradleboard at a rice lake in 1940.

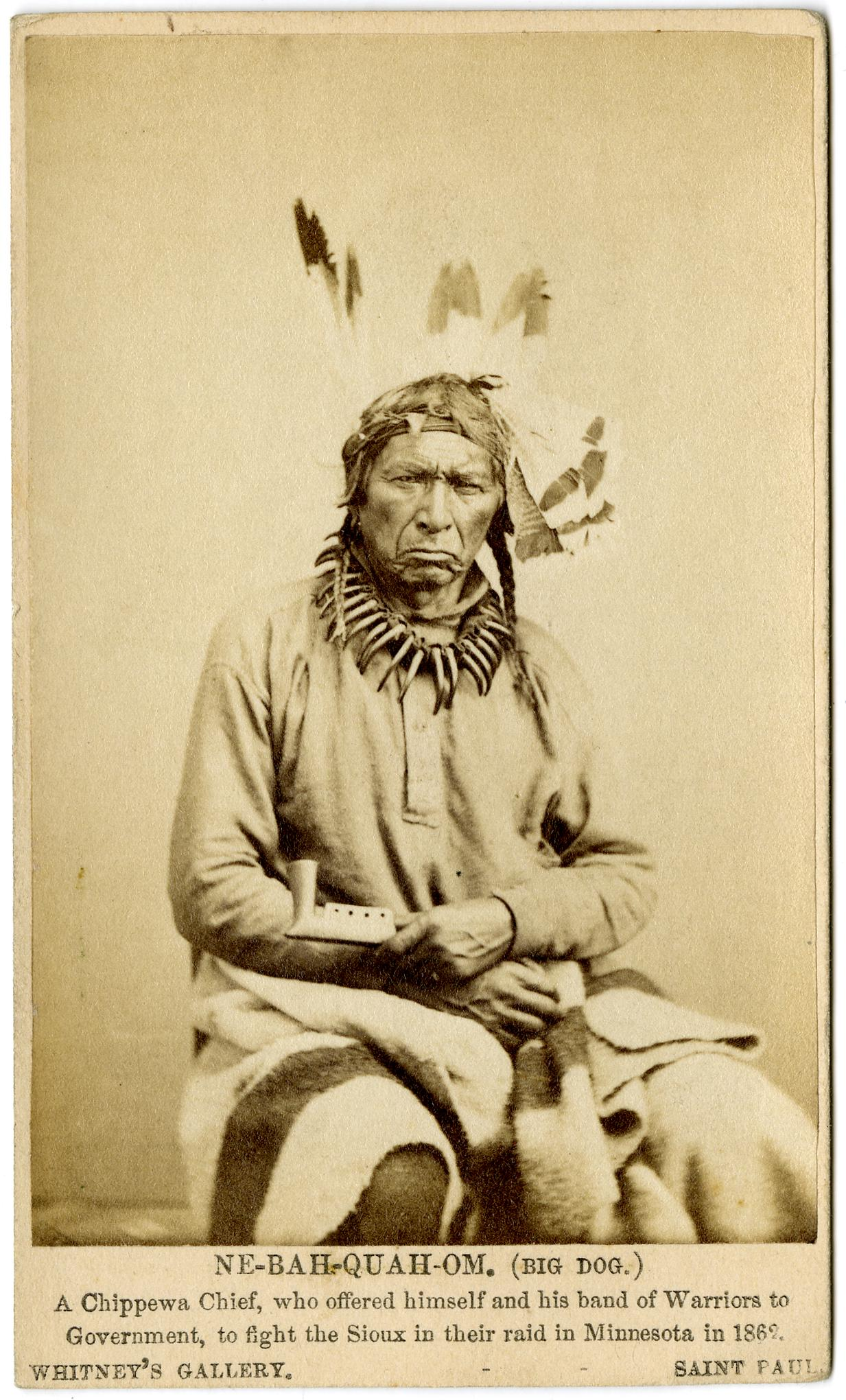
Chippewa Chief Ne-bah-quah-om (Big Dog) offered to fight the Sioux for the government in 1862

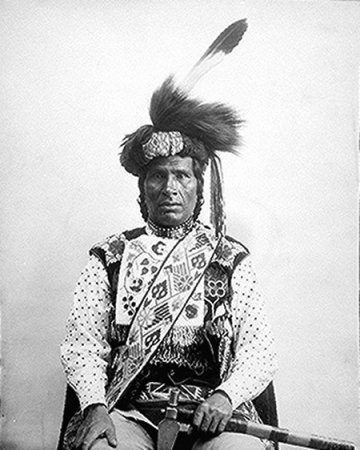
"One Called From A Distance" (Midwewinind) of the White Earth Band, 1894.

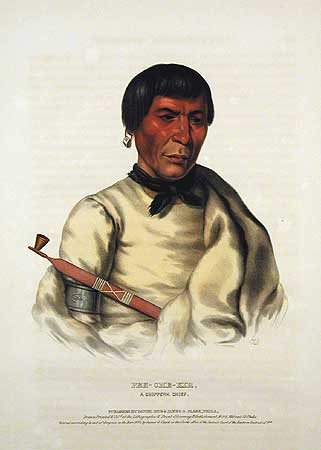
Pee-Che-Kir, Ojibwe chief, painted by Thomas Loraine McKenney, 1843

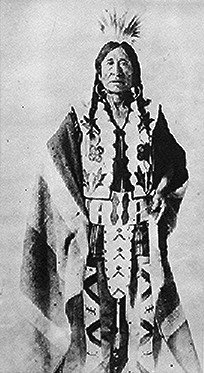
Ojibwe chief Rocky Boy

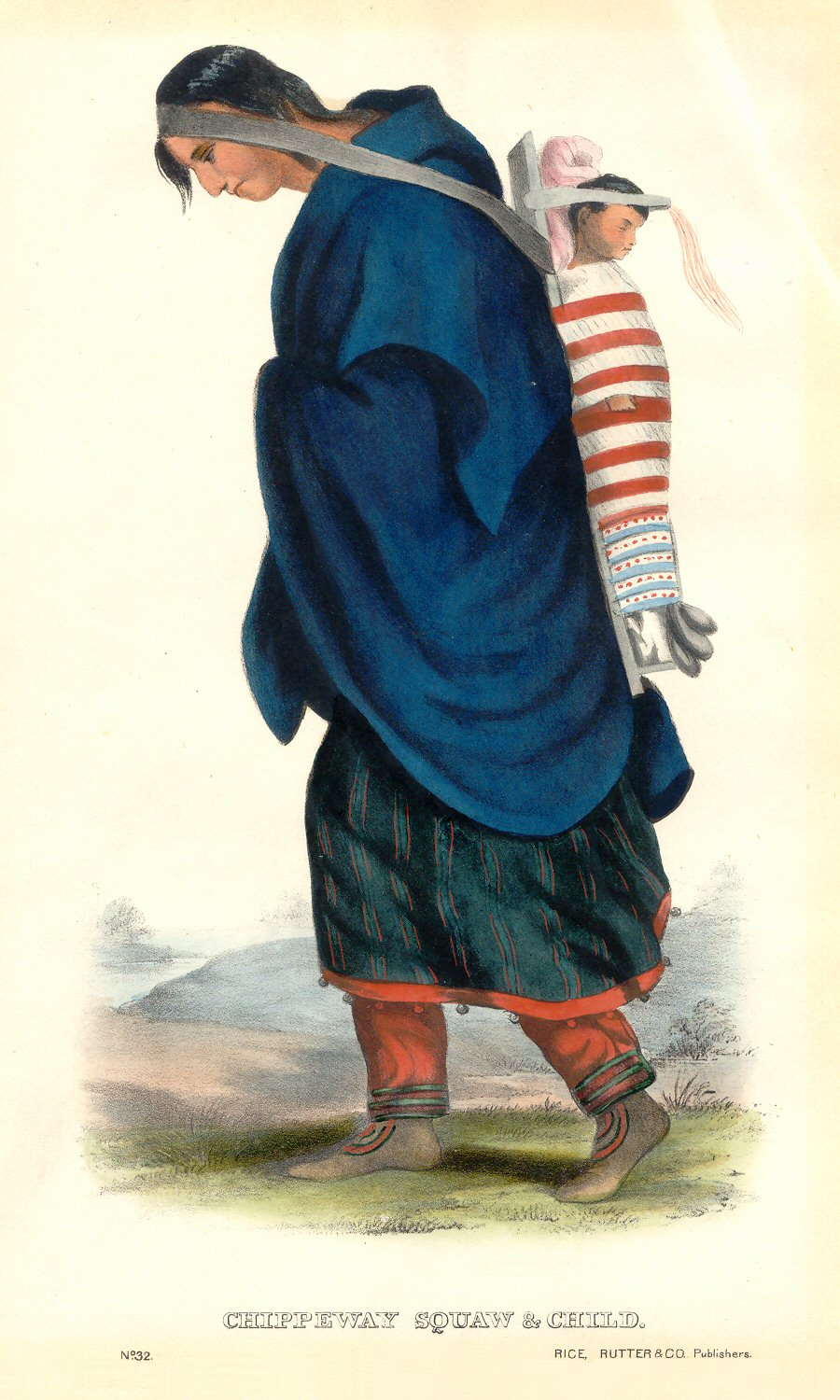
Ojibwe woman and child, from History of the Indian Tribes of North America

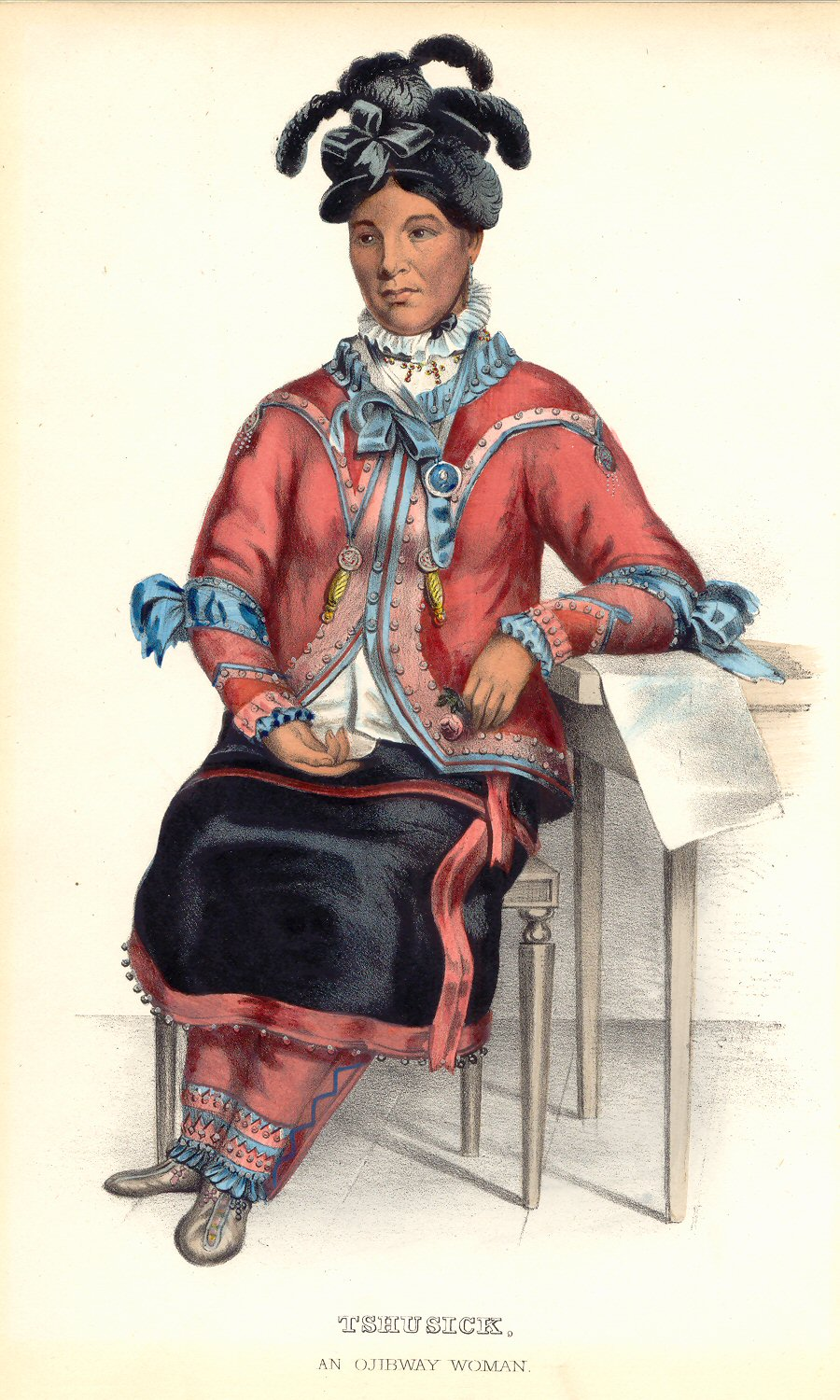
Tshusick, an Ojibwe woman, from History of the Indian Tribes of North America

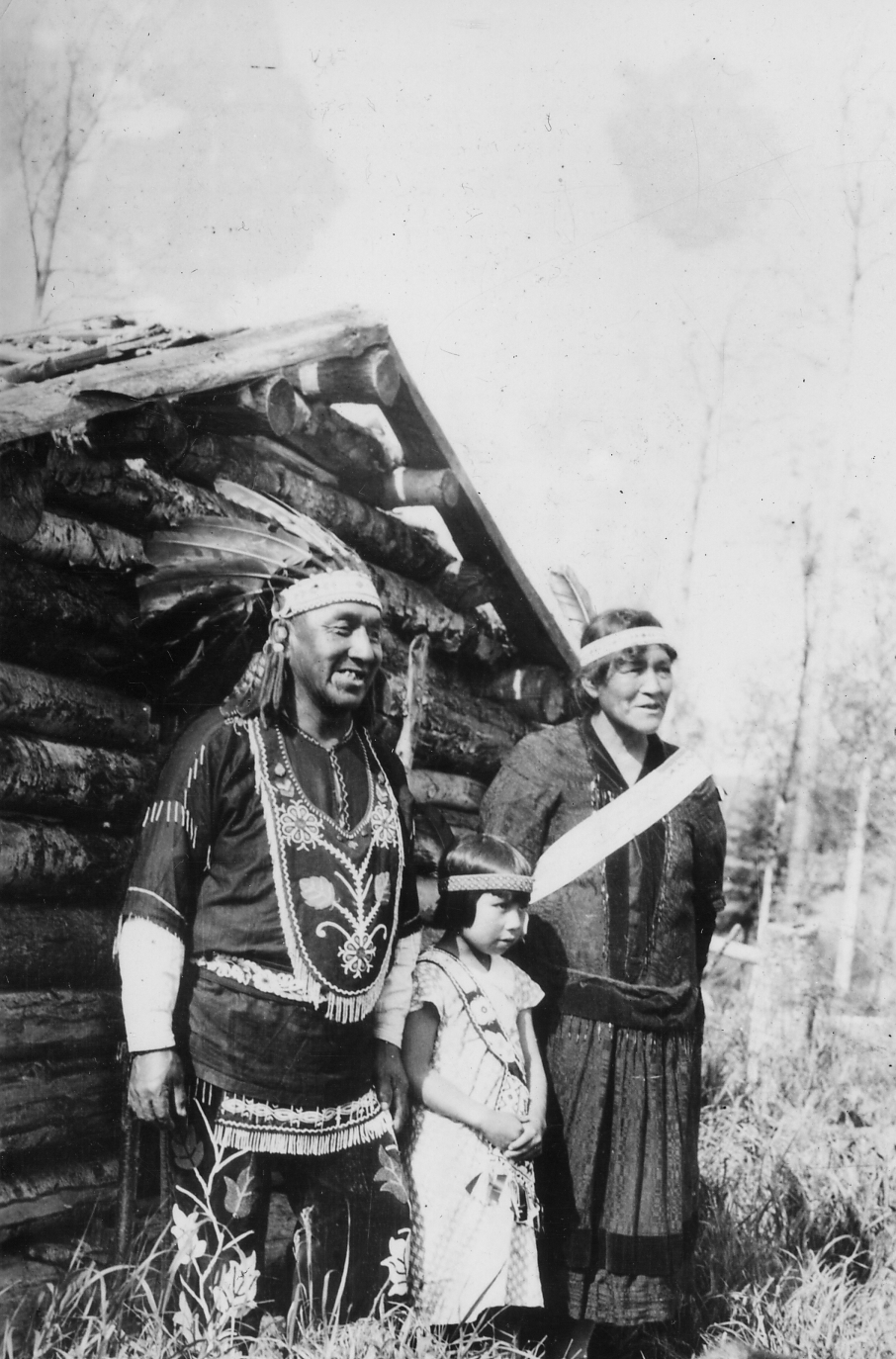
Chief medicine man Axel Pasey and family at Grand Portage Minnesota.

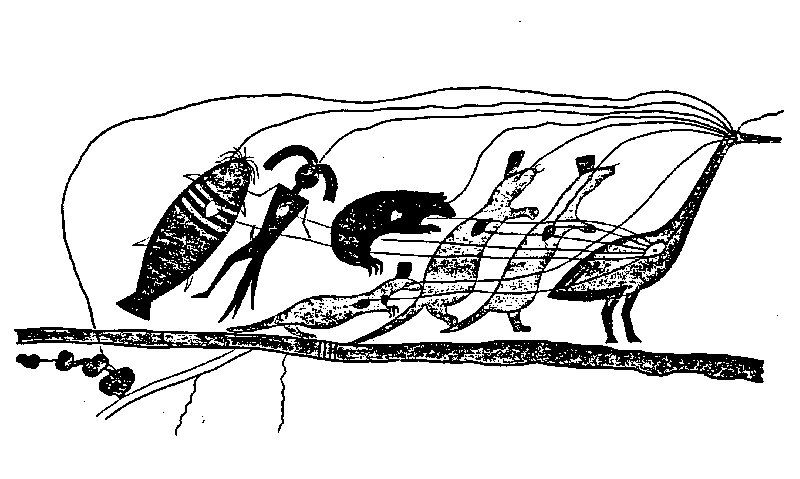
Historic 1849 petition of Ojibwe chiefs

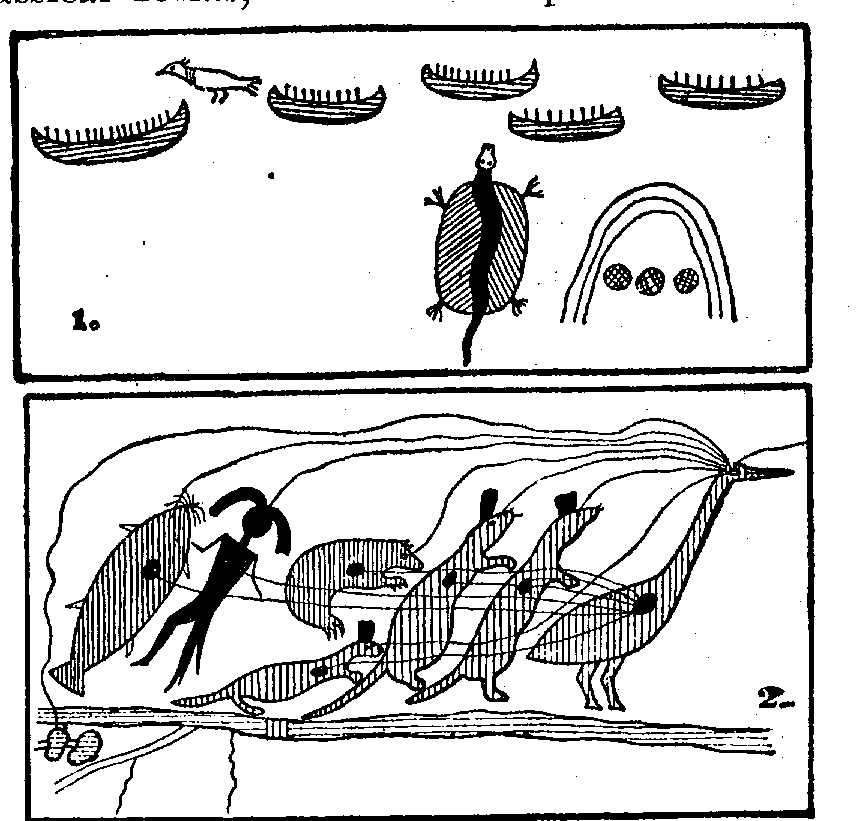
Wells American Indian picture writing

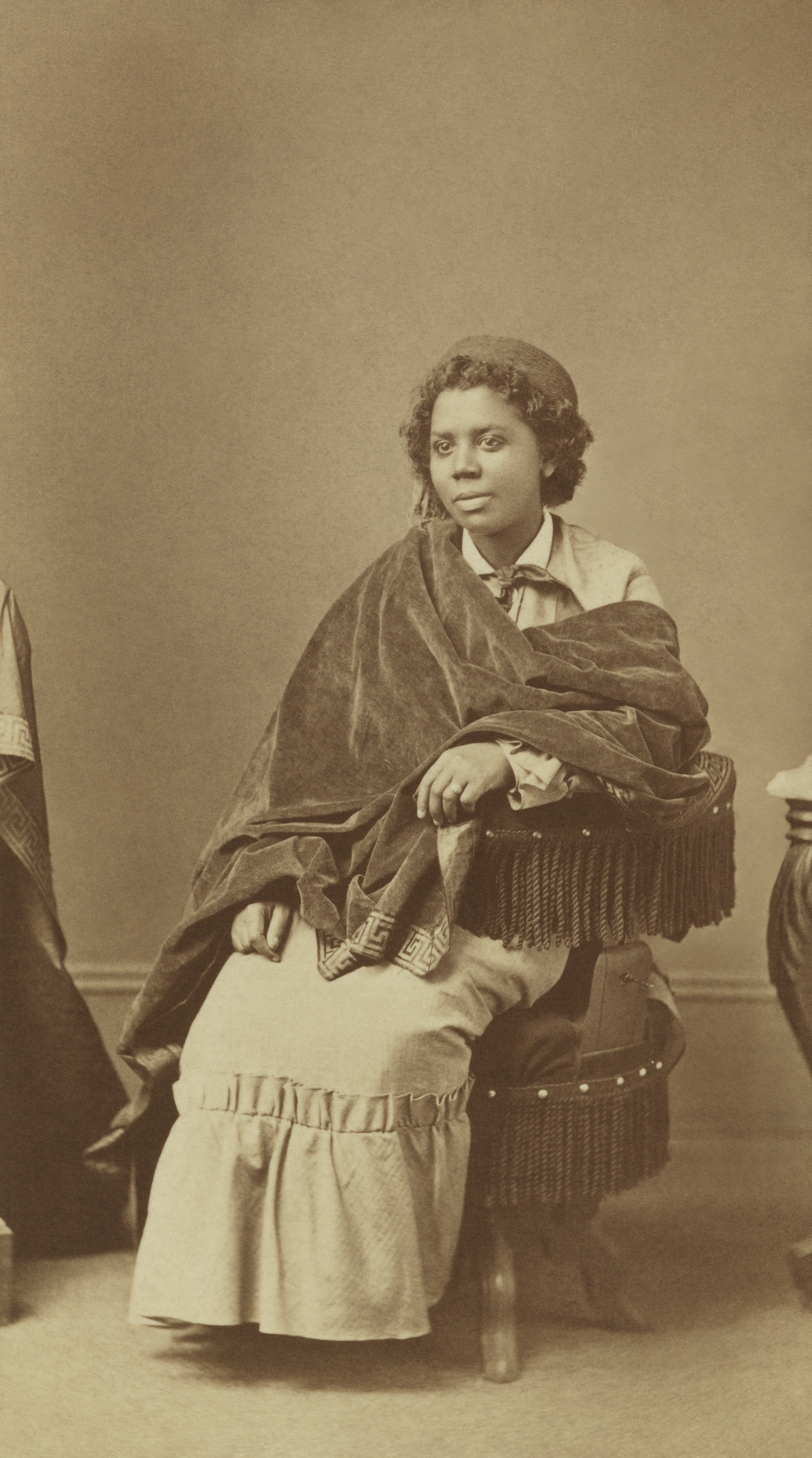
Wildfire, English name Edmonia Lewis

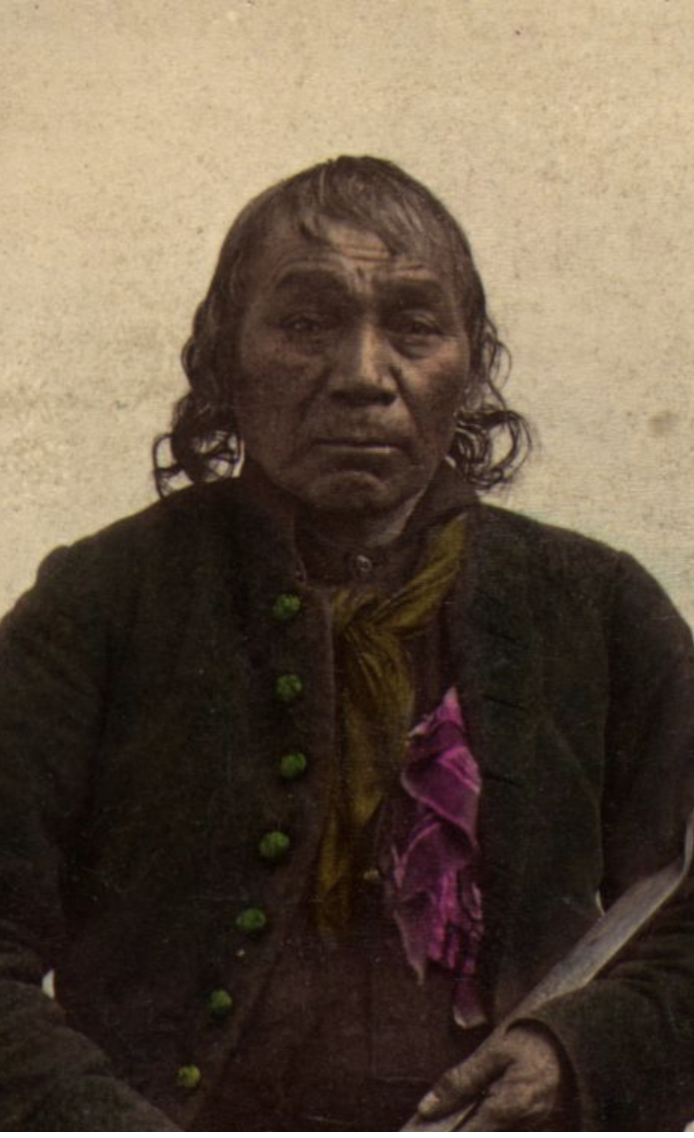
Aamoons, chief of La Flambeau band, photographed c. 1862, possibly in Washington, D.C.

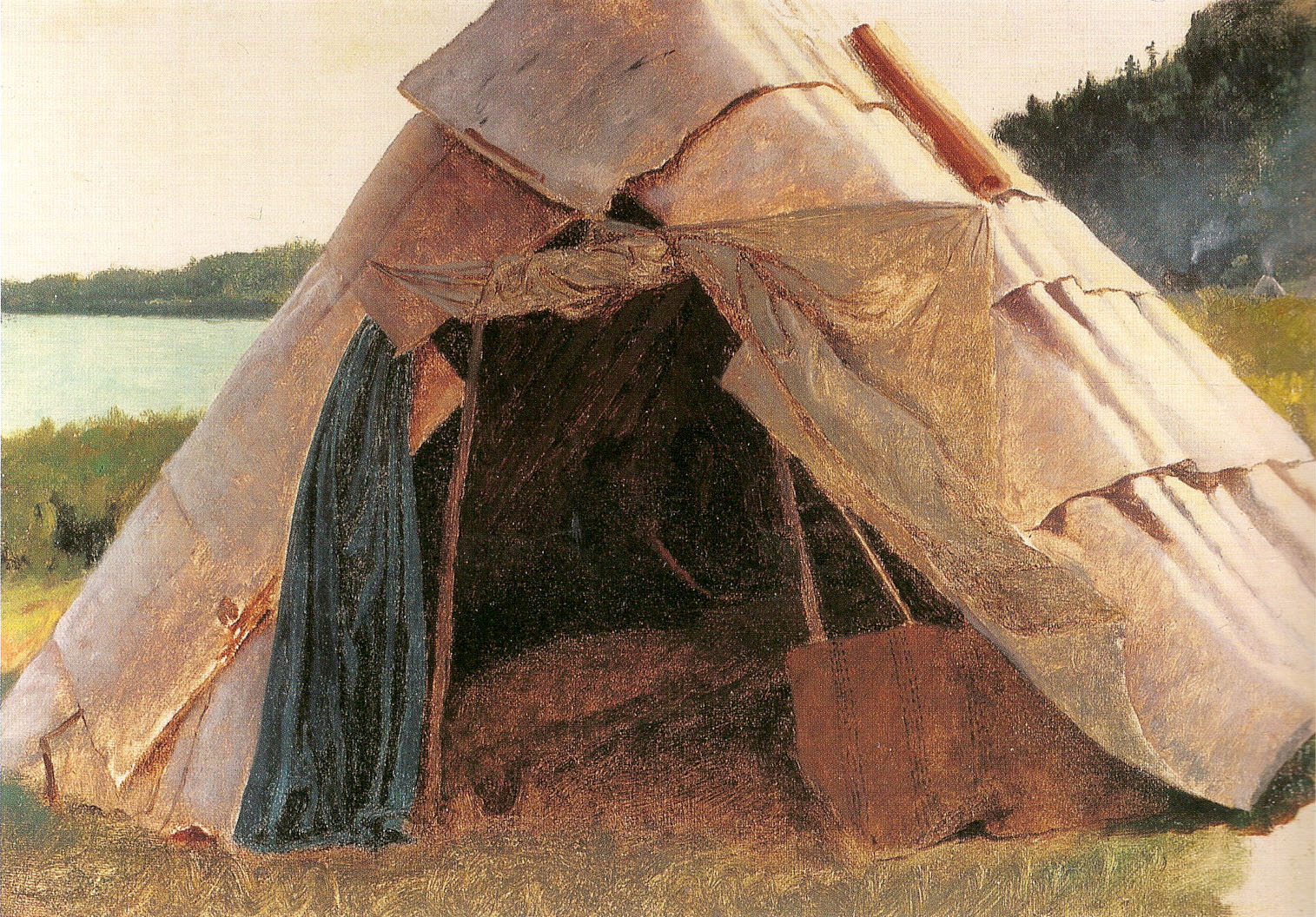
Details of Ojibwe Wigwam at Grand Portage by Eastman Johnson, c. 1906

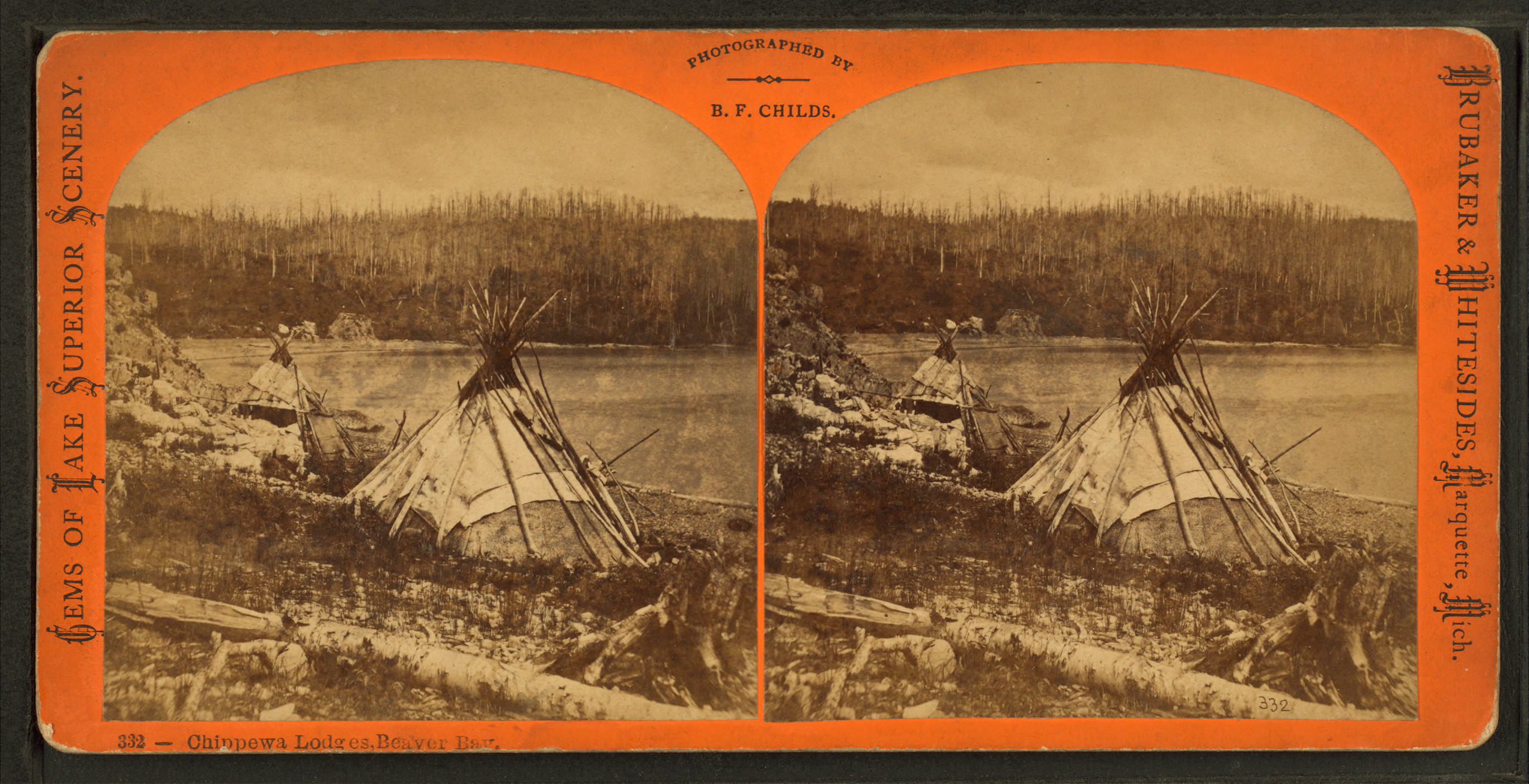
Vintage stereoscopic photo entitled "Chippewa lodges, Beaver Bay, by Childs, B. F."

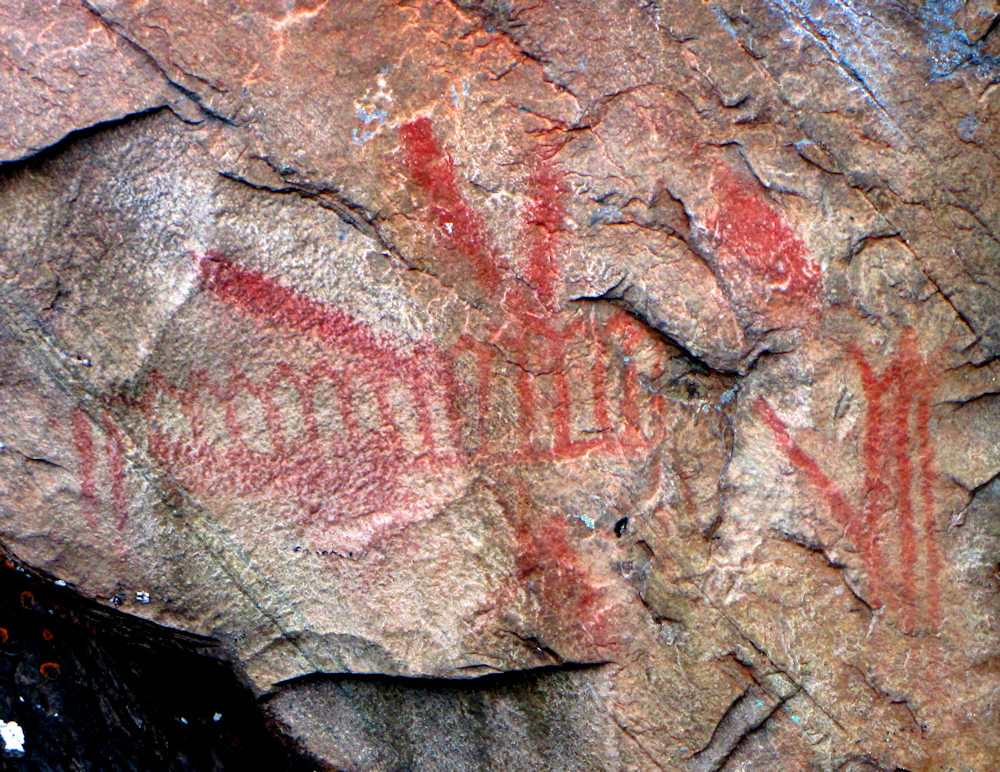
Pictographs on Mazinaw Rock, Bon Echo Provincial Park, Ontario

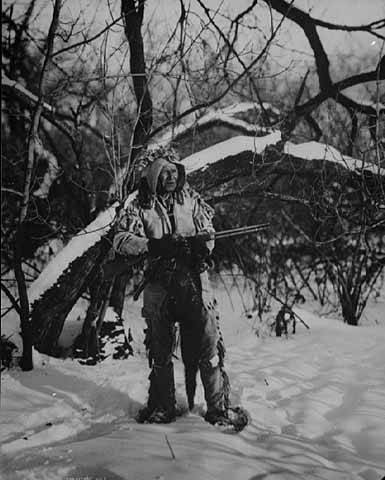
Ojibwe hunter in winter 1908

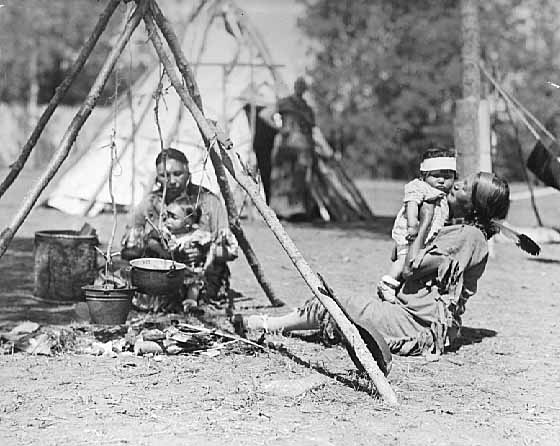
Camp fire Chippewa village Itasca State Park Minnesota 1926

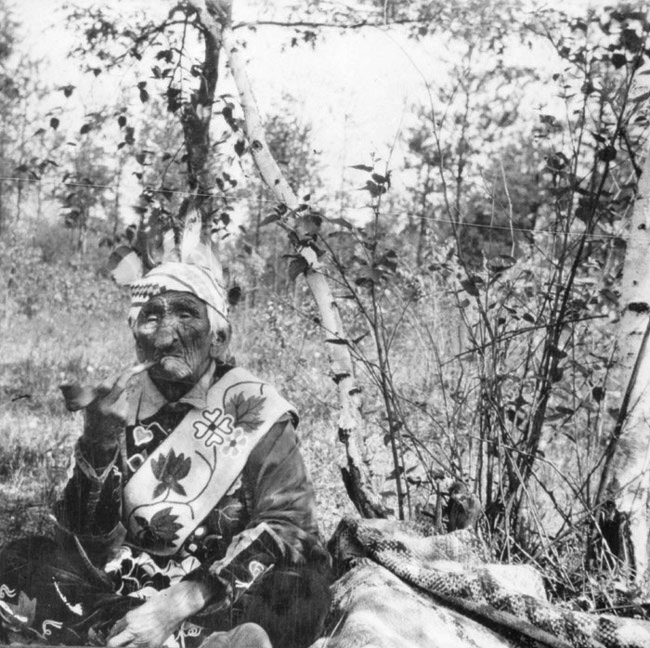
Medicine man from Cass Lake 1911

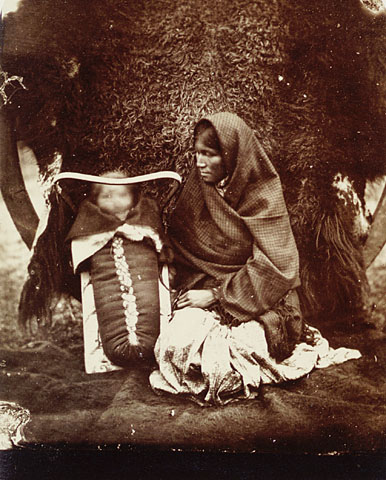
An Ojibwa woman and child, Red River Settlement, Manitoba, 1895

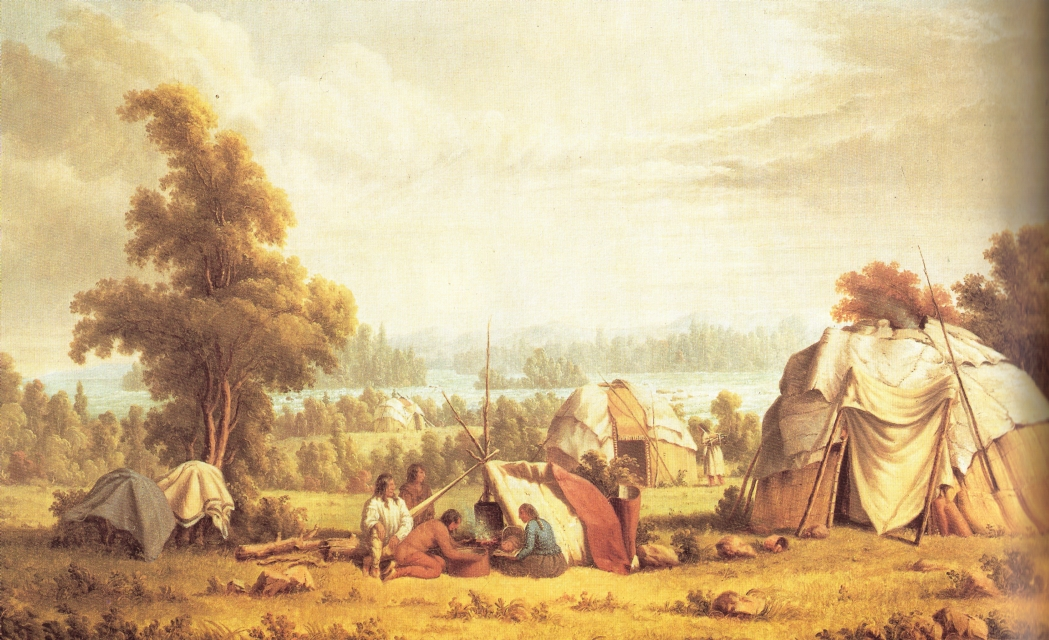
Ojibwa village

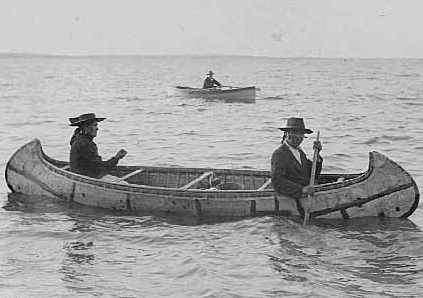
Minnesota Ojibwa 1910

== See also ==
- Amikwa people
- Timeline of First Nations history
- History of Native Americans in the United States
- Indian removals in Minnesota
