= Waunetta McClellan Dominic =

Native American civil rights activist

- Born: Waunetta G. McClellan; July 23, 1921; Petoskey, Michigan
- Died: December 21, 1981 (aged 60); Petoskey, Michigan
- Other names: Waunetta McClellan, Waunetta Dominic
- Occupation: Native American rights activist
- Years active: 1948–1981
- Known for: co-founding the Northern Michigan Ottawa Association

Waunetta McClellan Dominic (23 July 1921 – 21 December 1981) was an Odawa rights activist who spent her career advocating for the United States government to adhere to its treaty obligations to Native Americans. She was one of the founders of the Northern Michigan Ottawa Association and her influence was widely recognized, especially after winning a 1971 claim against the government for compensation under 19th-century treaties. She was also a proponent of Native American fishing rights being protected. In 1979, she was named by The Detroit News as "Michiganian of the Year" and in 1996, she was posthumously inducted into the Michigan Women's Hall of Fame.

== Early life ==
Waunetta G. McClellan was born on 23 July 1921 in Petoskey, Michigan to Elizabeth (née Taylor) and Levi P. McClellan. Her great-grandfather was a leader of the Grand River Band of Ottawas. She initially attended school in Petoskey and completed her studies at the Haskell Institute in Lawrence, Kansas. Marrying Robert Dominic in 1940, the couple made their home in Detroit and Flint, before returning to Petoskey in 1944.

== Career ==
The Indian termination policy established by the federal government in the 1940s created the Indian Claims Commission in 1946, as a means of compensating tribes for previous land takings, undervaluations of compensation, and abridgement of rights. The problem for the Odawa was that the 1855 Treaty of Detroit had been interpreted as severing the tribal governments of each of the bands. To be eligible for filing a claim, they first had to confirm that the bands had "continued to be distinct, self-governing nations". In 1946, the Dominics called for a meeting of local tribes at the local Petoskey grocery store. Only 20 members showed up, making them realize the need to organize. Traveling throughout the state to document descendants of Odawa listed on the Durant Roll (1907–1910), they identified 3,000 American Indians who might be eligible to pursue claims against the U. S. government. In 1948, Dominic, her father, and her husband founded the Northern Michigan Ottawa Association (NMOA), with Robert serving as president of the organization and Waunetta serving as secretary. The organization contained eleven bands of northern Odawa who had been signatories to the 1836 Treaty of Washington and the subsequently signed 1855 Treaty of Detroit. The following year, they filed a claim under the Claims Commission.

Because most of the tribes their organization represented were not reservation tribes, Dominic was concerned about their lack of access to health care. She fought for the right for NMOA members to be treated at the Upper Peninsula's Kinchloe Indian Clinic. Recognizing how few Michigan Native Americans had received higher education, she discovered federal programs that could be utilized and worked to assist Native American students in obtaining grants and scholarships. Dominic also was a driving force in the Michigan State tuition waiver program for Native American Students.

"You can call us unrecognized, but don't call us unorganized, and furthermore, I don't care if you recognize me or not," said Dominic, "Recognize my Rights".

—Waunetta Dominic, 1972 speech to the U. S. Congress

In 1959, the government conceded that the bands of Chippewa and Odawa who had signed the treaties had ceded nearly 13,000,000 acres of land and were entitled to a reassessment of whether they were paid a fair value. Because the Keweenaw Bay Indian Community, L’Anse Lac Vieux Desert Band of Chippewa, and the Ontonagon Band of Chippewa had reorganized under the Indian Reorganization Act of 1934, their members were removed as claimants in the suit, which then went to arbitration over the amount of settlement. Dominic traversed the state examining land records in each county in the state to analyze the variance in payment made to Native Americans and the price white settlers sold their lands for historically. She discovered that when the treaties were written in the nineteenth century, Native Americans were paid half of one cent to seventeen cents per acre, when white transactions in the same period were negotiated between ninety-two and ninety-seven cents per acre.

Finally winning a $12.1 million settlement in 1971, which was reduced to $10.3 million because of funds previously paid, the Dominic's battle continued. Having won the judgement, the problem became how it was to be distributed. The Claims Commission recognized the NMOA and allowed it to pursue the case, but the Bureau of Indian Affairs refused to allow the association to reorganize under the Indian Reorganization Act, claiming that as an association rather than a tribal government, each band would need to seek individual recognition. The initial bill proposed to direct the distribution was rejected by Dominic, as it did not include either non-reservation tribes people (at that point the only reservation tribes were the three which had been eliminated from the suit and the Sault Ste. Marie Tribe of Chippewa Indians, which had been reorganized in 1972) nor the blood quantum requirements the tribe members wanted.

Dominic was the spokesperson for the (NMOA) on fishing rights, often acting as an intermediary between Native and white fisherman. In 1975 a lawsuit, United States v. Michigan, was filed concerning those fishing rights and she testified to tribal procedures for issuing licenses and penalties for infractions. The 1979 ruling allowed tribes to continue with gill net fishing, though controversy would continue until 1985 over fishing rights. In 1976, upon her husband's death, Dominic became president of the NMOA and led the organization until her death. Throughout the 1970s, she traveled giving assistance to Odawa with their genealogical records to allow them to participate in the claim distribution and fought to secure that $1.8 million of those funds were set aside for tribes which did not gain federal recognition. She was noted as one of the most influential Native Americans in the state, having led the NMOA to become the largest American Indian organization in the state. In 1979, she was honored by The Detroit News as "Michiganian of the Year".

== Death and legacy ==
Dominic died on 21 December 1981 in Petoskey at Northern Michigan Hospital. She was posthumously inducted into the Michigan Women's Hall of Fame in 1996. Eventually all the bands of the NOMA would gain recognition, though three of the bands, the Burt Lake Band of Ottawa and Chippewa Indians, the Swan Creek Black River Confederated Ojibwa Tribes of Michigan, Mackinac Bands of Chippewa and Ottawa Indians, and ironically, her own band, the Grand River Band of Ottawas are only recognized at the state level. In 1998, the federal government finally agreed to distribute the funds awarded to the Odawa. Having been held in trust since 1971, the final amount of the award was close to $74 million. In 2014, Dominic was again recognized by the Michigan Women's Historical Center and Hall of Fame, during an exhibit hosted to celebrate six women involved in the struggle for Civil Rights.
