= Treaty of Detroit (1855) =

1855 treaty between the United States and Ojibwe and Ottawa

The Treaty of Detroit of 1855 was a treaty between the United States Government and the Ottawa and Chippewa Nations of Indians of Michigan. The treaty contained provisions to allot individual tracts of land to Native people consisting of 40-acre (16 ha) plots for single individuals and 80-acre (32 ha) plots for families, outlined specific tracts which were assigned to the various bands and provided for the severance of the government consolidation of the Ottawa and Chippewa.

== Terms ==
The first eight provisions of the treaty outlined specific township locations which were assigned to the six bands comprising the Sault Ste. Marie Chippewa; the bands living north of the Straits of Mackinac; the bands residing on Beaver Island, Garden Island and High Island; the bands located in Bear Creek, Cross Village, L'Arbre Croche and Middle Village; the Grand Traverse Band; the bands living along Grand River; the bands located at Cheboygan; and the bands residing around Thunder Bay.

Allotments of the townships were to include 40 acres (16 ha) for each single person and 80 acres (32 ha) for each head of a family unit (including families composed of widows and orphans). To determine eligibility, a roll was to be created by the Indian agent. All lands would be issued a patent in the holder's name, though no title would be issued for a period of 10 years. Restrictions on title prohibited selling or transferring any of the allotted holdings during the 10-year period. Should the Indian agent deem the recipient incapable of managing their own affairs after the waiting period, all transfers could remain banned indefinitely. There were further provisions to exempt missions, churches, schools and settlers already residing within the described tracts from being removed, as well as provisions for unallotted land to revert to public domain if not distributed within five years.

Provisions were made for agricultural and educational training, as well as providing payment to establish such facilities. While requiring signatories to release and discharge the United States from liabilities resulting from any previous treaty obligations, the agreement specified that the "right of fishing and encampment secured to the Chippewas of Sault Ste. Marie by the treaty of June 16, 1820," would remain. An additional provision stated that the combined organization of Ottawa and Chippewa was dissolved and that any future negotiations with the United States, except for the 1855 treaty, would be arranged without a general convention of the two peoples.

== Impact ==
The treaty became the basis for numerous lawsuits against the federal government in the 20th century. One of the first was the land claim of the Northern Michigan Ottawa Association (NMOA), filed in 1948 by Waunetta and Robert Dominic. Other suits followed, primarily because settlement of the judgement won could not be distributed, as there were no tribal governments to whom the award could be distributed. Bureaucrats of the government determined that the language of the treaty in effect terminated the tribes, though Vine Deloria Jr. argued that the meaning of the treaty was instead to disassociate the arbitrary grouping the government had formed by placing the Ottawa and Chippewa into a single negotiating entity. Because the treaty provided for continued negotiation by the bands, it was a recognition that the distinct tribal units would negotiate on behalf of their own political units and no longer act as a single entity.

Because low-level bureaucrats determined that the language severed the tribal governments, tribes were forced to attempt to gain re-affirmation as distinct, self-governing nations. Two groups which had previously been consolidated with other bands reorganized in the 1970s: the Sault Ste. Marie Tribe of Chippewa Indians regained recognition in 1972 and the Lac Vieux Desert Band of Lake Superior Chippewa Indians reorganized in 1970 and re-recognized in 1988. Six of the bands were reaffirmed after the land claim was awarded, including the Grand Traverse Band of Ottawa and Chippewa Indians in 1980, the Little Traverse Bay Bands of Odawa Indians and the Little River Band of Ottawa Indians in 1994, the Pokagon Band of Potawatomi Indians in 1994, the Nottawaseppi Huron Band of Potawatomi in 1995, and the Match-e-be-nash-she-wish Band of Pottawatomi Indians of Michigan (also known as the Gunlake band) in 1995. Four of the bands whose members were signatories to the treaty have not been reaffirmed by the federal government. They include the Burt Lake Band of Ottawa and Chippewa Indians (also historically known as the Cheboiganing Band), the Grand River Band of Ottawa Indians, the Mackinac Bands of Chippewa and Ottawa Indians, and the Swan Creek Black River Confederated Ojibwa Tribes of Michigan, each of which is recognized by the state of Michigan.

Finally in 1997, the federal government made a mechanism to distribute the award which had been held in trust since 1972. Disputed fishing claims have continued to be an issue, as have ownership of the lands awarded by the treaty, the right to tax those lands and which governing authority sets legal codes for people living upon the lands. In 2016, a case involving the treaty provisions was filed by the Little Traverse Bay Band over whether the assignment of specific townships to specific bands in the 1855 treaty constituted the establishment of a tribal reserve. In August 2019, after the Emmet County Lakeshore Association, property owners from Harbor Springs to Cross Village, and a coalition of business owners in the region intervened in the suit, Grand Rapids U.S. District Court Judge Paul Maloney rejected the Little Traverse Bay Band's claims, ruling that "...when the Treaty is placed in the relevant historical context, it cannot plausibly be read to have created an Indian reservation, and the Tribe’s predecessors did not believe that it did so."
