= St. Anthony's Rock =

Geological structure and tourist attraction in Michigan

Coordinates: 45.86798°N 84.72660°W

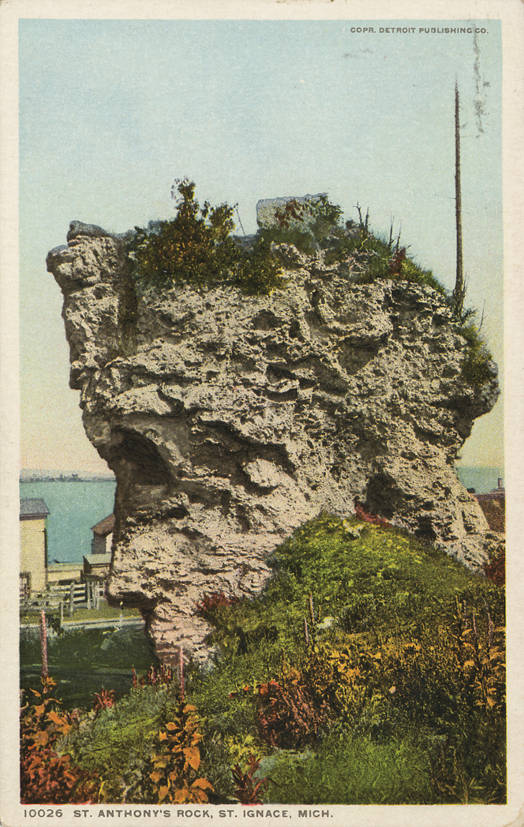
St. Anthony's Rock

St. Anthony's Rock is a geological limestone sea stack and tourist attraction located in the central part of the city of St. Ignace, Michigan in Michigan's Upper Peninsula.

== Description ==
St. Anthony's Rock is a now-landlocked sea stack or sea chimney, geologically similar to several features on Mackinac Island, such as Arch Rock or Sugar Loaf. As with nearby Castle Rock, a large chunk of Mackinac breccia resisted the Wisconsinan Glaciation, as well as the erosional forces of the subsequent post-glacial Lake Algonquin. The post-Ice Age meltoff caused the waters of Lake Algonquin to be much higher than the water level of Lake Huron is today, eroding and washing away the soft rock around the stack.

A local story claims that the rock was named by visitor (1679) Father Louis Hennepin, the chaplain priest of the explorer La Salle. La Salle and Hennepin carried out a program of public devotions to the Roman Catholic saint Anthony of Padua, and Hennepin is known to have named Saint Anthony Falls after the same saint in 1680.

With the coming of rails to St. Ignace in 1881, a railroad train right-of-way snaked directly adjacent to the unusual rock formation. St. Anthony's Rock became a tourist attraction celebrated in postcards and photographs. After a period of neglect the rock was re-celebrated in the 2010s as the site of a small, free-access public park. A small fence protected the rock from vandals, and a sign described its unusual geology and history.

== See also ==
- Castle Rock
- Rabbit's Back
- Straits of Mackinac
