= Kewadin Casinos =

Set of casinos in Michigan, U.S.

- Industry: Gambling
- Founded: 1984; 42 years ago in Sault Ste. Marie, Michigan, United States
- Headquarters: Sault Ste. Marie, Michigan, United States
- Area served: Midwestern United States
- Owner: Sault Tribe of Chippewa Indians
- Website: www.kewadin.com

The Kewadin Casinos (/kəˈweɪˈdən/ kə-WAY-dən) are a set of casinos located in the US state of Michigan. The casinos are owned by the federally recognized Sault Tribe of Chippewa Indians. The primary property is located in Sault Ste. Marie, with additional locations on tribal lands in Christmas, Hessel, Manistique, and St. Ignace.

== History ==
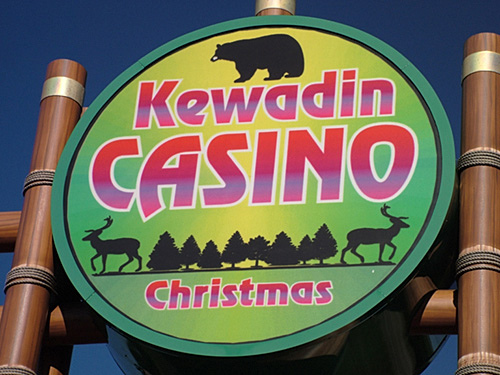
Road entrance sign for Kewadin Casino–Christmas

In the 1980s, Native American activists carved out new areas of sovereignty. With federal law, they could establish gaming casinos on sovereign tribal land, in states that allowed gambling. The states and tribes generally agreed to compacts for some revenue sharing. In some cases, early facilities featured little more than bingo halls. In 1984, the Sault Ste. Marie Tribe of Chippewa Indians Board of Directors voted to open Kewadin Casinos.

=== Initial casinos in the Upper Peninsula of Michigan ===
Kewadin Casinos opened its Sault Ste. Marie property in November 1985, originally as a one-room blackjack house.

In 1987, Kewadin Casinos opened Kewadin Shores Casino–St. Ignace.

In 1994, Kewadin Casinos opened casinos in Christmas, Kewadin Casino–Hessel, and Manistique.

=== Greektown Casino Hotel ===
Until 2008, the Tribe owned a majority interest in Greektown Casino Hotel in Detroit, which opened in 2000. It was one of three casinos authorized by the legislature in 1996 for operation in Detroit as a means for the city to generate revenues. This casino did not operate under the Kewadin name. Due to financial problems related to the 2008 Great Recession, the tribe filed for bankruptcy protection for the Greektown casino. In 2010 it sold its interest and has since focused on developing properties in Upper Michigan.

=== Lansing Kewadin Casino ===
On January 19, 2012, Kewadin Casinos and Mayor of Lansing, Virgil Bernero, announced plans for a $245 million casino to be built in Downtown Lansing's entertainment district. Plans called for the opening of a temporary casino until a 125,000 square feet (11,600 m^{2}) facility was completed on land owned by the City of Lansing. It was to be purchased by the Sault Ste. Marie Tribe of Chippewa Indians. The proposed urban modern-themed casino would be located at Michigan Avenue and Cedar Street, adjacent to the Lansing Center, on land the tribe would purchase from the city and have taken into trust on its behalf by the Department of Interior. The casino would include up to 3,000 slot machines, 48 table games, bars, and restaurants.

The plan was approved by the Lansing City Council on March 19, 2012, and the Tribe in May 2012.

The Lansing casino was opposed by the Michigan Attorney General, who filed a lawsuit in September 2012 to block the project. He argues that the casino violated federal law and a gaming compact between the Sault Chippewa and the state of Michigan. A federal judge issued an injunction on the project in April 2013 in response to the suit.

This was lifted in December 2013 by a federal appeals court, which ruled that the lower court did not have jurisdiction and should not have issued the injunction.

In May 2014, the Supreme Court of the United States ruled against the State of Michigan in a related case regarding an off-reservation casino opened by the Bay Mills Indian Community. It said that tribes had sovereign immunity from state regulation. As a result, the Michigan Attorney General dropped his appeal to the Supreme Court of the United States regarding the injunction on the Lansing casino project.

The original lawsuit remained in a federal court, under charges by the Attorney General that tribal officials had violated the conditions of a Michigan gaming compact with the tribes. In June 2014, the tribe requested that the United States Department of the Interior take the land into trust that they had purchased for the Lansing casino. Approval by the United States Secretary of the Interior of such action is required by the 1997 Michigan Land Claims Settlement Act. As of September 2015, the application is pending.

On September 16, 2015, U.S. District Judge Robert Jonker ruled that the tribe did not violate any laws by submitting this application to the Department of Interior. In December 2017, however, the Department of Interior rejected the application to take this property into trust, halting the casino project. It contended that under the 1934 Indian Reorganization Act, it could not take into trust land that tribes acquired after the act with later federal recognition.

=== Detroit Metropolitan Airport casino ===
In June 2014, the tribe indicated it was considering a casino on a 71-acre (29 ha) property to be acquired near the Detroit Metropolitan Airport.

== Properties ==
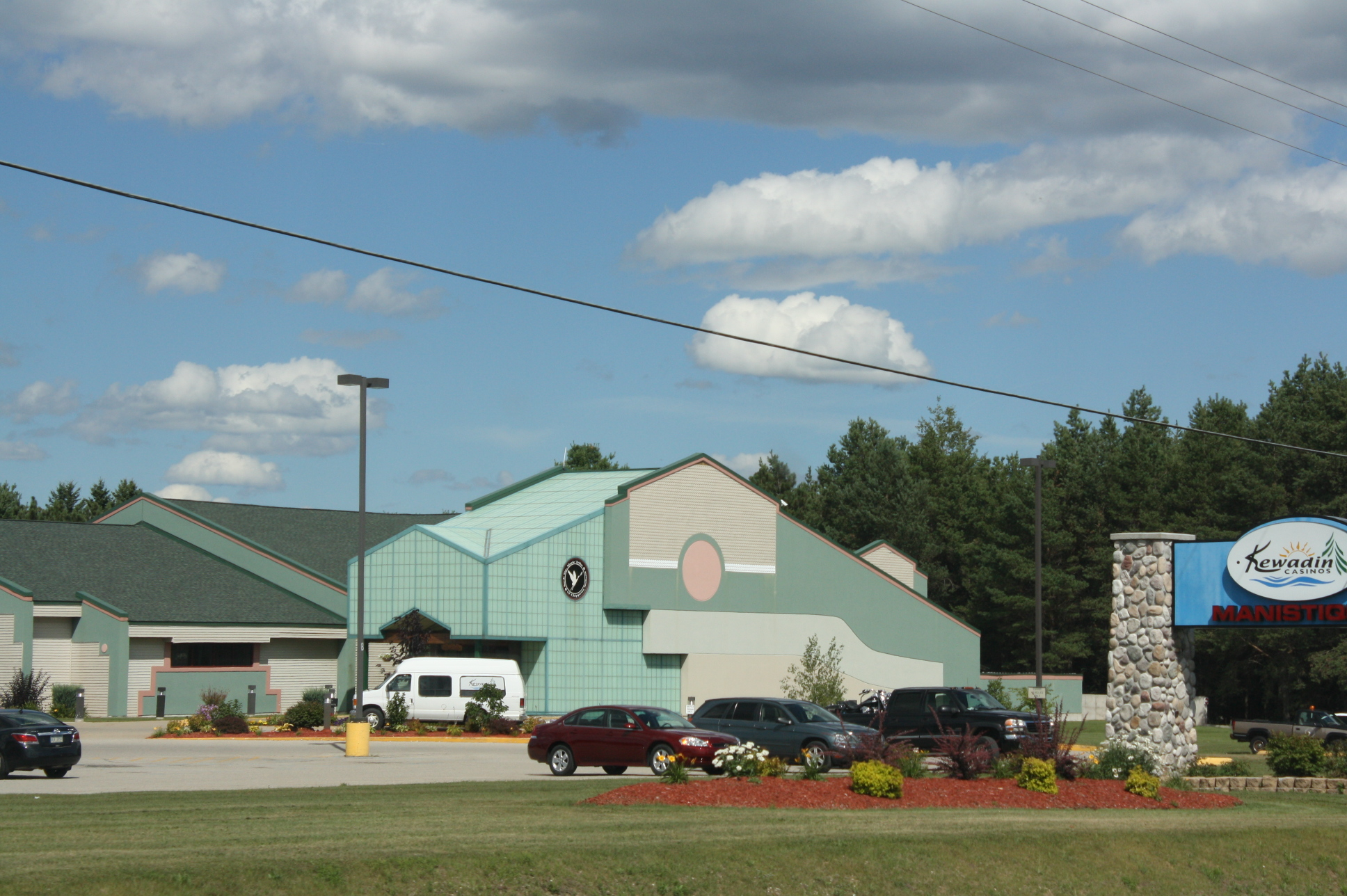
Kewadin Casino–Manistique

=== Current properties ===
As of 2019, Kewadin Casinos includes these properties:

Name	Location	Opened	Notes
Kewadin Casino–Christmas	Christmas	1994	
Kewadin Casino–Hessel	Hessel	1994	
Kewadin Casino–Manistique	Manistique	1994	
Kewadin Casino, Hotel and Convention Center	Sault Ste. Marie	November 1985	
Kewadin Shores Casino–St. Ignace	St. Ignace	1987	

=== Proposed properties ===
Kewadin Casinos has official proposed these properties:

Name	Location	Status	Notes
Lansing Kewadin Casino	Lansing	Land trust application pending with the U.S. Department of the Interior	

=== Past properties ===
Kewadin Casinos was previously involved with these properties:

Name	Location	Opened	Notes
Greektown Casino Hotel	Detroit	November 10, 2000	

== Marketing ==
The casinos use a loyalty program for customers, known as the Northern Rewards Club.

== See also ==
- List of casinos in Michigan
