= Castle Rock (Michigan) =

Geological limestone stack and tourist attraction in Michigan

Coordinates: 45.91059°N 84.74163°W

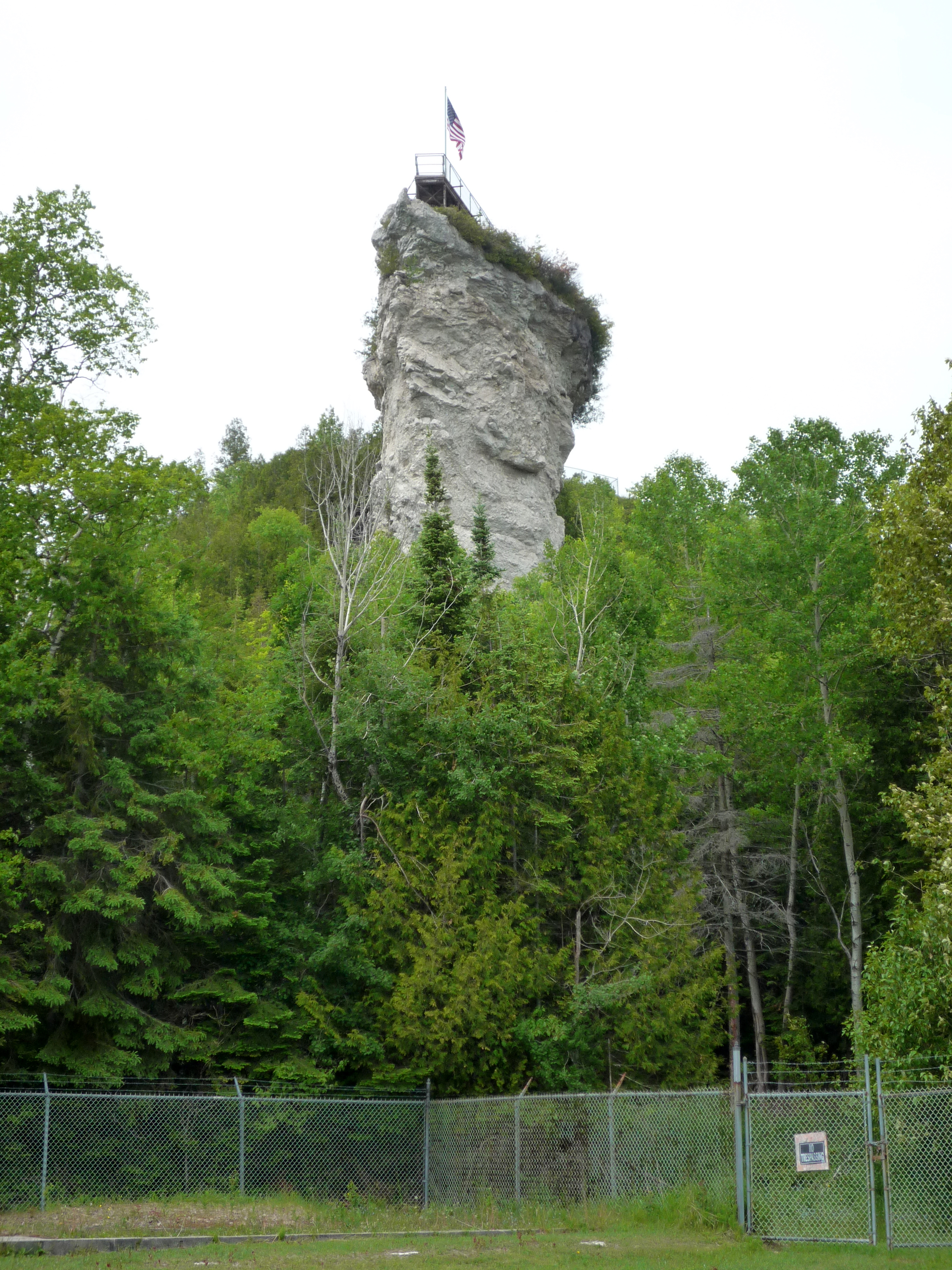
Castle Rock

Castle Rock is a geological limestone stack and tourist attraction located 3 miles (5 km) north of St. Ignace, Michigan on Interstate 75 on the Upper Peninsula of the U.S. state of Michigan.

== Description ==
Castle Rock, which rises 195.8 feet (59 m) over the waters of nearby Lake Huron, was created by erosion of surrounding land. After the Wisconsinan Glaciation, post-glacial Lake Algonquin formed. The Ice Age melt off caused the waters of Lake Algonquin to be much higher than the water level of Lake Huron is today. Over time, the declining water eroded much of the land. Castle Rock, which resisted this erosion, is made of limestone breccia; it is a sea stack or sea chimney, geologically similar to several features on nearby Mackinac Island, such as Arch Rock or Sugar Loaf.

Local residents have told many stories about Castle Rock and its mythical and actual history. It has been advertised as "Ojibway's Lookout", but the nearby hill of Rabbit's Back was more than likely the true lookout. Heroic statues of Paul Bunyan and his sidekick, Babe the Blue Ox, greet visitors to the rock, and there is a gift shop.

C. C. Eby purchased the stack and an adjacent tourist stand in 1928, and opened Castle Rock to the public. It continues to be owned and operated by the Eby family as a seasonal tourist attraction. It is open for business from mid- May through mid-October. Visitors are encouraged to climb an outdoor staircase to the top of the rock. A small admission fee is charged.

== Gallery ==
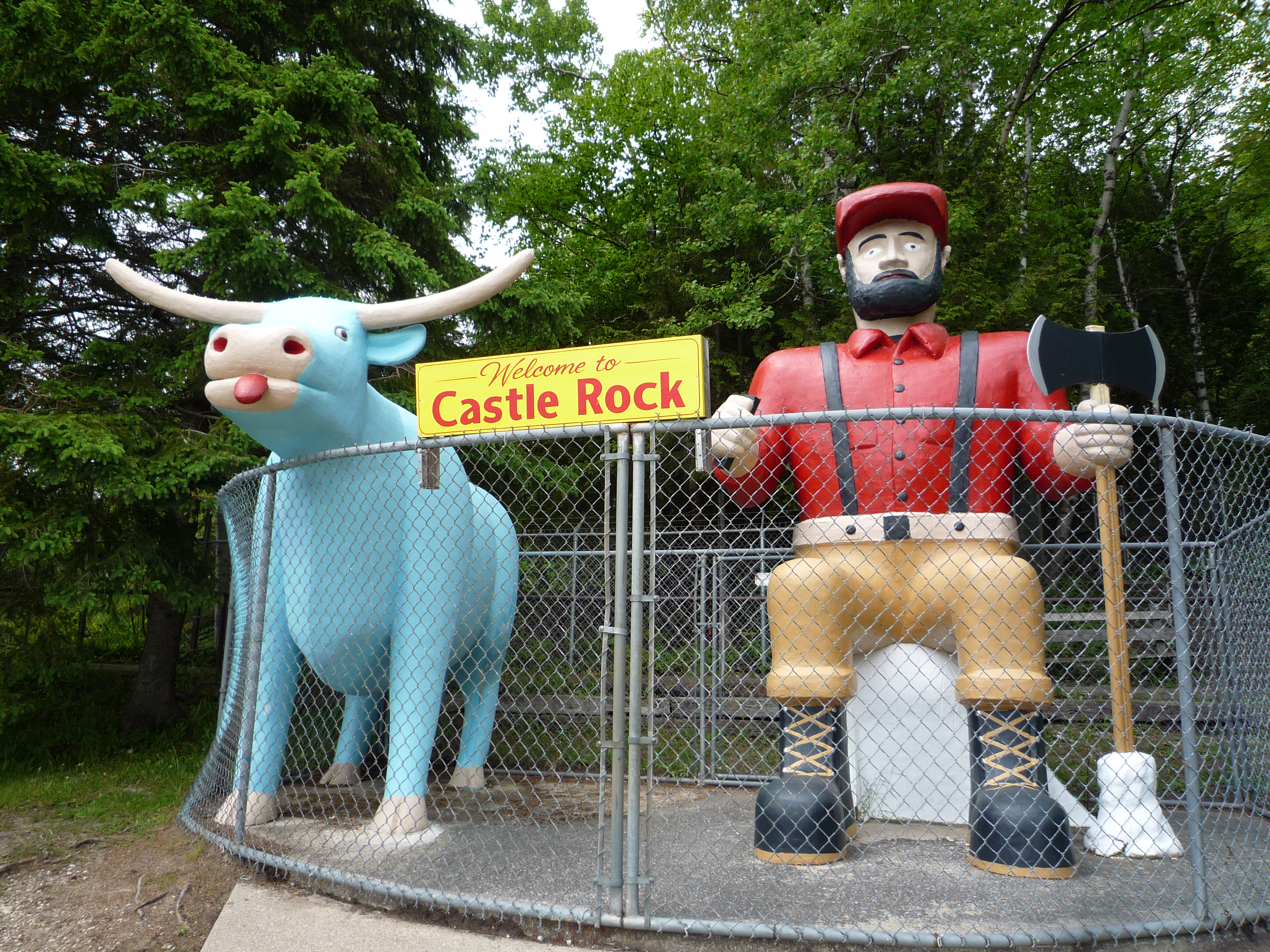
Paul Bunyan and Babe the Blue Ox

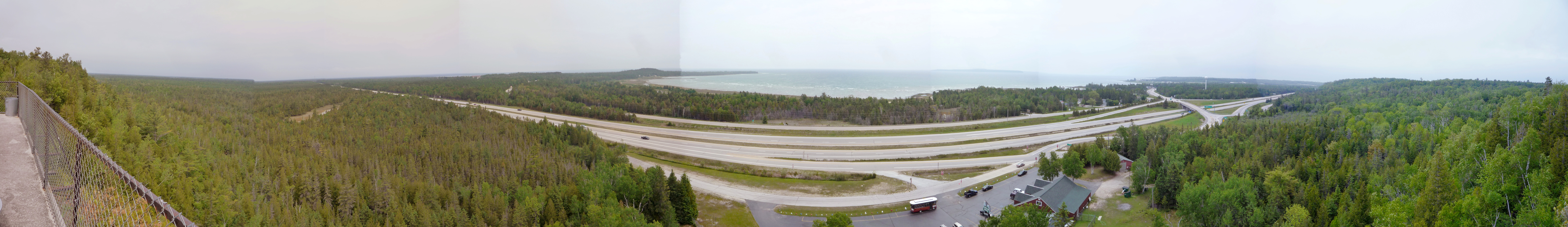
Wide panoramic view from the top of Castle Rock

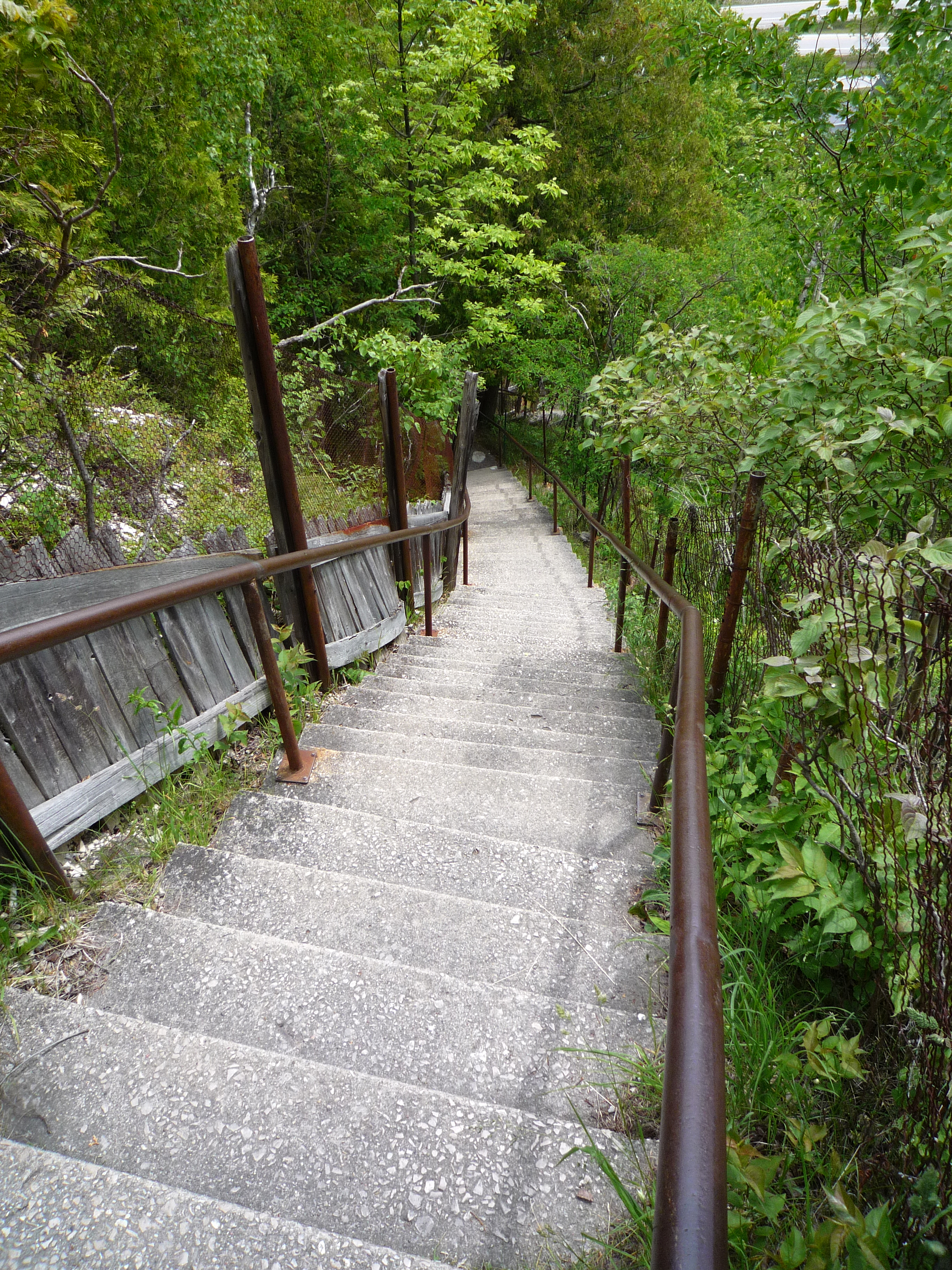
Steep stairs lead to the top

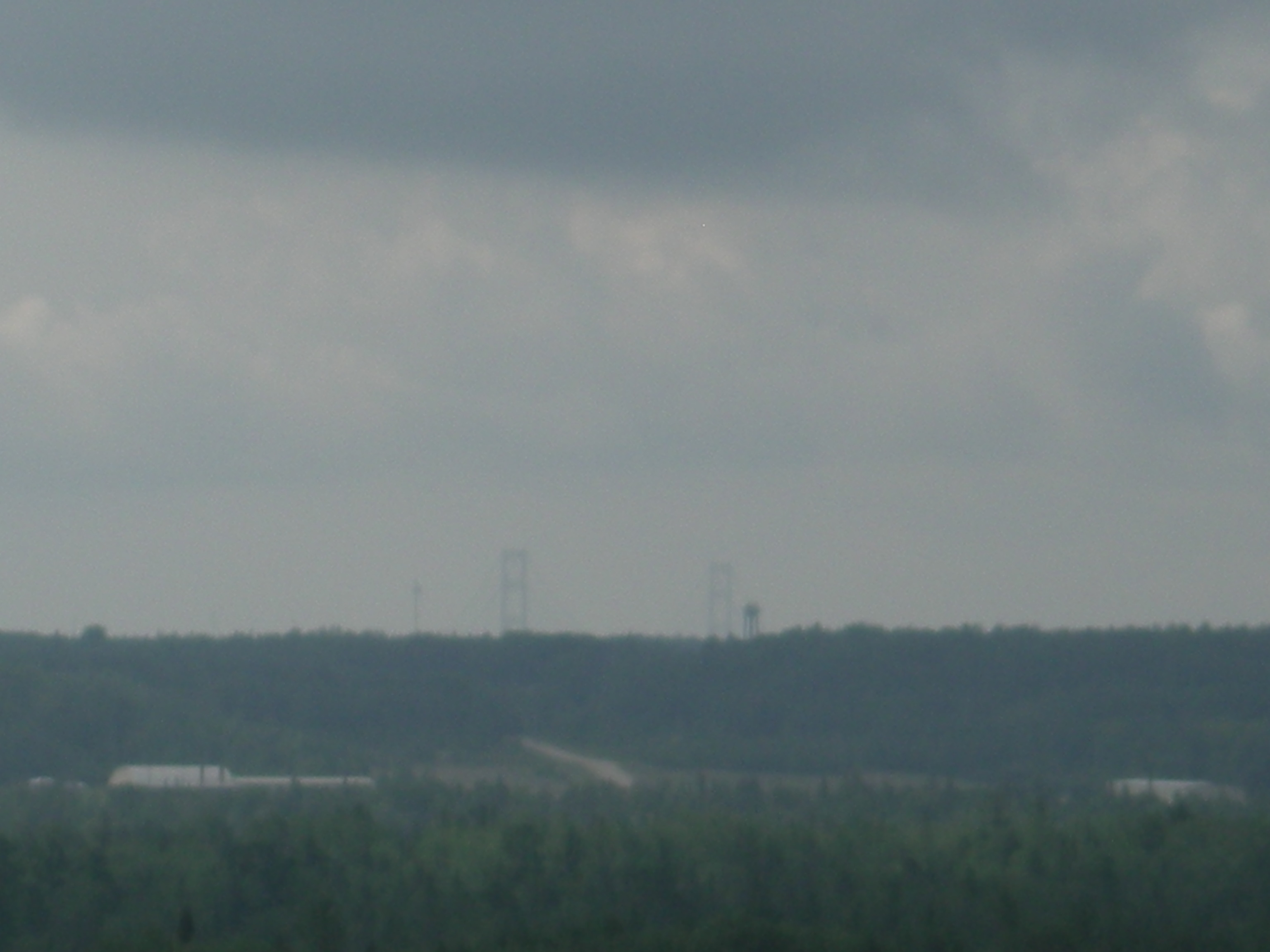
View of the Mackinac Bridge from Castle Rock

== See also ==
- Rabbit's Back
- St. Anthony's Rock
- Straits of Mackinac
