= Kewadin Casino, Hotel and Convention Center =

- Interactive map of Kewadin Casino, Hotel and Convention Center
- Location: 2186 Shunk Road Sault Ste. Marie, Michigan 49783; 46.47575°N 84.32329°W
- Opened: November 1985; 40 years ago
- No. of rooms: 320
- Casino type: Land-based
- Owner: Sault Ste. Marie Tribe of Chippewa Indians
- Website: www.kewadin.com/sault

Kewadin Casino, Hotel and Convention Center is a casino, hotel, and convention center in Sault Ste. Marie, Michigan which opened in November 1985. It is one of the Kewadin Casinos, which are all owned and operated by the Sault Tribe of Chippewa Indians.

== History ==
The Sault Tribe of Chippewa Indians Board of Directors approved the opening of a casino in 1984. The Kewadin Casino, Hotel and Convention Center opened in November 1985, originally as a one-room blackjack house.

The facility was expanded in 1988, 1992, 1993, 1994, 1997, and 2004.

In June 2011, an anonymous tip led to the arrest of two Oklahoma residents by the Sault Ste. Marie Tribal Police after being observed by casino security personnel of using a device to manipulating gaming machines into paying larger payouts. A subsequent investigation by the Sault Ste. Marie Tribal Police and Federal Bureau of Investigation revealed that six individuals had been working together and traveled to the casino on 52 weekends between June 2009 and June 2011 stealing approximately $310,000 from the casino. In October 2013, the six each pleaded guilty to a count of conspiracy to commit theft from a gaming establishment on Indian lands. They were each sentenced by U.S. District Judge Robert Holmes Bell on March 1, 2014.

== Features ==
Kewadin Casino, Hotel and Convention Center includes a casino gaming space, a 320-room hotel, and a 25,000 square feet (2,300 m^{2}) convention center. The facility also includes 3,272 square feet (304.0 m^{2}) of kitchen space and a 12,019 square feet (1,116.6 m^{2}) restaurant which serves over 400,000 people per year. The facility's Dreamcatchers restaurant includes keno gaming.

== See also ==
- List of casinos in Michigan
