= St. Ignace, Michigan =

- City
- City of Saint Ignace
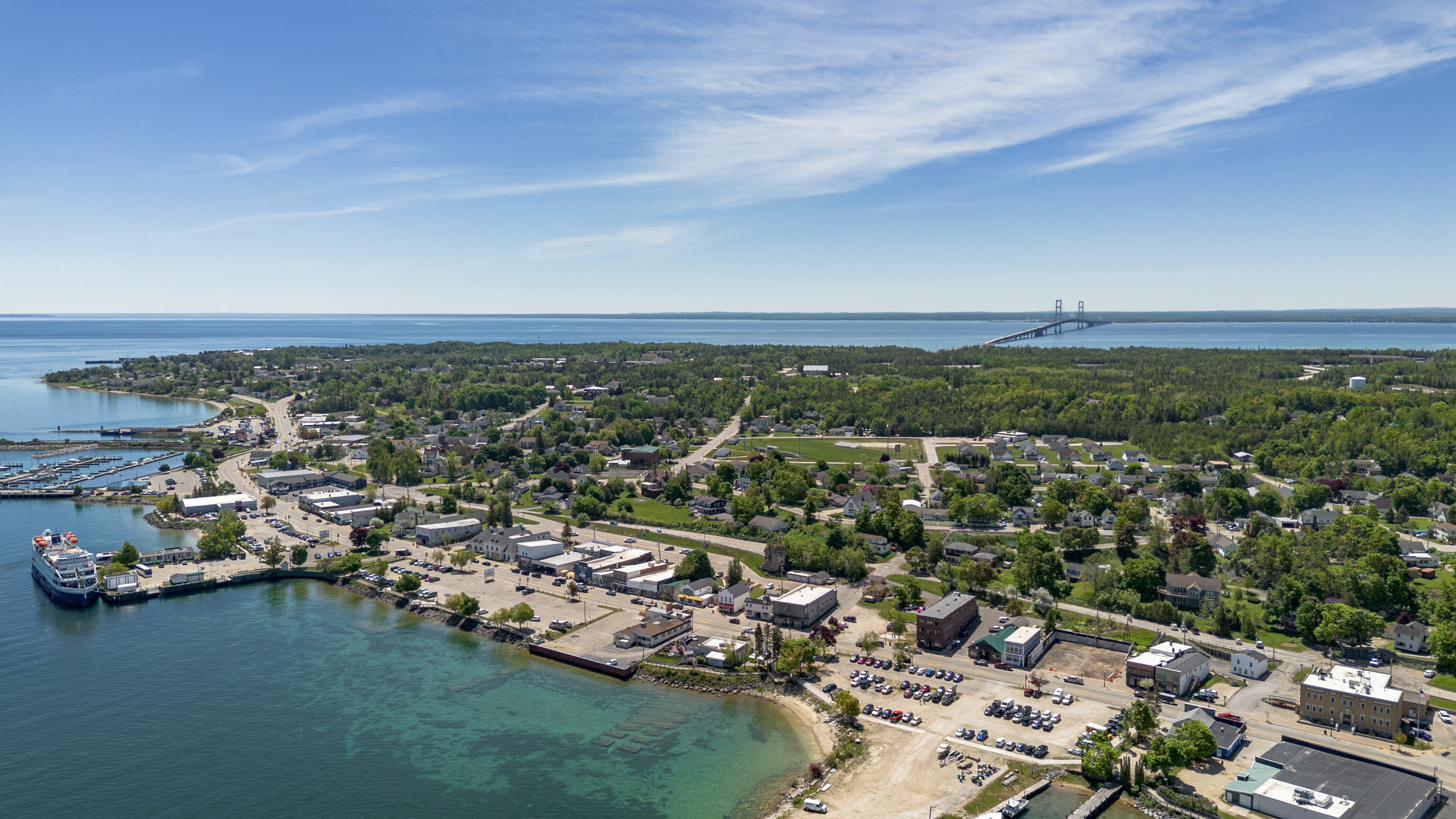
- Aerial image of St. Ignace, 2026
- Motto: Gateway to Michigan's Upper Peninsula
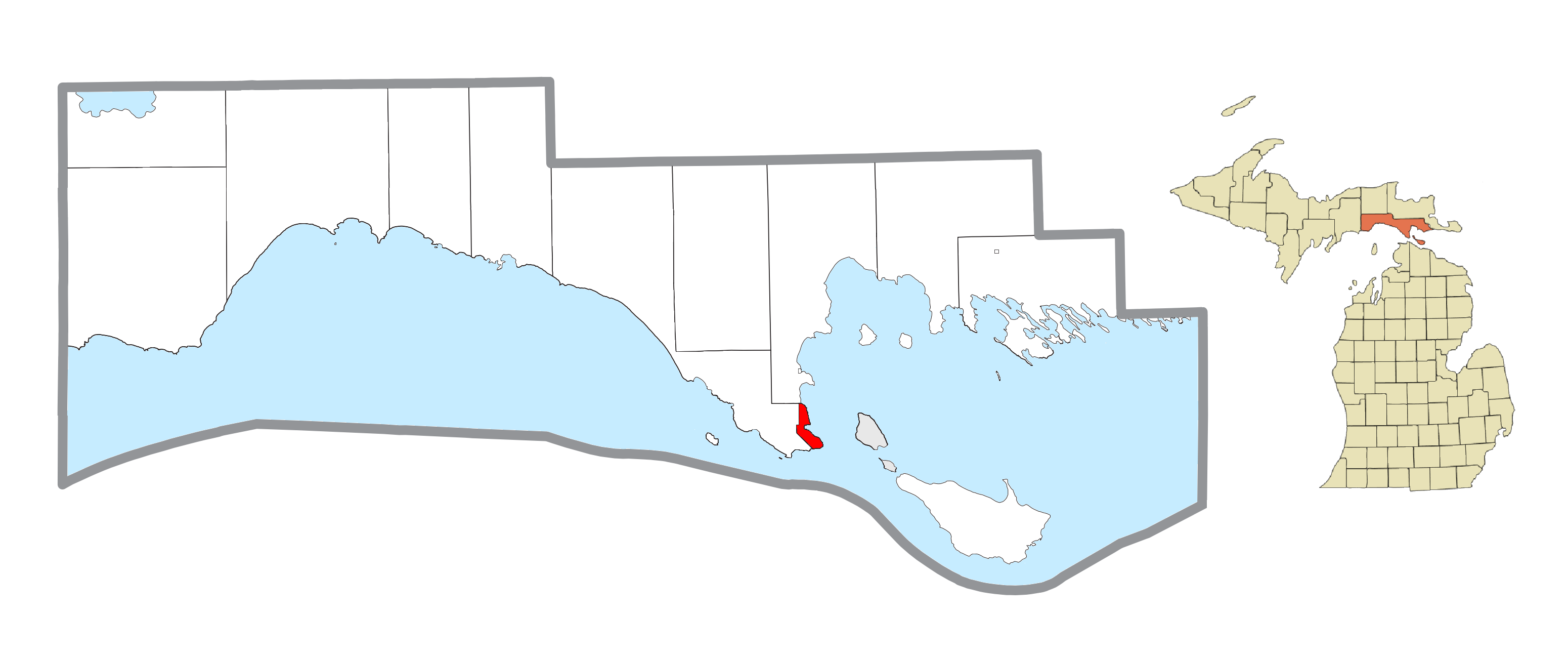
- Location within Mackinac County

- Location within the state of Michigan Location within the United States
- Coordinates: 45°52′27″N 84°43′33″W
- Country: United States
- State: Michigan
- County: Mackinac
- Settled: 1671 (St. Ignace Mission)
- Incorporated: 1882 (village); 1883 (city)

Government
  - Type: Mayor–council

Area
  - Total: 2.65 sq mi (6.86 km^{2})
  - Land: 2.64 sq mi (6.83 km^{2})
  - Water: 0.012 sq mi (0.03 km^{2})
- Elevation: 682 ft (208 m)

Population (2020)
  - Total: 2,306
  - Density: 874.3/sq mi (337.56/km^{2})
- Time zone: UTC-5 (Eastern (EST))
  - Summer (DST): UTC-4 (EDT)
- ZIP code(s): 49781
- Area code: 906
- FIPS code: 26-70840
- GNIS feature ID: 1627027
- Website: Official website

St. Ignace (/ˈɪɡnəs/ IG-nəss) is a city in the U.S. state of Michigan and the county seat of Mackinac County. The city had a population of 2,306 at the 2020 census. St. Ignace Township is located just to the north of the city; the two are administered separately.

St. Ignace is located along Lake Huron in the Upper Peninsula on the northern side of the Straits of Mackinac. The city serves as a gateway to the state's Upper Peninsula for travelers coming from the Lower Peninsula, as the city is at the north end of the Mackinac Bridge, opposite Mackinaw City. It has one of two ports which provide ferry service to nearby Mackinac Island.

St. Ignace's history dates back to 1671 when French Jesuit priests founded the St. Ignace Mission, which makes it one of the oldest European settlements in the state after Sault Ste. Marie. The area was previously inhabited by the Wyandot people, as well as the Ojibwe and Ottawa tribes of Native Americans. St. Ignace soon became the center of fur trading with the French. It was incorporated as a village in 1882 and a city in 1883. The Mackinac Bands of Chippewa and Ottawa Indians is headquartered at St. Ignace, and the city continues to have a high population of Native Americans.

== History ==
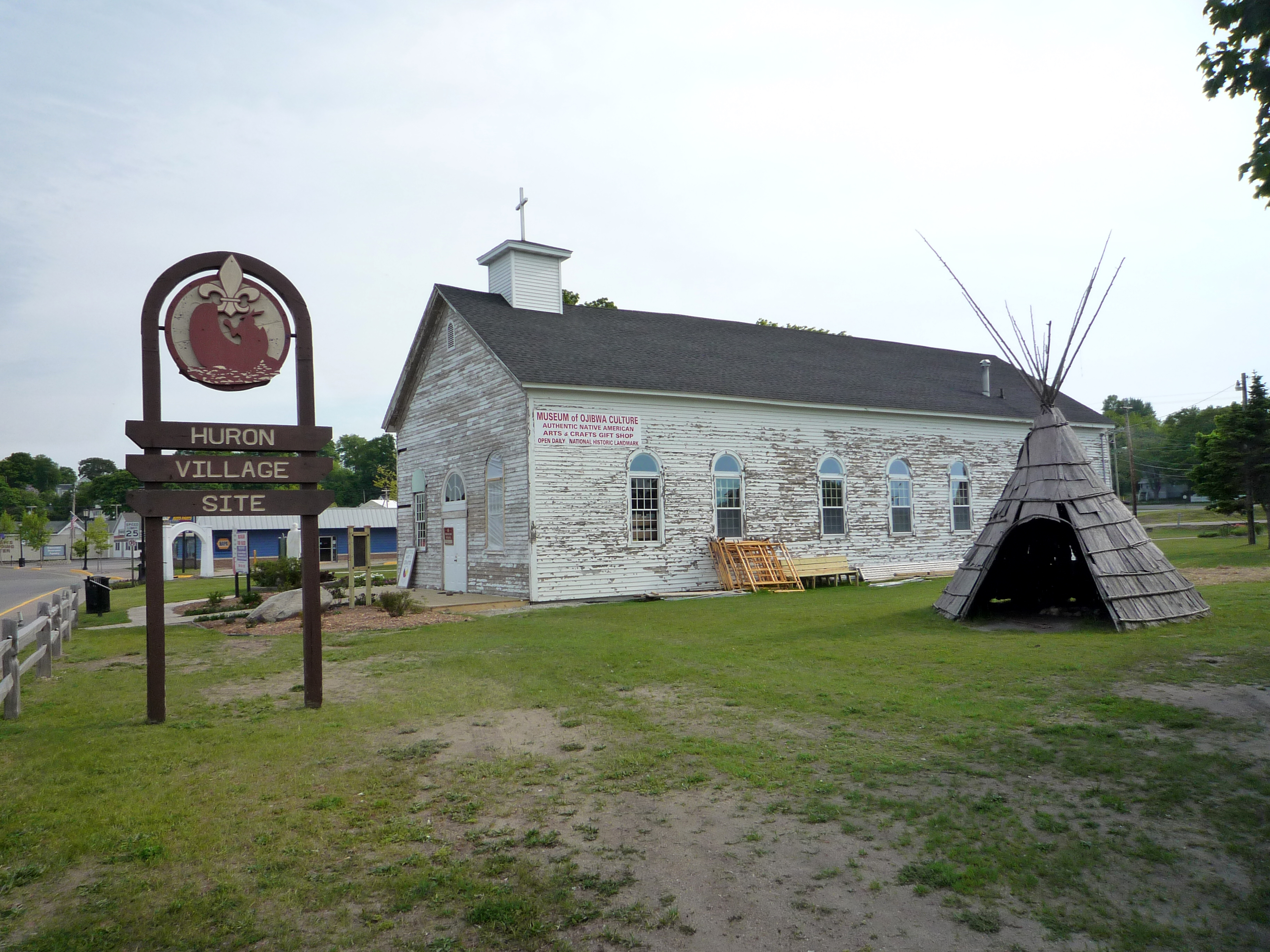
The Museum of Ojibwa Culture operates in the former St. Ignace Mission building. The mission is listed on the National Register of Historic Places. It was established at a historic Wyandot (Huron) village.

St. Ignace is the second-oldest city founded by Europeans in Michigan. Various cultures of Native Americans had inhabited the area for thousands of years before the first exploration here by French colonists. Early historic peoples of the area in the 17th century were predominantly the Iroquoian-speaking Wendat, whom the French called the Huron.

By the early 18th century, the Anishinaabe Ojibwe, who spoke one of the Algonquian languages, became prominent in the region. Another related Anishinaabe people were the Ottawa or Odawa in their language. The third member of the Council of Three Fires, a loose confederacy of these tribes, was the Potawatomi people. All three peoples have descendants who are members of various federally recognized tribes in northern Michigan.

French explorer and priest Jacques Marquette founded the St. Ignace Mission on this site in 1671 and was buried here after his death. He named it for St. Ignatius of Loyola, founder of the Jesuit religious order, whose priests were active as missionaries across North America. (Ignace is the French version of Ignatius.) Jesuits served at missions to convert First Nations/Native Americans to Catholicism and to share French culture. In 1673, Marquette joined the expedition of Louis Jolliet, a French-Canadian explorer, and departed from St. Ignace on May 17, with two canoes and five voyageurs of French-Indian ancestry (Métis) on a voyage to find the Mississippi River. They were successful and descended downriver as far as Arkansas.

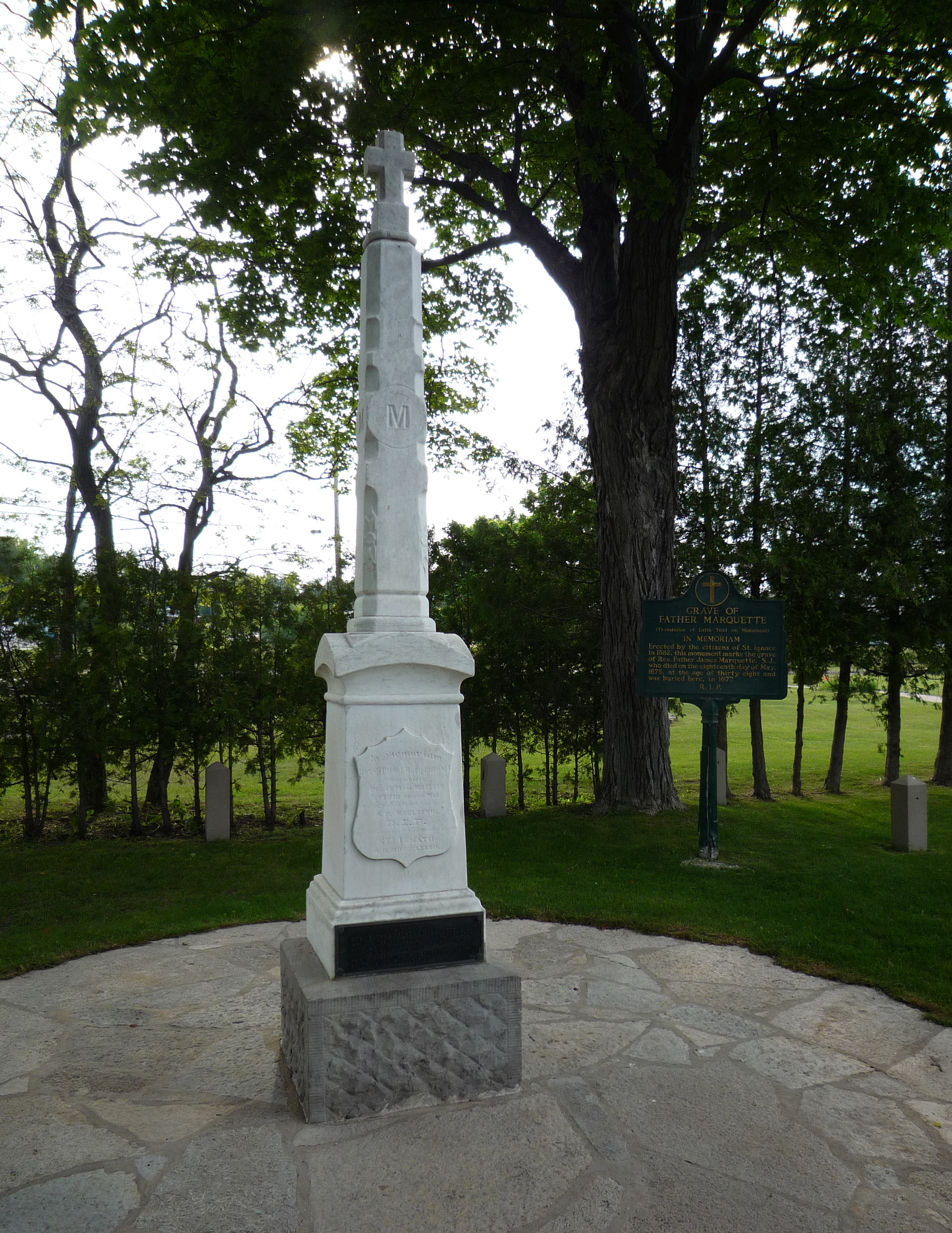
A monument marks the grave of Father Marquette, where he was buried next to the St. Ignace Mission, now used as the Museum of Ojibway Culture.

While separately exploring the Great Lakes region on the ship Le Griffon with Louis Hennepin, Sieur de La Salle reached St. Ignace on August 27, 1679. Louis de La Porte, Sieur de Louvigny founded Fort de Buade here in 1681 as a fur trading post. It was later directed by Antoine Cadillac. It was closed by the French in 1697. The Jesuits abandoned their mission in 1705.

The Ojibwe, who came to dominate most of the Native American territory of present-day Michigan in the 18th century, were allies of the French in the Seven Years' War against the British. After the British victory in the Seven Years' War, in 1763 they took over the territory of France in North America, including this part of the former New France. After the victory of rebellious colonists in the American Revolutionary War, in 1783 the village was included within the new United States, as part of what became called its Northwest Territory.

An important fur trading site for both the French and the British, St. Ignace declined in importance by the early 19th century. The Ojibwe had allied with Great Britain in the War of 1812, based on their long trading and a hope they would expel American colonists. The fur trade declined at St. Ignace largely because the United States prohibited British Canadian traders from operating across the border after the end of the war. At the same time European demand for North American furs was declining as tastes changed, and other parts of the economy grew.

Both British-Canadians and later Americans operated a larger trading center at Sault Ste. Marie, which developed on both sides of the Canadian-US border, until the decline of the fur trade in the 1830s. The fur trade also suffered before and during the hostilities of the War of 1812, as the United States first imposed a boycott on all trade with England, including traders in Canada. Many local people kept businesses going by smuggling, but postwar prohibitions on the fur trade were more difficult to avoid. prohibited British traders from operating across the border, as had been their earlier practice. The Ojibwe had allied with the British, their longtime trading partners, during the War of 1812,

In 1882, construction of the Detroit, Mackinac and Marquette Railroad, which connected the straits area to the major city of Detroit, provided an economic boost to the village. Farmers and the lumber industry could more easily get products to a major market. St. Ignace was incorporated as a village on February 23, 1882, and as a city in 1883.

In the late 19th century, a new sector of its economy developed, as it began to attract tourists as a popular summer resort and for its connection to Mackinac Island.

Since the late 20th century, the city has become a rural destination for heritage tourism and is part of a regional area popular for summer tourism. A variety of water sports and activities are available.

The Mackinac Bands of Chippewa and Ottawa Indians, a state-recognized tribe, is based in St. Ignace. It also has bands in several other counties in the region. With an enrolled membership of 4,000 in this area and state recognition, it has been seeking federal recognition since 1998. The larger federally recognized Sault Ste. Marie Tribe of Chippewa Indians, based in the city of that name and the region of northern Michigan, owns and operates a gaming casino in St. Ignace on land it controls in the city, in addition to land and casinos in four other cities in the state.

== Geography ==
According to the United States Census Bureau, the city has a total area of 2.65 square miles (6.86 km^{2}), of which 0.01 square miles (0.03 km^{2}) are water. Point St. Ignace, which separates the Straits of Mackinac from Lake Huron, occupies the southern half of the city. The city is laid out along the west shore of Lake Huron, with the southern edge of the city facing the Straits. Straits State Park is in the southern part of the city.

== Demographics ==
Historical population
Census	Pop.	Note	%±
1880	934		—
1890	2,704		189.5%
1900	2,271		−16.0%
1910	2,118		−6.7%
1920	1,852		−12.6%
1930	2,109		13.9%
1940	2,669		26.6%
1950	2,946		10.4%
1960	3,334		13.2%
1970	2,892		−13.3%
1980	2,632		−9.0%
1990	2,568		−2.4%
2000	2,678		4.3%
2010	2,452		−8.4%
2020	2,306		−6.0%
U.S. Decennial Census

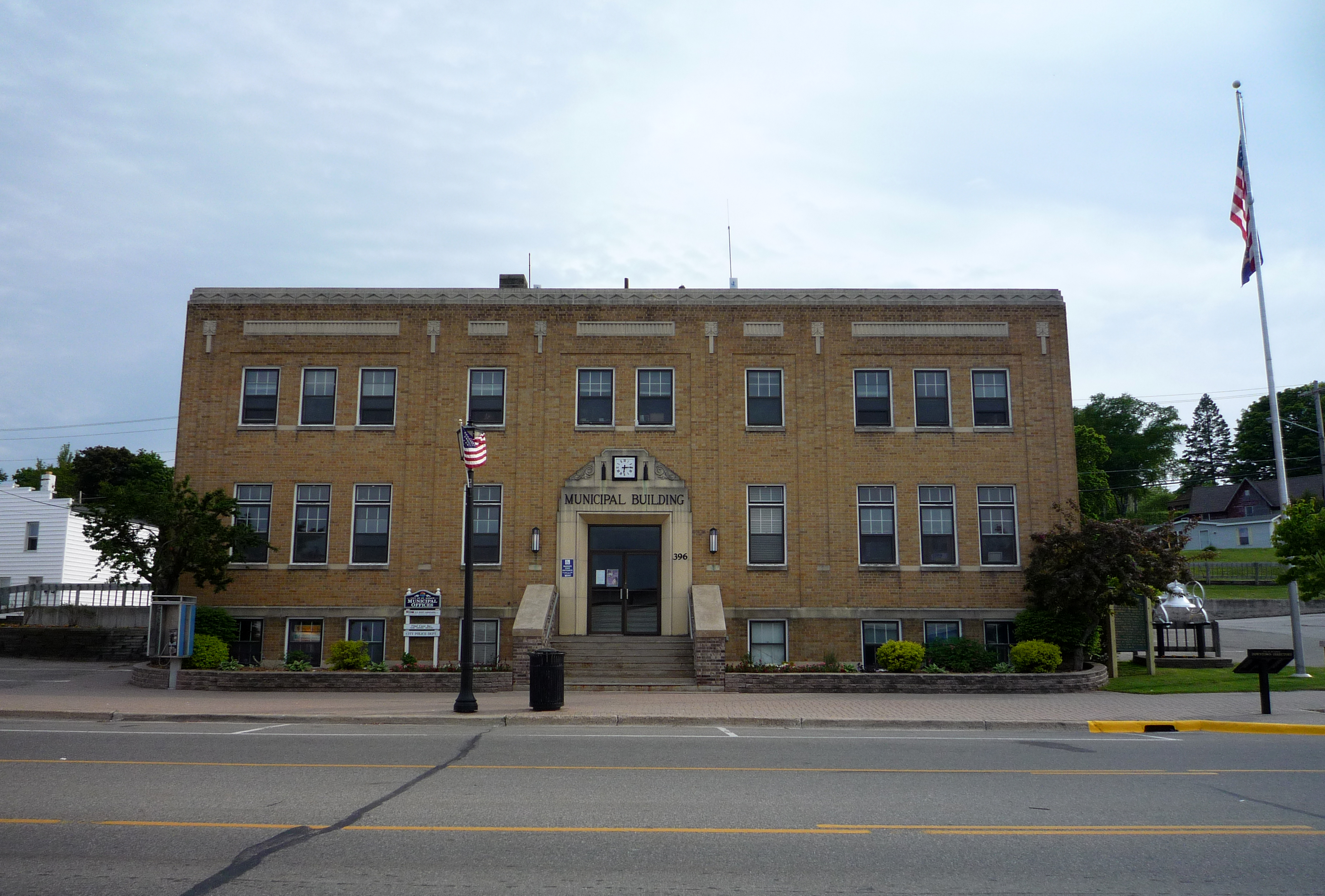
Municipal Building

=== 2020 census ===
As of the 2020 census, St. Ignace had a population of 2,306. The median age was 49.4 years. 17.0% of residents were under the age of 18 and 27.1% of residents were 65 years of age or older. For every 100 females there were 95.8 males, and for every 100 females age 18 and over there were 93.0 males age 18 and over.

100.0% of residents lived in urban areas, while 0.0% lived in rural areas.

There were 1,047 households in St. Ignace, of which 21.1% had children under the age of 18 living in them. Of all households, 39.4% were married-couple households, 23.6% were households with a male householder and no spouse or partner present, and 30.0% were households with a female householder and no spouse or partner present. About 38.3% of all households were made up of individuals and 16.7% had someone living alone who was 65 years of age or older.

There were 1,324 housing units, of which 20.9% were vacant. The homeowner vacancy rate was 1.9% and the rental vacancy rate was 11.3%.

Racial composition as of the 2020 census
Race	Number	Percent
White	1,513	65.6%
Black or African American	14	0.6%
American Indian and Alaska Native	536	23.2%
Asian	8	0.3%
Native Hawaiian and Other Pacific Islander	1	0.0%
Some other race	5	0.2%
Two or more races	229	9.9%
Hispanic or Latino (of any race)	30	1.3%

=== 2010 census ===
As of the census of 2010, there were 2,452 people, 1,064 households, and 633 families residing in the city. The population density was 914.9 inhabitants per square mile (353.2/km^{2}). There were 1,299 housing units at an average density of 484.7 per square mile (187.1/km^{2}). The racial makeup of the city was 63.4% White, 1.0% African American, 27.8% Native American, 0.3% Asian, 0.2% from other races, and 7.3% from two or more races. Hispanic or Latino residents of any race were 1.1% of the population.

There were 1,064 households, of which 27.0% had children under the age of 18 living with them, 43.3% were married couples living together, 11.1% had a female householder with no husband present, 5.1% had a male householder with no wife present, and 40.5% were non-families. 33.8% of all households were made up of individuals, and 13.6% had someone living alone who was 65 years of age or older. The average household size was 2.24 and the average family size was 2.84.

The median age in the city was 44.5 years. 21.3% of residents were under the age of 18; 7.7% were between the ages of 18 and 24; 21.6% were from 25 to 44; 31.6% were from 45 to 64; and 17.7% were 65 years of age or older. The gender makeup of the city was 48.2% male and 51.8% female.

=== 2000 census ===
Largest ancestries (2000)	Percent
Ojibwe	23%
German	18%
Irish	11%
French	10%
English	8%
Polish	7%

As of the census of 2000, there were 2,678 people, 1,085 households, and 675 families residing in the city. The population density was 990.7 inhabitants per square mile (382.5/km^{2}). There were 1,232 housing units at an average density of 455.8 per square mile (176.0/km^{2}). The racial makeup of the city was 71.81% White, 19.42% Native American, 0.56% Asian, 0.30% African American, 0.04% Pacific Islander, 0.19% from other races, and 7.69% from two or more races. Hispanic or Latino residents of any race were 0.90% of the population.

There were 1,085 households, out of which 29.2% had children under the age of 18 living with them, 46.7% were married couples living together, 11.5% had a female householder with no husband present, and 37.7% were non-families. 31.6% of all households were made up of individuals, and 15.0% had someone living alone who was 65 years of age or older. The average household size was 2.35 and the average family size was 2.96.

In the city, 23.2% of the population was under the age of 18, 8.6% was from 18 to 24, 27.4% from 25 to 44, 22.7% from 45 to 64, and 18.1% was 65 years of age or older. The median age was 39 years. For every 100 females, there were 93.4 males. For every 100 females age 18 and over, there were 88.2 males.

The median income for a household in the city was $34,447, and the median income for a family was $45,893. Males had a median income of $29,813 versus $23,017 for females. The per capita income for the city was $17,340. About 6.0% of families and 9.0% of the population were below the poverty line, including 10.3% of those under age 18 and 9.5% of those age 65 or over.

== Education ==
St. Ignace Area Schools is the local school district.

== Local sights ==
Kewadin Casino of St. Ignace, is a significant tourist attraction and local employer. Straits State Park is located at the south end of the city. Wawatam Lighthouse is located in the city's harbor. The harbor also is a port for Coast Guard ice breakers, e.g., the tug Katmai Bay (Note: Stationed at Sault Ste. Marie, Michigan.) and heavy duty breaker Mackinaw. (Note: The Mackinaw is stationed at Cheboygan, Michigan.)

St. Anthony's Rock, a free-access geological limestone stack, is located in the center of the town. Castle Rock, a similar but taller stack for which admission is charged, is located three miles (4.8 km) north overlooking Lake Huron. Rabbit's Back, a prominent promontory that also overlooks Lake Huron, is four miles (6.4 km) north. Chain Lake, one mile (1.6 km) inland, features inland fishing opportunities.

== Transportation ==
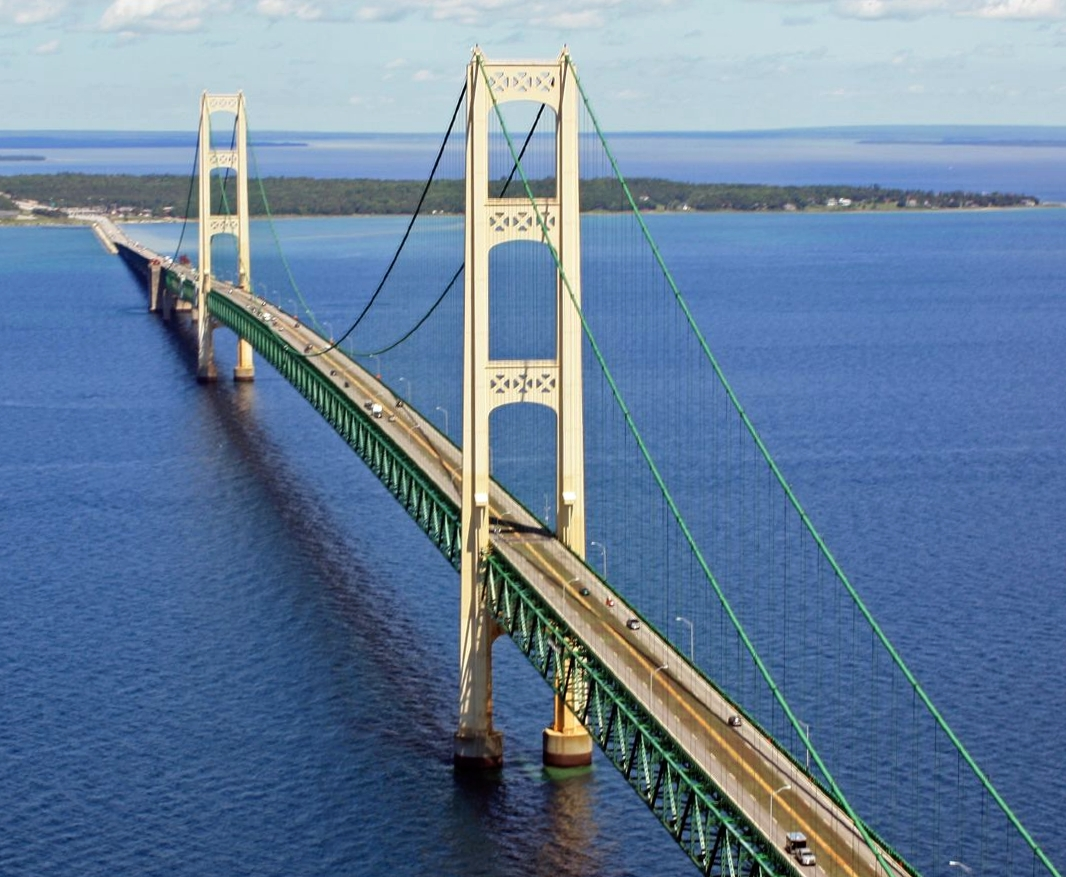
Mackinac Bridge, Mackinaw City to St. Ignace

=== Major highways ===
- I-75 crosses over the Mackinac Bridge and through St. Ignace. Southbound I-75 takes drivers to the Lower Peninsula; northbound the freeway heads toward Sault Ste. Marie and Canada.
- BL I-75 follows the route of old US 2.
- US 2 ends in St. Ignace at I-75. Westbound, US 2 traverses a scenic stretch along Lake Michigan, toward Manistique and Escanaba.
- H-63 (Mackinac Trail) is a north–south route traveling along the former route of US 2 from just north of St. Ignace to Sault Ste. Marie.

=== Ferry services ===
Two ferry companies (Shepler's Ferry and the Arnold Transit Company) operate out of Saint Ignace, connecting tourists and commuters to Mackinac Island.

=== Airports ===
The nearest airports with scheduled passenger service are in Chippewa County International Airport in Kinross (northeast of St. Ignace, adjacent to I-75) and Pellston Regional Airport in the Lower Peninsula.

=== Bus service ===
Indian Trails provides daily intercity bus service between St. Ignace and East Lansing, Michigan, between St. Ignace and Bay City, Michigan, and between St. Ignace and Ironwood, Michigan.

== Notable people ==
- Prentiss M. Brown, U.S. senator from Michigan
- Tony Earl, former governor of Wisconsin
- Aubrey Fitch, vice admiral, United States Navy
- Nicholas Orontony, 18th-century Wyandot leader
- Joe Ostman, professional football player
- Les Sweetland, professional baseball pitcher

== Gallery ==
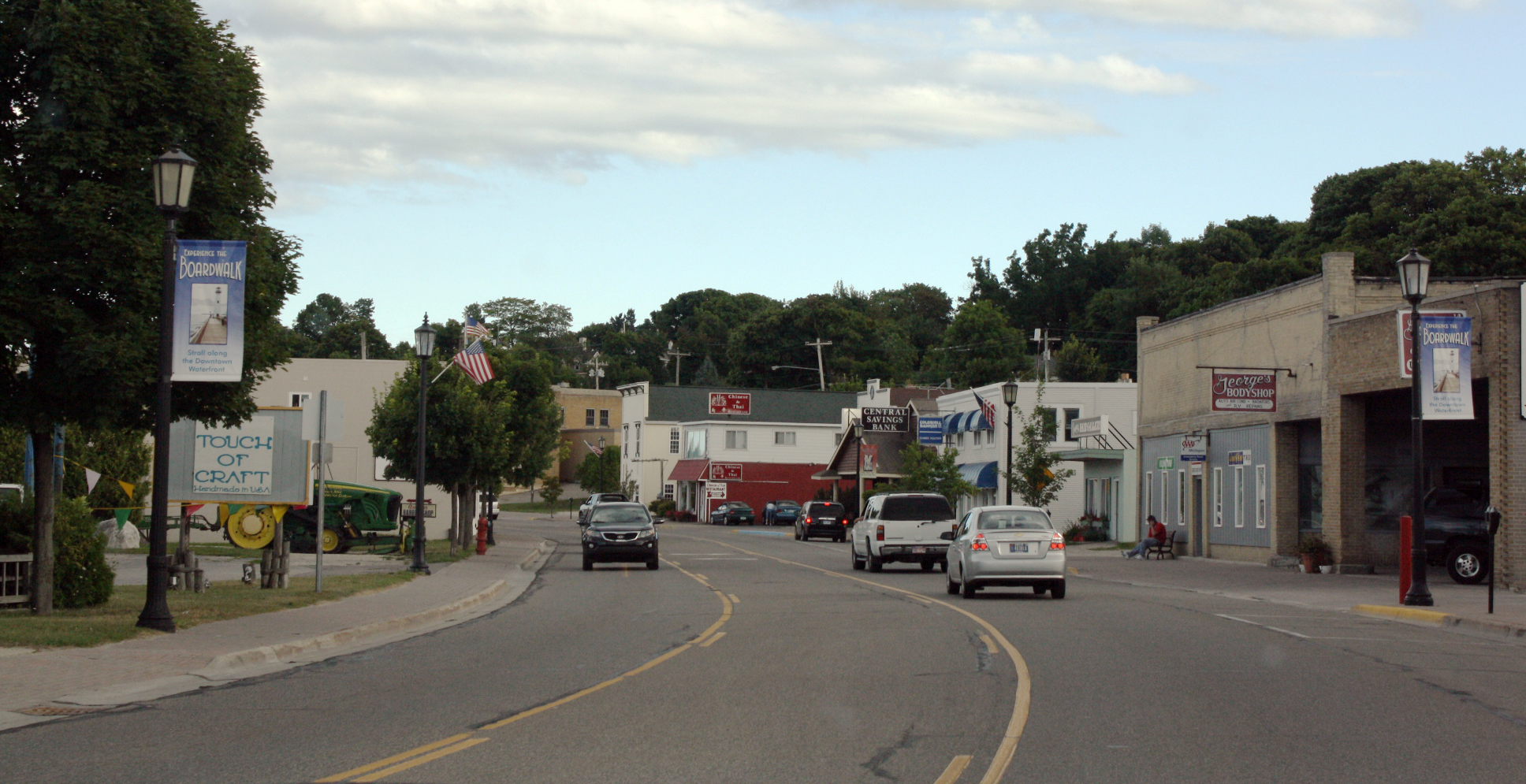
Downtown St. Ignace along BL I-75 in 2011

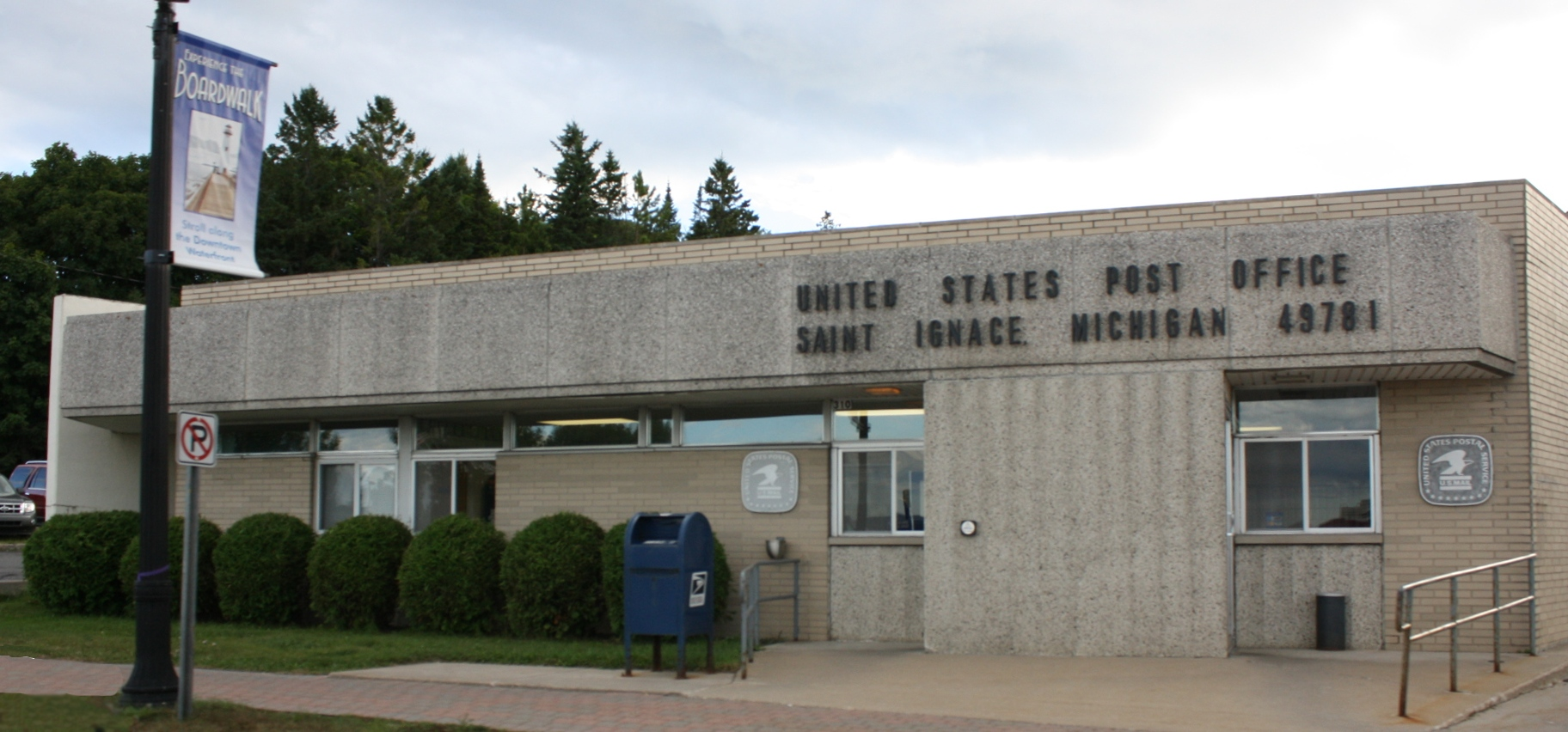
Post office

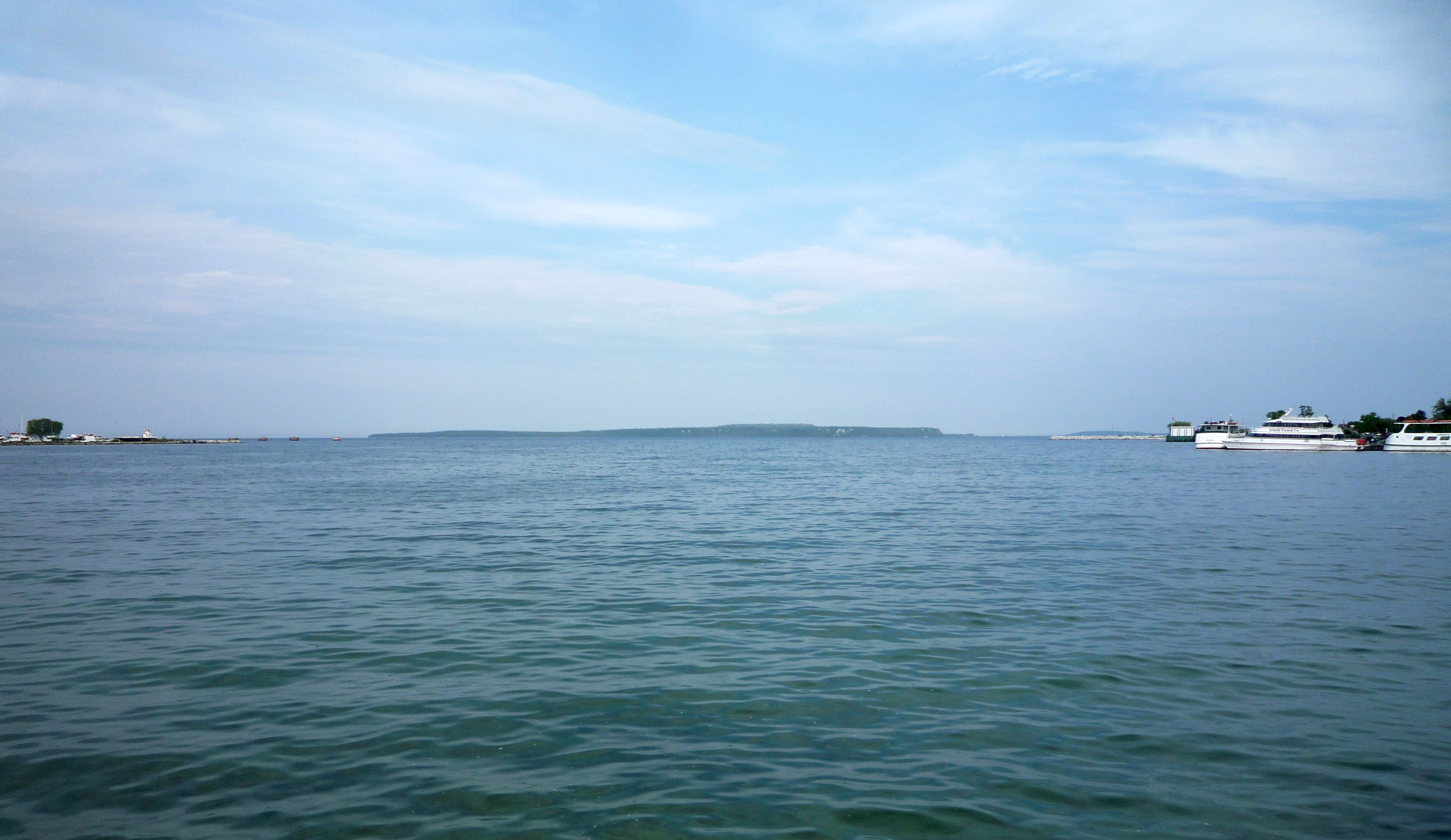
The ferry harbor with Mackinac Island in the distance
