= Burt Lake burn-out =

1900 eviction of Indians in Michigan

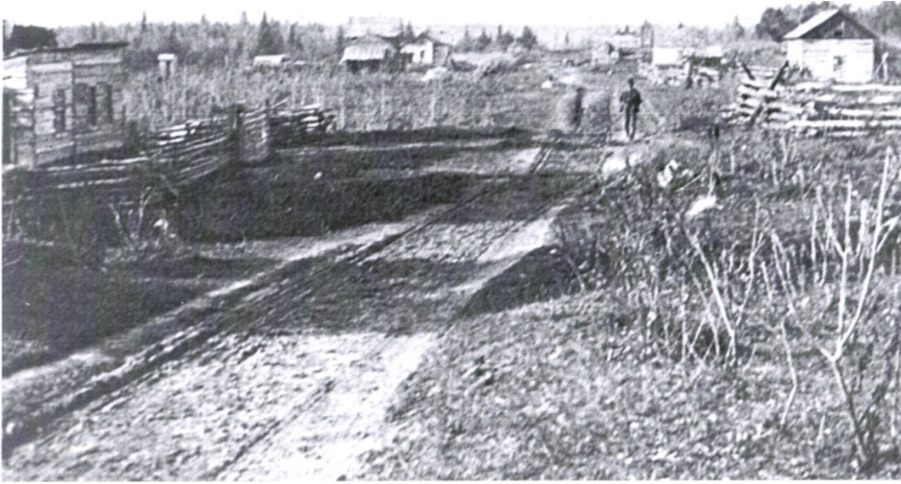
Burt Lake Indian Village, 1890

The Burt Lake Burn-Out was a forced relocation of the Burt Lake Band of Chippewa and Ottawa Indians in northern Michigan's "Tip of the Mitt" region on 15 October 1900. On that day sheriff Fred Ming and his deputies burned down the band's village at the behest of a local land developer who claimed to have purchased the village land parcels for back taxes.

The event has been since labeled: "A Bitter Memory," "A Shameful Past," or "Legalized Arson." Professional research by Richard White, Stanford University, George Cornell, Michigan State University, and Alice Littlefield, Central Michigan University, has shown that it was all of these things and was allowed to happen as a result of the state and federal government officials' inclination to either misinterpret, forget, or deny the written treaty language of the 1830s and 1850s, in the agreements between Washington, D.C., and the Michigan-based Burt Lake Band of Ottawa Indians.

== Background ==
The Tip of the Mitt area of northern Michigan has been categorized by Charles Cleland at Michigan State University as a "prehistoric crossroads", an avenue of travel by water beginning at the Straits of Mackinac, southwest along the shoreline of Lake Michigan, and south to Grand Traverse Bay. This waterway was used by Native Americans as far back as 10,000 years and was the centerpiece of the Woodland Indian "canoe culture" beginning in the mid-1600s. The Ottawa (Odawa) bands of Indians used as their base, what Cleland refers to as, the "Grand Traverse Corridor." It was the area of origin for the many trade goods they canoed to other Great Lakes-based Indians of the Upper Mid-West Region.

The Ottawa were farmers, fishermen and hunters, as well as gatherers, who used the warm months of the year to inhabit various Lake Michigan and inland lake shorelines of the Tip of the Mitt area in lower northern Michigan. It was here that they procured the goods that would later be traded. Unlike the political organization found to exist within Native American societies in other areas of North America, the Ottawa (Odawa) and fellow Chippewa (Ojibwa) people of northern Michigan existed as separate small bands of Indians, some migrating with the change in weather, others living in small (100–200 people) fixed villages. The small Ottawa-Chippewa village along the western shoreline of the inland lake once referred to as Lake Cheboigan, and later, Burt Lake, had its beginnings sometime in the mid to later 1600s. By 1850, the Cheboigan Band of Ottawa and Chippewa at this site on Burt Lake had their home referred to as Indian Village.

The federal government treaties signed by representative of the Burt Lake Band of Ottawa in Washington -1836, and Detroit-1855 (1856), both declared the area of the Indian Village (375 acres) on the Cheboigan (Burt Lake) to be regarded as an "Indian Preserve" or reservation. That was the INTENT of both documents and that fact was passed down from generation to generation by the "Oral Tradition" of the band's elders. When signed, the literacy of the Burt Lake Band signers was such that only a mark was placed on the document, but that was a mark of faith, one that meant there was trust in what was said (what was intended) and agreed to (in 1836 and again in 1855) The treaty language was thought by the Native signers to be in perpetuity; however, that did not happen.

The area of Indian Point on Burt Lake's western shore has been shown by archaeologists to possess pottery fragments that date back over 500 years. Soil samples reveal that the existence of charcoal deposits existing in the same area due to periodic fires being set to help clear the land for cultivation. These fires were set by Native people historians refer to as the "Chaboiganing Band of Ottawa and Chippewa Indians," and today referred to as the Burt Lake Band.

This land area of the Burt Lake Band was approximately 20 miles inland, due south of the Michigan's Straits of Mackinac, an area of water separating Lake Michigan to the west from Lake Huron to the east. The Burt Lake Band's Indian Point was located on a peninsula of land in Burt Lake that was part of the "Inland Waterway Route." It had been used for centuries by Native people for transportation, and then later by summer tourists for travel throughout the area's interconnecting rivers and lakes.

== The Act ==
On Monday, October 15, 1900, during the morning hours, a contingent of white men from the Cheboygan, Michigan area came to the small settlement on Indian Point, called Indian Village. They came to remove the inhabitants from their homes and fields. All who lived there were of Ottawa or Chippewa blood and were members of the Burt Lake Band of Indians. Leading the group of men was Cheboygan lumberman, banker, and land speculator John Walter McGinn. He had a two-year-old writ of assistance issued in 1898 by Circuit Court Judge Oscar Adams. McGinn had summoned the county sheriff, Fred Ming and his deputies to remove all villagers from the land he now claimed to own through his purchases of (supposed delinquent) "tax titles." Ming and his deputies sat the household possessions of the nineteen families in front of their cabin homes and one by one, McGinn set fire to the houses. Only the St. Mary's Catholic Mission Church built in 1838 with aid from Bishop Frederic Baraga survived. It later became the Ming pig barn when he later built his farm on the nineteen evictee's property.

Following the October "Burn-Out" by McGinn, many of the families moved in with Burt Lake Band members who lived close by on Indian Trail road, just north of Indian Village. Others took up residence further to the west in Middle or Cross village. As time progressed, the Burn-Out families built new homes on the land owned by the Massey and Nongueskwa families along Indian Trail (today it is Indian Road). This area then became known as Indianville. In 1908, a second St. Mary's Catholic Church was built there and remains active today.

In 1911, the United States Attorney General, on behalf of the Burt Lake Band, instigated legal action against John W. McGinn in the Eastern District Court of Michigan-Bay City, Michigan. A "Bill of Complaint" was filed on June 22, 1911, by Frank H. Watson, District Attorney for the Eastern District of Michigan asking that the land expropriated by McGinn in 1900 be returned to its nineteen owners. The federal government's cases hinged on the premise that: "all the deeds and attempted conveyances made by the persons named as grantees in the deeds... and the petition for a Writ of Assistance used by McGinn to force the assistance of the Cheboygan County Sheriff were wholly null and void. It was the federal government's claim that the Burt Lake Band had been granted the Indian Village area land by treaty and should not have been evicted for non-payment of property taxes. Burt Township, Cheboygan County and the State of Michigan had errored in assessing the federally recognized Burt Lake Band's Indian Village property. Added to that was that at no time did the Governor of Michigan, whose name in perpetuity was on the six in question land deeds, receive notice of a property tax assessment on the lands (which all had been placed in trust to his office). Nor did the Governor received any legal notice that the six land deeds in question were delinquent in any wrongly assessed property taxes.

== Consequences ==
The first sovereign nations the newly created United States of America dealt with was the North American-based "Indigenous People" who had arrived first in the New World. The 1789 adopted United States Constitution followed the established European tradition begun by the French in North America of dealing with the Native People encountered in the new country as separate and sovereign nations. Article 1, Section 8 of this document stated: "The Congress shall have power to- regulate commerce with foreign Nations, and among the several States, and with the Indian Tribes."

Article VI then stated:

This Constitution, and the Laws of the United States which shall be made in Pursuance thereof; and ALL TREATIES made, or which shall be made, under the Authority of the United States, shall be the SUPREME LAW OF THE LAND; and the Judges in every State shall be bound thereby, anything in the Constitution or Laws of any State to the Contrary notwithstanding.

The Territory of Michigan was organized as part of the Northwest Ordinance of 1789, one of the first acts signed by President George Washington under the newly ratified United States Constitution. In fact, the Congress of the United States reaffirmed the Northwest Ordinance under the Constitution meaning it could not later be repealed. Section 14, Article 3 stated:

The utmost good faith shall always be observed towards the Indians; their lands and property shall never be taken from them without their consent; and, in their property, rights, and liberty, they shall never be invaded or disturbed, unless in just and lawful wars authorized by Congress; but laws founded in justice and humanity, shall from time to time be made for preventing wrongs being done to them, and for preserving peace and friendship with them.

A few years later the Treaty of Greenville was signed in 1795, Article 5 of this treaty stated:

To prevent any misunderstanding about the Indian lands relinquished by the United States in the fourth article, it is now explicitly declared, that the meaning of that relinquishment is this: the Indian tribes who have a right to those lands, are quietly to enjoy them, hunting, planting, and dwelling thereon, so long as they please, without any molestation from the United States; but when those tribes, or any of them, shall be disposed to sell their lands, or any part of them, they are to be sold only to the United States; and until such sale, the United States will protect all the said Indian tribes in the quiet enjoyment of their lands against all citizens of the United States, and against all other white persons who intrude upon the same. And the said Indian tribes again acknowledge themselves to be under the protection of the said United States, and no other power whatever.

For many years before and after the arrival of Europeans in the area of Mackinac Island (1640s) located in the upper region of the lower peninsula of Michigan, the Ottawa and Chippewa people of the area existed in small villages of 100 to 200 people. These villages were politically organized not as one tribe of people in the area of Michigan but rather as small individual bands of Ottawa or of Chippewa. Many of these were migrating bands who would come to northern Michigan for the summer months to fish and gather.

The group of Ottawa and some Chippewa people who gathered along the western shoreline of the large inland body of water first known as Cheboigan Lake began to make a permanent village there by the early 1800s. They girdled the large trees and burned the area to clear the land, planting corn, beans and squash. They fished the inland lake, hunted, gathered maple syrup, and lived a life rather isolated from other Native people of the north. By the 1830s, they were known to the federal government as the Cheboigan Lake or Sheboygan band of Ottawa Indians.

Their small village became known as Indian Village and was located on a peninsula that jutted out into Cheboigan Lake (later to be called Burt Lake). This location in the center of the Tip of the Mitt's "inland waterway" extending from Lake Michigan northeast to Lake Huron made the village a key spot in the avenue of trade for the Ottawa People. Its remoteness made it one of the last areas to be visited by the officials of the new American government in Washington, D.C.

The Mackinac Indian Agency of Mackinac Island was the Bureau of Indian Affairs in Washington, D.C.'s official representative to the many Native people of the northern Michigan area. The Superintendent of Indian Affairs for the Mackinac Agency in 1836 was Henry Schoolcraft. The government's Indian policy at the time was one of removal of all Native people to the west of the Mississippi. Schoolcraft (married to a Native woman) was somewhat sympathetic to the desire of the Michigan Native people to remain in their historic homeland. He was instrumental in helping accomplish the Treaty of Washington signed in the summer of 1836. The treaty ceded to the United States a vast territory of more than 13 million acres or about one-third of the present state of Michigan. It was then a territory and thought to be worth many millions of dollars (mostly its timber). Schoolcraft believed that the Ottawa and Ojibwe (Chippewa) people would be better off learning subsistence farming, and that meant giving up their widespread hunting lands.

At that time, the Ottawa and Chippewa people of the Michigan Territory knew that they needed to deal with the federal government since there was an ever-increasing number of white settlers encroaching upon their hunting lands. They also recognized their growing reliance on manufactured goods as a result of their relationship with the fur trading companies they had long dealt with. This relationship had placed them in great debt to the various fur companies. The system of the "company store" was such that when the fur trade began to dwindle in the early 1830s, the Native people had less and less ability to repay for goods they had grown fond of possessing and had bought on credit.

In the summer of 1836 the Treaty of Washington was agreed to by United States government's chosen Ottawa and Chippewa representatives in the nation's capitol. For the land ceded (almost one-third of present Michigan) Article 2 of the treaty stated:

One tract of fifty thousand acres to be located on Little Traverse bay: one tract of twenty thousand acres to be located on the north shore of Grand Traverse bay,... one tract of one thousand acres to be located by Chingassanoo,—or the Big Sail, on the Cheboigan.

This meant each band of Ottawa or Ottawa and Chippewa were to receive land preserved for their use.

In addition, Article 4 stated:

In consideration of the foregoing cessions, the United States engage to pay to the Ottawa and Chippewa Nations, the following sums, namely: 1st- An annuity of thirty thousand dollars per annum, in specie, for twenty years; eighteen thousand dollars, to be paid to the Indians between Grand River and the Cheboigan....

Different Article 2 language was then added by the United States Senate before ratifying it. This happened after it had been signed by the Ottawa and Chippewa representatives. It read:

"From the cession aforesaid the tribes reserve for their own use, to be held in common the following tracts for the term of five years from the date of the ratification of this treaty, and no longer; unless the United States shall grant them permission to remain on said lands for a longer period..." This change in language which brought the idea of removal to the west caused the Cheboigan Lake band of Ottawa to devise a strategy for survival in Michigan.

Taking the advice of the Mackinac Agency Indian agent assigned to the Cheboigan band, the villagers decided to pool their annuity monies to buy the land parcels which they had turned from forest into farms and a small village. On February 1, 1848, the first of six separate land patents were purchased by the "Sheboygan Band of Indians of whom Kie-she-go-way is Chief." This was Certificate No 6293 and encompassed 71 acres of what would be a total of 375 purchased acres. The last of the six parcels was purchased on April 1, 1850, and was Certificate No. 7095. It was signed by then President Zachary Taylor. The first certificate was signed by President James Polk.

All six land patent certificates contained the wording:

...the United States of America...has given and granted unto the said Governor of Michigan and his successors in trust...the said tract above described to have and to hold in trust for the Sheboygan Indians forever.

The oral tradition of the Ottawa People never forgot this wording and the wording of the 1836 and 1855 treaties along with the true intent of what all these paper legal documents meant. The land at Indian Village, on Indian point, along the shoreline of Burt Lake in Cheboygan County, Michigan was to be theirs forever. It was given to them as part of the 1836 Treaty of Washington and the 1855 Treaty of Detroit. On top of that, it had been outright purchased with their 1836 federal treaty annuity money between February 1848 and April 1850. The wording of the July 31, 1855, Treaty of Detroit began with:

In view of the existing condition of the Ottawas and Chippewas, and of their legal and equitable claims against the United States, it is agreed between the contracting parties as follows:
Article 1.
The United States will withdraw from sale for the benefit of said Indians...Seventh. For the Cheboygan band, townships 35 and 36 north, range 3 west.

These two townships were exactly where the Burt Lake (Cheboigan Lake) Band of Ottawa had their Indian Village settlement and their cultivated fields. All was within the parcels of land they had purchased between 1848 and 1850- a total of 375 acres.

The wording of Article 5 was asked for by the Ottawa and Chippewa heads of the various "bands" or groups of Indians to make sure to the government officials that from the signing date of July 31, 1855, on, the federal officials would recognize and understand the actual political organization (units) of the various Michigan Indians. Unlike other parts of the United States, Michigan Indians organized themselves by "bands," not "tribes. In 1836 these various "bands" were misnamed by government officials as being "Ottawa and Chippewa Tribes." This was done strictly for the convenience of the federal government in making the treaty negotiations go easier. But, it was a false labeling and the signers of the 1855 Treaty specifically asked that it be changed for posterity. ARTICLE 5 read:

The tribal organization of said Ottawa and Chippewa Indians, except so far as may be necessary for the purpose of carrying into effect the provisions of this agreement, is hereby dissolved; and if at any time hereafter, further negotiations with the United States, in reference to any matters contained herein, should become necessary, no general convention of the Indians shall be called; but such as reside in the vicinity of any usual place of payment,...

The Burt Lake Band was so adamant about this wording and the fact that they wanted to be sure their 1836 Treaty granted land and that their 1848-1850 purchased land would be protected that they did not sign the 1855 Treaty until the summer of 1856—one year later. However, even with all the precautions taken, the Indian Village on Indian Point was destroyed on October 15, 1900.

The wording of Article 5, put there by the federal government treaty negotiators at the request of the Ottawa and Chippewa headmen (chiefs) in July 1855 actually ended up having the exact opposite effect. The two Bureau of Indian Affairs Commissioners George W. Manypenny, and Henry C. Gilbert were both out of office by the end of 1857. Their INTENT of the meaning behind the Article 5 language seemed to go with them since the Bureau of Indian Affairs later had trouble interpreting Article 5.

Article 5 in the 1855 Treaty of Detroit was never meant to convey that the Ottawa and Chippewa Indians of Michigan were to no longer exist as a political unit. It meant to correct the 1836 Treaty language defect which referred to the Ottawa and Chippewa "bands"' of Indians as each one tribe. This had never been and was only the artificial creation of federal officials to facilitate a quicker negotiation of the 1836 treaty. In 1855, the precedent (though wrong) from 1836 was kept and the federal Commissioner for Indian Affairs Henry Gilbert used the terms Ottawa and Chippewa Tribe in the treaty document. The fifth article was meant to set the record straight—it did not.

Throughout the 1850s and 1860s the federal government officials at the Bureau of Indian Affairs continued to recognize the Burt Lake (Cheboigan) band of Ottawa Indians centered at Indian Village on Indian Point. A new treaty with them was supposed to take place in the summer of 1864 but federal negotiators only got as far north that summer and fall as the Saginaw Bay area to negotiate with the Chippewa bands at Black River, Swan Creek and Saginaw. The October 18, 1864 TREATY WITH THE CHIPPEWA OF SAGINAW, SWAN CREEK, AND BLACK RIVER used the term "bands" to describe the three mentioned Indian political units as stipulated in the 1855 Treaty. Soon to be named Mackinac Indian Agency superintendent Richard M. Smith, who had been present in Detroit during the creation of Article 5 in 1855, was also present for the October 1864 negotiations in Michigan, again acting as a secretary.

The other Ottawa bands of Michigan including the Burt Lake Band were left out of being able to negotiate new 1864 treaties and by 1869 the newly appointed head of the Bureau of Indian Affairs, Ely Parker, decided no new negotiations in Michigan were necessary. Then, in 1871, the now Superintendent of the Mackinac Indian Agency, Major James W. Long, in reading the 1855 Treaty of Detroit language written down in Article 5 interpreted it to mean that with the last annuity payments guaranteed in the early Michigan treaties, the Indians of Michigan became United States citizens and all Native political organizations then were extinguished in Michigan. Long had not been present during either treaty in 1836 and 1855 and did not understand the INTENT of Article 5. To add to the problem, in 1872 the Secretary of the Interior Columbus Delano picked up on the Long misinterpretation and he voiced the opinion that the Ottawa and Chippewa Indians of Michigan no longer belonged to any political organization—"bands" included. Even though this was not true, and even though the Michigan Indians were not yet true citizens of the United States, Long's and Delano's misinterpretations began to become part of the Bureau of Indian Affairs official policy.

To add to the incorrect factual beliefs surrounding the Ottawa and Chippewa in Michigan, the state constitution of 1850 had language in it that some interpreted to mean all Native males of Michigan were granted citizenship. Thus, all were able to vote in state and local elections. Again, this was not a factual INTENT of the language written into the 1850 document. It was put there to cover the Metis (1/2 white 1/2 Indian) large population of the upper peninsula who had become the major populace of that area due to the fur trade with French Montreal. Thus, some area in Michigan allowed the Native vote, while others did not. It seemed to be under "local option." If the Native vote could be used for political convenience it was allowed to take place. That was true in Cheboygan County where the Burt Lake band members were allowed to vote.

From 1860 until October 1900, the residents of Indian Village, living in some twenty cabins in all, farmed, raised livestock, hunted, gathered, fished and had a self-sustained life. That life also included selling craft ware (baskets, herbs, blankets) to visiting summer tourists who stopped by the village on day cruises along the "Inland Waterway" from Crooked Lake northeast to the city of Cheboygan. Many of the men of the village worked in the local lumber mills or camps and to supplement their farming. Their land on the peninsula was valuable either for the red oak timber that grew there or the potential shoreline real estate lots that could be sold to the ever-increasing summer tourists.

After the Burn-Out, the Cheboigan/Sheboygan/Cheboygan/Burt Lake Band of Indians, with its century-old village now gone, began a gradual decline in population. However, the 1910 census of Burt Township, Cheboygan County, Michigan showed close to 130 Native people living in close proximity to Indian Point, just north on Indian Trail road. Instead of listing farming as the main occupation of this settlement's males, as had been shown in the 1900 Indian Village census, lumbering occupations were now listed. The 1930 census showed twelves families of Natives centered around the St. Mary's Catholic Church on Indian Road with six heads of household being listed as farmers. By the 1940 census, Indian Road was home to forty-eight Native residents with six heads of households. Two were listed as farmers and the others as laborers.

By the late 1970s the Burt Lake Band of Ottawa and Chippewa Indians was a scattered band of descendants of the original Indian Village residents of October 1900. On October 5, 1977, Margaret (Nongueskwa) Martell, daughter of John and Jennie Nonqueskwa of Indianville in Burt Township (born there in 1920), organized a meeting in Lansing, Michigan of all descendants she could find from the Burt Lake Band of Indian Village. In early January 1978 (January 14, 1978), twenty-seven descendants (or in-laws of descendants) of Indian Village residents signed a petition requesting the Native American Rights Fund to represent the "Cheboygan Band of Ottawa" in a lawsuit pertaining to the parcels of land lost to John W. McGinn as a consequence of his Burn-Out action in October 1900.

Martell was helped in her efforts by Louise (Cabinaw) Reznick, daughter of Louis and Margaret Cabinaw, who had been appointed by Governor G. Mennen Williams in 1956 to be a paid employee of the Governor's Commission on Indians. The Governor was looking into compensation for the Burt Lake Band as a result of the 1900 Burn-Out. Throughout the 1960s and 1970s Louise Reznick worked on behalf of the Burt Lake Band educating descendants of the original Indian Village residents.

Along with Martell and Reznick, Loretta Massey Parkey became involved in the effort to revitalize the Burt Lake Band in 1978. She lived on Indian Road close to the second St. Mary's Catholic Church. By the 1980s the Burt Lake Band had incorporated as the Burt Lake Band of Ottawa and Chippewa Indians (July 16, 1980), a non-profit organization in the State of Michigan. The organizing group worked with Michigan Indian Legal Services headquartered in Lansing, Michigan to help bring this about. By 1986 the State of Michigan formally recognized the Burt Lake Band of Ottawa and Chippewa Indians, but after petitioning the federal government for federal recognition on September 6, 1985, the petition was finally declined on September 21, 2006. It was declined on the grounds that the Burt Lake Band failed to meet the Bureau of Indian Affairs established criterion for federal recognition. The rules established by the Bureau in 1978 as 25 C.F.R. (Criteria For Recognition) Section 83.t A, B, C, D, E, F, G lay out how the process by which an American Indian Tribe can by be federally acknowledged.

The Burt Lake Band was found to meet the criteria of 83.7a, 83.7.d, 83.7f and 83.7g but the Bureau found determined 83.7 b, 83.7 c and 83.7e. Failure to meet any of the seven mandatory criteria meant that the petitioning group (The Burt Lake Band of Indians) did not exist as an Indian tribe within the meaning of the 1978 federal law. The criteria which was met included the Indian entity (Burt Lake Band) had been observed by outsiders to exist on a continuous basis since the 1917 lawsuit brought by the Attorney General of the United States. The band had a constitution which described its membership rules and governing procedures. The band also had an official membership that was not principally made up of members of other federally recognized tribes and the Burt Lake Band had not been expressly terminated or forbidden by Congressional legislation.

However, it was the Bureau's belief that the band did not sufficiently show enough evidence to demonstrate a large portion of its membership list existed as a community at present. The band did not provide sufficient evidence that it had a continuous group of identified leaders since 1917 to the present and finally, that only 70 percent of its members could demonstrate descent from Indian Village residents who were part of the historic tribe centered along the shore of Burt Lake (Lake Cheboigan).

== Afterword ==
A long, drawn out court fight finally ended in May 1917. On May 31, Federal District Court Judge Clarence W. Sessions (sitting in for Judge Arthur J. Tuttle who had earlier recused himself from the case) issued an eight-page decree in favor of the defendant John W. McGinn's estate. McGinn had died in January 1912. By then his wife and his son John T. McGinn had built a large lake shore farm house on the former property of the Burt Lake Band and had also built two barns and some outbuildings on the cleared parcels of land once farmed by the Indian Village residents.

The Session's ruling stated:

The Cheboygan Indians were a small band and have never been treated, considered or recognized as a nation or a tribe. Their lands, whether held as communal property by the band or in severalty (held separately) by the individual members, were not tribal lands and hence were not within the prohibition of the General Act of Congress forbidding conveyance of lands belonging to a nation or tribe of Indians without consent of the Government. Whatever may have been the earlier status of these Indians, by treaty, in 1855, the tribal organization of the Ottawa and Chippewa Indians of Michigan was dissolved... To all appearances the Federal Government abandoned and relinquished all right of guardianship over these Indians and their property more than a third of a century before the present suit was instituted...The question upon which the decision of this case hinges is whether these lands were taxable. That question must be answered in the affirmative... Upon the full performance of treaty (1855) obligations, the dissolution of the tribal organization of the Ottawa and Chippewa Indians of Michigan, and their final attainment of citizenship (1850 Michigan constitution)... the Government relinquished its right of guardianship over these Indians and their property and cannot now represent them...A decree will be entered dismissing the Bill of Complaint without costs.

The May 31, 1917 decree by Judge Sessions was based on his use of gathered facts that led him to believe the federal government had no standing in the case. The same facts led him to believe that the "Burt Lake Band of Cheboygan Indians" had no legal status as an entity. However, the work by noted scholar and historian Richard White (now at Stanford University-CA) in 1978 titled, "The Ethnohistory of the Burt Lake Indians" shows clear evidence that Judge Sessions used incorrect data in making his May 1917 ruling.

The Burt Lake Band of Cheboygan Indians was and had been a political unit in Michigan prior and after the Treaty of 1855 and thus a "sovereign nation entity" protected by any and all Native American treaties enjoined in by the United States federal government. Sessions statement that, "...Whatever may have been the earlier status of these Indians, by treaty, in 1855, the tribal organization of the Ottawa and Chippewa Indians of Michigan was dissolved..." did not represent the true intent of the wording he used as his basis for his 1917 decree. The language used in ARTICLE 5 of the 1855 Treaty of Detroit, according to White's research of the original treaty journals kept that summer in Detroit by Bureau of Indian Affairs secretaries John Logan Chipman and Richard W. Smith), was intended to correct a wrong that had been made in the 1836 Treaty of Washington. That treaty stated that the Michigan Ottawa and Michigan Chippewa existed as "unified tribes," and that was absolutely incorrect. At no time had the Ottawa people or the Chippewa people of the Michigan Territory ever existed under a unified Ottawa Tribe or a Chippewa Tribe.

Michigan Native people had lived in the Great Lakes area since the early 1600s and had always existed as small bands or villages, or both, separated by distance to enhance their ability to hunt, fish and gather. As needed, these bands might have migrated to different spots according to the seasons or for better hunting grounds. At no time did any of these bands exist under common leadership by one chief. The Treaty of 1836 used the terms Ottawa Tribe and Chippewa Tribe only as a convenience for government negotiators. Since the 1855 treaty was based on the earlier 1836 document, the use of these terms continued but Article 5 was put into the 1855 document on request of the Native leaders to correct the earlier misnomer of tribe.

White's research found the intent of the Article 5 language was soon lost in the bureaucratic halls of Washington and by the time Judge Sessions did his research for a judgement in the United States Government vs. John W. McGinn case, he was using false facts provided to him by various government entities. The Burt Band had never been dissolved and furthermore, the parcels of land patented for the area of Indian Village on Indian Point had not been in "severalty" (individually) but issued to the Governor of Michigan in trust for the Cheboygan Indians of whom Kie-she-go-way is chief. There were six separate land patents issued this way from February 1848 until April 1850.

The Burt Lake Band of Ottawa and Chippewa Indians exist today as a State of Michigan recognized Band (1986) and since 1985 have been working to achieve re-recognition as a federally acknowledged Band by the Bureau of Indian Affairs.

== See also ==
- The Burt Lake Band of Chippewa and Ottawa Indians
