= St. Ignace Area Schools =

School district in Michigan, United States

Address
- West 429 Portage Road St. Ignace, Mackinac County, Michigan, 49781; United States

District information
- Grades: PreKindergarten–12
- Superintendent: Kari Visnaw
- Schools: 3
- Budget: $7,954,000 2022–2023 expenditures
- NCES District ID: 2600012

Students and staff
- Students: 360 (2024–2025)
- Teachers: 30.62 (on an FTE basis) (2024–2025)
- Staff: 57.4 FTE (2024–2025)
- Student–teacher ratio: 11.76 (2024–2025)
- District mascot: Saints

Other information
- Website: stignace.eupschools.org

St. Ignace Area Schools is a public school district in Mackinac County, in the Upper Peninsula of Michigan. It includes St. Ignace, the majority of Brevort Township, and the majority of St. Ignace Township.

== History ==
The first class graduated from LaSalle High School in 1892. As of 1895, St. Ignace's public school district had three schools and 501 students enrolled, including at LaSalle school. LaSalle School, named after 17th-century French explorer René-Robert Cavelier, Sieur de La Salle, was built in 1888 at the corner of Spring and Chambers Streets. It served as the high school until fall 1962, when the current high school building opened. In September 1989, voters passed a $4.3 million bond issue to fund construction of a middle school, to open in 1991.

== Schools ==
Schools in St. Ignace Area Schools district share a campus on Portage Street west of St. Ignace.

Schools in St. Ignace Area Public Schools district
| School | Address | Notes |
|---|---|---|
| LaSalle High School | W443 Portage Street, St. Ignace | Grades 9–12 |
| St. Ignace Elementary and Middle School | W429 Portage Street, St. Ignace | Grades PreK-8 |
