= Rabbit's Back =

Geological formation

Coordinates: 45.92168°N 84.72227°W

Rabbit's Back (Ojibwe: Waaboozonenamadabidneyaashi) is an elevated promontory, or peninsula, that extends eastward into Lake Huron. It is located 4 miles (6.4 km) north of St. Ignace in the U.S. state of Michigan.

The promontory separates two shallow bays of the extreme northwestern coast of Lake Huron, Evergreen Shores to the south and Horseshoe Bay to the north. From nearby Mackinac Island the promontory is said to appear like the back of a crouching rabbit, hence the name Rabbit's Back. Like nearby Castle Rock, the promontory is a somewhat erosion-resistant mass of brecciated Straits of Mackinac limestone.

The summit of the promontory is 696 feet (212 meters) above sea level, and 115 feet (35 meters) above the level of nearby Lake Huron. The promontory is located within Hiawatha National Forest.

== See also ==
- Castle Rock (Michigan)
- Straits of Mackinac
- Mackinac Island
