= Sault Tribe of Chippewa Indians =

Sault Ste. Marie Tribe of Chippewa Indians of Michigan Baawiting Anishinaabeg (Ojibwe)
- Reservation
- Flag
- Interactive map of Sault Ste. Marie Tribe of Chippewa Indians of Michigan
- Federally recognized: September 7, 1972
- Headquarters: Sault Ste. Marie
- Subdivisions: 5 Units

Government
  - Body: Board of Directors
  - Chairperson: Austin Lowes

Population (2010)Enrolled members
  - Total: 40,000
- Time zone: ET/EDT
- Website: www.saulttribe.com

The Sault Ste. Marie Tribe of Chippewa Indians (pronounced "Soo Saint Marie", Ojibwe: Baawiting Anishinaabeg), commonly shortened to Sault Tribe of Chippewa Indians or the more colloquial Soo Tribe, is a federally recognized Native American tribe in what is now known as Michigan's Upper Peninsula. The tribal headquarters is located within Sault Ste. Marie, the major city in the region, which is located on the St. Marys River.

Originally a part of the homelands of the Oc̣eṭi Ṡakowiƞ (Dakota, Lakota, Nakoda, or Sioux), who were pushed westward by the Anishinaabe Migration from the east coast, this location became known as Bawating by the Anishinaabe (the Ojibwe or Chippewa), who arrived there before Europeans showed up in the mid-to-late 16th century. Bawating, sometimes seen written as Baawiting or Bahweting, is an Ojibwe word meaning "The Gathering Place." The Chippewa participated in trading with other tribes, and later with the French, British and American traders here in turn.

The Sault Tribe of Chippewa Indians is the largest federally recognized tribe in Michigan, outnumbering the next largest tribe, the Pokagon Band of Potawatomi Indians, by a scale of about five to one. It was recognized in 1972 with five units in seven counties. In 1979 the tribal council included the Mackinac Band as members, nearly doubling its enrollment. The tribe's revenues from its Kewadin Casinos has enabled it to establish health centers and invest in education for its members.

== Government ==
The Sault Tribe operates its own government, with regular elections for chairperson and council members. Council members represent the tribe's five units throughout seven counties in Michigan's Upper Peninsula. Over one half of the tribe's enrolled members reside outside the five units, but vote within those established units. They vote in a unit where they have significant ancestral or historic ties.

In 2012 the politician Aaron A. Payment was elected chairman by the largest majority in the tribe's modern history. He had first been elected to the Tribal Council in 1996. He was elected as chairman in 2004, defeating a 17-year incumbent. In 2008 he lost his race for re-election to Joe Eitrem, but was re-elected in 2012, 2016 and 2020.

The tribe operates its own police department and tribal court.

== History ==
For hundreds of years preceding modern European contact, the Sault (Soo) Band ancestors were part of the large Lake Superior Band of Chippewa Indians. The Ojibwe (known as Chippewa in the United States) were known to have migrated over centuries from the Atlantic Coast. They historically spoke the Ojibwe language, one of numerous Algonquian languages.

Chiefs whose signatories identified them as members of the Sault (Soo) Band and other bands were among those in the region signing treaties with the United States in 1820. Ancestors of the tribe are believed to have lived in the Great Lakes region since about 1200CE. They were part of a wide trading network.

The modern Sault Tribe is descended from Ojibwe ancestors who lived on Sugar Island in the St. Mary's River between the U.S. state of Michigan and the Canadian province of Ontario, and in the area.

The Sault Tribe gained federal recognition by the United States Commissioner of Indian Affairs on September 7, 1972. The tribe did not have a historic reservation from a previous treaty. As part of the process, the federal government took land in trust for the tribe by deed dated May 17, 1973, and approved by the Bureau of Indian Affairs on March 7, 1974.

The Commissioner of Indian Affairs formally declared the trust land to be a reservation for the tribe on February 20, 1975, with notice published in the Federal Register on February 27, 1975. The reservation land is located in both the city of Sault Ste. Marie and in Sugar Island Township, on Sugar Island (Sugar Island part at 46°28′19″N 84°12′44″W) east of the city.

== Enrollment ==
Since formal recognition in 1972, the tribe has increased in number of members. It has approximately 40,000 members on its rolls. In the 21st century, many Sault Tribe members live off-reservation in the Upper and Lower Peninsulas of Michigan, about one third live throughout the United States and Canada, and on other continents. At any given time, significant numbers are serving in the military.

In 1979 the Tribal Council passed a resolution allowing Mackinac Band members to enroll in the tribe, which doubled the number of enrolled members. In the 21st century, the Sault Tribe consists of more than 20 bands. There is also a significant and historic relation with Garden River First Nation, also known as Ketegaunseebee (Gitigaan-ziibi Anishinaabe in the Ojibwe language), an Ojibwa band located at Garden River 14 near Sault Ste. Marie, Ontario, Canada.

Several thousand Mackinac Band members continue to work to gain independent federal recognition. They have formed the Mackinac Bands of Chippewa and Ottawa Indians, which is state recognized.

== Economic development ==
Based on a 1993 compact with the state, the tribe operates five casinos under the Kewadin Casinos name in Sault Ste. Marie, St. Ignace, Manistique, Christmas and Hessel. The tribe also owns and manages hotels at the Christmas, Sault Ste. Marie and St. Ignace casino sites. These tribal enterprises operate at a profit, generating revenues for the tribe.

The tribe formerly operated Detroit's Greektown Casino, where they held a majority interest. They filed for bankruptcy protection in 2008, during the Great Recession. In June 2010 the Michigan Gaming Control Board voted 4–0 at a special meeting to transfer ownership from the Sault Ste. Marie Tribe of Chippewa Indians to new investors. The tribe's participation in the Greektown Casino created state support for authorization of three casinos in Detroit. These have provided the region and state with employment and income.

In 2011 the tribe said it was considering development of additional downstate casinos in Romulus and the state capital of Lansing. These were proposed to be built on land the tribe owned but which had not yet been put in trust by the federal government.

Both projects were challenged in court cases. Michigan Attorney General Bill Schuette contended that the Lansing project violated the Indian Gaming Regulatory Act and the 1993 compact which the tribe had made with Gov. John Engler when it established its first casinos. In September 2015 a judge dismissed the state's lawsuit seeking to block a casino in downtown Lansing. The mayor of Lansing has publicly supported the project, saying that the casino "would bring thousands of good-paying jobs to Lansing and fully fund the Lansing Promise to provide college scholarships for graduates of the city's schools." The casino is proposed to be built next to the Lansing Center, blocks from the state capitol building. The Department of Interior will take the land into trust which the Sault Tribe bought from Lansing.

== Services ==
The tribe has reinvested revenues from the casino/hotel operations to build infrastructure for the welfare and education of its people. It operates six health centers for its members, with locations in Sault Ste. Marie, St. Ignace, Manistique, Munising, Newberry, and Hessel. The tribe also has emphasized education for its youth, offering several college scholarships for members.

The tribe helped found the Joseph K. Lumsden Bahweting Anishnaabe Public School Academy in Sault Ste. Marie. This is operated independently as both a Bureau of Indian Affairs school and a Michigan charter school. It was founded to offer an alternative to Sault Ste. Marie Area Schools, from which "Chippewa County" Sault Tribe of Chippewa Indians students had a high drop-out rate. The school was renamed in 1998 to honor Lumsden, a late tribal leader who helped develop the tribe's first housing, education, and health programs.

Open to all students in the community, Bahweting has achieved progress. It offers an introduction to the Anishnaabe language, culture and values. The school was awarded the Governor of Michigan's Gold Apple Award for outstanding student performance in the ‘Most Improved’ category on the Michigan Education Assessment Program (MEAP) tests. The U.S. Department of Education gave it a Title I Distinguished School Award; it was one of 95 schools honored among the 48,000 Title I schools nationwide.

Other tribal endeavors include building the Chi Mukwa (Big Bear) Recreation Center in Sault Ste. Marie. It offers Olympic and NHL-size ice rinks, a basketball court, a volleyball court, aerobics room, and fitness areas.

The Tribe publishes a monthly newspaper, Win Awenen Nisitotung, which in Ojibwe means "he/she/or one, who well or fully understands." The newspaper is commonly referred to as the WAN.

The tribe operates four Midjim convenience stores; Sault Ste. Marie, St. Ignace, Christmas, and Marquette. These offer discounted gasoline and cigarettes for tribal members.
