= Sugar Loaf (Mackinac Island) =

Rock stack in Michigan, United States

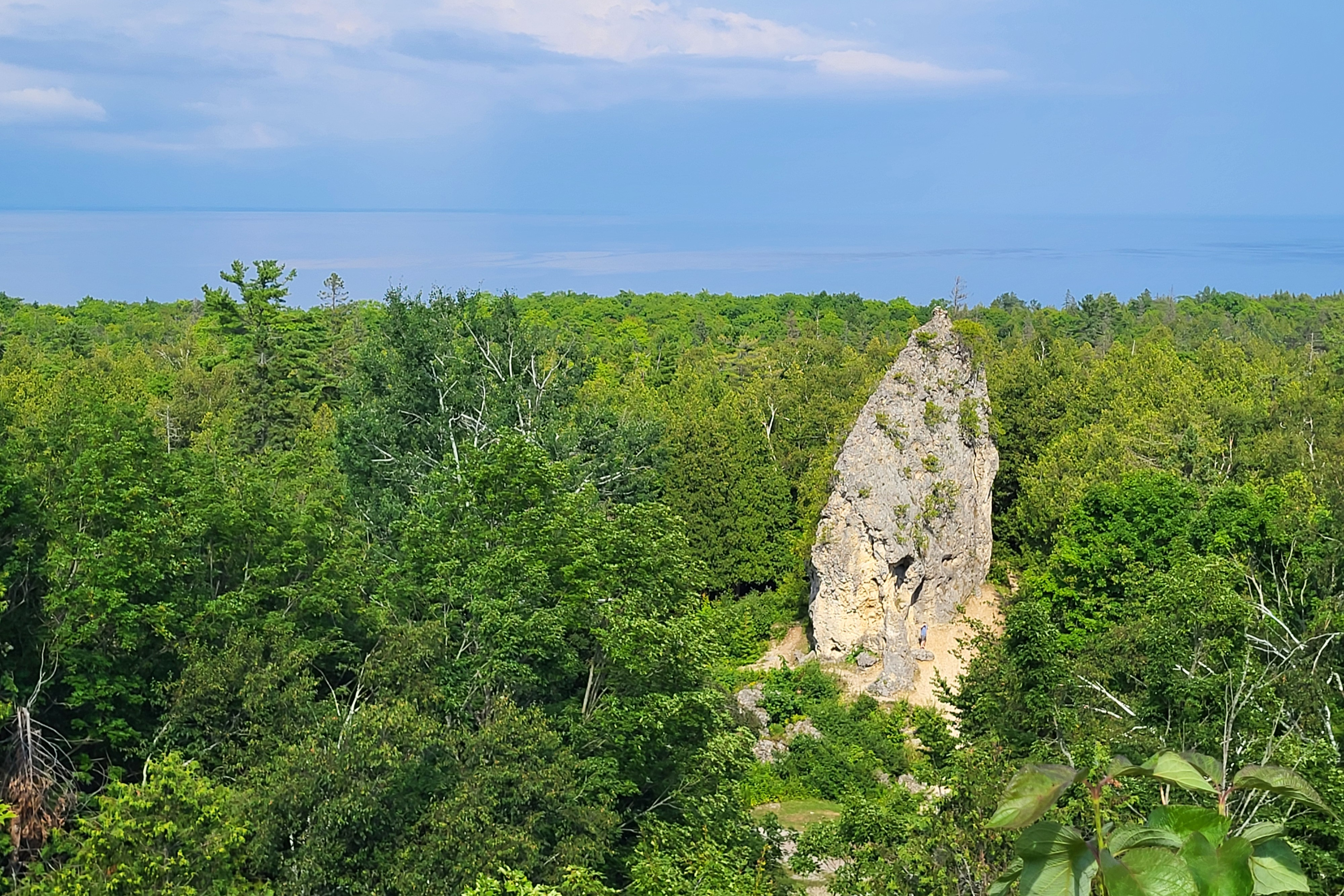
- View from Point Lookout

Highest point
- Elevation: 75 ft (23 m)
- Coordinates: 45°51′50″N 84°37′03″W

Geography
- Location within Michigan
- Location: Mackinac Island; Michigan, United States
- Sugar Loaf
- U.S. National Historic Landmark District – Contributing property
- Part of: Mackinac Island (ID66000397)
- Designated NHLDCP: October 15, 1966

Sugar Loaf is a 75-foot-high (23m) landlocked rock or stack in the interior of Mackinac Island in Lake Huron. Created by erosion during the period of postglacial Lake Algonquin, Sugar Loaf is the largest post-glacial erosion feature in the Straits of Mackinac.

The immense rock, which consists of resistant limestone breccia, was cut off from Ancient Mackinac Island or the Turtle's Back by the glacial meltwaters of Lake Algonquin. Polar storms released by the retreating ice sheet created erosional forces much stronger than any existing today on the Great Lakes.

The rock lies within the boundaries of the Mackinac Island State Park near the junction of Crooked Tree Road and Sugar Loaf Road. It can be seen from Point Lookout, near the Island's highest point.

== Etymology ==
The primary sweetening enjoyed by people of all backgrounds on the frontier Great Lakes was maple sugar, packed into cone-shaped baskets or makakoon of birchbark. Sugar Loaf Rock was named for its resemblance to one of these cones.

== Culture ==
A wide variety of stories were told by Native Americans and frontier dwellers about Sugar Loaf. It was said by some to be the home of Gitchie Manitou. Other tales suggested that the rock was the final form taken by a man afflicted with hubris who broke a taboo and was punished by being petrified into the form of a giant stone. The profile in limestone, affixed to the side of Sugar Loaf Rock, of a male face may have suggested this legend. The profile is said to be that of the lost soul, who can never escape the identity he took upon his moral condemnation.

Sugar Loaf Rock appears to have been used as a site of ritual burials and inhumations. In 1831, Alexis de Tocqueville and his friend Gustave de Beaumont visited Mackinac Island. De Beaumont reported that the rock was filled with "crevices and faults where the Indians sometimes deposed the bones of the dead." Any such deposits have long since disappeared.

A natural cave passes through Sugar Loaf from side to side, too small for passage by any but adventurous children.

== Sources ==
- George W. Pierson, "Tocqueville and Beaumont in America" (New York City: Oxford University Press, 1938), page 302.
