= Burt Lake Band of Ottawa and Chippewa Indians =

Organization in Michigan

- Flag of the Burt Lake Band of Ottawa and Chippewa Indians

Total population
- 323

Regions with significant populations
- United States (Michigan)

The Burt Lake Band of Ottawa and Chippewa Indians is a non-profit organization for people who self-identify as being of Ottawa and Chippewa descent. The organization's members live mostly in Emmet and Cheboygan counties. These two counties are located in the northernmost region of the Lower Peninsula of Michigan. Since 1985, the Burt Lake Band has petitioned the Bureau of Indian Affairs for re-recognition as a federally acknowledged band, a recognition first achieved in the 1830s. The organization is not recognized by the State of Michigan.

== History ==
The Ottawa people participated in the wars against Great Britain, the United Kingdom, and the United States in the 18th and early 19th centuries. By the mid-1830s the Ottawa and Chippewa people of the Michigan Territory sought negotiated treaty agreements with the United States. As a result, the Treaty of Washington was signed in the fall of 1836.

The 1836 Treaty of Washington was signed between the Anishinaabe of the Michigan Territory ceding some 13,000,000 acres of land to the US federal government. The ceded Anishinaabe land was located in the western two-thirds of the Lower Peninsula and the eastern half of the Upper Peninsula of Michigan. In all, it was almost a third of the state of Michigan's total land. In exchange, the Anishinaabeg were to receive annuity payments, supplies and a guarantee they could hunt and fish for perpetuity.

As part of the treaty agreement, the Burt Lake Band of Ottawa and Chippewa Indians were set aside a 1,000-acre reservation on Lake Cheboigan. The reservation was to last for 5 years. However, the United States failed to set aside the promised land. Beginning in February 1848 and ending in April 1850, the members of the Burt Lake Band used their annuity money from the 1836 treaty to buy six separate parcels of land totaling 375 acres. This was land on Indian Point along the shoreline of Lake Cheboigan.

A second treaty, the Treaty of Detroit, was signed in 1855 between the Anishinaabe of Michigan and the United States. The Chippewa and Ottawa people of the Burt Lake Band were provided land in two townships of land in Cheboygan County. These two townships were where the Band had earlier purchased six parcels of land. The treaty also specified that individual Anishinaabeg could select land allotments within the reservation. However, these individual holdings were not granted until 1875, some 3 years after an 1872 Act of Congress had been passed.

=== Burt Lake Burn-Out ===
During the years after the 1855 treaty, local officials of Cheboygan County imposed property taxes on the land parcels at the Indian Village settlement on Indian Point. As a result, the band had to sell land in order to pay back taxes. After buying the "tax titles," Cheboygan banker and land speculator John W. McGinn obtained a writ of assistance from the Circuit Court of Cheboygan in 1898. In October 1900, he used the writ to demand that Sheriff Fred Ming remove the residents of Indian Village. After Ming and his deputies did so, McGinn burned the village to the ground, an act that became known as the Burt Lake Burn-Out. The Chippewa and Ottawa people who lived there were forced to relocate to Indian Trail (now Indian Road), where other Burt Lake Chippewa and Ottawa people owned land.

The Burt Lake Band was previously known as the Cheboiganing Band of Ottawa & Chippewa Indians. This historic recognition existed before the 1836 Treaty of Washington and continued through 1917 when a lawsuit involving the Burt Lake Band was decided by federal Judge Clarence Sessions.

=== Recognition ===
After the burn-out, the Burt Lake Band, historically recognized by the federal government, became landless and lost its federal acknowledgment. Since 1985, the band has petitioned the Bureau of Indian Affairs (BIA) to regain its recognition, as the community has held together culturally for these decades. In 2006, the BIA rejected the band's request for recognition citing marriages into other bands and inconsistent paperwork. Later in May 2020, judge Amy Berman Jackson of the United States District Court for the District of Columbia said that the BIA's bans were "arbitrary and capricious", giving the BIA sixty days to respond to the band's petition.

== See also ==
- Burt Lake
- Burt Lake Burn-Out
