= Christmas, Michigan =

- Unincorporated community
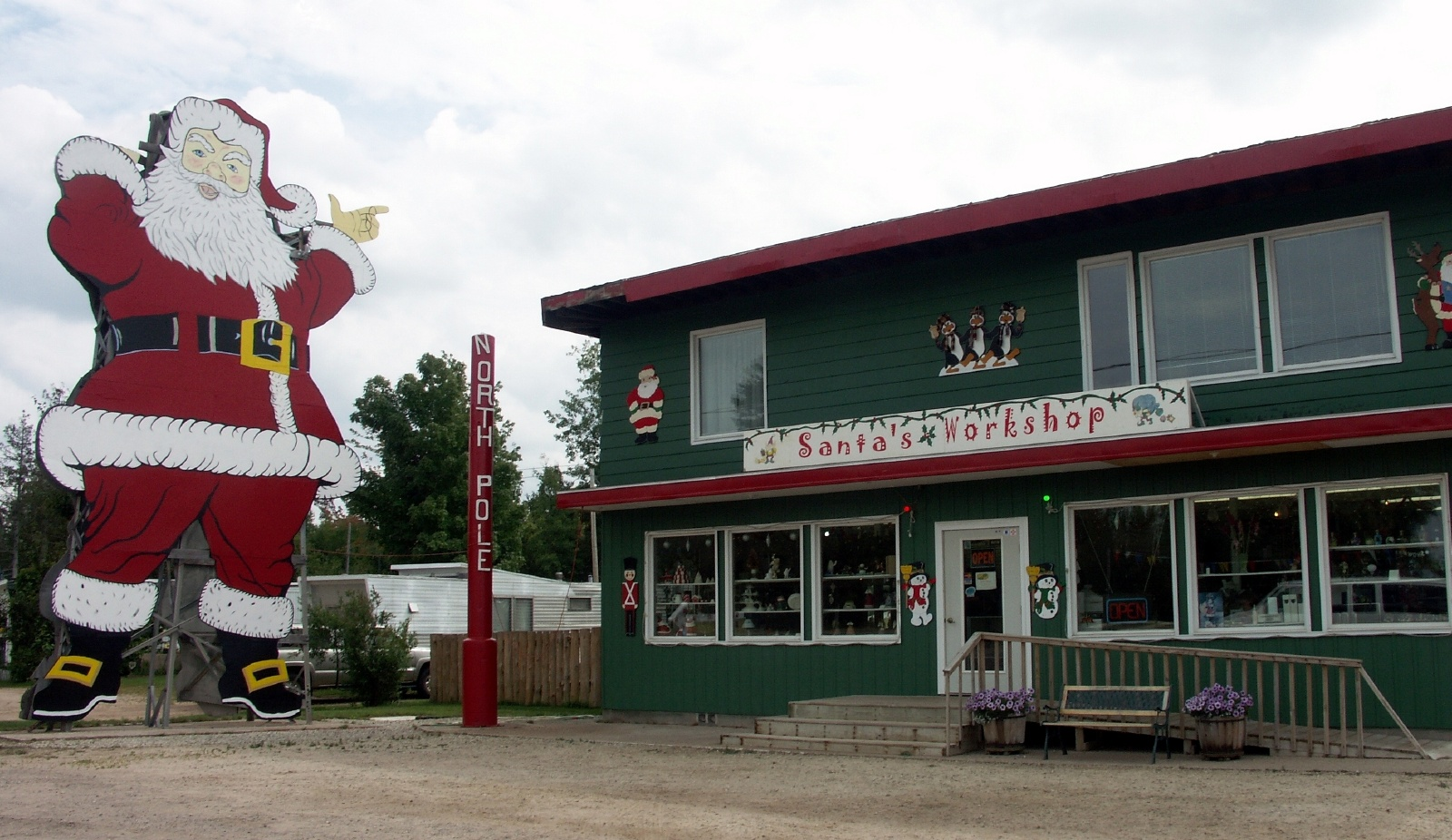
- Santa's Workshop in Christmas

- Location within Michigan Location within the United States
- Coordinates: 46°26′13″N 86°42′6″W
- Country: United States
- State: Michigan
- County: Alger
- Township: Au Train
- Established: 1938
- Elevation: 617 ft (188 m)
- Time zone: UTC-5 (Eastern (EST))
  - Summer (DST): UTC-4 (EDT)
- ZIP code(s): 49862 (Munising)
- Area code: 906
- GNIS feature ID: 1619505

Christmas is an unincorporated community in the Upper Peninsula of the U.S. state of Michigan. Christmas is located within Au Train Township in Alger County, and is located about 2.2 miles (3.5 km) northwest of the city of Munising. As an unincorporated community, Christmas has no legally defined boundaries or population statistics of its own.

Christmas has frequently been noted on lists of unusual place names.

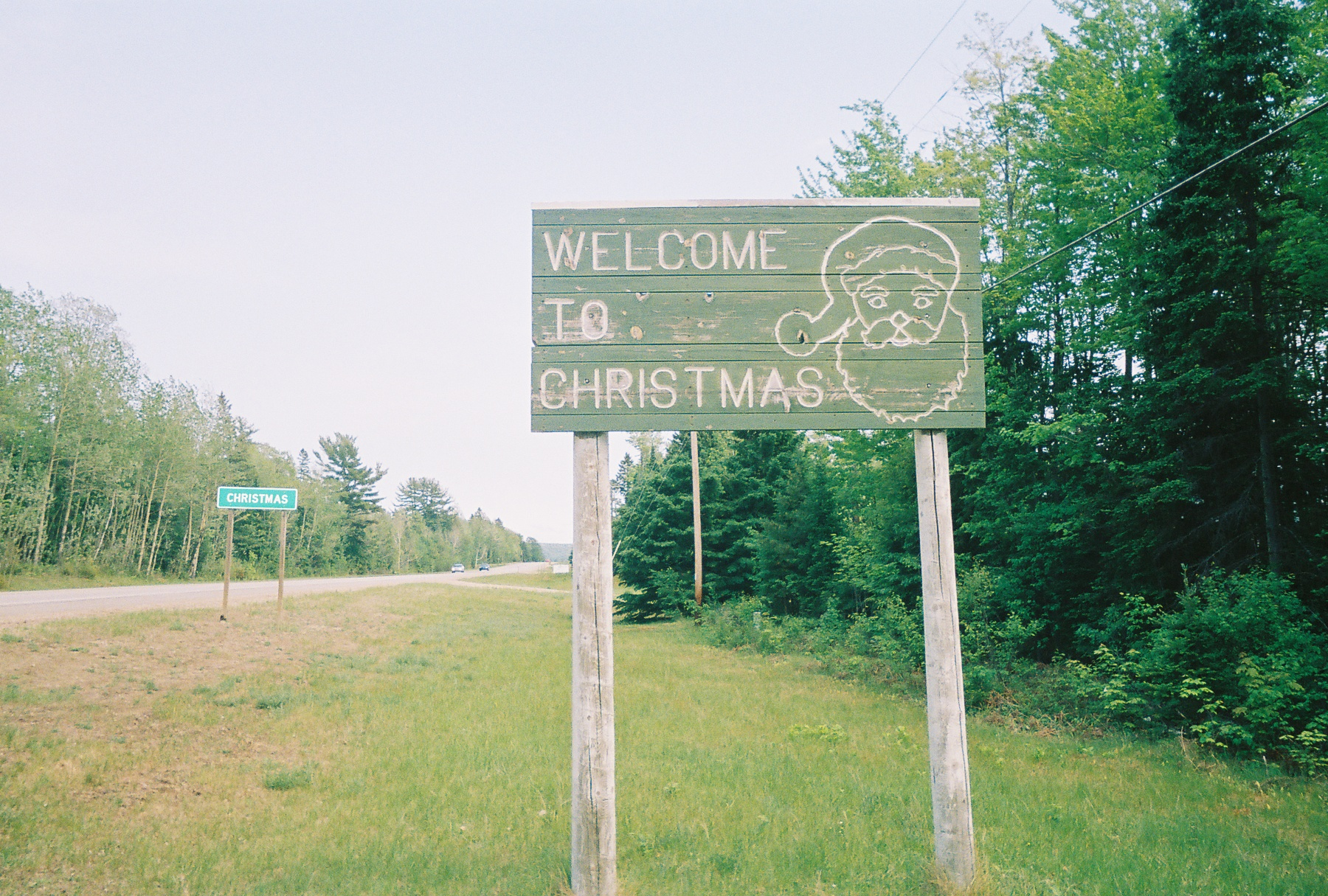
Welcome sign along M-28

== History ==
Christmas was established by Julius Thorson, of Munising, who built a factory for holiday-themed products here in 1938. The surrounding area took on the name of the holiday, although on September 19th,1940, a fire destroyed the factory, ending Thorson's operation.

== Geography ==
Christmas is located in Au Train Township, in central Alger County. The community is located along the shore of Bay Furnace, a small bay of Lake Superior.

=== Major highway ===
- M-28 / LSCT follows an east–west route through the community.

== See also ==
- Place names considered unusual
- Christmas Island
- Christmas, Florida
- North Pole, Alaska
- North Pole, New York
- Noel, Missouri
- Santa Claus, Arizona
- Santa Claus, Indiana
- Bronner's Christmas Wonderland
