= Mackinac Bands of Chippewa and Ottawa Indians =

Organization in Michigan

Mackinac Bands Of Chippewa And Ottawa Indians Inc.
- Type: Nonprofit, unrecognized tribe
- Tax ID no.: EIN 38-3460087
- Purpose: historical organization
- Location: Saint Ignace, Michigan, United States
- Official language: English
- Key people: Lisa Powers
- Main organ: Noodagan News
- Website: www.mackinacband.com

The Mackinac Bands of Chippewa and Ottawa Indians is a nonprofit organization and an unrecognized tribe. Located in Michigan, the Mackinac Band identifies as descendants of Bands 11-17 of Ojibwe and Odawa.

The organization is headquartered in St. Ignace, Mackinac County and has around 4,000 members. Today most members live in the Mackinac, Chippewa, Emmet, Cheboygan, and Presque Isle counties. However, many members are also located throughout the state of Michigan and the United States.

== Status ==
The Mackinac Band is neither a federally recognized tribe nor a state-recognized tribe.

John Causley, Jr. sent a letter of intent to petition the federal government for recognition of the Mackinac Bands of Chippewa and Ottawa Indians in 1998; however, the organization has not followed through with petition for recognition.

== Nonprofit ==
The Mackinac Bands Of Chippewa And Ottawa Indians Inc. is a tax-exempt nonprofit organization in Saint Ignace, Michigan. They incorporated in 2023, and their registered agent is Lisa Powers.

== History ==
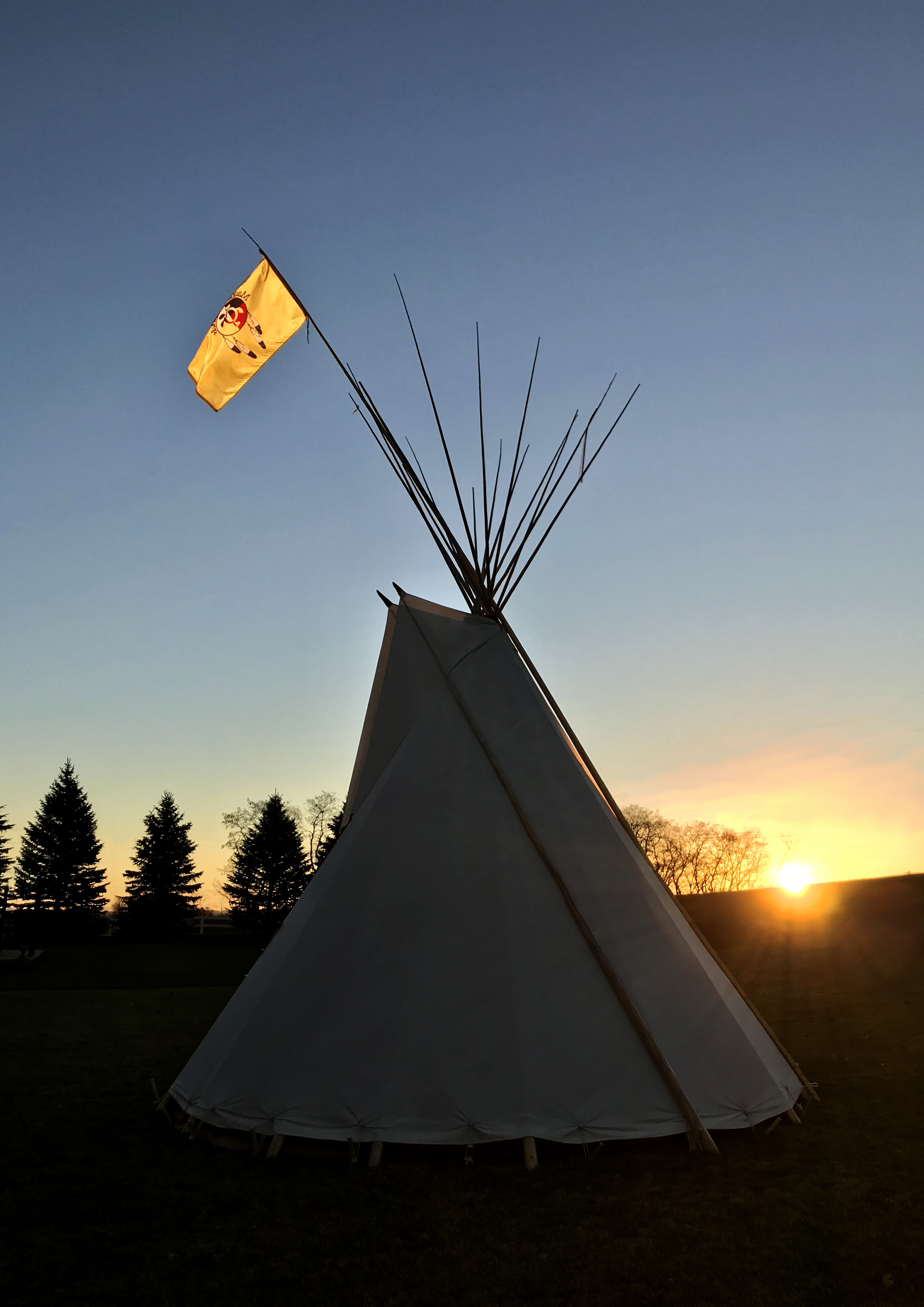
A tipi with Mackinac Bands' flag

The Mackinac Bands of Chippewa and Ottawa comprise Units 11 through 17 of the former Northern Michigan Ottawa Association, a confederation formed in 1948 to politically address the needs of the Anishinaabe peoples in Michigan.

The Mackinac Bands claims status as a successor apparent to the signatory tribe of the Treaty of Washington (1836) and Treaty of Washington (1855) with the United States of America.

The Michigan Department of Civil Rights and Michigan Indian Legal Services listed the Mackinac Bands of Chippewa and Ottawa Indians as a state historic tribe in 2012 and 2016.
