= Shake and Bake =

Shake 'n Bake is a flavored bread crumb-style coating for chicken and pork manufactured by Kraft Foods.

Shake 'n Bake, Shake & Bake or Shake and Bake may also refer to:

== Film and television ==
- Jimmy Dolan Shake and Bake, a key plot point in the 1994 film The Air Up There
- Shake and bake, a memorable phrase used in the 2006 movie Talladega Nights: The Ballad of Ricky Bobby
- "The Adventures of Shake and Bake", an SCTV skit parodying the Baconian theory of Shakespearean authorship

== Military ==
- A non-commissioned officer (NCO) of the United States Army who was promoted quickly through an NCO school with little actual time in the military
- Military slang for the combined use of high explosives and white phosphorus in Fallujah

== Music ==
- "Shake & Bake", a song by the Shrinking Dickies from the 1979 album The Incredible Shrinking Dickies
- "Shake & Bake", a song by Digital Underground from the 1993 album The Body-Hat Syndrome
- "Shake & Bake", a 2019 song by Left Lane Cruiser
- "Shake & Bake", a song by Amy Jack from the 2020 album Introducing Amy Jack
- "Shake 'N Bake", a song by Stevie Ray Vaughan from the 1985 album Archives

== People ==
- Archie Clark (basketball) (born 1941), American basketball player
- Glenn Doughty (born 1951), American football player
- Bake McBride (born 1949), American baseball player
- Vaughn Bean (born 1974), American professional boxer

== Pharmaceuticals ==
- An illicit method of making methamphetamine
- A nickname for the highly toxic fungicidal drug amphotericin B

== Sports ==
- In basketball; a behind the back crossover dribble
- In pickleball; a strategy used by the serving team

== Other uses ==
- A wildland firefighter's emergency fire shelter
- A type of snow coach
