= Hector J. Robinson Observatory =

Observatory in Michigan, US

- Location: Lincoln Park, Michigan
- Coordinates: 42°14′45″N 83°11′13″W
- Established: 1964
- Website: LPPS Hector J. Robinson Observatory

Telescopes
- Celestron C14 SCT

The Hector J. Robinson Observatory, located in Lincoln Park, Michigan, is an astronomical observatory that features a 14-inch (360 mm) Celestron SCT telescope. After a renovation, the observatory resumed operations in September 2009.

== History ==
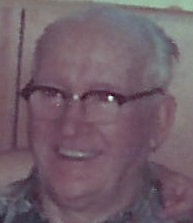
HJ Robinson, founder of the Observatory

=== First effort ===
By 1961, Hector Robinson's science classes had built several small telescopes and decided that a much larger telescope should be constructed. Initially, Robinson built and stored a large telescope in his classroom, to be carried outside on clear evenings. Funding for the construction came through donations from students and teachers.

This larger telescope was made of two pieces of Pyrex glass, 12.5-inch-diameter (320 mm), 2 1/8 inches (54 mm) thick and weighing 28 pounds (13 kg). The mirror blank was ground, tested and polished to achieve the right parabolic curve by teams of students using various grades of carborundum. A cradle and equatorial mount were added for portability.

=== First upgrade ===
In 1964, the Board of Education authorized the construction of a 14 ft (4.3 m) diameter by 8 ft (2.4 m) high concrete block building, topped off with a rotating metal dome and retractable shutter to house the instrument. The footings and central piling were poured in early 1964, and the observatory became operational in 1965.

=== Formation of the Astronomy Club ===
After Robinson's retirement in 1966, students and educators decided to renovate the observatory. In 1971, a student Astronomy Club formed to use the observatory.

In the summer of 1975, the telescope mirror was improved to one-tenth wavelength by a process of re-figuring and re-aluminumizing. The Astronomy Club was later gifted a 35 mm SLR camera and began to experiment with Astrophotography. The first images produced were of the Moon and Jupiter.

=== Dedication to Hector Robinson ===
In 1975 the Lincoln Park School Board made the decision to dedicate the observatory to Robinson. The observatory's 1965 commemoration plaque was updated with a rededication for 1975. A reprint of the renaming resolution and a description of the telescope and its operation can be seen in the dedication flyer written by Ron Greenough.

=== Coultas' sponsorship ===
Between 1974-1977, the Astronomy Club was sponsored by Bruce Coultas, an 8th-grade principal at Huff Jr. High in Lincoln Park, Michigan. During this time, Club members built three more telescopes. The rich field instrument, which augmented the narrow field of view of the main 12.5-inch (320 mm) telescope, was mounted inside the observatory.

=== Mike Manyak's sponsorship and building Newtonian reflectors ===
Coultas purchased the parts to construct a 10-inch (250 mm) Newtonian F5 reflector. Optical expert and Detroit Astronomical Society member Mike Manyak, of Wyandotte, Michigan, became a sponsor and curator for the observatory. With Manyak's help, the club members were able to produce three telescopes. The club performed the most work on their own 8-inch (200 mm) Newtonian. Both the 10-inch (250 mm) and 8-inch (200 mm) Newtonian reflectors had an F5 focal length and used simple pipe mounts. The main mirrors were both grounded by the club using mirror kits. Actual final figuring of the parabolic curves was performed by Manyak, as the mirrors had a Turned Down Edge (TDE) problem.

The first and second telescopes built during the 1977 time period had fiberglass tubes, which the club fabricated and sanded, then painted powder blue. The third small telescope had a simple painted cardboard tube and was light in weight.

This third telescope had a small 4 1/4-inch (110 mm) F4 reflector. This was optically patterned after an Edmund Astroscan 2000, which was sold at the time. Manyak did the mirror's finishing and testing using a Foucault tester in Wyandotte, Michigan.

The 8-inch (200 mm) Newtonian was housed in the observatory with the main 12 1/2-inch (320 mm) telescope in 1977 when it was built. An article in the local Mellus Newspaper shows some of the club members "polishing" the mirror for the 8-inch (200 mm) Newtonian. At that time, with 35 members, the club was at record membership.

=== Decline of the Astronomy Club ===
The club was active for the years until Huff Jr. High school was torn down. The observatory and football field remained next to the old Huff School site, adjacent to Lincoln Park High school, and stayed in use until the early 1980's.

Mike Manyak was involved with astronomy until he died in 1998.

The observatory entered a dormant period after 1982, following the death of Bruce Coultas. Without a middle school club, there was little interest in the observatory. The observatory was ultimately closed prior to the renovation. Physical restoration work on the observatory began in late 2008.

=== Renovation under Dr. Timothy Dey ===
In 2001 Dr. Timothy Dey learned about the observatory and first surveyed the site. As an amateur astronomer in Lincoln Park, Dey sought out a means to bring the observatory back to use. Dey worked with Leo Macmaster, an 8th grade science teacher, to apply for funding grants to revitalize the observatory. They successfully won a grant from Toshiba in 2008.

In 2008, the observatory still housed the original telescope and the 8-inch (200 mm) Newtonian reflector, but over the years these had accumulated debris. The observatory had to be repaired and the older instruments removed. Parts of the original scaffolding used to climb up and view through the old 12-inch (300 mm) Newtonian were used as a part of a raised floor. Viewers no longer have to climb a large wooden scaffold to peer through an eyepiece 9 feet (2.7 m) off the floor.

The reflective surface of the 12-inch (300 mm) was missing aluminum finish. The 8-inch (200 mm) Newtonian had the same problems, with the acid from the bird droppings etching the previously fine surface of both mirrors. The Ford Amateur Astronomy Club (located in Dearborn Michigan) helped lead the way with their Astronomical expertise. Joseph Griggs construction company, led by Robinson's former student J. R. Griggs, helped in building restoration and construction of a new raised floor, wiring, cleanup and painting. The mayor of Lincoln Park also assisted with funding.

=== Current ===
Since 2009, the new main telescope has been operational and the old telescope has been removed. The 8-inch (200 mm) Newtonian, built in 1977, was salvaged from a scrapyard by a former member of the astronomy club.

The new main telescope mounted in the observatory is a Celestron C-14. It has computer control, go to, and tracking capability, as well as astrophotography capability. The observatory has plans for Wi-Fi access along other upgrades.

== Telescopes ==
=== Past ===
- 12.5-inch (320 mm) telescope (1964) - retired, to be put into the museum.
- 8-inch (200 mm) Newtonian reflector (1977) - removed, may be repaired, but not currently in use.

=== Current ===
- 14-inch (360 mm) Celestron Schmidt-Cassegrain telescope (2009) - installed, to be in use September 2009.
- Lunt 35mm Solar scope (a special scope to view the sun) - mounted on C-14
- 80mm F7 Meade APO Refractor - mounted on C-14

== See also ==
- List of astronomical observatories
