= John D. Dingell Park =

- Interactive map of John D. Dingell Park
- Type: City Park
- Location: Ecorse, Michigan
- Coordinates: 42°14′22″N 83°08′43″W

John D. Dingell Park is located in Ecorse, Michigan along the Detroit River. Known best for its annual Fourth of July fireworks and water festival, Dingell Park also honors local residents who gave their lives in World War II. It is named in honor of Congressman John Dingell (D-Michigan), who represented this district for decades and promoted the Downriver Linked Greenways.

== Downriver Linked Greenways ==
In 1999 Michigan Congressman John Dingell hosted the Downriver Summit, at which the Downriver Linked Greenways were created. The purpose of the Downriver Linked Greenways is to connect the communities and parks of the Downriver area through environmentally smart trails for bikers, hikers, and others who love the outdoors. In 2008 the Downriver Delta Greenway map was conceived by the Fort-Visger Community Development Corporation, a partner organization to the Downriver Linked Greenways. The Downriver Delta Greenway map links the cities of Detroit, Ecorse, River Rouge, and Lincoln Park, on the North-South Connector of the Downriver Linked Greenways. Dingell Park is one of the parks featured on this concept. Since Ecorse is a partner city, Dingell Park received funds for improvements in 2005. Renovations to the park included replacement of the boardwalk and adjoining sidewalk, a gazebo, and other landscaping work, at a cost of one million dollars.

== Life on the river ==
John D. Dingell Park is located along the Detroit River, and is a prime spot for fishing and for launching recreation boats. Lake freighters carrying ore and grain are frequently seen on the river. Mud Island, part of the Detroit River International Wildlife Refuge, is offshore of the park; it is the site for launching fireworks during the annual 4 July festival. The festival runs for 3 days, featuring local vendors and restaurants.

The Ecorse Rowing Club is located on the river and adjacent to Dingell Park. Established in 1873, seventy years before Ecorse became a city, the Rowing Club has been a staple to Dingell Park and the city for generations.
