= Lincoln Park Public Schools =

Lincoln Park Public Schools can refer to:

- Lincoln Park Public Schools (Michigan)
- Lincoln Park Public Schools (New Jersey)

== See also ==
- Lincoln Park Performing Arts Charter School, Midland, Pennsylvania
- Lincoln Park School (disambiguation)
- Lincoln Park High School (disambiguation)
