= Lincoln Park High School =

Lincoln Park High School may refer to:

- Lincoln Park High School (Chicago), Illinois
- Lincoln Park High School (Michigan)

== See also ==
- Lincoln Park Performing Arts Charter School, Midland, Pennsylvania
- Lincoln Park School (disambiguation)
- Lincoln Park Public Schools (disambiguation)
