= Archie Clark (basketball) =

American basketball player

Personal information
- Born: July 15, 1941 (age 85) Conway, Arkansas, U.S.
- Listed height: 6 ft 2 in (1.88 m)
- Listed weight: 175 lb (79 kg)

Career information
- High school: Ecorse (Ecorse, Michigan)
- College: Minnesota (1963–1966)
- NBA draft: 1966: 4th round, 37th overall pick
- Drafted by: Los Angeles Lakers
- Playing career: 1966–1976
- Position: Point guard / shooting guard
- Number: 21, 11

Career history
- 1966–1968: Los Angeles Lakers
- 1968–1971: Philadelphia 76ers
- 1971–1974: Baltimore / Capital Bullets
- 1974–1975: Seattle SuperSonics
- 1975–1976: Detroit Pistons

Career highlights
- 2× NBA All-Star (1968, 1972); All-NBA Second Team (1972); First-team All-Big Ten (1966); Third-team All-Big Ten (1965)

Career NBA statistics
- Points: 11,819 (16.3 ppg)
- Rebounds: 2,427 (3.3 rpg)
- Assists: 3,498 (4.8 apg)
- Stats at NBA.com
- Stats at Basketball Reference

Archie L. Clark (born July 15, 1941) is an American former professional basketball player. At 6 ft 2 in (1.88 m), he played guard for five National Basketball Association (NBA) teams. Clark is closely associated with pioneering the regular use of the crossover dribble move in the NBA; and has been called the father of the crossover dribble. He was a two-time NBA All-Star and was named second-team All-NBA in 1972. Clark averaged over 16 points per game during his ten-year NBA career. In 1992, he co-founded the National Basketball Retired Players Association.

Clark played college basketball for the Minnesota Golden Gophers. He was among the earliest black Big Ten basketball players, along with his teammate and close friend Lou Hudson. Clark was the Gophers first black team captain. He was selected first-team All-Big Ten as a senior in 1966, and was an honorable mention All-American.

== Early life ==
Clark was born on July 15, 1941 in Conway, Arkansas, the fourth of 12 children. He grew up in Ecorse, a suburb of Detroit, where he went to high school. He did not start playing basketball until 10th grade, and excelled in both basketball and baseball.

Upon graduating from high school, he was unable to find work during a recession, and joined the United States Army, where he served three years. Just 10 days after joining the Army, the Detroit Tigers baseball team belatedly invited him to spring training. Clark was assigned to a United States Air Force unit at Andrews Air Force Base in Maryland, where he played intramural basketball, on a team coached by Buzz Bennett. Bennett had played basketball at the University of Minnesota, and impressed by Clark's play, contacted a Minnesota assistant coach about recruiting Clark.

== College career ==
Minnesota offered the 21-year old Clark a basketball scholarship and he played three varsity seasons at point guard under head basketball coach John Kundla at Minnesota (1963 to 1966). Blacks had limited opportunities to play sports at major universities at the time, but Minnesota pioneered colorblind recruiting in the Big Ten, beginning with football coach Murray Warmath's recruiting Bobby Bell, and later Carl Eller (whom Clark would befriend at Minnesota). Kundla followed Warmath's precedent, and recruited black players like Clark and Lou Hudson. Clark played three years in the backcourt at Minnesota with future NBA All-Star guard Hudson. Clark and Hudson understood they were pioneers, and remained close until Hudson's death in 2014; Clark considering Hudson to be "'like my younger brother'".

Playing guard for the Gophers, Clark averaged 11.1 points per game as a sophomore, 14.3 points per game as a junior, and 24.5 points per game as a senior (fourth best in the Big Ten that year). He also averaged over five rebounds per game in his 72-game college career. Clark was the team's point guard, usually in the role of passing to Hudson; but Hudson was injured during the 1965–66 season, and Clark stepped up his own scoring. The team selected Clark as its captain in his senior year, the first black team captain in its history. Clark was selected first-team All-Big Ten as a senior (1966). In 1966, Clark was an Associated Press honorable mention All-American, along with Hudson; and a United Press International honorable mention All-American.

Clark also played on the Gophers' baseball team. He was a starter on the 1964 NCAA baseball championship team, and played center field the following season.

== Professional career ==
=== Los Angeles Lakers ===
After a strong collegiate career, he was drafted by the Los Angeles Lakers in the fourth round of the 1966 NBA draft, 37th overall. In his 10-season (1966 to 1976) NBA career, Clark played for the Lakers, the Philadelphia 76ers, the Baltimore/Capital Bullets, the Seattle SuperSonics, and the Detroit Pistons.

As a 25-year old Lakers' rookie, Clark averaged 23.2 minutes, 10.5 points, 2.7 assists, and 2.9 rebounds per game. In addition to Clark, the Lakers had future Hall of Fame guards Jerry West and Gail Goodrich, as well as Walt Hazzard. Clark was third in Rookie of the Year voting, behind winner Dave Bing and former Minnesota teammate Lou Hudson. In 1967–68, Clark became the Lakers' starting point guard, averaging 19.9 points per game, along with 4.4 assists and 4.2 rebounds per game. He was selected to the west All-Star team, and scored 17 points in 15 minutes of play in the 1968 All-Star Game.

=== Philadelphia 76ers ===
In 1968, Clark was part of the trade (together with Darrall Imhoff and Jerry Chambers) that brought future Hall of Fame center Wilt Chamberlain to the Lakers from the Philadelphia 76ers, who had been the NBA's Most Valuable Player in the 1967-68 season. Chamberlain and the 76ers could not reach an agreement on salary and Chamberlain's request to receive an ownership interest in the team, and the Lakers and Chamberlain were able to reach an agreement on Chamberlain's tenure and salary.

Clark started the next three seasons (1968 to 1971) for the 76ers. In his first season, he played only 26.1 minutes per game, on a team with future Hall of Fame shooting guard Hal Greer and point guard Wali Jones. However, he became the 76ers starting point guard for the 1969–70 season, and averaged 19.7 points and five assists in 37.8 minutes per game.

Clark's best season with the 76ers came in 1970–71, when he led the team in minutes played (39.6 per game) and assists (5.4 per game), while scoring 21.3 points per game; second on the team to future Hall of Fame forward Billy Cunningham. After losing in the Eastern Division playoffs the previous two seasons, the 76ers reached the Eastern Conference semifinals, but lost to the Baltimore Bullets four games to three. Clark averaged 23.6 points per game in that series, and scored a game-high 37 points in the decisive 128–120 loss in Game 7.

=== Baltimore Bullets ===
Clark was acquired along with a 1973 second-round selection (19th overall–Louie Nelson) and cash by the Baltimore Bullets from the 76ers for Kevin Loughery and Fred Carter on October 17, 1971, after playing only one game for the 76ers in the 1971–72 season. He originally refused to play for the Bullets under the terms of same contract he had with the 76ers. Clark rejoined the Bullets nine days after the trade, on October 26, while his contract was being renegotiated. Clark had a stellar year for the Bullets, leading them with a 25.1 point per game average, and eight assists per game, on a team that included future Hall of Fame shooting guard Earl Monroe. Clark was selected as an All-Star for the second time in his career, was 12th in NBA Most Valuable Player voting, and was named second-team All-NBA at guard.

==== Contract dispute and reserve clause ====
Negotiations between Clark and the Bullets went unresolved for the entire 1971–72 season. Clark believed he had an agreement while still with the 76ers to renegotiate his contract, and that he was underpaid. The Bullets only offered $135,000 per the terms of the existing contract, and Clark wanted considerably more ($375,000). Clark held out early in the 1972–73 season, and the Bullets gave Clark's attorney authority to negotiate potential trades with other NBA teams. However, the Bullets filed a lawsuit against Clark not long after that, in an effort to restrain him from negotiating with teams in the American Basketball Association, and to enforce the pre-free agency era option clause/reserve clause in Clark's contract to prevent him from signing with other teams, even though his contract had expired. A federal judge ruled against Clark in December 1972, enforcing the reserve clause and preventing him from negotiating to join other teams without the Bullets' agreement. Clark continued to hold out, and the NBA and the NBA Players' Association agreed on an arbitrator (Peter Seitz) to decide the monetary dispute. Clark and the Bullets reached a deal before that was necessary.

Clark played in only 39 games that year, averaging 18.3 points per game as the Bullets' starting point guard. The team left Baltimore at the end of the season for Landover, Maryland, becoming the Capital Bullets. Before the 1973-74 NBA season started, in August of 1973 Clark suffered a separated shoulder while he was playing basketball in Ecorse. This required surgery, and Clark only played in 56 games for the Bullets in the 1973-74 season. Clark averaged only 13.1 points per game, to go along with 5.1 assists per game. He lost the starting point guard job to Kevin Porter, who averaged 14 points and 5.8 assists per game.

=== Seattle SuperSonics and Detroit Pistons ===
Clark was dealt from the now Washington Bullets to the Seattle SuperSonics for Dick Gibbs and a 1975 third-round pick (48th overall–Tom Kropp) on August 19, 1974. He played one season in Seattle, as the starting point guard, averaging 13.9 points and 5.6 assists per game. In September of 1975, the Detroit Pistons traded their 1978 first round draft pick to Seattle for Clark. Clark finished his NBA career with the 1975–76 Pistons as a backup guard.

Over his 10-year career, Clark averaged 16.3 career points and 4.8 career assists and appeared in two National Basketball Association All-Star Games; he also received All-NBA Second Team honors in 1972. He appeared in 71 playoff games, averaging 33.6 minutes, 15.8 points, 4.2 assists, and 3.2 rebounds per game.

== Legacy (father of the crossover dribble) ==
As early as playing at the University of Minnesota, Clark was one of the first effective practitioners of the crossover dribble, which inspired his nickname "Shake and Bake". He has been called the father of the crossover move in the NBA. Former NBA player and college basketball head coach Butch Beard said the crossover dribble in the NBA began with Clark. He also has been described as the first player to routinely use the crossover dribble in the NBA. In the early 2000s, Clark observed "'In our day the referees were a lot more strict about calling a palming violation on the crossover dribble . . . Now these moves have evolved and they aren't even calling palming even though guys are carrying the ball all the time'". (One report said Clark acquired the nickname because of his unusual shooting motion.)

== NBA retired players association ==
In 1992, he co-founded the National Basketball Retired Players Association with Dave DeBusschere, Dave Bing, Dave Cowens and Oscar Robertson.

== Personal life ==
After his playing career, Clark moved back to Ecorse, and was a member of the Michigan State Housing Development Authority. Clark also worked as an executive assistant to Wayne County Executive Ed McNamara. In 1977, Clark unsuccessfully ran the mayoral campaign of Harry White to become mayor of Ecorse; but in 1979, Clark was successful as White's campaign chair for mayor. In 1987, Clark unsuccessfully ran for mayor of Ecorse, after defeating White in a primary election; losing by less than 1,200 votes in the general election.

== Career statistics ==
Legend
GP	Games played	GS	Games started	MPG	Minutes per game
FG%	Field goal percentage	3P%	3-point field goal percentage	FT%	Free throw percentage
RPG	Rebounds per game	APG	Assists per game	SPG	Steals per game
BPG	Blocks per game	PPG	Points per game	**Bold**	Career high

=== NBA ===
==== Regular season ====
Year	Team	GP	GS	MPG	FG%	FT%	RPG	APG	SPG	BPG	PPG
1966–67	L.A. Lakers	76		23.2	.452	.708	2.9	2.7			10.5
1967–68	L.A. Lakers	81		37.5	.480	.740	4.2	4.4			19.9
1968–69	Philadelphia	**82**		26.1	.478	.697	3.2	3.6			13.5
1969–70	Philadelphia	76		36.5	.496	.785	4.0	5.0			19.7
1970–71	Philadelphia	**82**	**82**	39.6	.496	.787	**4.8**	5.4			21.3
1971–72	Philadelphia	1	1	42.0	**.688**	.636	3.0	7.0			**29.0**
1971–72	Baltimore	76		**42.7**	.467	.773	3.5	**8.0**			25.1
1972–73	Baltimore	39		37.9	.507	.810	3.3	7.1			18.3
1973–74	Capital	56		31.9	.467	.786	2.5	5.1	1.1	**.1**	13.1
1974–75	Seattle	77		32.2	.495	.834	3.1	5.6	**1.4**	**.1**	13.9
1975–76	Detroit	79		20.1	.433	**.862**	1.7	2.8	.8	**.1**	7.6
Career		725	83	32.5	.480	.769	3.3	4.8	1.1	.1	16.3
All-Star		2	0	18.0	.538	1.000	.5	4.5			12.5

==== Playoffs ====
Year	Team	GP	MPG	FG%	FT%	RPG	APG	SPG	BPG	PPG
1967	L.A. Lakers	3	41.7	.516	.765	**4.3**	5.0			25.7
1968	L.A. Lakers	**15**	35.2	.427	.768	3.1	4.0			15.3
1969	Philadelphia	5	37.0	**.519**	.895	3.8	4.4			19.4
1970	Philadelphia	5	29.2	.433	.727	2.8	3.6			13.6
1971	Philadelphia	7	42.1	.475	.733	4.1	4.9			23.6
1972	Baltimore	6	**45.2**	.437	.847	4.0	**7.8**			**26.7**
1973	Baltimore	5	42.8	.500	.778	3.4	5.2			21.2
1974	Capital	7	23.1	.339	.550	1.9	2.0	**.7**	.0	7.3
1975	Seattle	9	29.9	.436	**.900**	3.6	3.4	**.7**	**.1**	11.1
1976	Detroit	9	21.3	.484	.667	2.3	3.2	**.7**	.0	8.0
Career		71	33.6	.454	.772	3.2	4.2	.7	.0	15.8
