= Battle of Bloody Run =

Battle of Pontiac's War (1763)

Coordinates: 42.34203°N 83.0143°W

- Part of Pontiac's War
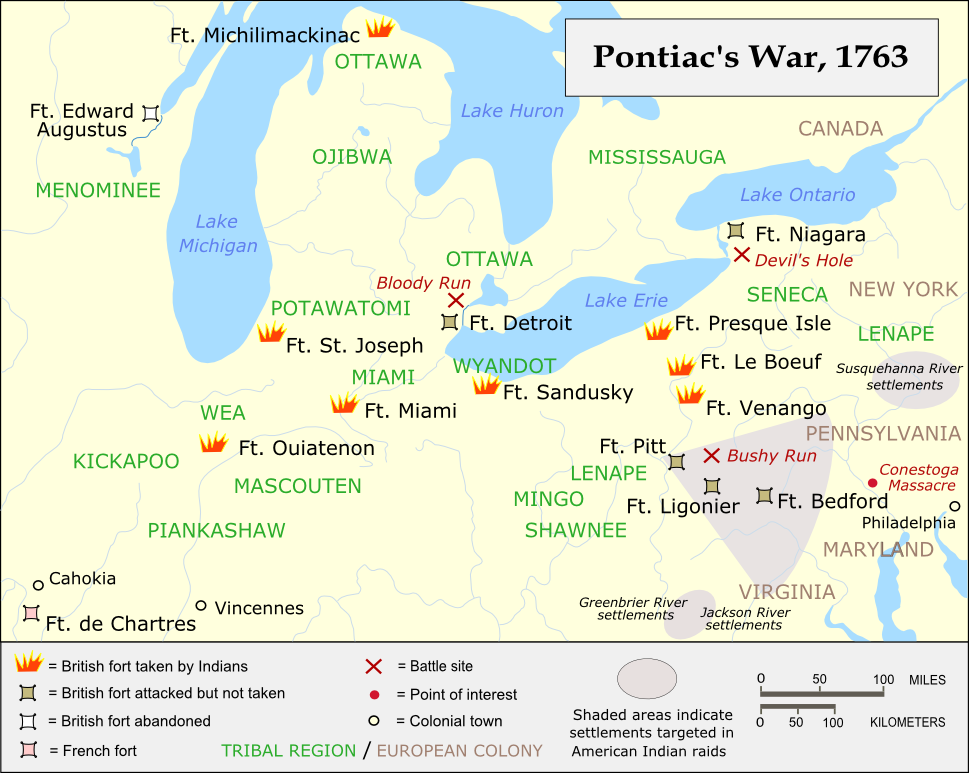
- Pontiac's war
Date	July 31, 1763
Location	Parent's Creek hence Bloody Run, near Fort Detroit, New France (now in Detroit, Michigan)
Result	American Indian victory

Belligerents
Pontiac's confederacy	Kingdom of Great Britain

Commanders and leaders
Pontiac	Captain James Dalyell †; Major Robert Rogers

Strength
~300	250

Casualties and losses
~5-6 killed ~11 wounded	35th Regt: 15 kia/29 wia; 60th Regt: 1 kia/7 wia; 80th Regt: 2 kia/3 wia; Rogers' Rangers: 2 kia/1 wia; Trader's servant: 1 wia; Total: ~20 killed 41 wounded

The Battle of Bloody Run was fought during Pontiac's War on July 31, 1763, near what now is the site of Elmwood Cemetery in the Eastside Historic Cemetery District of Detroit, Michigan. In an attempt to break Pontiac's siege of Fort Detroit, about 250 British troops attempted to make a surprise attack on Pontiac's encampment.

Pontiac was ready and waiting, possibly alerted by French settlers, and defeated the British at Parent's Creek 2 miles (3.2 km) east of the fort. However, he did not accomplish the destruction of this British force which would have greatly demoralized the British and dissuaded more British efforts to break the Indian siege of Fort Detroit. The creek, or run, was said to have run red with the blood of the 20 dead and 41 wounded British forces and was henceforth known as Bloody Run. The British forces retreated with all their wounded and all but seven of those killed. The attack's commander, Captain James Dalyell, was one of those killed. After learning of Dalyell's death, General Jeffery Amherst offered a £200 bounty to anyone who would kill Pontiac.

The famous frontiersman Robert Rogers was one of the British commanders in this battle.

== See also ==
- List of battles won by Indigenous peoples of the Americas
- Council Point Park
