= Ecorse River =

River in Michigan, United States

Ecorse River Rivière aux Écorces
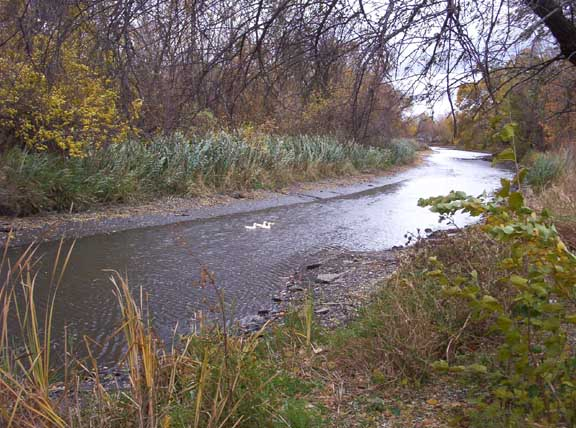
- The north branch at Council Point Park

- Location within the state of Michigan

Physical characteristics
- Mouth
  - location: Detroit River
  - coordinates: 42°14′06″N 83°08′50″W
- Length: 18.8 miles (30.3 km)
- Discharge
  - location: mouth
  - average: 41.7 cu ft/s (1.18 m^{3}/s) (estimate)

The Ecorse River is a 18.8-mile-long (30.3 km) river in southern Michigan. Because of its small size, it is often identified as Ecorse Creek. It flows through the Downriver section of Metro Detroit, and is a tributary of the Detroit River. The early French settlers named it the Rivière aux Écorces ("bark river"). They named the river after the custom they observed of the local Native American tribe, who wrapped their dead in birch or elm bark, and buried them at the mouth of the river. The river has two branches, which meet at Council Point Park in the city of Lincoln Park, where chief Pontiac held a council in 1763 before attacking Fort Detroit.

== Description ==
The river system consists of a 4.5-mile-long (7.2 km) South Branch (10.7 miles (17.2 km) when including the Sexton-Kilfoil Drain) and a 18.2-mile-long (29.3 km) North Branch, which combine and run another 0.6 miles (0.97 km) to the Detroit River. Elevations run from 670 feet (200 m) above sea level in the northwest corner of the watershed to 575 feet (175 m) at the Detroit River. Over a year, it has a mean flow of 3.2 cubic feet (0.091 m^{3}) per second. The Ecorse River has a watershed of 43.4 square miles (112 km^{2}). The north branch drains 18.75 square miles (48.6 km^{2}) and has tributaries designated the Trouton Drain, Freeman Drain, Black Creek, and the Douglas and Kelly Drain. The south branch has a drainage area of 12 square miles (31 km^{2}), and tributaries include the Grams Drain in Southgate and the Brighton, Bondie, and the Sloss and Ganong Drains in Taylor. The rest of the watershed is drained by enclosed underground drains, the largest of which is the La Blanc Drain which enters the north branch about 500 feet (150 m) north of the junction of the north and south branches. The La Blanc Drain drains 12 square miles (31 km^{2}).

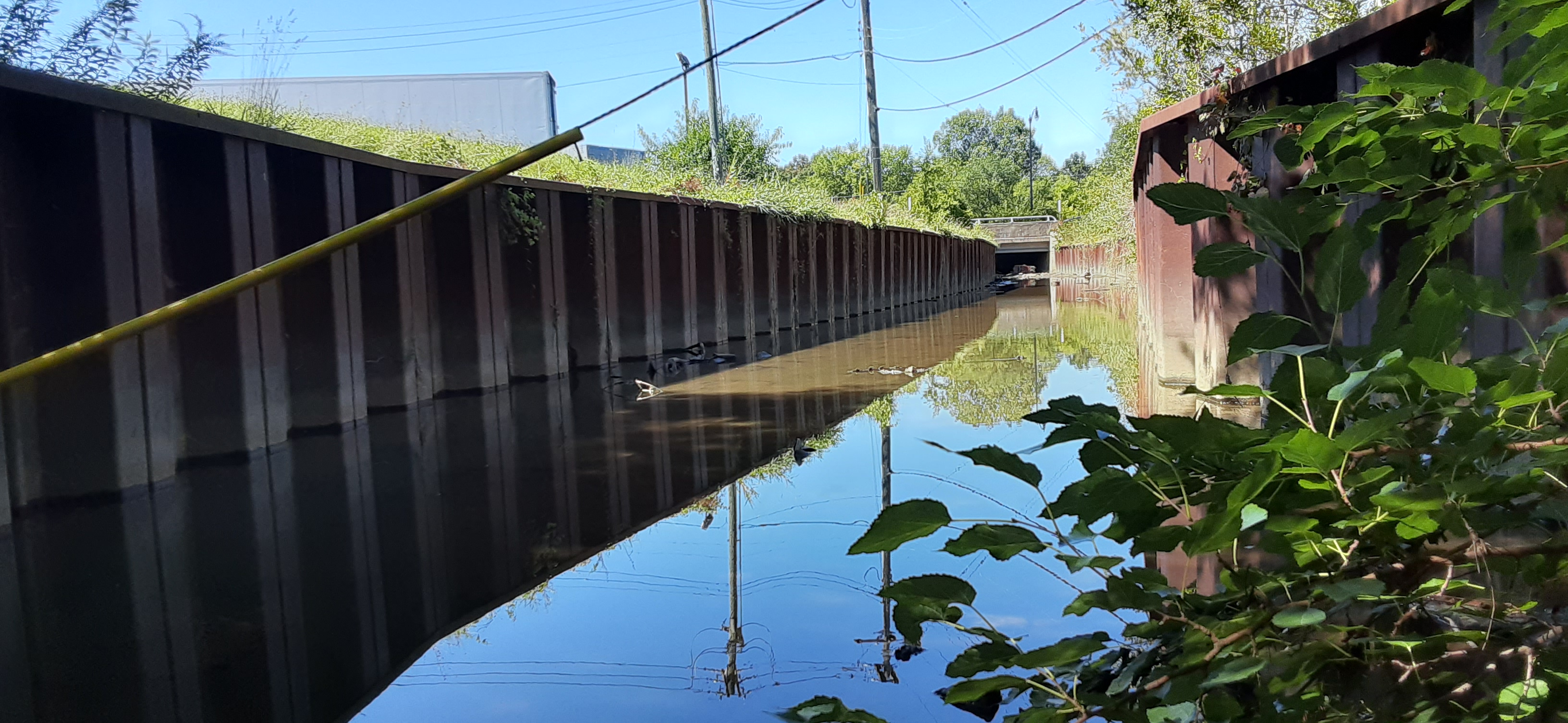
The Sexton and Kilfoil Drain in Taylor, Michigan

The north branch flows through Romulus, Dearborn Heights, Allen Park, along a small portion of the southern border of Melvindale, Lincoln Park and then along the border of Lincoln Park and Ecorse. The south branch flows through Romulus, Taylor, Allen Park and Lincoln Park. It is joined by the Sexton and Kilfoil Drain in Taylor. After the two branches join in Lincoln Park, the river flows along the boundary between Ecorse and Wyandotte to its mouth on the Detroit River. A marina occupies both banks of the river at its mouth.

The river has a very low gradient and is subject to heavy silting which worsens the seasonal flooding. Much of the watershed contains clay soil 20 to 65 feet (6.1 to 19.8 m) deep which limits ground absorption, and 85% of the land in the entire watershed is developed as residential or commercial/industrial which decreases the available land surface for absorption. Homes near the river are required to carry flood insurance, and damaging flooding is a common occurrence. A storm on May 21, 2004, that produced 4 inches (100 mm) of rain resulted in the river rising over 6 feet (1.8 m) in only three hours.

The Ecorse River flows into the Detroit River about midway along that river's course. The next river north of the Ecorse is the Rouge River, while the next river south is the Huron River.

The watershed is heavily developed, with a population density of 3,711 people per square mile in 2000. It is also heavily industrialized with both light and heavy industry. Contamination is a problem, both from ongoing industrial and residential sources and as a legacy of the steel works along its lower length.

== Flood control ==
It was reported in September 2008 that the Wayne County Department of Environment will begin the first phase of a $239 million project to protect the nine municipalities along the north branch of the creek from flash flooding. The first phase, to begin in early 2009, is to cost $7 to $10 million and will be funded by special assessments on the 48,000 properties in the watershed. It will consist of changes to the 80 paths that cross the creek, as well as constructing new drains and basins.

== Note ==
Some sources designate the North and South branches as Ecorse Creek and the only short combined stream as Ecorse River.

As of April 14, 2009, a high amount of E. coli bacteria from human waste was found to be in the creek water. Officials were urging citizens to stay out and away from the water.

== See also ==
- List of rivers of Michigan
