= Lincoln Park School =

Lincoln Park School may refer to:

- Lincoln Park School (Greenfield, Indiana)
- Lincoln Park School (Pinebluff, North Carolina)

== See also ==
- Lincoln Park Performing Arts Charter School, Midland, Pennsylvania
- Lincoln Park High School (disambiguation)
- Lincoln Park Public Schools (disambiguation)
