= Lincoln Park Post Office =

- U.S. National Register of Historic Places
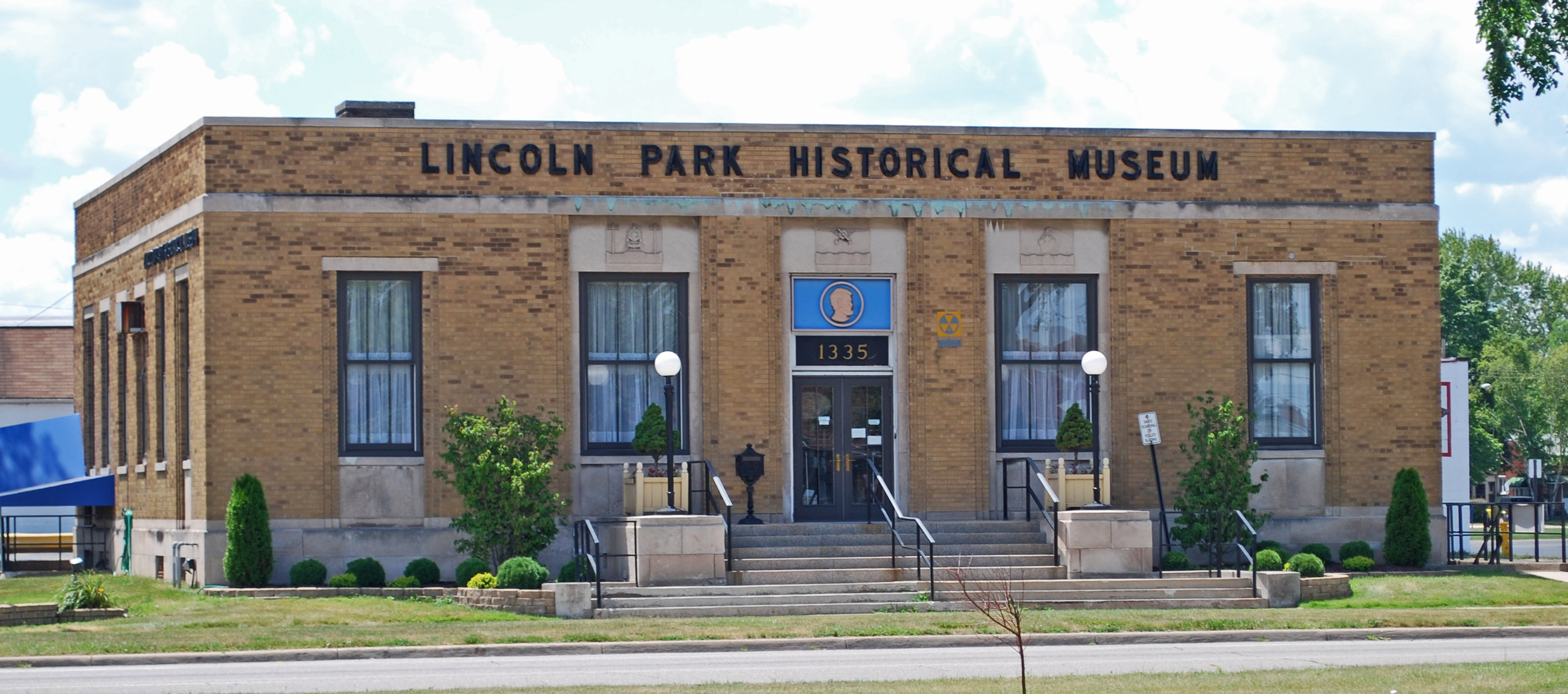

- Location within Michigan Location within the United States
- Interactive map showing the location of the Lincoln Park Post Office
- Location: 1335 Southfield Rd., Lincoln Park, Michigan
- Coordinates: 42°15′1″N 83°10′44″W
- Area: less than one acre
- Built: 1938
- Built by: Henry Dattner
- Architect: Louis A. Simon
- Architectural style: Classical Revival
- NRHP reference No.: 03001551
- Added to NRHP: February 4, 2004

The former Lincoln Park Post Office is a building located in Lincoln Park, Michigan. It now houses the Lincoln Park Historical Museum. It was listed on the National Register of Historic Places in 2004.

== History ==
In the late 1930s, the city of Lincoln Park had a need for a new post office building. Congressional approval was obtained in 1938, and the land where this building stands was obtained for $15,000. The design of this building, created by supervising architect of the treasury Louis A. Simon, was used for a number of other post offices in the state of Michigan. The building was constructed by the Henry Dattner Co., who began construction in December 1938. The final cost of construction was $80,000. The Lincoln Park Post Office was dedicated on August 5, 1939, serving as a branch of the Detroit Post Office. Lincoln Park Post Office began operating as an independent post office in 1954.

However, the Postal Service's Lincoln Park operations eventually outgrew the size of the building. The Post Office left the building in 1991. The Lincoln Park Historical Society purchased the building, renovated it, and opened it to the public. The building is now the home of the Lincoln Park Historical Museum.

== Description ==
The former Lincoln Park Post Office is a one-story, flat-roofed building built of concrete and steel and faced with tan brick. St sits on a raised basement faced with limestone; limestone is also used for the parapet cap and a stringcourse below. he main facade is symmetrical, with a center entrance and two windows on each side. The outer windows are atop limestone panels. The inner window openings are broader and higher, rising to the stringcourse beneath the parapet, with the windows vertically centered between limestone panels. The front entrance is reached by a flight of stairs, and stone carvings on a panel over the entryway represent three modes of mail transportation: air, rail, and ship.

The simpler side elevations have six windows apiece. One side has a basement access stairs. The rear loading dock area has been renovated with vinyl siding.

The interior one-and-one-half-story main floor contains a lobby, Postmater's office, and mail workroom. The public lobby measures approximately 45 feet by 13 feet, and has a terrazzo floor with marble wainscoting. The lobby originally housed a mural, Hauling in the Nets, by Zoltan Sepeshy. The mural is now located in the Marine Museum on Beaver Island. The postmaster's office measures approximately 12 feet by 14 feet, and the mail workroom approximately 40 feet by 59 feet. The basement contains three storage rooms.

== See also ==
- List of United States post offices
