= Council Point Park =

- Location within Michigan
- Interactive map of Council Point Park
- Location: 3213 River Drive; Lincoln Park, Michigan
- Coordinates: 42°14′08″N 83°09′43″W
- Area: 27 acres (10.9 ha)
- Administrator: City of Lincoln Park

Council Point Park is a city-owned park in Wayne County in the U.S. state of Michigan. It is located along the Ecorse River within the city of Lincoln Park. The park is 27 acres, and borders the cities of Wyandotte and Ecorse. The point itself is formed by the northern and southern branches of the Ecorse River, just before it reaches the Detroit River. The land for the park was purchased in the late 1980s. The park's dimensions were courtesy of Wade Trim and Associates. The park includes a 1.9 mile jogging track along the Ecorse River, two baseball/softball diamonds, two soccer fields, a picnic pavilion, a children's park with a playscape, an inline hockey arena, and a permanent restroom/storage building.

== History ==
Council Point Park is the site of a significant event in the history of the state of Michigan. In 1763, Chief Pontiac, the chief of the Ottawa tribe in Michigan, called for a council along the Ecorse River of all of the tribes in what is now Michigan. The tribes that were present at this council were the Wyandot, Detroit Ottawa, and the Potawatomi. Pontiac called these tribes to action, stating that not only did he and other Natives want the British gone, but that it was a special task sent from the King of France to attack and remove the British from the former French territories. Pontiac's plan was to attack Fort Detroit in 3 days. After a few abortive attempts to take the fort by trickery, Pontiac and his people laid siege to the fort, and kept it besieged for six months.

A series of small farm fields and woods was purchased from the Levy Company by the City of Lincoln Park in the late 1980s to become Council Point Park. The city partnered with the Michigan Department of Natural Resources in order to clean up a small toxic waste spill. Hazardous chemicals, including heavy metals used in steel making, had spilled into the park and needed to be cleaned up before the park was opened. The Department of Natural Resources cleaned up the land to make it a safe park.

The 1915 Musta family farmhouse, located at 3051 River Drive (at Mayflower) along the western edge of the park, still remains.

An Army Corps of Engineers water access was modified and rebuilt in WWII and is still buried beneath the property and is also documented in the Washington CoE register.

== Activities ==
Council Point Park is host to a variety of activities. The park has two baseball diamonds in which little league practices and games are held. The park has two youth soccer fields used during the summer. There is a 1.9 mile walking/jogging track that outlines the perimeter of the park. One of the park's new attractions is an inline hockey rink in which inline summer roller hockey leagues are played. Local inline hockey players can also skate year round. The park also includes a picnic pavilion in which many families and organizations host picnics and parties.

The Lincoln Park Relay for Life is held at Council Point, every year on Mother's Day weekend.

== Entertainment ==
Council Point Park is used for a Pow Wow by the American Indian Movement of Michigan, to commemorate Pontiac's great meeting back in the 1760s. The Pow Wow offers the opportunity for children and adults both to learn about the happenings of the Council of Pontiac, and the rich cultural heritage of the original inhabitants of this area, along with dancing, fun games and other activities. Council Point Park also has several different venues for visitors of the park to sit down and watch sporting events including baseball, softball, soccer, and inline hockey.

== Geography ==
Council Point Park is a 27-acre park on the eastern edge of the City of Lincoln Park. The park is bordered by the Northern and Southern branches of the Ecorse Creek to the east, and River Drive to the west. The Creek forms the borders between the City of Lincoln Park, Wyandotte on the southern end, and Ecorse on the north end.
