= National Basketball Retired Players Association =

Non-profit association

- Abbreviation: NBRPA
- Formation: 1992
- Founder: Dave DeBusschere, Dave Bing, Dave Cowens, Oscar Robertson and Archie Clark
- Founded at: New York City
- Type: Charitable 501 (c)3 non-profit organization
- Headquarters: Chicago, Illinois
- Leader: Antonio Davis

The National Basketball Retired Players Association (NBRPA) is a non-profit association composed of former professional basketball players of the NBA, ABA, Harlem Globetrotters, and WNBA. It was founded in 1992 by NBA Hall of Famers Dave DeBusschere, Dave Bing, Dave Cowens, Oscar Robertson and former NBA point guard Archie Clark. Also referred to as the Legends of Basketball, the NBRPA serves as the official alumni organization for the NBA, ABA, Harlem Globetrotters, and WNBA. The NBRPA was founded in New York City and is currently headquartered in Chicago, Illinois, while also having chapters located throughout the United States in Atlanta, Dallas, Detroit, Houston, Las Vegas, Los Angeles, Miami, New York, Orlando, and Phoenix.

== Overview ==
The National Basketball Retired Players Association is a charitable 501(c)(3) non-profit organization that is supported by the NBA and National Basketball Players Association (NBPA). The NBRPA seeks to assist former NBA, WNBA, ABA and Harlem Globetrotters players with their transition away from their careers as professional athletes. Additionally, the NBRPA works to positively impact communities and youth through basketball and mentorship. In 2012, the Retired Players Association moved its headquarters to Chicago after 20 years in New York City.

== Leadership ==
=== Board of directors ===
The NBRPA is governed by a board of directors consisting exclusively of former professional basketball players that are elected by their peers

=== Executive ===
Antonio Davis is the current President & CEO of the National Basketball Retired Players Association.

=== Ambassador & Spokesperson ===
In August 2014, the National Basketball Retired Players Association named Jalen Rose as their official Ambassador and Spokesperson. Within this role, Rose will shape programs for former players while recruiting and enlisting the help of younger NBA players.

== Membership ==
The NBRPA's membership consists of over 1,000 former professional basketball players, featuring 70 NBA Hall of Famers and 41 of the NBA's 50 Greatest Players. Members include Michael Jordan, Julius Erving and Magic Johnson.

== WNBA Inclusion ==
On August 6, 2013, the NBRPA announced its inaugural class of former WNBA players as NBRPA members after a historic vote by its board of directors. The NBRPA announced Cynthia Cooper-Dyke, Nikki McCray, Carla McGhee, Dawn Staley, Sheryl Swoopes, Penny Toler, and Teresa Weatherspoon as the inaugural class of former WNBA players as NBRPA Members.

== Legends Care ==
Legends Care is an initiative of the NBRPA that positively impacts communities and youth through basketball. NBRPA Legends give back through clinics, mentoring, charitable outreach and other grassroots initiatives in the United States and abroad with the goal of educating, inspiring and keeping youth active, healthy and safe.

=== Community/Youth Initiatives ===
- Legends HBCU Scholarship - The Legends HBCU Scholarship is a scholarship fund and scholars program for undergraduates attending HBCUs. Legends Scholars will receive a $10,000 scholarship in recognition of their academic excellence and desire to positively impact the world.
- Full Court Press: Prep for Success - Full Court Press: Prep for Success is a one-day youth basketball and mentoring clinic for underserved boys and girls, ages eight to 18, held in cities across the United States and abroad. The program is led by the NBRPA with direct support from the NBA and housed under the Jr. NBA and NBA Cares brand. Full Court Press is designed to introduce participating youth to positive role models in both basketball and life, with equal time spent on the basketball court, in the classroom and at a mentoring roundtable as part of a robust and meaningful curriculum.
- BACK2BACK - BACK2BACK prepares elementary students for the upcoming school year by providing them with brand new backpacks filled with essential back to school supplies.
- Legends Girl Chat - Legends Girl Chat is a virtual Legends Care program consisting of one-hour video conversations between high school girls and WNBA Legends. Partnering with the NBRPA on Legends Girl Chat is Girls Inc. Through this Legends Care partnership, all 78 affiliates of Girls Inc. are able to schedule a Legends Girl Chat to incorporate into their programming.
- Legends Home Courts - Through the Legends Home Courts program, monetary grants are given to community groups for the renovation of outdoor basketball courts.
- Thanksgiving Community Assist - The Thanksgiving Community Assist is an annual Legends Care program through which families in need receive a Thanksgiving turkey and holiday cheer from the Legends of Basketball.

=== International Goodwill Missions ===
As part of the NBRPA's global mission to give back, a group of Legends and NBRPA staff embark on annual goodwill missions to international destinations, such as Haiti, Panama, South Africa, and China, using basketball as a vehicle to impact children.

== Dave DeBusschere Scholarship Program ==
Created in 2009, the NBRPA's Dave DeBusschere Scholarship provides member Legends, their spouses and/or children with academic scholarships for higher education purposes. The NBRPA has awarded more than $1.5 million to over 500 recipients at 465 colleges/universities through the Dave DeBusschere Scholarship Program and continues to grow with each new year.
