= Lincoln Park Public Schools (Michigan) =

School district in Michigan

Address
- 1650 Champaign Road Lincoln Park, Wayne, Michigan, 48146; United States

District information
- Grades: Pre-Kindergarten-12
- Established: 1925
- Superintendent: Terry Dangerfield
- Schools: 11
- Budget: $106,136,000 2022-2023 expenditures
- NCES District ID: 2621600

Students and staff
- Students: 4,895 (2024-2025)
- Teachers: 343.2 FTE (2024-2025)
- Staff: 904.23 FTE (2024-2025)
- Student–teacher ratio: 14.26 (2024-2025)

Other information
- Website: www.lincolnparkpublicschools.com

Lincoln Park Public Schools is a public school district in Metro Detroit. It serves Lincoln Park in Wayne County.

== History ==
As of 1912, Ecorse Township, within which Lincoln Park was established, had twelve school districts. When Lincoln Park became a city in 1925, the school districts within the city boundaries merged and became the present school district.

The current Lincoln Park High School was built in 1960. At the time, the building had 2,900 students.

On June 19, 1961, two men (including the district's chief engineer) were killed in a boiler explosion at the high school.

== Schools ==
Schools in Lincoln Park Public Schools
| School | Address | Notes |
|---|---|---|
| Lincoln Park High School | 1701 Champaign, Lincoln Park | Grades 9-12 |
| Lincoln Park Middle School | 2800 Lafayette, Lincoln Park | Grades 6-8 |
| Beacon School | 12501 Telegraph, Southgate | A day treatment program for students with special needs in grades K-12. |
| Carr Elementary School | 3901 Ferris, Lincoln Park | Grades K-5 |
| Crowley Center | 2000 Pagel Ave., Lincoln Park | Preschool |
| Foote Elementary School | 3250 Abbott, Lincoln Park | Grades K-5 |
| Hoover Elementary School | 3750 Hoover, Lincoln Park | Grades K-5 |
| Keppen Elementary School | 661 Mill, Lincoln Park | Grades K-5 |
| Lafayette Elementary School | 1360 Lafayette, Lincoln Park | Grades K-5 |
| Mixter Institute for Transition | 3301 Electric, Lincoln Park | Post-secondary program for adults with autism. Serves 17 districts in the Downriver area. |
| Paun Elementary School | 2821 Bailey, Lincoln Park | Grades K-5 |
| Raupp Elementary School | 1351 Ethel, Lincoln Park | Grades K-5 |

=== Defunct Schools ===
- Crowley Elementary School - Last used as the Crowley Center.
- Goodell Grade School - This school building was extant from 1918 until 1976 when it was razed. The original one-room wooden school house on the site served students of District 11 of Ecorse Township.
- Hamilton Elementary School
- Horger Elementary School - This school has been razed.
- Huff Middle School (formerly Lincoln Park High School #1) - Razed and replaced by Lincoln Park Middle School.
- Lafayette Elementary School #1 - Razed and replaced by Lafayette Elementary School #2.
- LeBlanc Elementary School - Last used for special education purposes, now home to Blessed Hope Christian Church
- Mixter Elementary School - Now houses the Mixter Institute or Transition (and thrift store). Students 18–26 with Autism Spectrum Disorder.
- Raupp Elementary School #1 - Razed and replaced with Raupp Elementary School #2
- Smith Elementary School - Now houses administrative offices for the school district.
- Strowig Grade School - This school was razed in 1926 with the widening of Fort Street. The original one-room wooden school house on the site served students of District 5 of Ecorse Township.
