= Ecorse Public Schools =

School district in Michigan, United States

Address
- 27225 W. Outer Drive Ecorse, Wayne County, Michigan, 48229; United States

District information
- Grades: Pre-Kindergarten - 12
- Superintendent: Josha Talison
- Schools: 6
- Budget: $27,461,000 2022-2023 expenditures
- NCES District ID: 2612930

Students and staff
- Students: 1,150 (2024-2025)
- Teachers: 57.0 (on an FTE basis) (2024-2025)
- Staff: 136.01 FTE (2024-2025)
- Student–teacher ratio: 20.18 (2024-2025)

Other information
- Website: www.ecorse.education

Ecorse Public Schools is a public school district in Metro Detroit, United States. It serves most of Ecorse.

== History ==
Ecorse had a school by the 1860s. It is recorded that in 1871, a frame school was near the Detroit River. It was replaced in 1912 with an eight-room building (later called Ecorse School One) that contained a high school that went to grade ten. Added to the Ecorse school system were:

- School Two in 1916, on Josephine Street
- School Three in 1923, on Sixth Street near Southfield
- A new high school in 1927, on Seventh Street near Outer Drive. Grades eleven and twelve were then added to the district.

These schools are pictured in the 1952 high school yearbook, along with Miller School, built in 1938 and named for Claude J. Miller, a long-serving principal and superintendent in the district.

In the 1990s, schools One, Two, and Three were torn down. A new high school opened in 2001. Grandport Elementary was built on the site of School Three.

== Schools ==
Schools in Ecorse Public Schools district
School	Address	Notes
Ecorse Community High School	27385 W. Outer Dr., Ecorse	Grades 9-12
Grandport Academy	4536 6th St, Ecorse	Grades 5-8. Hosts Project Excel magnet program
Ralph J. Bunche School	503 Hyacinthe St., Ecorse	Grades 1-4.
Vincent J. Parks Alternative Education Center	27225 W. Outer Dr., Ecorse	Alternative high school on Ecorse Community High School campus. Grades 9-12.
Brenda Hague Early Learning Village	50 W. Josephine, Ecorse	Grades PreK-K
