= Amy Jack =

American country music singer

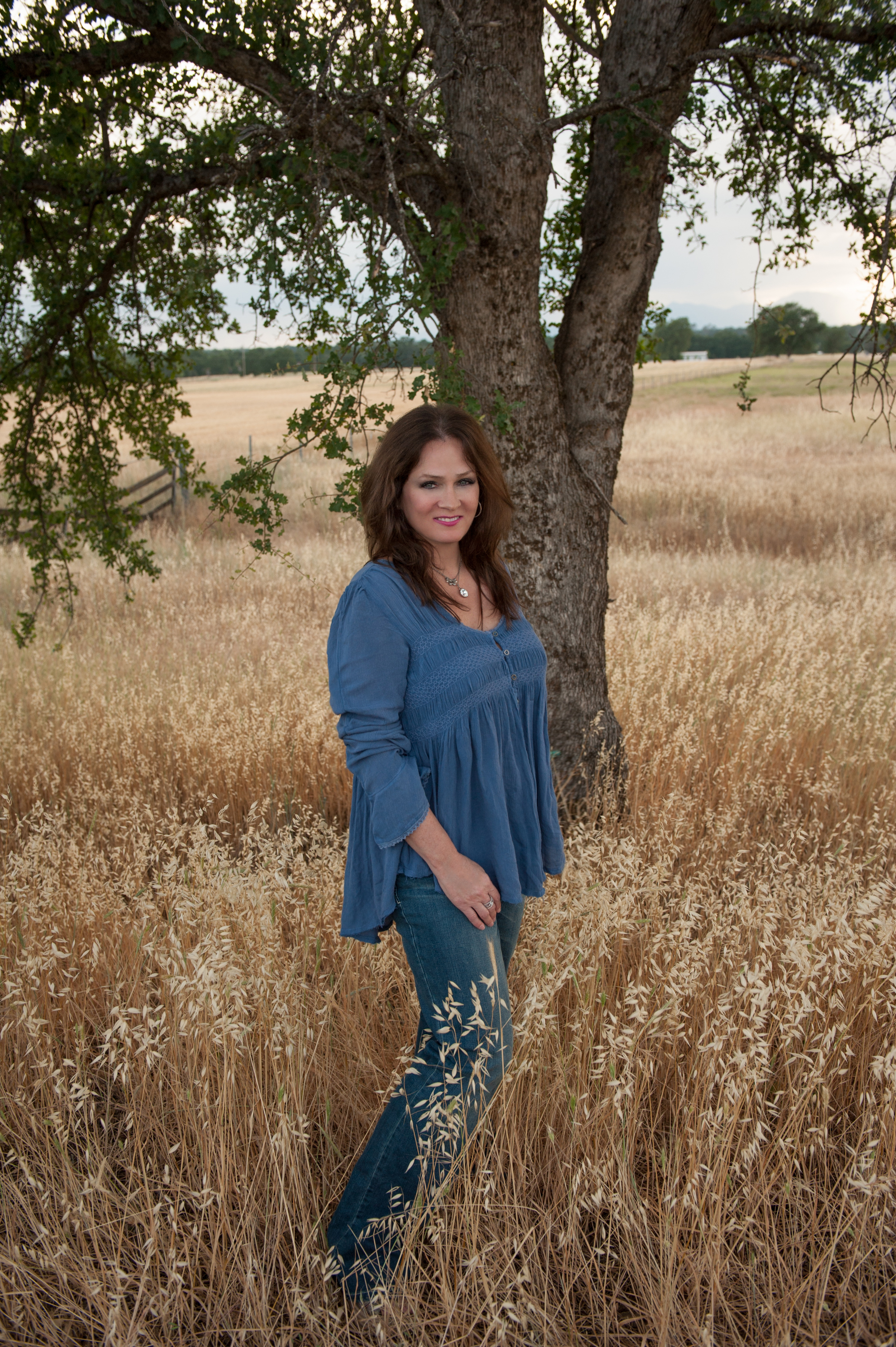

Background information
- Born: May 10; Sulpher, Oklahoma, U.S.
- Genres: Country
- Instrument: Vocals
- Labels: Entertainment One
- Website: https://www.amyjackmusic.com/

Amy Jack is an American country music singer.

== Early years ==
A native of Oklahoma, Jack was raised by a family of music teachers. Jack graduated from the University of Oklahoma with a B.A. in TV/Radio/Film and currently lives in the Dallas-Fort Worth.

== Career ==
Amy Jack's initial career in the music industry led her to become an account executive for iHeart Media and Cumulus.

Jack's song, “For The Love of the Game” was featured on the 2016 U.S. Olympic Committee's ‘Road to Rio’ Tour, in addition to a featurette for Kobe Bryant on FOX Sports and the ESPN Network during March Madness the same year. Her song, “Shake And Bake” was featured in a Fox Sports segment for Baker Mayfield. Additionally, “Born To Lead,” was featured as the soundtrack to the NCAA's Lombardi Awards.

On January 17, 2020 Jack released her debut album Introducing Amy Jack, produced by Merle Haggard. Featuring a cover of Haggard's “Got Lonely Too Early,” Jack co-wrote ten of the tracks with a team including Dewayne Hitchings and Don Goodman. Jack's latest releases include "Hi Hi You're a Buckeye" and "A Rising Tide Lifts All Boats."

== Albums ==
Introducing Amy Jack
No.	Title	Writer(s)	Length
1.	"Big Boy Up"	Rosey Fitchpatrick, Amy Jack, Anthony Cunningham	3:14
2.	"Got Lonely Too Early"	Merle Haggard	2:56
3.	"Got A Life To Catch"	Amy Jack, Rosey Fitchpatrick, Anthony Cunningham	2:55
4.	"Jack Of All Trades"	Amy Jack, Duane Hitchings, Don Goodman	2:39
5.	"My Favorite Memory"	Merle Haggard	3:18
6.	"Swagger"	Amy Jack, Don Goodman, Duane Hitchings	2:35
7.	"Walkin' Around Money"	Amy Jack, Don Goodman, Duane Hitchings	2:33
8.	"Game Day"	Amy Jack, Anthony Dini, Billy Christopher Dawson, Edward Galen	2:54
9.	"Game On"	Amy Jack, Ace Otten & Eddie Galan	2:47
10.	"If Not For Friends"	Amy Jack, Don Goodman, Duane Hitchings, Joanna Jack John	2:38
11.	"It's Up To You Baby"	Amy Jack, Eddie Galan	2:09
12.	"Lay Me Down In Oklahoma"	Kris Bergsnes, Tony Ramey, Si Hill	3:06
13.	"Shake and Bake"	Amy Jack, Edward Galen, John Otten	3:03
