= Pontiac (Odawa leader) =

18th-century Native American war chief

Chief Pontiac
- Obwaandi'eyaag
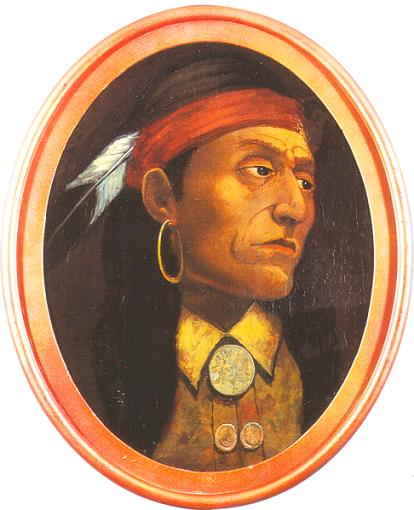
- No authentic visual depictions of Pontiac are known to exist. This interpretation was painted by John Mix Stanley.
- Born: c. 1714/20; Great Lakes region
- Died: April 20, 1769 (aged 48–55) near Cahokia, Illinois Country
- Cause of death: Assassination
- Occupations: Regional speaker, Chieftain
- Known for: Pontiac's War

Pontiac or Obwaandi'eyaag (c. 1714/20 – April 20, 1769) was an Odawa war chief known for his role in the war named for him, from 1763 to 1766 leading Native Americans in an armed struggle against the British in the Great Lakes region due to, among other reasons, dissatisfaction with British policies. It followed the British victory in the French and Indian War, the North American front of the Seven Years' War. Pontiac's importance in the war that bears his name has been debated. Historical accounts from the 19th century portrayed him as the mastermind and leader of the revolt, but some subsequent scholars argued that his role had been exaggerated. Historians today generally view him as an important local leader who influenced a wider movement that he did not command.

The war began in May 1763 when Pontiac and 300 followers attempted to take Fort Detroit by surprise. His plan foiled, Pontiac laid siege to the fort, where he was eventually joined by more than 900 warriors from a half-dozen tribes. Meanwhile, messengers spread the word of Pontiac's actions, and the war expanded far beyond Detroit. In July 1763, Pontiac defeated a British detachment at the Battle of Bloody Run, but he was unable to capture the fort. In October, he lifted the siege and withdrew to the Illinois Country. Pontiac's actions contributed to the British Crown's issuance of the Proclamation of 1763, which prohibited new settlements west of the Appalachian Mountains to preserve the area for Native Americans.

Pontiac's influence declined around Detroit because of the siege but he gained stature as he continued to encourage the various tribal leaders to fight against the British. Seeking to end the war, British officials made him the focus of their diplomatic efforts. In July 1766, he made peace with British Superintendent of Indian Affairs Sir William Johnson. The British attention to Pontiac aroused resentment among other tribal leaders, as the war effort was decentralized while Pontiac claimed greater authority than he possessed. He was increasingly ostracized and in 1769 he was assassinated by a Peoria warrior. The modern day cities of Pontiac, Michigan, Illinois, and Quebec were named in his honor; as well as the famous automobile Pontiac vehicles.

== Early years ==
A depiction of Pontiac by American illustrator F. O. C. Darley.

Contemporaneous documents reveal little about Pontiac before 1763. He was probably born between 1712 and 1725, perhaps at an Odawa village on the Detroit or Maumee River. Other sources state that he may have been born in Defiance, Ohio. A park at the confluence of the Maumee and Auglaise rivers in Defiance is named Pontiac Park and identified as his birthplace. Along with the name Pontiac, he was also known as Obwandiyag.

Historians are uncertain about the tribal affiliation of his parents. According to an 18th-century Odawa tradition, Pontiac's mother was a Chippewa and his father an Odawa, although some sources claim that one of his parents was a Miami. Some sources also state that he may have been born a Catawba and taken as prisoner, then adopted as Odawa. Pontiac was always identified as Odawa by people who knew him. Since 1723 he had also lived in close proximity to Fort Detroit (which he later besieged). His only known wife was Kan-tuck-ee-gon (the Woman Canoe Paddler) with whom he fathered three children: two sons named Tisson and Negig and a daughter named Marie Manon. Marie is described as a Salteuse or Saulteaux Indian and she is buried in Assumption Cemetery in Windsor, Ontario.

By 1747, Pontiac had become a war leader among the Odawa, when he allied with New France against a resistance movement led by Nicholas Orontony, a Huron leader. Nicolas had also allowed the English to build a trading post, Fort Sandusky, in 1745 near Sandusky Bay in Ohio country. Pontiac continued to support the French during the French and Indian War (1754–1763) against British colonists and their allied Native Americans. He may have taken part in the famous French and Indian victory over the Braddock expedition on July 9, 1755, although there is no direct evidence.

In one of the earliest accounts of Pontiac, Robert Rogers, a noted British frontier soldier, claimed to have met with the warrior chief in 1760, although many details in Rogers' story are unreliable. Rogers wrote a play about Pontiac called Ponteach: or the Savages of America (1765), which helped to make the Odawa leader famous and began the process of mythologizing about him. According to historian Richard White, the play made Pontiac "the most famous Indian of the eighteenth century".

== Pontiac's War ==
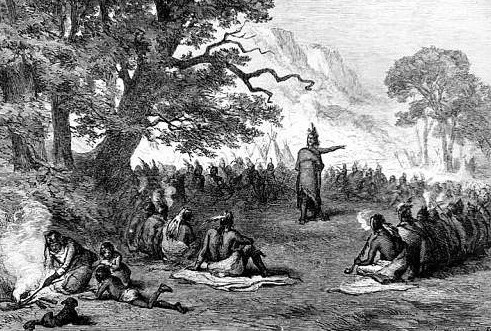
In a council on April 27, 1763, Pontiac (standing in center of gathering) urged followers to rise up against the British. 19th century engraving by Alfred Bobbett.

The French and Indian War, the North American theater of the Seven Years' War, effectively ended in 1760 with the British conquest of Quebec, which marked the defeat of New France. Indian allies of the defeated French soon became dissatisfied with the trading practices of the victorious British. In addition, although by treaty the British said they would not build any forts in Ohio Country, General Jeffery Amherst, the architect of British Indian policy, ordered one built on the south shore of Sandusky Bay in 1761. It was known as Fort Sandusky. Amherst also changed policies toward Native Americans, cutting back on the practice of gifts, which the French had customarily given to the First Nations, but he considered to be bribes. He also restricted the distribution of gunpowder and ammunition, supplies that the First Nations needed for hunting and that had previously been traded to them by the French. Some of them believed that the British intended to subjugate or destroy them.

Following the war, British colonists started entering areas formerly colonized by the French. By 1761, tribal leaders began calling for First Nations to join, drive the British out of the region, and revive the French and First Nations alliance. The French government recognized that the region of the Great Lakes was now in British control. Pontiac's desire to see the French return was so great that he refused to believe that the French would not return, believing it to be a ploy by the British. Contributing to the anti-British sentiment was a religious revival inspired by a Lenape prophet named Neolin, who called for First Nations to reject European cultural influences and return to traditional ways. Pontiac may have been involved in a 1762 conference on the Detroit River in which leaders had apparently issued a call to arms to various Indian tribes. According to historian John Sugden, Pontiac "probably thought himself part of a resistance movement already under way".

On April 27, 1763, Pontiac held a large council about 10 miles below Fort Detroit (present-day Council Point Park in Lincoln Park, Michigan). Pontiac urged the listeners to join him in a surprise attack on Fort Detroit. On May 1, Pontiac visited the fort with 50 Odawa in order to assess the strength of the garrison.

According to a French chronicler, Pontiac proclaimed in a second council:

It is important for us, my brothers, that we exterminate from our lands this nation which seeks only to destroy us. You see as well as I that we can no longer supply our needs, as we have done from our brothers, the French.... Therefore, my brothers, we must all swear their destruction and wait no longer. Nothing prevents us; they are few in numbers, and we can accomplish it. The French are all subdued, But who are in their Stead become our Lords? A proud, imperious, churlish, haughty Band. The French familiarized themselves with us, Studied our Tongue, and Manners, wore our Dress, Married our Daughters, and our Sons their Maids, Dealt honestly, and well supplied our Wants, Used no one ill, and treated with Respect Our Kings, our Captains, and our aged Men; Call’d us their Friends, nay, what is more, their Children. And seem’d like Fathers anxious for our Welfare

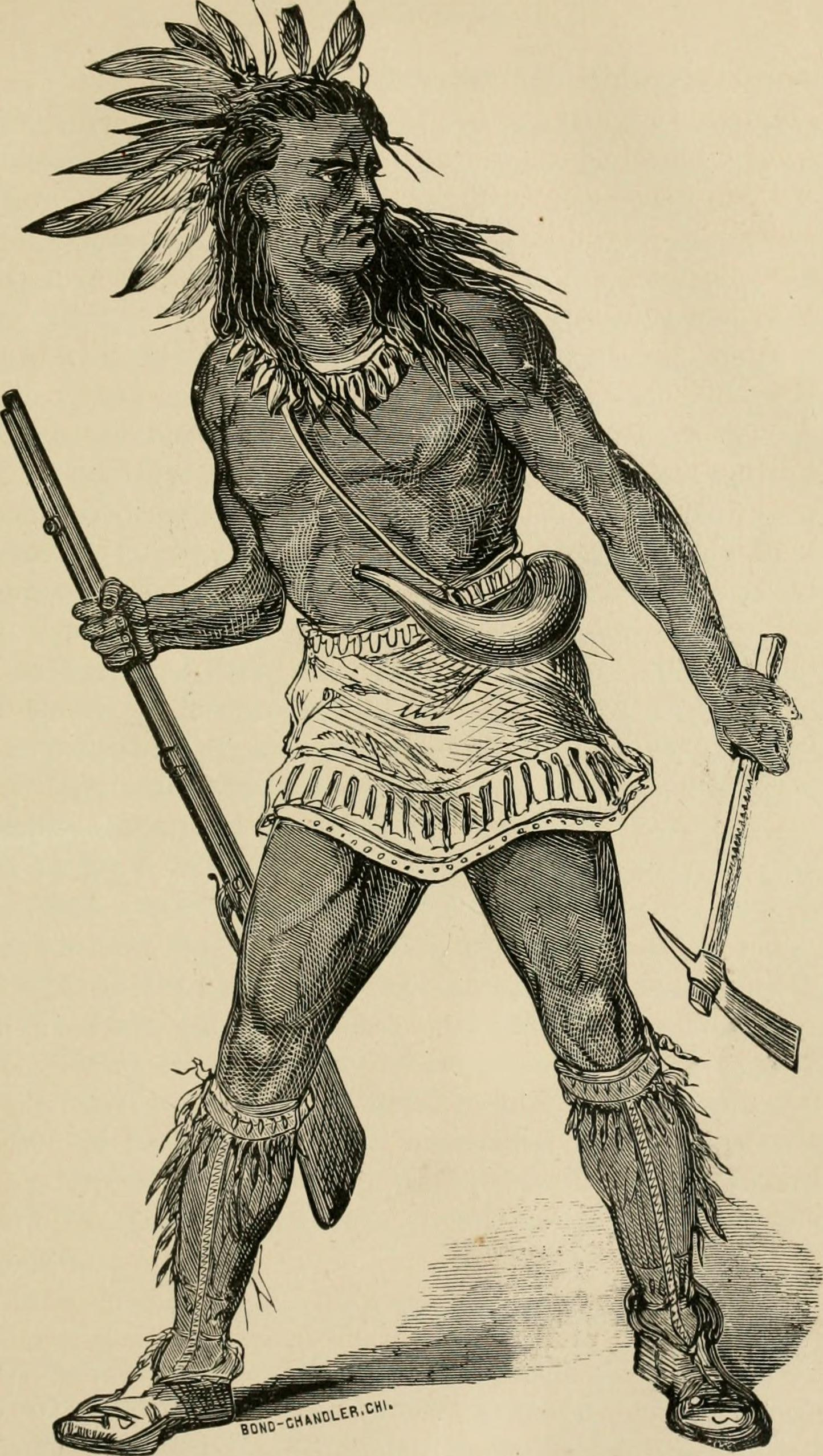
Pontiac, as depicted in an 1879 history of Illinois

Pontiac's War began on May 7, 1763, when Pontiac and 300 followers attempted to take Fort Detroit by surprise. His plan was foiled because Major Henry Gladwin, the fort's commander, had been warned by an informer and had prepared his defense. Pontiac withdrew and looked for other opportunities to capture the fort, to no avail. On May 9, he laid siege to the fort, and was eventually joined by more than 900 warriors from a half-dozen tribes. While Pontiac was besieging Fort Detroit, messengers spread word of his actions. Indians made widespread attacks against British forts and Anglo-American (but not French) settlements, and at one point controlled nine of eleven British forts in the Ohio Valley. They destroyed Fort Sandusky. In July 1763, Pontiac defeated a British detachment at the Battle of Bloody Run, but he was unable to capture the fort. In October, he lifted the siege and withdrew to the Illinois Country, where he had relatives.

Pontiac continued to encourage militant resistance to British occupation among the Illinois and Wabash tribes, and to recruit French colonists as allies. According to historian Richard White, it was during this time that Pontiac exerted his greatest influence, developing from a local war leader into an important regional spokesman. After the failure of the siege of Fort Detroit, the British initially thought that Pontiac was defeated and would trouble them no longer, but his influence continued to grow. The British had successfully pacified the uprising in the Ohio Country, but British military dominance was tenuous. They decided to negotiate with the Odawa leader. The British further increased his stature by making Pontiac the focus of their diplomacy and not understanding the decentralized Indian approach to war. Pontiac met with Sir William Johnson, the British Superintendent of Indian Affairs, on July 25, 1766, at Fort Ontario in Oswego, New York, and formally ended hostilities when he signed a peace treaty stopping the rebellions.

To prevent a similar uprising, the British increased their frontier presence in the years following Pontiac's War. In this way, the rebellion's result was the opposite of Pontiac's original intentions. Perhaps most importantly, these were the final major Indian rebellions against British control in the Ohio Country before the creation of the United States guaranteed a permanent white presence in the North American interior.

== Final years ==
Pontiac's final years are sparsely documented. He was summoned to Detroit in August 1767 to testify in the investigation of the murder of Elizabeth "Betty" Fisher, a seven-year-old English colonist. In 1763 during the siege of Detroit, an Odawa war party had attacked the Fisher farm, killing Betty's parents and taking the girl captive. The following year, while Betty was still captive at Pontiac's village, she tried to warm herself at Pontiac's fire. The girl was sick with dysentery, and Pontiac became angry when she soiled some of his clothes. According to court testimony, Pontiac picked up the naked child, threw her into the Maumee River, and called upon a French-speaking ally to wade into the river and drown her. This was done. The French colonist who drowned Fisher was later arrested by the British, but he had escaped by the time that Pontiac came to testify. Pontiac neither confirmed nor denied his role in the murder, and the investigation was eventually dropped.

The attention paid to Pontiac by the British Crown encouraged him to assert more power among the Indians of the region than he possessed by traditional rights. "By 1766 he was acting arrogantly and imperiously," wrote historian Richard White, "assuming powers no western Indian leader possessed." In 1768, he was forced to leave his Odawa village on the Maumee River and relocate near Ouiatenon on the Wabash River. On May 10, 1768, he dictated a letter to British officials in which he explained that he was no longer recognized as a chief by the people of his village on the Maumee.

=== Death ===
Pontiac was assassinated on April 20, 1769, near the French town of Cahokia. Most accounts place his murder in Cahokia, but historian Gregory Dowd wrote that the killing probably happened in a nearby Indian village. The killer was a Peoria warrior whose name has not been preserved. He was apparently avenging his uncle, a Peoria chief named Makachinga (Black Dog), whom Pontiac had stabbed and badly wounded in 1766. A Peoria band council had authorized Pontiac's execution. The Peoria warrior came behind Pontiac, stunned him by clubbing him, and stabbed him to death.

Various rumors quickly spread about the circumstances of Pontiac's death, including one that the British had hired his killer. Benjamin Drake, writing in 1848, records that the Michigamie, along with the other bands in the Illinois Confederation, had been attacked by a general confederation of the Sauk, Fox, Kickapoo, Sioux, Chippewa, Odawa, and Potawatomi, along with the Cherokee and Choctawa from the south. The war continued for a great many years until the Illinois Confederation was destroyed. Drake records that by 1826, only about 500 members of the Confederation remained. Lieutenant Pike, in his travels to the sources of the Mississippi, remarked, "By killing the celebrated Sauk chief, Pontiac, the Illinois, Cahokias, Kaskaskias, and Peorias kindled a war with the allied nations of the Sauks and Reynards, which has been the cause of the almost entire destruction of the former nations." According to a story recorded by historian Francis Parkman in The Conspiracy of Pontiac (1851), a terrible war of retaliation against the Peoria resulted from Pontiac's murder. This legend is still sometimes repeated, but there is no evidence that there were any Indian reprisals for Pontiac's murder. Pontiac's burial place is unknown, and may have been at Cahokia. But evidence and tradition suggest that his body was taken across the river and buried in St. Louis, recently founded by French colonists from New Orleans and the Illinois Country. In 1900, the Daughters of the American Revolution placed a commemorative plaque at the southeast corner of Walnut and South Broadway in St. Louis, which was said to be near Pontiac's burial place.

== Legacy and honors ==
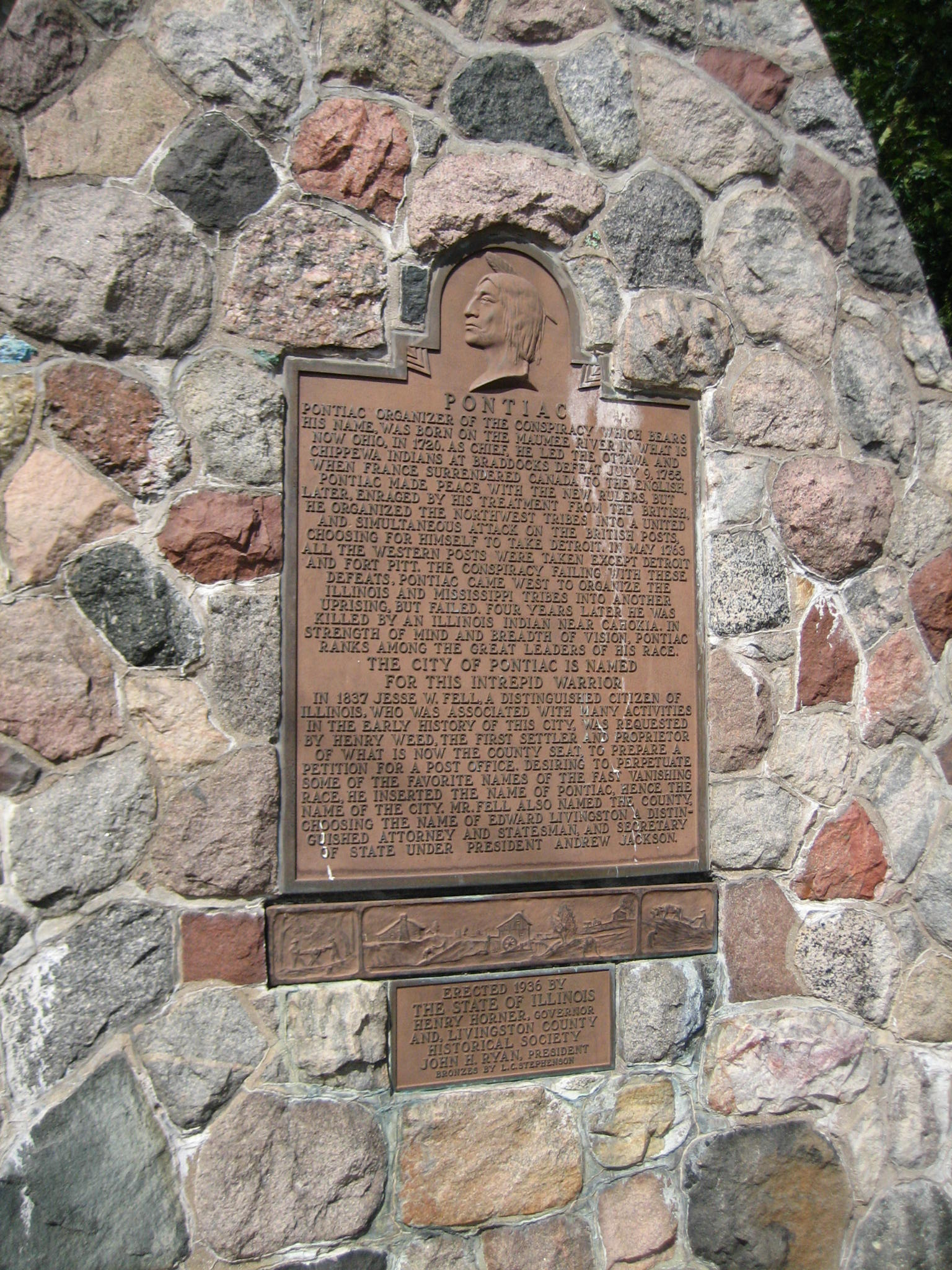
Pontiac Memorial at Livingston County Courthouse in Pontiac, Illinois

The image of Pontiac was used in the first logo of the American car brand Pontiac, released by General Motors

Historians have differed in their assessments of Pontiac's importance. Older accounts of the war portrayed him as a ruthless but brilliant mastermind behind a massive "conspiracy" which was planned in advance. For example, Norman Barton Wood dubbed him the "Red Napoleon". Historians today generally agree that Pontiac's actions at Detroit were the spark that instigated the widespread uprising, and that he helped to spread the resistance by sending emissaries urging other leaders to join it, but he did not command the various tribal war leaders as a whole. They operated in a highly decentralized way.

In addition, tribal leaders around Fort Pitt and Fort Niagara, for example, had long been calling for a declaration of war against the British; they were not led by Pontiac. According to historian John Sugden, Pontiac "was neither the originator nor the strategist of the rebellion, but he kindled it by daring to act, and his early successes, ambition, and determination won him a temporary prominence not enjoyed by any of the other Indian leaders". The British assumed that chiefs were able to hold more authority than they usually did, and failed to recognize the decentralized nature of the Indian bands and tribes.

Places named for Pontiac include the cities of Pontiac in Michigan and Illinois in the United States; Pontiac, Quebec, in Canada; and the Pontiac Regional County Municipality in Quebec. Pontiac was also the name of a popular automobile brand of General Motors, developed and originally based in Detroit, which was discontinued in 2010. A Belgian watch company was also named after him, reportedly because he was able to tell the time by the stars. Various streets and buildings throughout the US are named after Pontiac.
