= Crossover dribble =

Basketball technique

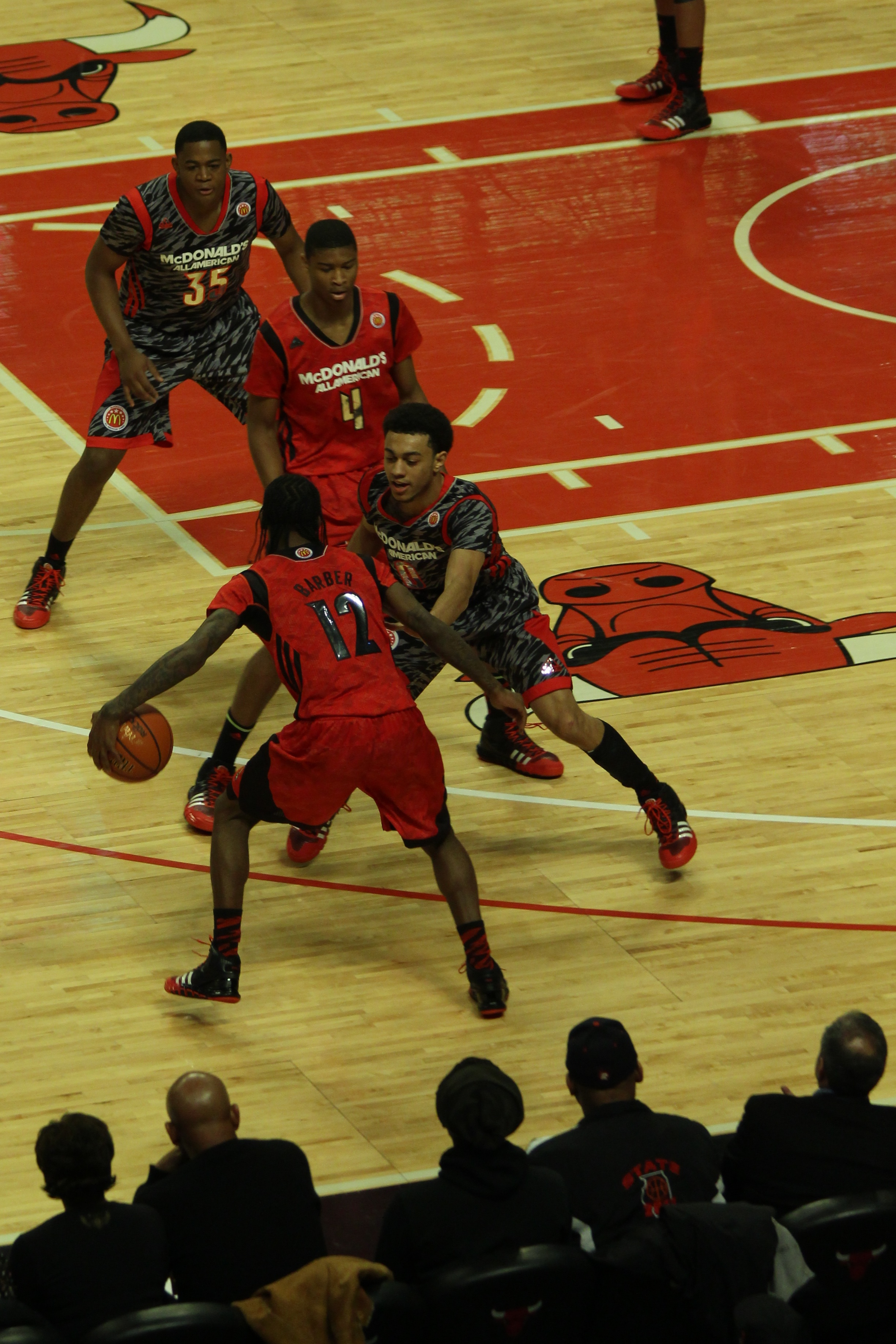
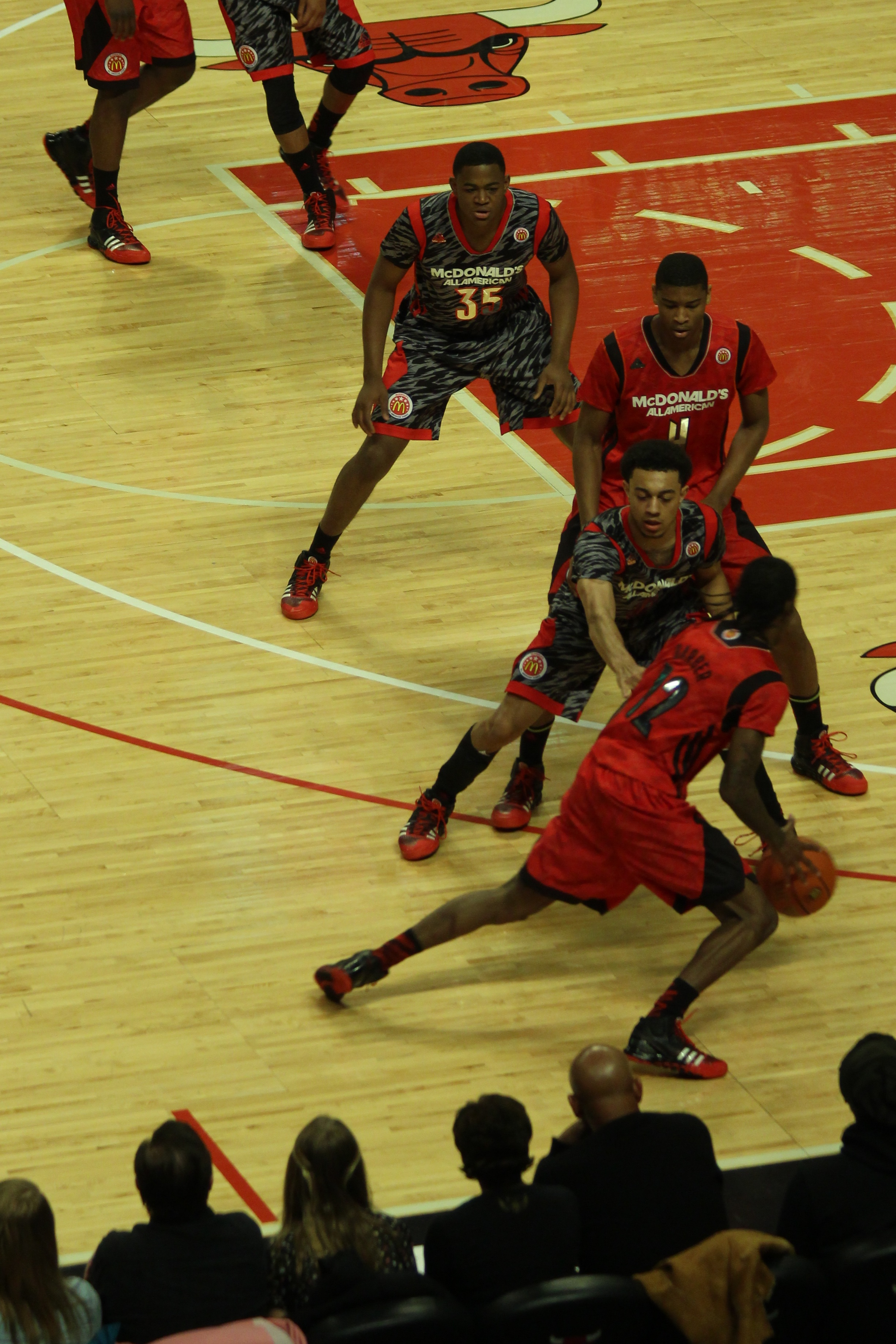
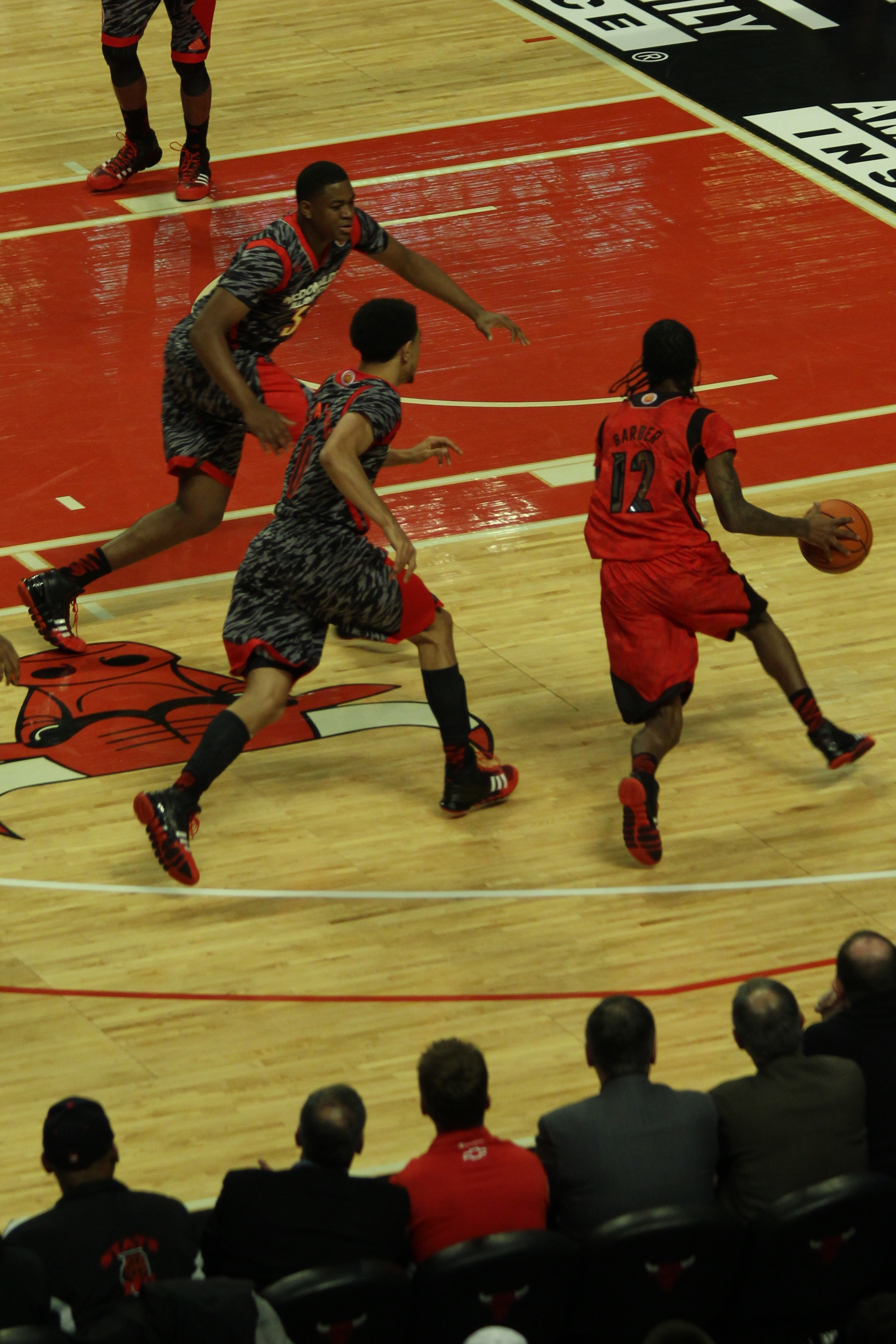
Cat Barber does a crossover dribble on Nigel Williams-Goss at the 2013 McDonald's All-American Boys Game

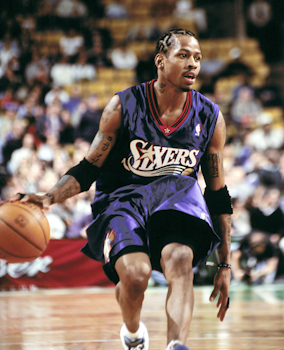
Allen Iverson was known for his signature move, the crossover.

A crossover dribble is a basketball maneuver in which a player dribbling the ball switches the ball rapidly from one hand to the other, to make a change in direction. In a typical example the player heads up-court, dribbling the ball in (say) the left hand, then makes a wide step left with a head fake. If the defender is deceived, and expects the attacker to drive left, the attacker can then switch to dribbling with the right hand, and drive right, blowing past the defender. The crossover can allow the player an open jump shot or a clear path to the basket. The crossover is generally performed for space creation.

The first crossover, it is claimed, happened in a street basketball game at the Rucker Park by the street legend Richard (Rick) "Pee Wee" Kirkland.

In the NBA, Oscar Robertson was known to do the move as early as the 1960s as well as Dwayne Washington while playing for Syracuse during the early 1980s. Former NBA player Archie Clark, who played for five teams from 1966–1976, has been called the father of the crossover move in the NBA; and was given the nickname "Shake-and-Bake" for his dribbling style. Tim Hardaway is credited for popularizing the killer crossover in the NBA, as well as Allen Iverson and Steve Francis.
