= Ecorse, Michigan =

- City
- City of Ecorse
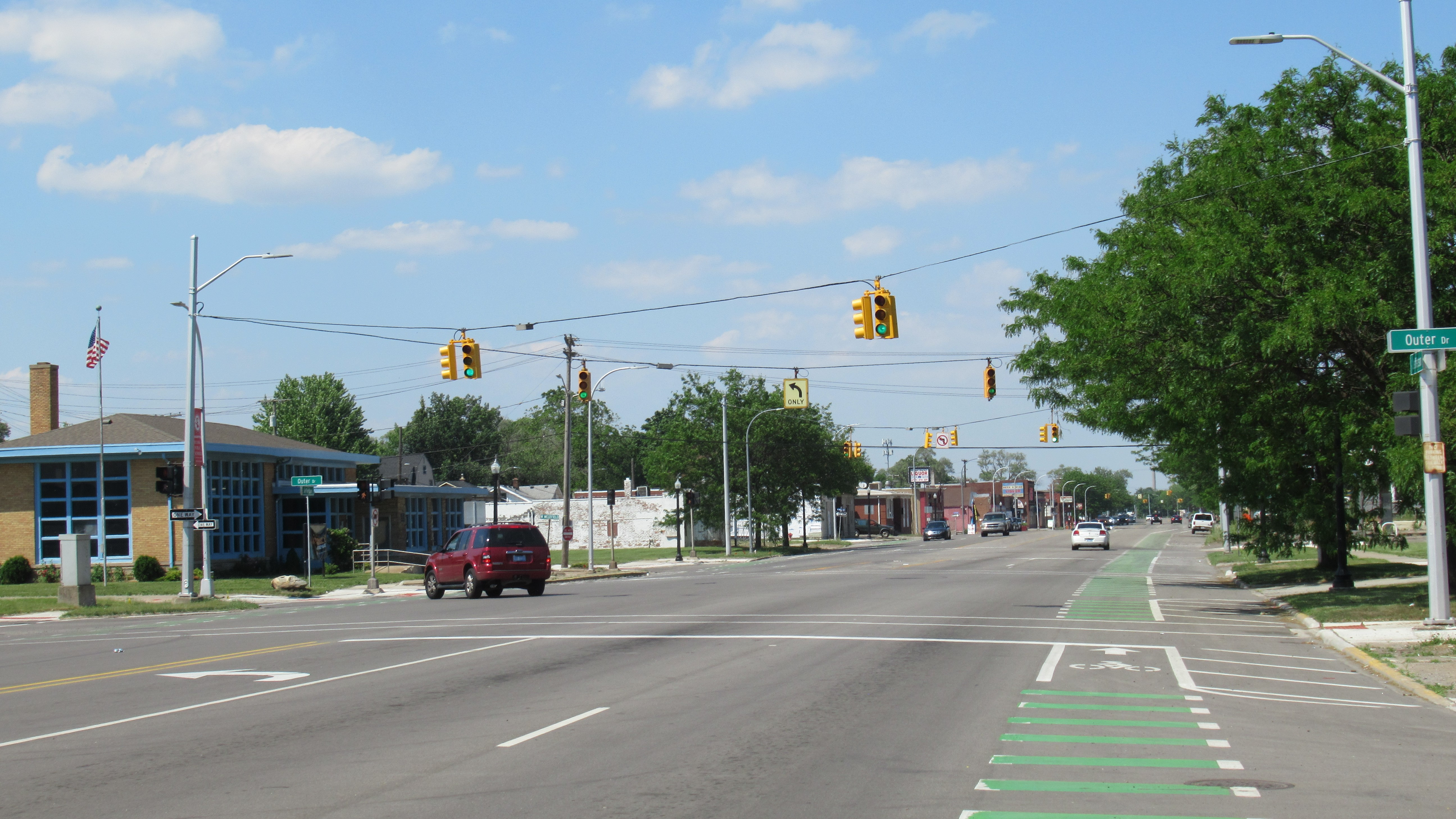
- Intersection of Outer Drive and Jefferson Avenue

- Seal

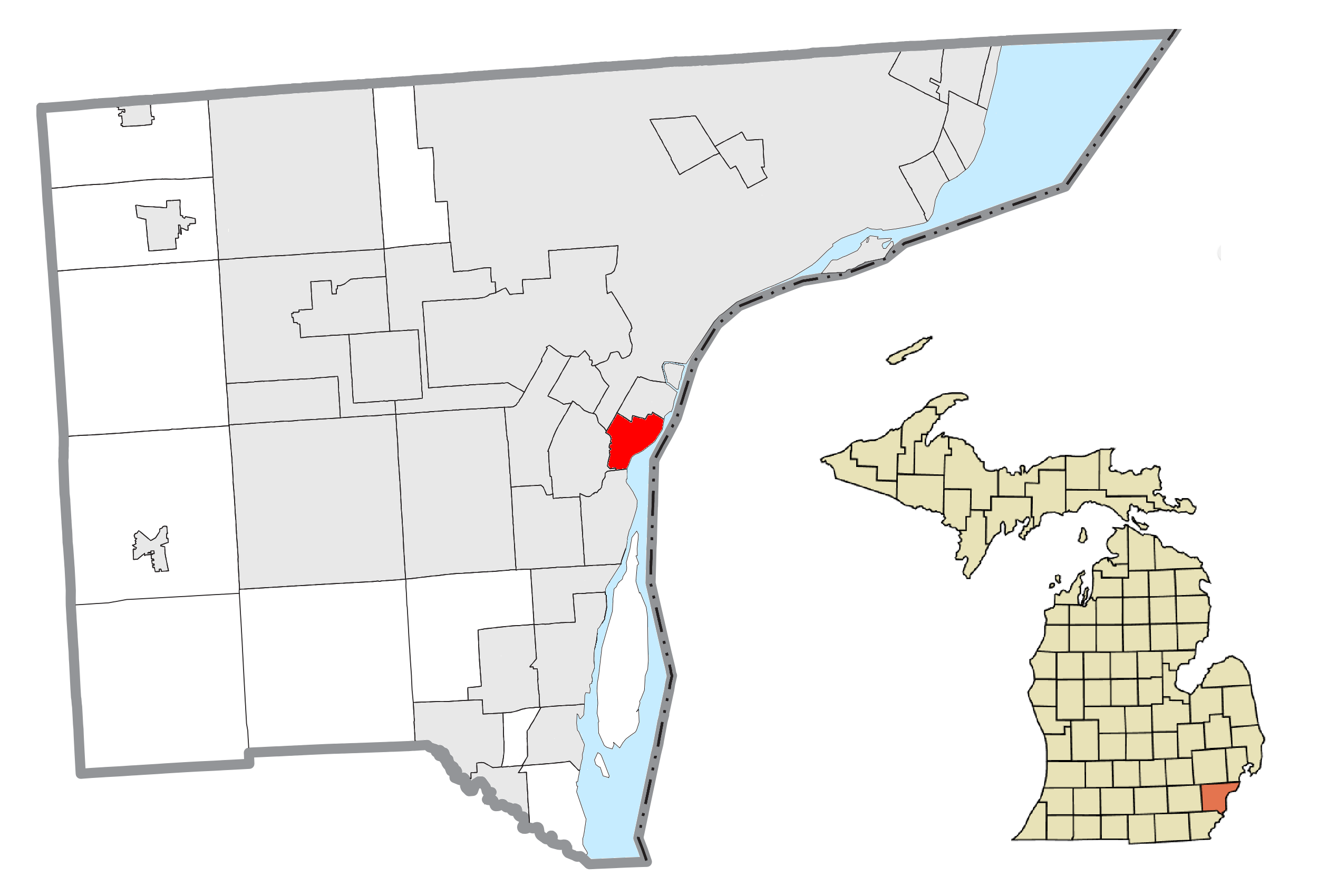
- Location within Wayne County

- Location within the State of Michigan Location within the United States
- Coordinates: 42°15′02″N 83°08′54″W
- Country: United States
- State: Michigan
- County: Wayne
- Incorporated: 1903 (village); 1942 (city)

Government
  - Type: Mayor–council
  - Mayor: Lamar Tidwell
  - Clerk: Dana Hughes

Area
  - City: 3.71 sq mi (9.62 km^{2})
  - Land: 2.84 sq mi (7.35 km^{2})
  - Water: 0.88 sq mi (2.27 km^{2})
- Elevation: 581 ft (177 m)

Population (2020)
  - City: 9,305
  - Density: 3,279.8/sq mi (1,266.35/km^{2})
  - Metro: 4,285,832 (Metro Detroit)
- Time zone: UTC-5 (EST)
  - Summer (DST): UTC-4 (EDT)
- ZIP code(s): 48218 (River Rouge); 48229
- Area code: 313
- FIPS code: 26-24740
- GNIS feature ID: 0625337
- Website: www.ecorsemi.gov

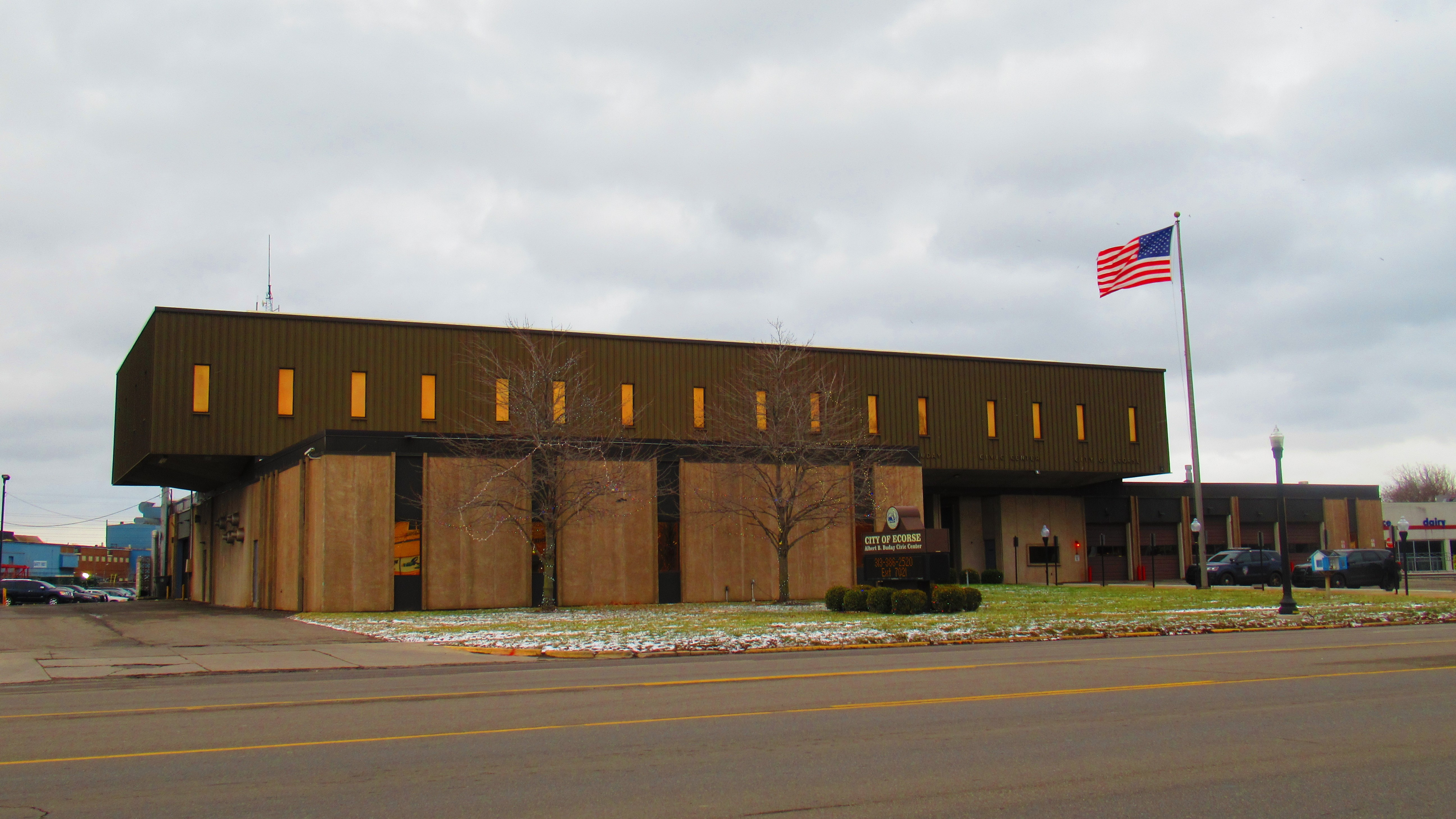
Albert B. Buday Civic Center

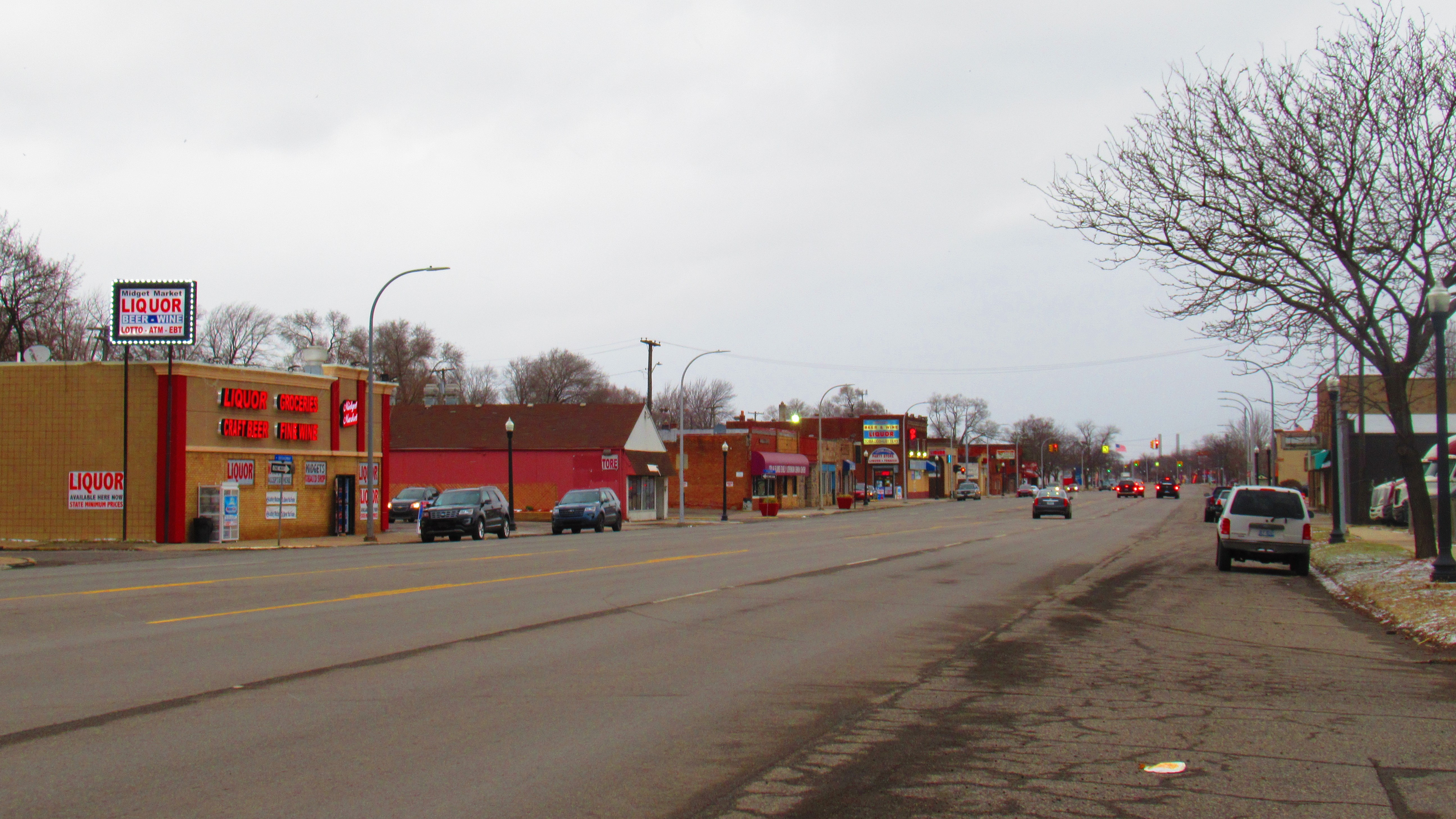
Looking north along W. Jefferson Avenue

Ecorse (/ˈiːkɔːrs/ EE-korss) is a city in Wayne County in the U.S. state of Michigan. An inner-ring, Downriver suburb of Detroit, Ecorse is located roughly 9 miles (14.5 km) southwest of downtown Detroit. As of the 2020 census, the city had a population of 9,305.

Ecorse is part of the Downriver community within Metro Detroit. The city shares a northwestern border with the city of Detroit and also borders the cities of Lincoln Park to the west, River Rouge to the north, and Wyandotte to the south. The city shares its name with the Ecorse River, which forms its southern border with Wyandotte. The Detroit River forms the city's eastern border as part of the Canada–United States border with LaSalle, Ontario.

== Etymology ==
Native American tribes of this area used the location as a burial ground. When French colonists settled here in the last two decades of the 18th century, they named the waterway "Rivière aux Écorses (‘tree-bark river’), denoting a small stream along which Native Americans procured bark for canoes.”

== History ==
In 1836, after the community had become part of United States territory, it was settled by more English speakers, who named it Grand Port. The community was unincorporated within Ecorse Township. In 1903 the settlement was incorporated as the village of Ecorse. With the opening in 1923 of the rolling mill of the Michigan Steel Corporation, a supplier of sheet steel for the automobile industry, Ecorse began to become an economic force in the region. The village incorporated as a city in 1942.

Since the later 20th century and restructuring of heavy industry, the city, like many industrial inner-ring suburbs, has fallen into economic decline. In December 1986, the Wayne County Circuit Court issued a court order appointing a receiver for the bankrupt city. The receivership would last until August 1990, but the city's finances were monitored by the state of Michigan for another ten years.

By September 2009, with the city facing a $9 million deficit and a federal corruption probe, Governor Jennifer Granholm declared a financial emergency for Ecorse, and appointed an emergency financial manager. On September 25, 2009, Ecorse Mayor Herbert Worthy and city Controller Erwin Hollenquest were arrested on charges of conspiracy, bribery, and fraud.

On May 1, 2013, the City of Ecorse was moved from under an emergency manager to a state transition advisory board, which includes the previous emergency manager.

== Geography ==
According to the United States Census Bureau, the city has a total area of 3.69 square miles (9.56 km^{2}), of which 2.80 square miles (7.25 km^{2}) is land and 0.89 square miles (2.31 km^{2}) (24.12%) is water.

The Detroit River forms the eastern border of the city, and the Ecorse River forms the southern boundary. Mud Island within the Detroit River is part of Ecorse and is included in the Detroit River International Wildlife Refuge.

== Education ==
=== Primary and secondary schools ===
Ecorse Public Schools operates the public schools in the city. These include Ralph J. Bunche School (PreK-3), Grandport Elementary School (4–7), and Ecorse Community High School (8–12). Project Excel is a 3-8 magnet school in Ecorse.

=== Public libraries ===
Ecorse Public Library is located in the city. Two Dearborn architects, Bennett and Straight, designed the current library complex, which was built to be fireproof.

The first library services appeared in Ecorse in 1922, when a group of books from the Wayne County Library Service were placed for local use at Loveland's Pharmacy. During the following year, the owner of the pharmacy moved his business to gain a larger space and dedicated a section of the new location to the library. Due to a lack of space for a new book collection, library services were stopped in 1925. Services resumed on March 22, 1926, when the library re-opened in the DeWallot building with 600 volumes of books; for the first time the library had its own quarters. By 1929 the Ecorse library had four staff members. Two operated other library branches in Ecorse: one in the Ecorse Municipal Building and one located on Visger Road.

The current Ecorse Public Library opened on December 12, 1948, with a dedication by Mayor William Vosine. The library's cost was $150,000. The American Library Association selected the library as one of the best small libraries in the United States.

== Parks and recreation ==
Ecorse has a Senior Center and a rowing club. The John D. Dingell Park is located along the Detroit River.

== Demographics ==
Historical population
Census	Pop.	Note	%±
1910	1,063		—
1920	4,394		313.4%
1930	12,716		189.4%
1940	13,209		3.9%
1950	17,948		35.9%
1960	17,328		−3.5%
1970	17,515		1.1%
1980	14,447		−17.5%
1990	12,180		−15.7%
2000	11,229		−7.8%
2010	9,512		−15.3%
2020	9,305		−2.2%
U.S. Decennial Census

=== Racial and ethnic composition ===
Ecorse city, Michigan – Racial and ethnic composition Note: the US Census treats Hispanic/Latino as an ethnic category. This table excludes Latinos from the racial categories and assigns them to a separate category. Hispanics/Latinos may be of any race.
Race / Ethnicity (NH = Non-Hispanic)	Pop 2000	Pop 2010	Pop 2020	% 2000	% 2010	% 2020
White alone (NH)	5,313	3,476	2,705	47.31%	36.54%	29.07%
Black or African American alone (NH)	4,533	4,375	4,253	40.37%	45.99%	45.71%
Native American or Alaska Native alone (NH)	58	58	35	0.52%	0.61%	0.38%
Asian alone (NH)	21	27	31	0.19%	0.28%	0.33%
Native Hawaiian or Pacific Islander alone (NH)	2	1	1	0.02%	0.01%	0.01%
Other race alone (NH)	33	18	61	0.29%	0.19%	0.66%
Mixed race or Multiracial (NH)	265	279	522	2.36%	2.93%	5.61%
Hispanic or Latino (any race)	1,004	1,278	1,697	8.94%	13.44%	18.24%
Total	11,229	9,512	9,305	100.00%	100.00%	100.00%

=== 2020 census ===
As of the 2020 census, Ecorse had a population of 9,305. The median age was 35.3 years. 26.4% of residents were under the age of 18 and 13.7% of residents were 65 years of age or older. For every 100 females there were 93.8 males, and for every 100 females age 18 and over there were 90.9 males age 18 and over.

100.0% of residents lived in urban areas, while 0.0% lived in rural areas.

There were 3,604 households in Ecorse, of which 34.7% had children under the age of 18 living in them. Of all households, 21.7% were married-couple households, 25.9% were households with a male householder and no spouse or partner present, and 43.1% were households with a female householder and no spouse or partner present. About 33.5% of all households were made up of individuals and 12.2% had someone living alone who was 65 years of age or older.

There were 4,122 housing units, of which 12.6% were vacant. The homeowner vacancy rate was 1.5% and the rental vacancy rate was 9.3%.

=== 2010 census ===
At the 2010 census there were 9,512 people in 3,646 households, including 2,285 families, in the city. The population density was 3,397.1 inhabitants per square mile (1,311.6/km^{2}). There were 4,544 housing units at an average density of 1,622.9 per square mile (626.6/km^{2}). The racial makeup of the city was 44.0% White (36.5% non-Hispanic white), 46.4% African American, 0.8% Native American, 0.3% Asian, 4.0% from other races, and 4.6% from two or more races. Hispanic or Latino residents of any race were 13.4%.

Of the 3,646 households 34.6% had children under the age of 18 living with them, 24.7% were married couples living together, 29.3% had a female householder with no husband present, 8.7% had a male householder with no wife present, and 37.3% were non-families. 31.3% of households were one person and 11.8% were one person aged 65 or older. The average household size was 2.60 and the average family size was 3.26.

The median age was 35.4 years. 27.1% of residents were under the age of 18; 10.1% were between the ages of 18 and 24; 24.7% were from 25 to 44; 25.3% were from 45 to 64; and 12.8% were 65 or older. The gender makeup of the city was 47.3% male and 52.7% female.

=== 2000 census ===
At the 2000 census there were 11,229 people in 4,339 households, including 2,733 families, in the city. The population density was 4,175.1 inhabitants per square mile (1,612.0/km^{2}). There were 4,861 housing units at an average density of 1,807.4 per square mile (697.8/km^{2}). The racial makeup of the city was 52.18% White, 40.56% African American, 0.65% Native American, 0.19% Asian, 0.02% Pacific Islander, 3.36% from other races, and 3.05% from two or more races. Hispanic or Latino of any race were 8.94%. and 5.8% Irish ancestry according to Census 2000. 92.7% spoke only English at home, while 6.3% spoke Spanish.

Of the 4,339 households 30.0% had children under the age of 18 living with them, 31.0% were married couples living together, 25.1% had a female householder with no husband present, and 37.0% were non-families. 31.1% of households were one person and 10.7% were one person aged 65 or older. The average household size was 2.58 and the average family size was 3.23.

The age distribution was 27.8% under the age of 18, 9.8% from 18 to 24, 29.3% from 25 to 44, 20.7% from 45 to 64, and 12.3% 65 or older. The median age was 33 years. For every 100 females, there were 94.8 males. For every 100 females age 18 and over, there were 91.3 males.

The median household income was $27,142 and the median family income was $32,374. Males had a median income of $33,915 versus $22,500 for females. The per capita income for the city was $14,468. About 17.3% of families and 22.6% of the population were below the poverty line, including 34.2% of those under age 18 and 12.2% of those age 65 or over.
