= Lincoln Park High School (Michigan) =

High school in Michigan, United States

Location
- 1701 Champaign Road; Lincoln Park, Wayne County, Michigan 48146; United States; 42°14′42″N 83°11′20″W

Information
- School type: public high school
- Opened: 1957
- Status: Open
- School district: Lincoln Park Public Schools.
- Superintendent: Terry Dangerfield
- Principal: Matthew Kaminski
- Teaching staff: 65.25 (FTE)
- Grades: 9-12
- Gender: coed
- Enrollment: 1,391 (2023–2024)
- Student to teacher ratio: 21.32
- Colors: Orange and Blue
- Team name: Railsplitters
- Accreditation: North Central Association
- Yearbook: The Log
- Website: School website

Student assessments
- 2021–22 school year Change vs. prior year

M-STEP 11th grade proficiency rates (Science / Social Studies)
- Advanced %: ≤5 / ≤5
- Proficient %: – / –
- PR. Proficient %: 10.3 / 53.9
- Not Proficient %: 75.0 / 35.2

Average test scores
- SAT Total: 823.0 (▼ −51.3)

Lincoln Park High School (LPHS) is a public school in Lincoln Park, Michigan. The school colors are orange and blue, and the teams are called the Railsplitters, a reference to Abraham Lincoln. It is a part of Lincoln Park Public Schools.

LPHS has a student-to-teacher ratio of 35:1 and was given a rating of "C" as of 2010 it has been given a "B" by the Michigan Department of Education in 2007–2008. As of the class of 2011, LPHS has a graduation rate of 63.5% (starting with about 490 students, now having about 232) and an attendance rate of 75%.

LPHS has many programs and extra curricular activities including the Spanish Club, Lincoln Park Building Trades, Guitar Club, Anime Club, JROTC, FIRST Robotics Competition, National Honor Society, four school bands (marching, symphonic, and concert), an award winning theatre program, E.M.T. Education, Business Management, CADD, Agriscience, and Quiz Bowl.

Lincoln Park athletics compete in the Downriver League.

== History ==
The current building is the second building in the city to be called "Lincoln Park High School". The previous building was constructed in 1930, and would later become Leo W. Huff Junior High School (grades 7–9) after serving as the city's high school from 1933 to 1960. It would be the first high school in the state recognized by the University of Michigan before it was accredited by the North Central Association. Huff was closed in the early 1980s due to diminishing class sizes, and it remained empty for several years before the Board of Education decided that it should be demolished.

Prior to 1933, high school classes had been held in the Goodell School, located on the northwest corner of Champaign and Fort St, which was demolished in 1971. The bell from this school was saved, and is now in place at the Lincoln Park Historical Museum. This school was the third to hold the name "Goodell School". The first was a wood-framed, single-room school house built in the 1870s, and the second was the brick building built to replace it in 1918.

In a period prior to 1947, Lincoln Park High was one of the schools serving high school students from the Allen Park School District. That year, Allen Park High School in Allen Park opened.

The current high school building for Lincoln Park High began construction in 1957 and was finished and opened in September, 1960 housing grades 9 through 12. The first graduating class from the new school was in January, 1961. The school was state of the art for its time with its orb type roof design over the auditorium, cafeteria, library and gym areas. The new school contained a dedicated auditorium, and a state of the art pool with diving area and full glass window panels which could open to an enclosed outside area. The T-shaped pool also contained an observation window in the deep/diving end accessed through one of the many tunnels. The pool area contains spectator seating/bleachers. The school also was designed with a gym which could be divided into three sections using folding walls to accommodate individual classes. The gym, when completely opened, often hosted the school's home basketball and other spectator sporting events. The two "outer" gym areas were used to accommodate wooden pull-out bleachers which when not in use, were rolled into a wall unit on the north and south ends of the gym.

The school originally contained mahogany panels in the "library" hallway with upholstered cushions in the seating areas adjacent to the library and auditorium as well as other areas throughout the school. The "shop wing" (east) contained industrial arts and other trade related classes complete with a classroom area where cars could be pulled into the building through shop doors. The cafeteria contained a full service modern kitchen. The eating area was surrounded by plate glass windows provided an "open to outside" design. Windows in the roof "curves" provided more light onto the already bright eating area. Natural light was an important consideration in all areas of the school design with plenty of plate glass windows strategically placed throughout the school.

The building was designed to be heated with steam and powered by three natural gas-fired boilers located near the loading dock on the east side of the building. Steam lines travel underground to provide heat to different areas of the building. The original thermostat lines in the Auditorium area needed to be replaced after heat control to that area of the building could not be controlled. The auditorium was pre-fabricated for air conditioning when it was constructed. One year, during a service, a boiler was improperly fired causing an explosion. The explosion was of such force that it blew the back of the boiler off carrying one of the men with it into steam lines located behind the boiler and bending the lines.

Since its opening, most of the original plate glass in the building has been replaced with energy efficient panels to improve energy efficiency. The building currently houses approximately 50% of its original intended population.

== Notable alumni ==
Most of the members of the rock band MC5 graduated from Lincoln Park High School. Although he did not graduate from Lincoln Park High School, singer Bob Seger did attend LPHS for a time and still can be seen in class photos displayed in its halls.

== Sources ==
- Staff of The Lincoln Park Preservation Alliance (December 2, 2005). Lincoln Park, Michigan. South Carolina: Arcadia Publishing. p. 77. ISBN 978-0-7385-3970-6. "Named for the first superintendent of the Lincoln Park schools."
