= Lincoln Park, Michigan =

- City
- City of Lincoln Park
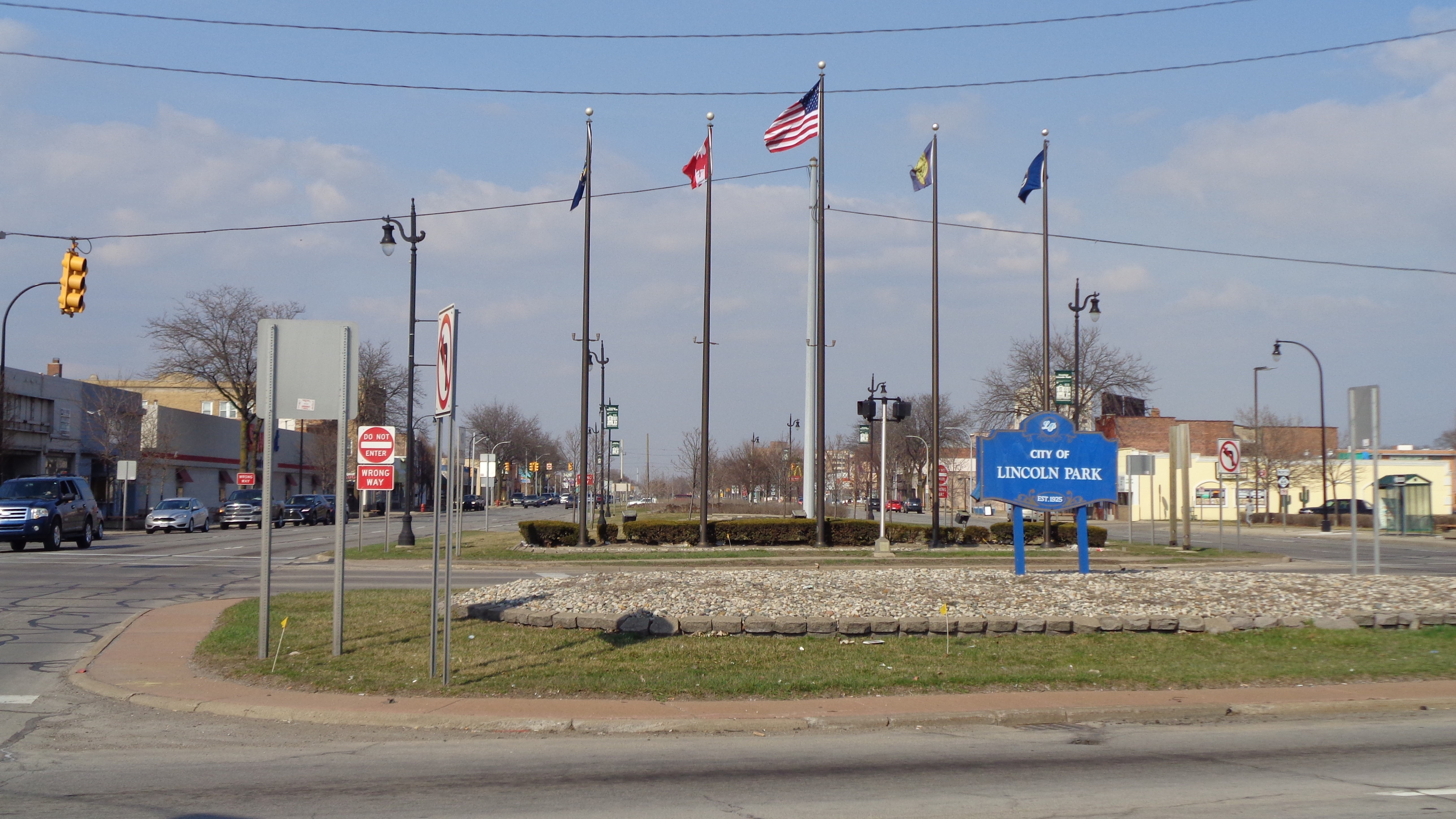
- Intersection of Southfield Road and Fort Street

- Seal Logo
- Nickname: Crossroads of Downriver
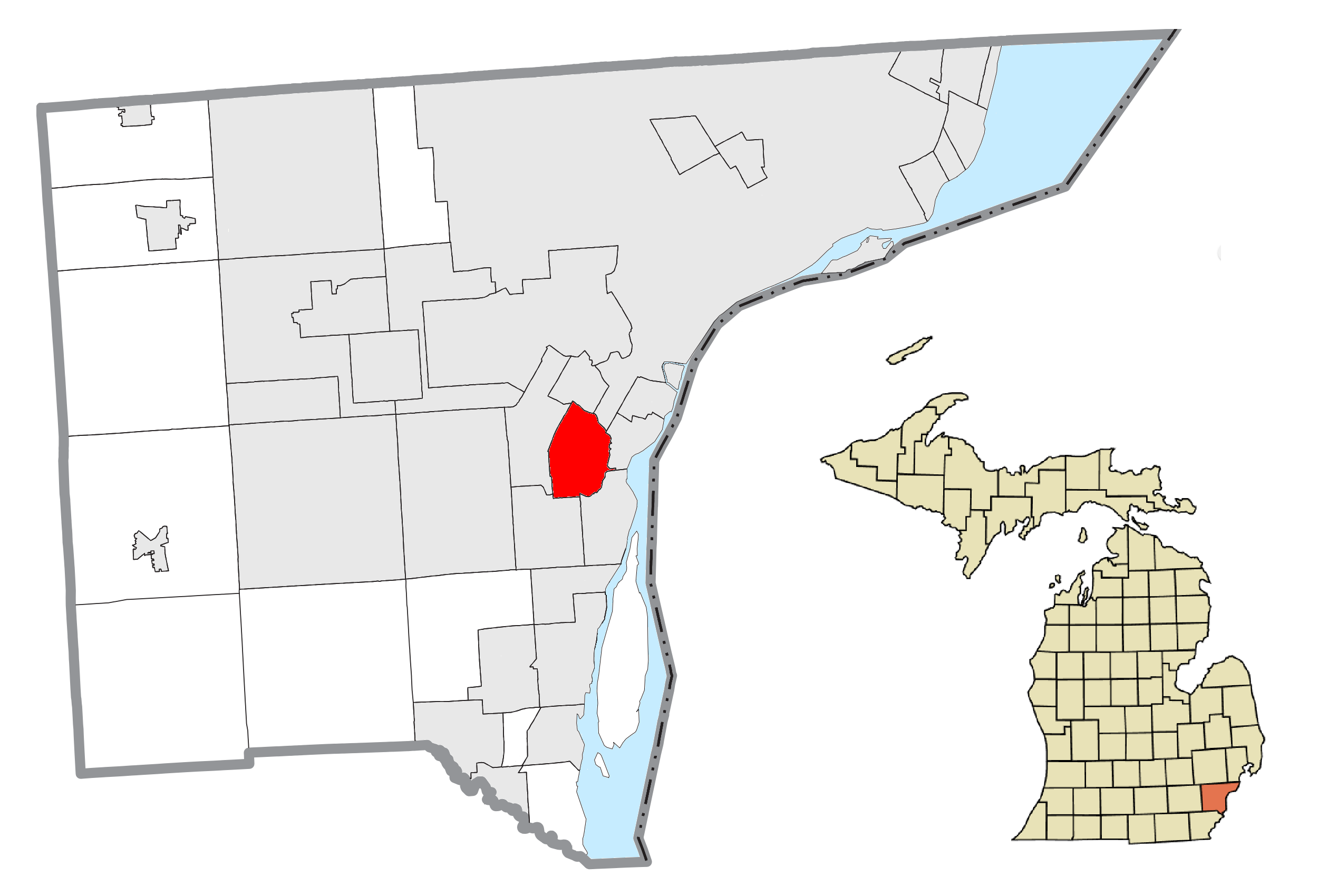
- Location within Wayne County

- Location within the state of Michigan Location within the United States
- Coordinates: 42°14′37″N 83°10′51″W
- Country: United States
- State: Michigan
- County: Wayne
- Incorporated: 1921 (village); 1925 (city)

Government
  - Type: Mayor–council
  - Mayor: Maureen Tobin
  - Clerk: Kerry Kehrer

Area
  - City: 5.85 sq mi (15.15 km^{2})
  - Land: 5.84 sq mi (15.12 km^{2})
  - Water: 0.015 sq mi (0.04 km^{2})
- Elevation: 587 ft (179 m)

Population (2020)
  - City: 40,245
  - Density: 6,895.7/sq mi (2,662.44/km^{2})
  - Metro: 4,285,832 (Metro Detroit)
- Time zone: UTC-5 (EST)
  - Summer (DST): UTC-4 (EDT)
- ZIP code(s): 48146; 48101 (Allen Park); 48192 (Wyandotte); 48229 (Ecorse)
- Area code: 313
- FIPS code: 26-47800
- GNIS feature ID: 0630462
- Website: www.citylp.com

Lincoln Park is a city in Wayne County in the U.S. state of Michigan. A Downriver suburb of Detroit, Lincoln Park is located roughly 11 miles (17.7 km) southwest of downtown Detroit. As of the 2020 census, Lincoln Park had a population of 40,245, and was the second most-densely populated municipality in the state, after Hamtramck.

Lincoln Park contains Council Point Park, which dates back to 1763 when Chief Pontiac met with other tribal leaders along the banks of the Ecorse River to plot a rebellion against increasing European settlers, specifically those in nearby Fort Detroit. The Potawatomi eventually ceded the land to the French in 1776.

Lincoln Park is considered part of the Downriver collection of communities within Metro Detroit. The city borders Detroit to the north and also shares borders with Allen Park to the west, Ecorse to the east, Melvindale to the north, and Southgate and Wyandotte to the south. It developed as a bedroom community, providing homes to workers in the nearby steel mills and automobile plants of the Detroit area, while having no industries of its own. Lincoln Park was originally part of the now-defunct Ecorse Township, incorporating as a village in 1921 and again as a city in 1925.

One of the most enduring landmarks in the city was the Sears water tower located at the Lincoln Park Shopping Plaza. It was demolished in 2026.

== History ==
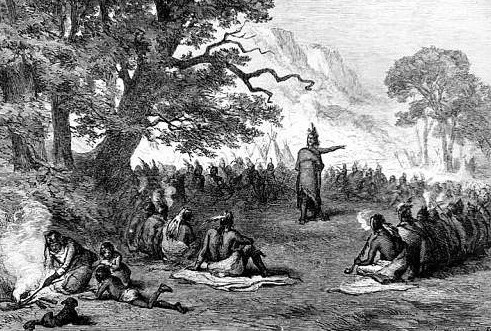
Pontiac's council

Long before Lincoln Park was incorporated as a city, an area along the Ecorse River was the site of a pivotal meeting during Pontiac's Rebellion. On April 27, 1763, a council of several American Indian tribes from the Detroit region listened to a speech from the Ottawa leader Pontiac. Pontiac urged the listeners to join him in a surprise attack on the British Fort Detroit, which they attempted on May 9. Today, the area is known as Council Point Park, and a small engraved boulder marks the site of the historic meeting.

Neighborhoods were first laid in the area of Ecorse Township that would become Lincoln Park in 1906. It was incorporated as a village in 1921, and as a city in 1925.

Preston Tucker, famous for his controversial financing and development of the revolutionary 1948 Tucker Sedan, grew up in Lincoln Park in the early 1900s. Tucker joined the Lincoln Park Police Department in his early years to gain access to the high performance cars the department used.

During the 20th century, Lincoln Park grew as a bedroom community for the numerous workers at Henry Ford's River Rouge Plant and other mills and factories of the auto industry. Two major shopping hubs were constructed in the 1950s: Lincoln Park Plaza in 1955 on the southeast side and the Lincoln Park Shopping Center the following year on the northwest side.

Among Lincoln Park's minor claims to fame is that it was the home of the members of the seminal punk rock group MC5 in the 1960s. The band was rumored to have evolved out of the group's habit of listening to music from a car radio in the parking lot of the local White Castle restaurant in the small downtown area. Gary Grimshaw, a noted rock concert poster artist, grew up in Lincoln Park at the same time.

== Geography ==
According to the United States Census Bureau, the city has a total area of 5.89 square miles (15.26 km^{2}), all land.

The north and south branches of the Ecorse River run through Lincoln Park and join just before leaving the city. Lincoln Park borders the cities of Detroit, Allen Park, Melvindale, Ecorse, Wyandotte, and Southgate.

== Demographics ==
Historical population
Census	Pop.	Note	%±
1930	12,336		—
1940	15,236		23.5%
1950	29,310		92.4%
1960	53,933		84.0%
1970	52,984		−1.8%
1980	45,105		−14.9%
1990	41,832		−7.3%
2000	40,008		−4.4%
2010	38,144		−4.7%
2020	40,245		5.5%
U.S. Decennial Census

=== Racial and ethnic composition ===
Lincoln Park city, Michigan – Racial and ethnic composition Note: the US Census treats Hispanic/Latino as an ethnic category. This table excludes Latinos from the racial categories and assigns them to a separate category. Hispanics/Latinos may be of any race.
Race / Ethnicity (NH = Non-Hispanic)	Pop 2000	Pop 2010	Pop 2020	% 2000	% 2010	% 2020
White alone (NH)	35,701	29,102	23,652	89.23%	76.30%	58.77%
Black or African American alone (NH)	810	2,172	3,693	2.02%	5.69%	9.18%
Native American or Alaska Native alone (NH)	173	205	136	0.43%	0.54%	0.34%
Asian alone (NH)	198	183	208	0.49%	0.48%	0.52%
Native Hawaiian or Pacific Islander alone (NH)	2	8	24	0.00%	0.02%	0.06%
Other race alone (NH)	30	28	200	0.07%	0.07%	0.50%
Mixed race or Multiracial (NH)	538	770	1,952	1.34%	2.02%	4.85%
Hispanic or Latino (any race)	2,556	5,676	10,380	6.39%	14.88%	25.79%
Total	40,008	38,144	40,245	100.00%	100.00%	100.00%

=== 2020 census ===
As of the 2020 census, Lincoln Park had a population of 40,245. The median age was 36.5 years. 24.0% of residents were under the age of 18 and 12.9% of residents were 65 years of age or older. For every 100 females there were 99.7 males, and for every 100 females age 18 and over there were 97.6 males age 18 and over.

100.0% of residents lived in urban areas, while 0.0% lived in rural areas.

There were 15,614 households in Lincoln Park, of which 32.2% had children under the age of 18 living in them. Of all households, 35.9% were married-couple households, 24.0% were households with a male householder and no spouse or partner present, and 30.3% were households with a female householder and no spouse or partner present. About 30.0% of all households were made up of individuals and 10.8% had someone living alone who was 65 years of age or older.

There were 16,532 housing units, of which 5.6% were vacant. The homeowner vacancy rate was 1.3% and the rental vacancy rate was 5.5%.

Racial composition as of the 2020 census
Race	Number	Percent
White	25,750	64.0%
Black or African American	3,863	9.6%
American Indian and Alaska Native	364	0.9%
Asian	231	0.6%
Native Hawaiian and Other Pacific Islander	27	0.1%
Some other race	5,074	12.6%
Two or more races	4,936	12.3%

=== 2010 census ===
As of the census of 2010, there were 38,144 people, 14,924 households, and 9,685 families living in the city. The population density was 6,476.1 inhabitants per square mile (2,500.4/km^{2}). There were 16,530 housing units at an average density of 2,806.5 per square mile (1,083.6/km^{2}). The racial makeup of the city was 84.2% White, 5.9% African American, 0.7% Native American, 0.5% Asian, 5.4% from other races, and 3.2% from two or more races. Hispanic or Latino of any race were 14.9% of the population.

There were 14,924 households, of which 34.4% had children under the age of 18 living with them, 40.8% were married couples living together, 16.9% had a female householder with no husband present, 7.2% had a male householder with no wife present, and 35.1% were non-families. 29.0% of all households were made up of individuals, and 9.8% had someone living alone who was 65 years of age or older. The average household size was 2.55 and the average family size was 3.13.

The median age in the city was 36.7 years. 24.8% of residents were under the age of 18; 8.7% were between the ages of 18 and 24; 28.7% were from 25 to 44; 26.3% were from 45 to 64; and 11.5% were 65 years of age or older. The gender makeup of the city was 49.0% male and 51.0% female.

=== 2000 census ===
As of the census of 2000, there were 40,008 people, 16,204 households, and 10,581 families living in the city. The population density was 6,834.9 inhabitants per square mile (2,639.0/km^{2}). There were 16,821 housing units at an average density of 2,873.7 per square mile (1,109.5/km^{2}). The racial makeup of the city was 93.26% White, 2.06% Black or African American, 0.53% Native American, 0.51% Asian, 0.00% Pacific Islander, 1.82% from other races, and 1.81% from two or more races. 6.39% of the population were Hispanic or Latino of any race.

There were 16,204 households, out of which 30.2% had children under the age of 18 living with them, 46.3% were married couples living together, 13.3% had a female householder with no husband present, and 34.7% were non-families. 29.3% of all households were made up of individuals, and 11.3% had someone living alone who was 65 years of age or older. The average household size was 2.46 and the average family size was 3.04.

In the city, the population was spread out, with 24.3% under the age of 18, 8.5% from 18 to 24, 32.7% from 25 to 44, 20.4% from 45 to 64, and 14.1% who were 65 years of age or older. The median age was 36 years. For every 100 females, there were 95.7 males. For every 100 females age 18 and over, there were 93.7 males.

The median income for a household in the city was $22,515, and the median income for a family was $29,747. Males had a median income of $10,197 versus $6,549 for females. The per capita income for the city was $14,140. About 40.1% of families and 44.7% of the population were below the poverty line, including 20.3% of those under age 18 and 4.7% of those age 65 or over.

=== Ethnic groups ===
Hispanics/Latinos make up about 15% of Lincoln Park residents. The city hosted its first Cinco de Mayo celebration in 2015. Many Hispanic businesses have opened along Dix Highway and Fort Street.

== Highways ==
- I-75
- US 25: former designation (decommissioned in 1973); ran concurrent with Interstate 75
- M-39: named locally as Southfield Road; terminus just west of M-85
- M-85: named locally as Fort Street
- Outer Drive forms most of the northern border of Lincoln Park with the cities of Detroit and Melvindale.

== Education ==
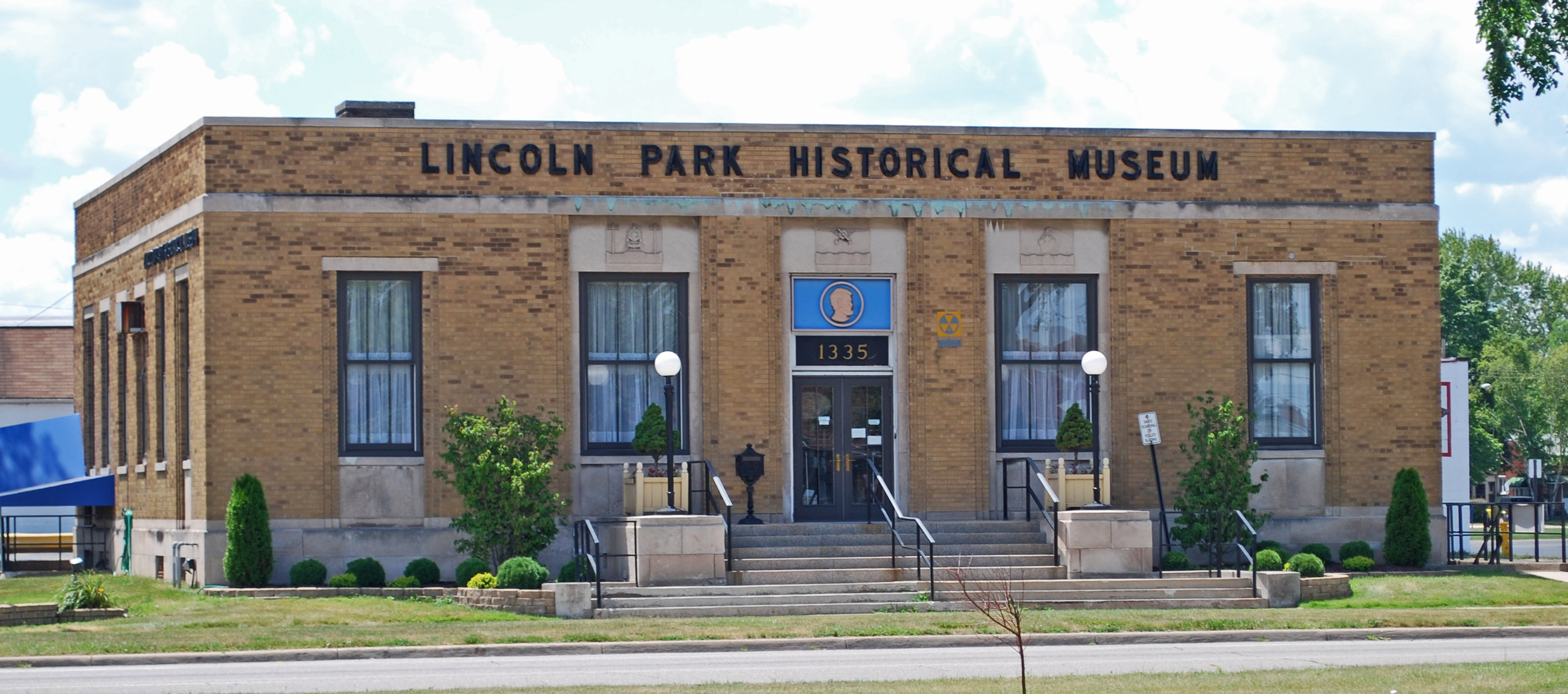
Lincoln Park Post Office, now the historical museum

The city's education system is served by the Lincoln Park Public Schools primarily serving its 19,700 people under the age of 18. The district includes Lincoln Park High School, Lincoln Park Middle School, Carr Elementary, James A. Foote Elementary, Hoover Elementary, Keppen Elementary, Lafayette Elementary, Paun Elementary, and Raupp Elementary.

Lincoln Park's private schools include Christ the Good Shepherd, which conformed with the schools of Mt. Carmel and Wyandotte Catholic to create Pope John Paul II.

== Notable people ==
- MC5, rock band formed in the city in 1964
- Dennis Brown, collegiate football player and coach
- Arnold Earley, Major League Baseball pitcher from 1960 to 1967
- Bill Morrison, comic book artist and writer
- Larry Pashnick, Major League Baseball pitcher from 1982 to 1984
- Bob Seger, singer, songwriter, and musician; attended Lincoln Park High School
- Preston Tucker, automobile entrepreneur, designer of the Tucker 48
