= Gladwin (surname) =

Gladwin is an English surname derived from the Middle English name Glad(e)wine (or Gledwine), which is composed of words meaning "cheerful" and "friend". Notable people with the surname include:

- Chris Gladwin (cricketer) (born 1962), English cricketer
- Chris Gladwin (engineer) (born 1964), American engineer and entrepreneur
- Cliff Gladwin (1916–1988), English cricketer
- Derek Oliver Gladwin, Baron Gladwin of Clee (1930–2003), British trade unionist
- George Gladwin (1907–?), English footballer
- Harold S. Gladwin, American archaeologist, anthropologist and stockbroker
- Henry Gladwin (1729 or 1730–1791), British military leader
- Joe Gladwin (1906–1987), British actor
- John Gladwin (born 1942), Bishop of Chelmsford in the Church of England
- Mary E. Gladwin (1861–1939), American nurse
- Phil Gladwin, television writer and script editor
- Thomas Gladwin (musician) (1710–1799), English composer and musician
- Thomas Gladwin (sheriff) (1629/30–1697), Sheriff of Derbyshire
- Walter Gladwin (1902–1988), New York City politician

== See also ==
- Gladwin (disambiguation)#People, for people who use it as a forename
- Gladwyn, for the forename derived from the surname
