= Siege of Fort Detroit =

Siege during Pontiac's War

Coordinates: 42°19′41″N 83°02′52″W

- Part of Pontiac's War
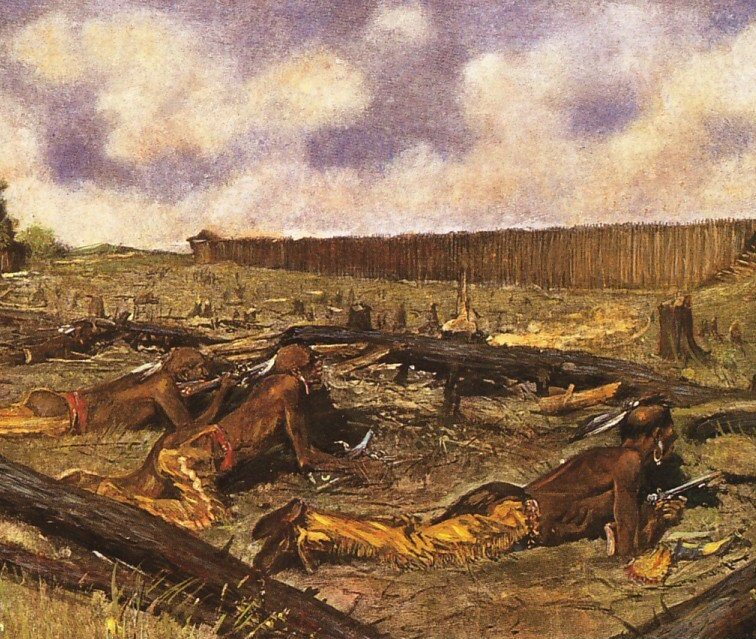
- The Siege of the Fort at Detroit; Frederic Remington
Date	May 9, 1763 – October 31, 1763 (5 months, 3 weeks and 1 day)
Location	Now Detroit, Michigan, United States
Result	British victory

Belligerents
Pontiac's confederacy	Great Britain

Commanders and leaders
Pontiac; Wasson	Henry Gladwin; Donald Campbell †

The siege of Fort Detroit was an ultimately unsuccessful attempt by North American Natives to capture Fort Detroit during Pontiac's War. The siege was led primarily by Pontiac, an Ottawa chief and military leader. This rebellion would be one of the catalysts that hastened the declaration of the Proclamation of 1763 which would eventually precipitate the events leading to the American Revolution.

== Background ==
Fort Detroit had been captured by the British during the French and Indian War following the Fall of Montreal in 1760. It was on territory ceded by France to Great Britain in the Treaty of Paris in 1763 and was garrisoned by a British force during Pontiac's War. Originally allied with the British forces due to promises of blankets, gunpowder, and rum among other valuables, a large force of 700 Native Americans—Ottawas, Pottawatomis, Hurons (Wyandots), and Chippewas (Ojibways)—watched as the fort changed hands on November 29, 1760, French commander Captain François-Marie Picoté de Belestre handing the fort to famous British Ranger commander Major Robert Rogers. After the British took control over Fort Detroit, the native inhabitants surrounding the fort grew discontent at the amount of goods that were being made available to trade to them. Primarily, the natives were upset at the lack of rum, powder, ammunition, and gifts that were offered by the British for trading. Yet despite attempts by the Colonial Superintendent to Indian Affairs, Sir William Johnson, to appease the natives by gifting them garden hoes, and promising lower trade prices, a physician available at the fort, and a gunsmith, the natives remained distrustful of the new British garrison. Looking to take advantage of this growing animosity towards the British and tacit support from local French settlers, a highly influential Ottawa Chief by the name of Pontiac gathered neighboring tribes to form a military alliance. On the night of April 27, 1763, Chief Pontiac held a council 10 miles form Fort Detroit off the Ecorse River where he was able to recruit, using the teachings of Neolin the local tribes of the Pottawatomi, Hurons, and Chippewas, along with his tribe of Ottawa to launch an assault on the British garrison at Detroit in the future.

The life of Pontiac before the events of the siege are not well known. Although, it is known that he was born into the two most powerful tribes of the Great Lakes area in the Ojibwa and Ottawa (his parents were of those tribes). He participated in the French and Indian War where he gained influence among other tribes in lobbying other chiefs into continue supporting the French. It is estimated that he was between 40 and 50 years old at the start of the Siege of Detroit.

== First attempt ==
Before attempting any serious assault on the fort, Pontiac ventured to Fort Detroit with a following of 40–50 Ottawa to conduct a reconnaissance of the Fort so as to estimate the strength of the garrison and identify trading posts to plunder. Upon entering Pontiac entertained British officers with a ceremonial dance while 10 of his followers dispersed through the stockade. On May 6, 1763, a small surveying party on the St Clair River from Fort Detroit was ambushed and the occupants either captured or killed; (among those killed was Sir Robert Davers, 5th Baronet).

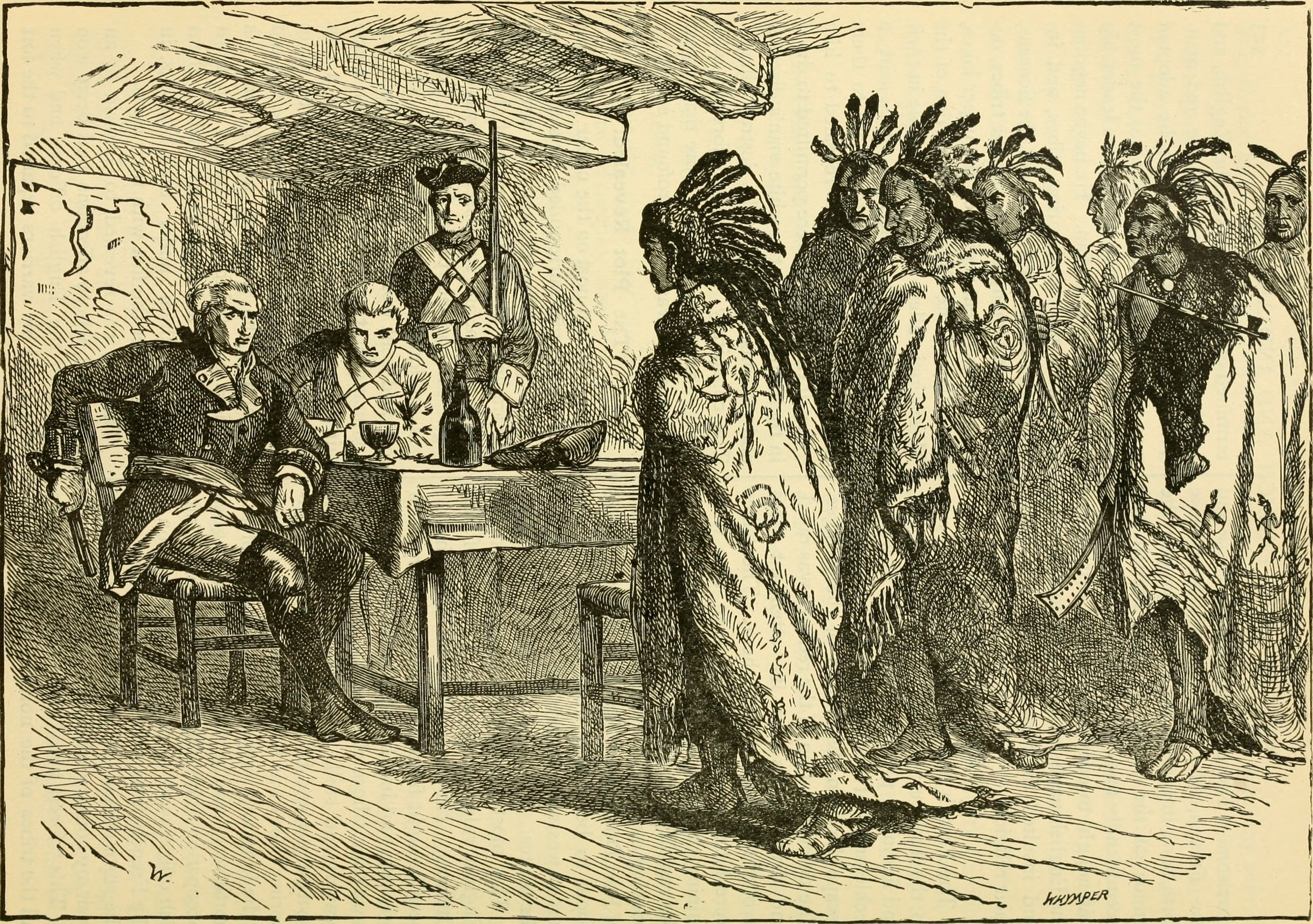
Illustration Pontiac visiting Gladwin by "WLJ" in Cassell's History of the World

On May 7, Pontiac entered the fort with about 300 men, armed with weapons hidden under blankets, determined to take the fort by surprise. The plan was for Pontiac to give a speech to Major Gladwin while holding a wampum belt. Once Pontiac gave the signal, the 60 Ottawa in the fort would attack the British forces while the Huron and Pottawatomi forces surrounded the fort to capture any settlers and intercept British reinforcements. However, the British commander, Major Henry Gladwin, had apparently been informed of Pontiac's plan, and the garrison of about 120 men was armed and ready. Pontiac withdrew and, two days later, laid siege to the fort.

On May 9, Pontiac returned with a contingent of 64 canoes filled with his followers and demanded that he be let in so as to smoke with Gladwin. Gladwin responded that only Pontiac would be let in which prompted Pontiac to give up his subversive activities and initiate the siege. Immediately after the initiation of the siege, a number of British soldiers and civilians in the area outside the fort were captured or killed; one of the soldiers was ritually cannibalized, as was the custom in some Great Lakes Indian cultures. The violence was directed only at the British: French colonists were left alone. Eventually more than 900 Indian warriors from a half-dozen tribes would join the siege.

== Siege ==
At the start of the siege, Pontiac moved his encampment 2 miles North of Fort Detroit at the mouth of what is now Bloody Run Creek (formerly Parent's Creek) which would become the site of a major ambush later. Shortly after the start of the siege, Pontiac met with two British officers to inquire about a potential peace at the house of a Frenchman. There, Pontiac took the two men hostage until resolution of the peace talks. With the peace talk going nowhere, Pontiac renewed his assault on the fort, but his weapons were ineffectual against the walls of the fort. Eventually, Pontiac's forces pulled back their front line which enabled the British to venture out of the fort and destroy any potential cover (trees, fences) for the Indians that surrounded the fort.

At the start of the siege, Fort Detroit was a square shaped stockade at 1,000 yards circumference surrounded by a palisade with cannons and mortars mounted on bastions. Inside the fort resided approximately 2,500 people with 120 fighting men who consisted of one company of the 60th Royal American and Queen's Rangers along with armed traders and loyal Frenchmen. The supplies of the fort were dwindling with only ten days rations left at the start of the siege. Directly outside the fort, on the Detroit River, was the schooner Huron and the sloop Michigan each armed with six and ten cannons respectively. In need of supplies and reinforcements, a force of close to a hundred men set out on Lake Erie to reach Fort Detroit. Those who escaped made their way to Fort Sandusky, but found it destroyed, and so they returned to Fort Niagara. The Indians took their captives to Detroit, where they were tortured and mutilated. The bodies were then tossed into the river to float by Fort Detroit, which undermined morale in the fort. The detachment of small boats led by a Lieutenant Cuyler, stopped by the mouth of the Detroit River on the North shore to make camp when they were ambushed. Only 40 of the detachment escaped along with Lieutenant Cuyler while close to 60 were killed or captured. This battle would eventually become known as the Battle of Point Pelee.

Not long after the battle, the schooner Huron fought off an assault of canoes that were approaching it from all sides. 14 of Pontiac's men were killed in the failed assault with no British casualties. The ships were targeted again on the night of July 9 when Pontiac sent small boats filled with burning sticks and tar to ignite the wooden hulls of the ships. The ships were able to dodge the floating hazards and were subjected to the same the following night although neither attempts by Pontiac's forces were successful.

On July 29, a force of 260 British soldiers commanded by Captain James Dalyell arrived on the river to reinforce Fort Detroit along with a contingent of Queen's Rangers led by Robert Rogers himself.

== Battle of Bloody Run ==
The day after arriving at the fort, Captain Dalyell persuaded Major Gladwin to allow him to take a force of 247 soldiers and ambush Pontiac's encampment. The force started out at 2:30 am towards Parent's Creek (now Bloody Run Creek) where they were instead ambushed by 150 of Pontiac's men who had advance intelligence from French spies that a British force was incoming. Pontiac laid a plan to trap the British and sent 250 of his warriors to prevent the British retreat back towards the fort. Upon first crossing the river, the British force was met with a wave of Indian gunfire and retreated in confusion. While the British were eventually able to break through Pontiac's trap by capturing a local barn to provide covering fire while the rest of the force fought their way back up until reaching the fort doors. It cost them 23 dead, 34 wounded, and the death of Captain Dalyell.

== End of the siege ==
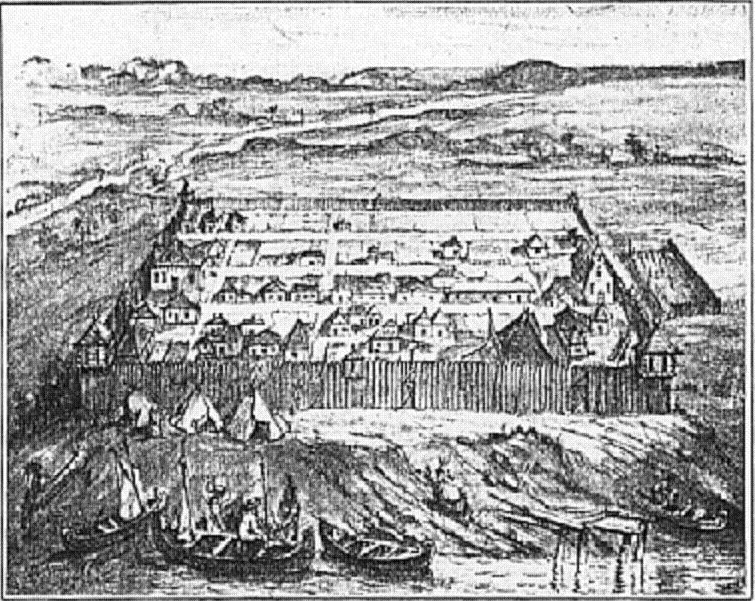
Fort Detroit circa 1710

The fort would hold throughout the summer and fall without much military action from either side since both were keen to avoid losses. However, the situation at the fort remained a stalemate, and Pontiac's influence among his followers began to wane. Groups of Indians began to abandon the siege, some of them making peace with the British before departing. On October 31, 1763, finally convinced that the French in Illinois would not come to his aid, Pontiac lifted the siege and traveled south to the Maumee River, where he continued his efforts to rally opposition to the British.

Ultimately, Pontiac's unsuccessful attempt to take Fort Detroit, along with the wider war led by him, did not change the relationship between the British and the natives that existed before the conflict. Native life was greatly disrupted from losing many people and opportunities to invest in other economic activities. For the British, this ensured that they could focus their attention on the coastal colonies since the backcountry was mostly subdued. In time (October 1763), this would result in the Royal Proclamation of 1763 that would signify a change in British policy towards the American frontier that would play a role in the outbreak of the American Revolutionary War.

== See also ==
- Council Point Park
