= Chris Gladwin =

Chris Gladwin may refer to:

- Chris Gladwin (cricketer)
- Chris Gladwin (engineer)
