= Tapton, Derbyshire =

Suburb of Chesterfield, England

Coordinates: 53.247636°N 1.412128°W

Tapton
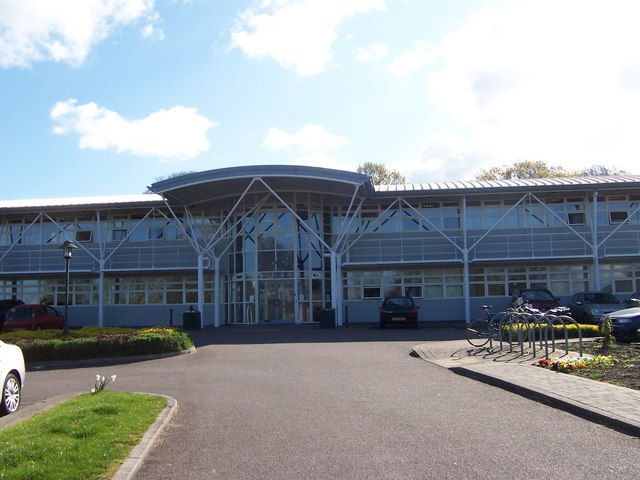
- Tapton Innovation Centre

- Location within Derbyshire
- District: Chesterfield
- Shire county: Derbyshire
- Region: East Midlands
- Country: England
- Sovereign state: United Kingdom
- Post town: CHESTERFIELD
- Postcode district: S41
- Dialling code: 01246
- Police: Derbyshire
- Fire: Derbyshire
- Ambulance: East Midlands
- UK Parliament: Chesterfield

Tapton is a suburb of Chesterfield, in the county of Derbyshire, England. It is located along the Brimington Road B6543, between Chesterfield town centre, and Brimington (where the population is included in the Brimington South Ward). It became a suburb of Chesterfield in the 1920s. The buildings along Brimington road, which runs through the centre of Tapton, are testament to this fact. Consisting of semi-detached houses in a style typical of the 20s and 30s.

The district is also home to Tapton House, in Tapton Woods, the woods being the former grounds of the house, now a Municipal park.

Tapton Lock Visitor Centre is located on the Chesterfield Canal to the north of Tapton Park.

== History ==
Located in the grounds of the House, is a large mound or hill, once the moat, of Chesterfield Castle or Tapton Castle as it was sometimes also known. The castle at least dates as far back as the Norman Conquest and later fell into the hands of the Crown, becoming a Crown Fortress. During the English Civil War, the castle was razed to the ground, by Parliamentarian forces.

Tapton was formerly a township in the parish of Chesterfield, in 1866 Tapton became a separate civil parish, on 9 November 1920 the parish was abolished and merged with Chesterfield. In 1911 the parish had a population of 441. It is now in the unparished area of Chesterfield, in the Chesterfield district.

== Tapton Hall ==
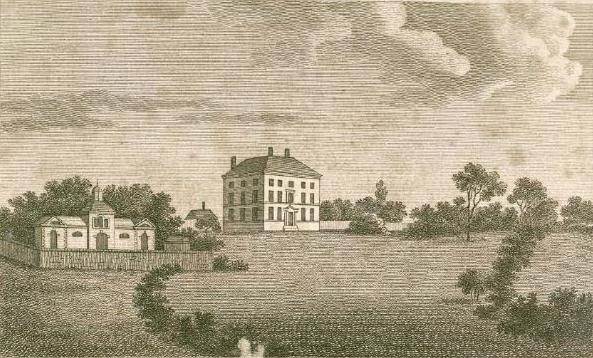
"Tapton Hall, Derbyshire", 18th century engraving by J. Eastgate

Tapton Hall, Derbyshire (not to be confused with Tapton Hall, Sheffield). In 1638 the lordship of Tapton with a capital messuage known as Tapton Hall was sold by Durant Allsopp and Thomas Allsopp, gentlemen, also of Durant Hall, Holy Well Street, Chesterfield, to George Taylor (d.1668) of London, Vintner, with closes (fields) at Brimington with several other properties including Durant Hall. Taylor left instructions in his will for the founding of alms houses, and 6 alms houses were duly erected in 1678 in Salter Gate, by his son-in-law Charles Scrimshire, as the inscription in the centre of the buildings attests. It was inherited by Taylor's daughter and sole-heiress Esther Taylor, who married Sir Charles Scrimshire of Norbury in Staffordshire, Sheriff of Derbyshire in 1698. It was then acquired in 1701, with Durant Hall, by Thomas Gladwin, a member of the Gladwin family of Tupton Hall and descended via his co-heiress to the Clarke family and thence to the Cox family, and in 1746 was sold, with Durant Hall, and with the manor and lordship of Tapton, by William Coxe to Adam Slater of Chesterfield, apothecary.

== Tapton House and Castle ==
Tapton House is a large gentleman's residence, built in the Georgian Style of Red brick, located in the woods on Tapton Hill looking down on the Town of Chesterfield. Tapton House was once the home of English mechanical engineer George Stephenson who built the first public railway line in the world to use steam locomotives. In 1837 he arrived in Chesterfield, to undertake the construction of the Derby to Leeds railway (North Midland Line). As work continued George Stephenson, took up residence there. The House was bequeathed to the borough of Chesterfield on his death.

It was then converted into a school. In 1931, the first pupils passed through its doors as Tapton House Central Selective School. The school continued until 1993.

Tapton House grounds are now used as the Tapton Park Innovation Centre which is open for free use to the general public. The House itself was sold to a developer in 2023 having been empty for a number of years. It was previously used by Chesterfield College as the Higher Education Campus for Chesterfield College.
