= Thomas Gladwin (sheriff) =

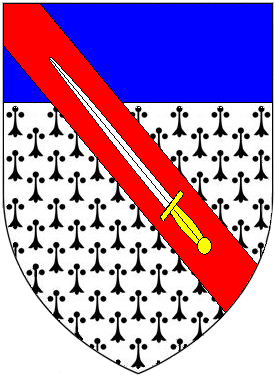
Arms of Gladwin: Ermine, a chief azure over all a bend gules charged with a sword argent hilt and pomel or. Granted by the College of Arms in 1660

Thomas Gladwin (fl. 1668) of Tupton Hall, in the parish of Wingerworth near Chesterfield, Derbyshire, was Sheriff of Derbyshire in 1668.

One of his descendants was General Henry Gladwin (1729/30-1791), a British army officer in colonial America and the British commander at the Siege of Fort Detroit during Pontiac's Rebellion. Another of his descendants was Thomas Gladwin who in 1710 resided at Durant Hall.

== Lands acquired ==
- Moniash, an estate rich in lead mines. In 1646 he acquired 2/3 of the manor of Moniash (or Monyash), near Bakewell, from John Shallcross. Two of Gladwin's granddaughters and coheiresses married as follows: Barbara Gladwin, a daughter and co-heiress of Thomas Gladwin of Durant Hall, married before 1719 to Sir Talbot Clerke, 4th Baronet (d.1723/4) of Launde Abbey, Leicestershire, to whom she brought Durant Hall, at which Sir Talbot Clerke died, also a moiety of Moniash. She survived her husband and remarried to John Monk Morgan of Monmouthshire Her sister and co-heiress Sarah Gladwin, daughter and co-heiress of Thomas Gladwin, married Dr. Henry Bourne, bachelor of physic, of Spital, who inherited a moiety of Moniash.
- Tapton. At some time he purchased the manor of Tapton, in the parish of Chesterfield, from Sir Charles Scrimshire. Tapton descended to the Cox family, who had married one of the co-heiresseses of Gladwin. In 1746 the manor of Tapton and Durant Hall were sold by Dr. William Cox and Martha his wife to Adam Slater of Chesterfield, who rebuilt Durant Hall, in 1817 the property and residence of his son, Adam Barker Slater, Esq. Tapton Hall in 1817 was a farm-house.
- Edelstowe Hall, within the parish of Ashover, in the hundred of Scarsdale and deanery of Chesterfield, about four miles from Matlock, and six miles south-west of Chesterfield. It appears to have served as the manor house of Ashover manor. It was purchased in the 17th century by Gladwin. One of Thomas Gladwin's co-heiresses married Dr. Henry Bourne of the Spital, near Chesterfield, to whose descendants it descended. It was sold in 1808 by the widow of the Rev. John Bourne, and her daughters, to John Milnes of Ashover, the proprietor in 1817, when it was occupied as a farm-house.

== Sources ==
- Harleian Publication no. 38, 1895, Familiae Minorum Gentium ("Families of the Minor Gentry"), pp.616-618, pedigree of Gladwin
- Moore, Charles, The Gladwin Manuscripts with an Introduction and a Sketch of the Conspiracy of Pontiac, Lansing, Michigan, 1897
