= Gladwin =

Gladwin may refer to:

== Places in the United States ==
- Gladwin, Michigan
- Gladwin Township, Michigan
- Gladwin County, Michigan
- Gladwin, West Virginia

== People ==
Given name:

- Gladwin Hill (1914–1992), American journalist
- Gladwin Kotelawala, Sri Lankan Sinhala businessman and politician

Surname:

- Gladwin (surname), a surname (including a list of people with the name)

== See also ==
- Stinking Gladwin or Gladwin iris, Iris foetidissima
- Gladwyn
