= Tupton Hall =

Former mansion in North East Derbyshire, England

Coordinates: 53.18224°N 1.40951°W

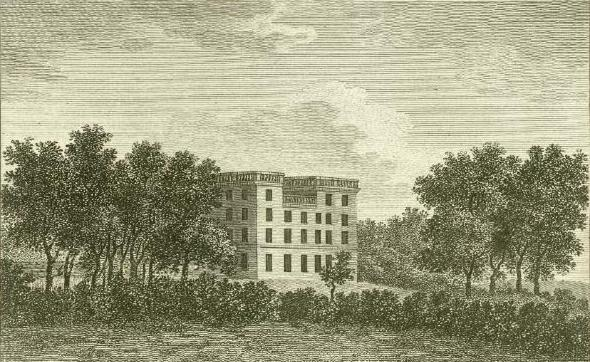
Tupton Hall, Wingerworth, Derbyshire. Engraving by Sparrow, c. 1800

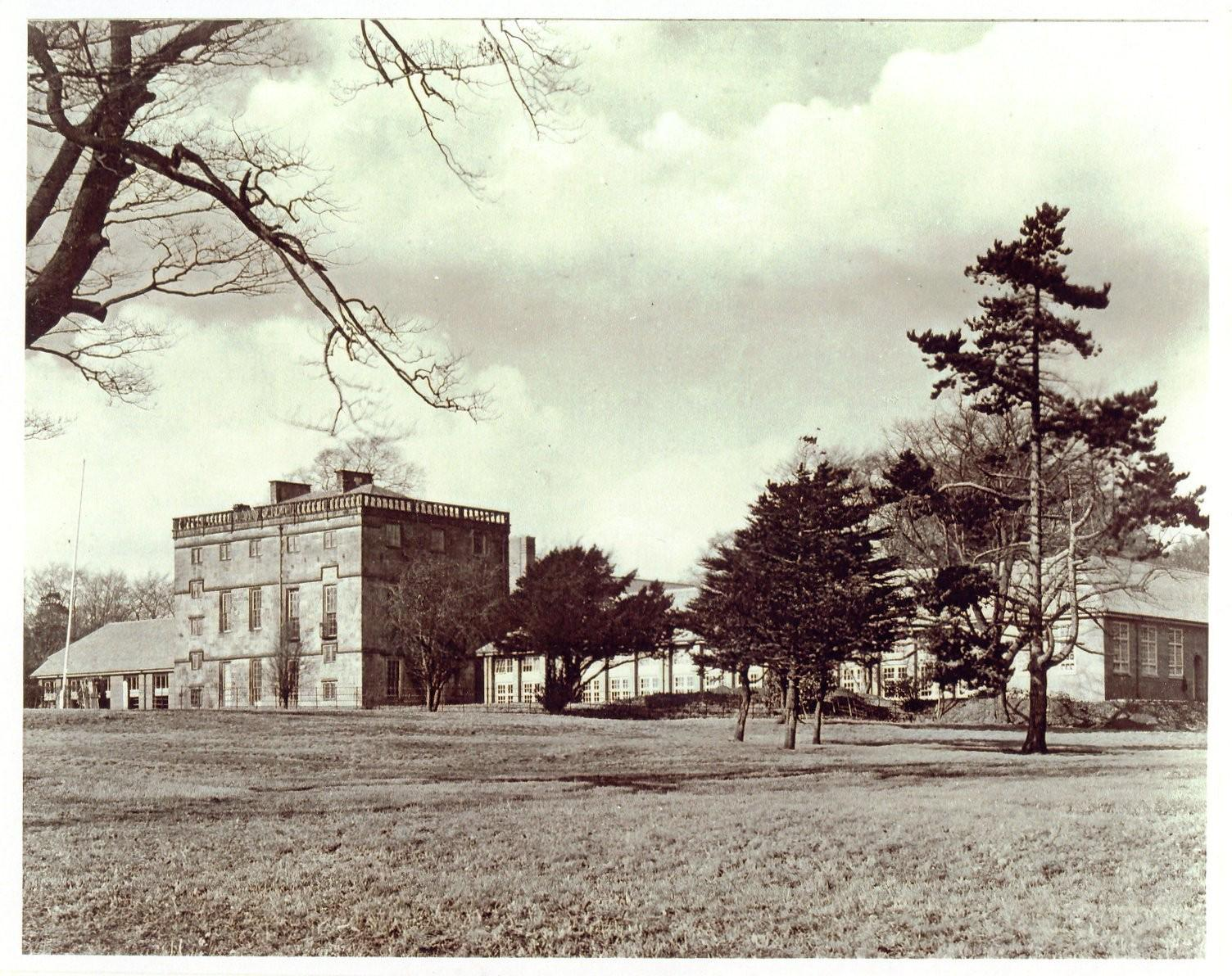
Tupton Hall photographed between 1929 and 1938

Tupton Hall was a former mansion, in Tupton, near Wingerworth in North East Derbyshire, 4.5 miles (7 km) south of Chesterfield. Since its demolition following a fire in 1938 it has been the site of Tupton Hall School, a secondary comprehensive school.

== History ==
Tupton Hall was built in 1611 by the Gladwin family and was extended in 1670. It was the home of Thomas Gladwin, Sheriff of Derbyshire in 1667/8. Thomas's eldest son and heir was Lemuel Gladwin, whose eventual heiress in the female line married a Mr Lord, whose descendants inherited the estate and made it their residence. His grandson was William Allwood Lord, Esq., who in 1817 was seated at Tupton Hall.

One of the Lord family owners, a wealthy Chesterfield miller (after which family Lordsmill Street, Chesterfield was named) was robbed by a masked highwayman. He suspected his own coachman of having been the robber, but his other staff supported his alibi that he had been in the house at the time of the crime. Nevertheless, Lord had him tried, convicted and hanged. Before his execution the coachman laid a curse on the family and predicted "disaster upon disaster would follow".

Shortly before 1893 the family sold the estate and at that time a distant cousin Rev. Henry Gladwin Jebb, descended in the female line from Major-General Henry Gladwin (d.1791), purchased ten Gladwin family portraits formerly hanging in Tupton Hall, including one of Thomas Gladwin dated 1672, and some family silver-plate also dated 1672.

In 1929 Derbyshire Education Committee purchased Tupton Hall and its 52-acre park. In 1938 the house was destroyed in a fire, soon after an ornamental plaster ceiling by Robert Adam was refurbished, and the remains were demolished soon after. Modern school buildings were then built on the site.

== Sources ==
- Moore, Charles, The Gladwin Manuscripts with an Introduction and a Sketch of the Conspiracy of Pontiac, Lansing, Michigan, 1897
- A History of Tupton Hall
