= Battle of Point Pelee =

Battle during Pontiac's War

Coordinates: 41.950°N 82.514°W

- Part of Pontiac's War
Date	May 28, 1763
Location	Point Pelee, Canada
Result	Native victory

Belligerents
British Regulars	Wyandot Warriors

Commanders and leaders
Lieutenant Abraham Cuyler	Unknown

Strength
98 troops, 20 boats	Over 200

Casualties and losses
61 men, 18 boats lost (1 later recaptured)	Light

The Battle of Point Pelee was a military engagement in 1763 during Pontiac's Rebellion.

== Background ==
Pontiac's first nation warriors surrounded Fort Detroit, besieging the British forces inside. On May 28, a supply convoy commanded by Lieutenant Abraham Cuyler stopped at Point Pelee on its way to Detroit. Unaware of the ongoing siege, Cuyler and his men made camp without taking extra security precautions.

== Battle ==
The following morning, about 200 Natives attacked, killing or capturing 61 of the 96 men of Cuyler's expedition.

== Aftermath ==
Those who escaped made their way to Fort Sandusky, but found it destroyed, and so they returned to Fort Niagara. The first nations took their captives to Detroit, where they were tortured and mutilated. The bodies were then tossed into the river to float by Fort Detroit, which undermined morale in the fort.
