= Wasson =

Wasson (c. 1730 – c. 1790s) was an Ojibwa chief during the siege of Fort Detroit in Pontiac's War.

Wasson led around 200 warriors, who joined Pontiac's forces on May 31, 1763, remaining as part of the siege until it was abandoned in the autumn. On July 4, 1763, Wasson killed captive Captain Donald Campbell, in revenge for the death of his nephew.

From the following year until at least 1776, Wasson participated in a series of peace conferences, and was the primary native speaker at John Bradstreet's peace conference in September 1764. An Ojibwa chief of the same name was also involved in negotiations over land in 1790, but it is not certain whether this was the same person.
