= Charlot Kaské =

Shawnee leader

Charlot Kaské (fl. 1763–1765) was a Shawnee war chief during Pontiac's War. Kaské's personal details were unusual for a Shawnee chief: he was a Catholic, his father was German (indicating mixed European-Native ancestry), and his wife was an English captive brought up among the Shawnees.

Kaské initially participated in the war, which was an effort to prevent the British from occupying the Illinois Country, as an ally of Pontiac. As the war progressed and went badly for the American Indians, Pontiac began to negotiate with the British. Kaské remained firmly anti-British, however, and eventually left British territory by crossing the Mississippi River with other French and Indian refugees rather than accept British rule.
