= Donald Campbell (British Army officer, died 1763) =

British officer in the Royal American Regiment

- Died: 4 July 1763
- Allegiance: Great Britain
- Conflicts: Pontiac's War; Siege of Fort Detroit

Donald Campbell (died 4 July 1763) was a British officer in the Royal American Regiment killed during the Siege of Fort Detroit in Pontiac's War. He was taken prisoner during a flag of truce, and later killed and dismembered by Ojibwa chief Wasson, who ate his heart. His remains were thrown into the river and were then picked up and buried at Fort Detroit.
