= Neolin =

Delaware religious leader

Neolin (Delaware: Neolënt, transl. "He who has been seen"; fl. 1761-1763) was a prophet of the Lenape from the village of Muskingum in what is now Ohio, United States. His exact dates of birth and death are unknown.

Inspired by a religious vision in 1761, Neolin proclaimed that Native Americans needed to reject the goods and lifestyles of the European settlers and return to a more traditional lifestyle, specifically by rejecting alcohol, materialism, and polygamy. Neolin's message was a direct inspiration for Pontiac's War.

== Biography ==
In 1761, Neolin went through a period of fasting, incantation and dreaming, during which he claimed to have been visited by the Master of Life (Keesh-she'-la-mil'-lang-up, or "being that thought us into being"). In his vision, Neolin was called to visit the Master of Life. He prepared as if for a hunt. His journey led him along a path which eventually forked into 3 roads. Neolin sheltered at the fork as night fell, where he noticed "the three roads became all the brighter the darker it grew, a thing that surprised him to a point of fear". At sunrise, Neolin set out upon the most expansive of the three roads, where he "suddenly saw a great fire coming out of the earth". He returned to the crossroads and picked a second road, which again led to a pillar of fire. Returning again to the fork, Neolin picked the third road, which led him to "what appeared to be a mountain of marvelous whiteness, and he stopped, overcome with astonishment". While at the mountain, he encountered a beautiful woman who explained that he must strip naked and cleanse himself in the nearby river in order to be allowed to visit the Master of Life. After doing so, the woman told him that "he must use only his left hand and his left foot in the ascent". Neolin did as he was told and arrived at a village at the top of the mountain, naked and tired from the ascent. A voice told him that he may enter the village because he had cleansed himself in the river. At the gate, he was greeted by a man dressed in all white who led him to the Master of Life. The Master of Life took Neolin's hand, gave him a "hat all bordered with gold," and said, "I am He who hath created the heavens and the earth, the trees, lakes, rivers, all men, and all thou seest and hath seen upon the earth. Because I love you, ye must do what I say and love, and not do what I hate". The Master of Life told Neolin that He was displeased with his people's "addiction to the white man's alcohol, and deplored Indian polygamy, sexual promiscuity, witchcraft, and strife". Further, the Indians' greatest offense was tolerating the European settlers on their lands. The Master of Life promised to restore the lands with game and prosperity if the Indians returned to monogamous sexuality, lived by the bow and arrow, dressed themselves in animal skins, stopped drinking alcohol, and rejected "further European incursions".

In 1762, Neolin claimed to receive a prayer from the Master of Life to be said every morning and evening. Neolin's greatest work was the "Great Book of Writing", a chart in which he mapped the path a soul must take to get to heaven. This description of the 'path to happiness' was portrayed by Neolin on a diagram, inscribed on a deer hide. The diagram "drew a path from earth to heaven ascending to happiness". Each path was blocked by 'strokes' which represented the vices brought by the Europeans. To reach happiness, an individual would need to follow the narrow path on the diagram and avoid each of these vices. He declared that, "to help the Indian remember these teachings, Neolin advised the hearers to obtain a copy of the Bible, which he offered to reproduce at the fixed rate of one buckskin or two doeskins each".

Hundreds of native people in the area later known as Ohio became disciples of Neolin. Neolin taught that Native Americans had been corrupted by European ways and needed to purify themselves by returning to their traditions and preparing for a holy war. "Drive them out," he declared of the settlers. A group of chiefs, most prominently chief Pontiac of the Odawa, gained influence by adopting Neolin's ideas and organized a confederacy of tribes in the Great Lakes region. Pontiac and his allies planned a coordinated attack against the British in the spring of 1763. Neolin rejected the uprising and called for the tribes to lay down their arms, but Pontiac's War persisted despite his appeal. The conflict was one of many Native American anti-colonial resistance movements inspired by religious leadership.

== Legacy ==
The Trout, also called Maya-Ga-Wy, was an Ottawa prophet on the scene in the early 1800s. He was noted for having carried on the legacy of Neolin and Pontiac, advocating the return to traditional ways as a means of combating European domination. His beliefs went further, not only condemning alcohol and the fur trade with whites, but also the consumption of bread ("food of the Whites") and the wearing of hats.

Neolin's teachings, as adopted by Pontiac, affected the policy "of nearly twenty tribes from Lake Ontario to the Mississippi, including among them the Ojibwa, Ottawa, Potawatomi, Seneca, Huron, Miami, Shawnee, and Delaware." Pontiac was known to use "Neolin's message as a slogan ... to attract warriors" for the military movement on Detroit".

Historians have speculated that Neolin's prophecy was influenced by his exposure to Christianity by European settlers. Many aspects of Neolin's vision seem to borrow from Christian mythology, including the pillars of fire, diverging roads, ascension to heaven, the voice of God, and the promise of a halo. Most significantly, Neolin's story mirrors the Book of Exodus, in which Moses receives the Ten Commandments atop Mount Sinai and delivers them to the Israelites. Neolin's message also closely reflects the Christian value of self-control as a virtue in the rejection of sin.

== See also ==
- Tenskwatawa
- Native American temperance activists
- Po'pay, Native American prophet and leader of the 1680 Pueblo Revolt
