= Chris Gladwin (engineer) =

American inventor and computer engineer

- Born: 1964
- Education: Massachusetts Institute of Technology (BS)
- Occupations: Technology entrepreneur, inventor, computer engineer
- Years active: 1996 - Present
- Known for: Cleversafe
- Website: www.ocient.com

Chris Gladwin is an American inventor, computer engineer and technology entrepreneur, who has founded or co-founded a series of tech-related companies including MusicNow, Cleversafe and Ocient.

== Biography ==
Chris Gladwin was brought up to a middle-class family of medical professionals in the suburbs of Columbus, Ohio. Gladwin attended Upper Arlington High School in Columbus, Ohio and received a B.S. degree in mechanical engineering from Massachusetts Institute of Technology in 1986.

== Entrepreneurship ==
Gladwin started his career as emerging technologies manager at Martin Marietta, a defense contractor which in 1995 merged with Lockheed Corporation. He later created the first "workgroup storage server" while working for Zenith Data Systems. In June 1996, Gladwin founded Cruise Technologies, a developer and maker of wireless tablet computers. The company was later acquired by NEC Corporation of America. MusicNow, (formerly FullAudio), founded in 1999, was among the first internet music firms to launch a music subscription business with both composition and recording licenses from major music labels including EMI, Sony/BMG, Universal Music Group, and the Warner Music Group. The company reached 100,000 customers before being sold to Circuit City. Details of the sale were not disclosed.

In 2016, Gladwin and Jeremie Bacon co-founded The Forge: Lemont Quarries, a 300-acre outdoor adventure park located 22 miles from Chicago. A number of sources describe the park as "the largest in North America with hundreds of possible routes". The park opened on July 17, 2020 in the midst of the coronavirus quarantine.

=== Cleversafe ===
Gladwin formed his next technology startup company, Chicago-based, Cleversafe, an object storage software and systems developer, which he founded in 2004 and served as CEO and President up through 2013 when he moved into a Chief Innovation role through to the company's sale to IBM in 2015. The company was originally based in IIT's technology incubator. The initial funding was provided by OCA Ventures. In 2011, it was also supported by In-Q-Tel, a venture capital firm related to the Central Intelligence Agency

In November 2015, Cleversafe was acquired by IBM for $1.3 billion and became a part of its IBM Cloud Object Storage division. The offering was originally introduced by Cleversafe. Cleversafe sold an object storage system, which it called the Dispersed Storage Network or dsNet. As Jim Comfort, a general manager of IBM Cloud, admitted: "...the object storage offered by Cleversafe represented a gap in IBM's portfolio." IBM has since rebranded the company's products as IBM Cloud Object Storage.

=== Ocient ===
Ocient was co-founded in 2016 by Chris Gladwin, George Kondiles and Joe Jablonski, who was on Cleversafe's technical advisory board. In June 2020, Ocient raised additional $15 million with the help of OCA Ventures and In-Q-Tel.

=== Patents and awards ===
He is the inventor of more than 280 issued patents. He has also been the recipient of at least 16 industry awards for his work including the 2017 Peter Lisagor Award for best podcast single episode, "Cleversafe and the whale (How to survive being right)".

== Philanthropy ==
In 2015, Gladwin donated $7.6 million to Illinois Institute of Technology with the main purpose of developing a computer science program in Chicago. He also sits on the board of trustees of the institution. He serves as co-chair of P33, a technology nonprofit founded to bolster Chicago's high-tech industry, and is on the board of a number of other organizations including SmartBet Charities and the Chicago Innovation Awards. In 2020, Gladwin helped to create and accomplish the concept for launching Illinois Tech College of Computing for further development of Chicago's tech industry. The college launched in March 2020, and classes began in June 2020.

== See also ==
- List of mechanical engineers
