= Gladwyn =

Gladwyn is a given name which may refer to:

People:

- Gladwyn Bush (1914-2003), folk painter from the Cayman Islands
- Gladwyn M. Childs (1896–1975), American minister, missionary and anthropologist
- Gladwyn Jebb (1900-1996), British civil servant, diplomat, politician and Acting Secretary-General of the United Nations (1945-1946)
- Gladwyn Kingsley Noble (1894–1940), American zoologist

== See also ==
- Baron Gladwyn, a title in the Peerage of the United Kingdom
- Gladwin (surname), a surname from which the given name is derived
- Gladwyn, New Brunswick, Canada, a community served by New Brunswick Route 390
- Gladwyn, an 18th-century schooner associated with the Navy Island Royal Naval Shipyard, Ontario (in present-day Canada)
