= Crown fortress =

Crown fortress is a term still sometimes used for any fortress or castle that currently or historically belonged to the British Crown for military purposes (as opposed to Royal Castles, which were typically used as palaces).

== Historical context ==
Over the centuries, various types of Crown fortresses emerged. The oldest may be those built across England after the Norman Conquest. These are motte-and-bailey castles, many of which, though becoming private property of knights or aristocracy, began at the behest of the English king to help subjugate and control Norman-occupied England, and later Wales.

However, some of these motte and bailey castles were not handed over to the aristocracy, either because they were favoured as royal residences, or the monarch found it militarily useful to keep some. It is unlikely that much of a distinction was made between the two, but such castles were always useful for defence, as well as for providing a military presence in potentially rebellious areas, where perhaps the ambitions of the aristocracy meant they couldn't be entirely trusted. A fortified stronghold was also useful for tax collection and dispensing justice. These structures, like many motte and bailey castles, were rebuilt in stone. As time went on and the shires were established, many motte and bailey castles became the seats of sheriffs, as a result making the towns or cities around them the county towns, and latterly many came to house the Shire Halls, and county councils. Such examples survive (although not necessarily still in use) at Chester Castle, Exeter, Lancaster Castle, Leicester Castle, Lincoln Castle, Norwich Castle, Shrewsbury Castle, York Castle.

During the turbulent history of medieval England, many aristocratic strongholds were seized in the name of The Crown, following changes in regime or internal disputes that left certain members of the aristocracy out of favour with the Monarch. This often led to confiscation of property, including castles. Also, much like today, the Crown confiscated some for non-payment of taxes or duties. As not all confiscated castles were desired for Royal use, many were simply designated "Crown Fortress", whether used as military garrisons or not. Many were given away as gifts or rewards, or sold off, rather than left to crumble away. Examples of these include Bolsover Castle and Brancepeth Castle.

During and after the reign of Henry VIII, the King and his adherents commissioned many new Crown fortresses. This was partly because many medieval castles could not cope with the increasing use of cannon in warfare. Also, with the long term threats of the French, and later the Spanish, they were felt particularly necessary on the southern coast of England. Examples of these include Deal Castle, Pendennis Castle, St Mawes Castle, and Walmer Castle.

During the English Civil War, many Crown Fortresses fell prey to the Parliamentarian forces, and due to their strategic value were greatly fought for. As many had been under the control of commanders appointed by The Crown, many naturally supported the King, and their knowledge of the fortresses they commanded made their defence easy and difficult for Parliamentarian forces to seize them. Also often, it did not take much for Royalist forces to retake them, and a lot for the Parliamentarian forces to take them back. As a result, Oliver Cromwell (who by then commanded the Parliamentarian forces) came to resent the large cost in forces often necessary to retake these castles. Subsequently, he ordered many re-captured castles demolished—two examples being Bridgnorth Castle and Pontefract Castle.

Following the Glorious Revolution of 1689 and the new threat posed by the Jacobites, numerous fortresses were built along the Scottish coastline, both to help control the Jacobite Highlanders and to help prevent the French from landing troops, supplies or insurgents. One example is Fort William.

During the Napoleonic Wars, many small Martello towers were constructed around the coastline of the British Isles. Some of the last Crown fortresses were built in the 19th century—such as Coalhouse Fort in the Thames Estuary, built because of a perceived threat from the French Navy under Napoleon III. An even more historically recent fortress is Maunsell Sea Fort, built in the Thames Estuary during World War II.

== Contemporary context ==
Today, as changing warfare tactics have made traditional fortresses obsolete, the term "Crown Fortress" is rarely used, except in describing the use and ownership of such structures. Today many Crown Fortresses survive, even in state hands, although not necessarily as defensive structures—such as Fort George in the Scottish Highlands.
