= The Forge: Lemont Quarries Adventure Park =

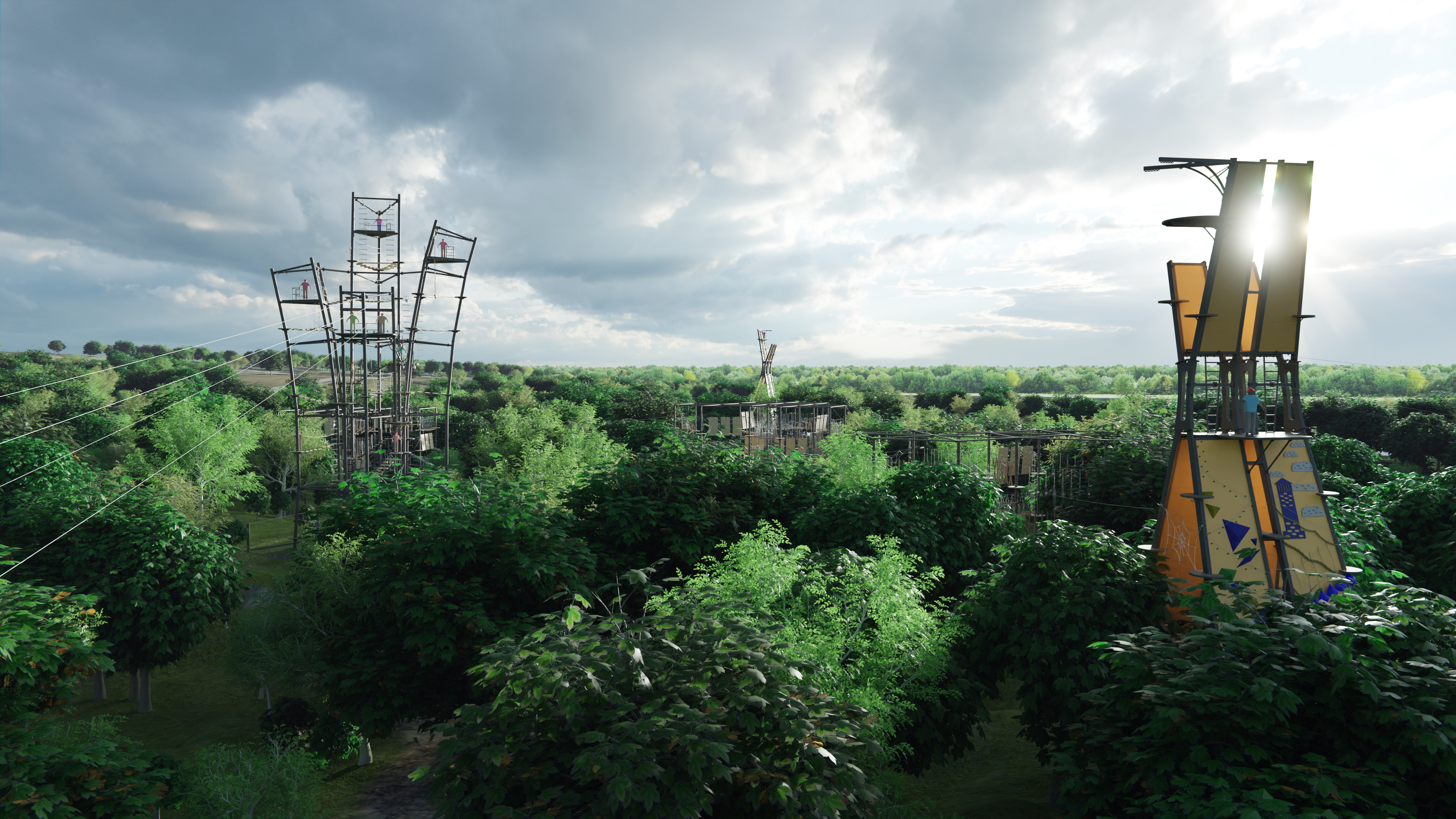
- A computer rendering
- Interactive map of The Forge: Lemont Quarries Adventure Park
- Location: 1001 Main St, Lemont, Illinois, United States
- Coordinates: 41°40′57″N 87°58′48″W
- Opened: July, 2020
- Slogan: Exhilarate, Educate, and Entertain
- Operating season: year-round
- Website: Official website

The Forge: Lemont Quarries Adventure Park is an adventure park that opened July 17, 2020 in Lemont, Illinois, a suburb of Chicago. It is a public-private partnership with the Village of Lemont and Lemont Township.

Covering approximately 300 acres (120 ha), it features ziplines, ropes courses, climbing towers and walls, bouldering areas, fishing, paddleboating, kayaking, mountain biking and hiking trails and other outdoor activities. The ropes course will be the tallest in North America, at over 120 ft (37 m). It also has adventure dining, a beer garden, an event venue, and summer camps.

The park was built on disused industrial land and flooded former Lemont yellow dolomite quarries straddling the Illinois and Michigan Canal National Heritage Area, and abutting the Chicago Sanitary and Ship Canal. It is named after the Forge Quarry and uses it, the Great Lakes Quarries, and the I&M Canal as water features. It was originally scheduled to open on May 25, with a grand opening scheduled for June 27, 2020, but due to the COVID-19 pandemic this was pushed back to July 2020.
