= Chris Gladwin (cricketer) =

English cricketer (born 1962)

Personal information
- Full name: Christopher Gladwin
- Born: 10 May 1962; East Ham, Essex
- Batting: Left-handed
- Bowling: Right arm medium
- Role: Batsman

Domestic team information
- Years: Team
- 1981–1987: Essex
- 1989: Derbyshire
- 1988–1990: Suffolk

Career statistics
Competition	First-class	List A
Matches	71	52
Runs scored	3,080	867
Batting average	26.78	17.34
100s/50s	1/18	0/3
Top score	162	75
Balls bowled	126	78
Wickets	0	3
Bowling average	–	23.33
5 wickets in innings	–	0
10 wickets in match	–	0
Best bowling	–	3/64
Catches/stumpings	33/–	9/–
- Source: CricketArchive, 30 October 2022

Christopher Gladwin (born 10 May 1962) is a retired English first-class cricketer who played for Essex County Cricket Club from 1981 to 1987, and for Derbyshire County Cricket Club in 1989. He also played for Suffolk County Cricket Club in List A matches from 1988 to 1990. He was born at East Ham, Essex.

Gladwin, a left-handed opening batsman, played in 71 first-class and 52 limited overs matches. In first-class cricket, he scored 3,080 career runs at an average of 26.78 runs per completed innings with a highest score of 162, his only century; he scored 18 half-centuries. He was an occasional right arm medium pace bowler. As a fielder, he held 33 career catches.

== Playing career ==
=== 1977–1983 ===
Chris Gladwin was born on 10 May 1962 at East Ham, Essex. He is a left-handed opening batsman and an occasional right arm medium pace bowler. He played for the English Schools Cricket Association Under-15 team in 1977 and then joined Essex for the 1978 season.

Gladwin made his Second XI Championship debut, aged sixteen, on 19–20 June 1978 in a two-day match for Essex Second XI against Northamptonshire Second XI at the County Ground, Northampton. Essex Second XI batted first and Gladwin scored 55 not out in a total of 264/6 declared. He did not bat in the second innings and the match was drawn.

Between January 1980 and September 1981, Gladwin represented the England Young Cricketers four times in Youth Test matches against West Indies Young Cricketers and India Young Cricketers. His best performance was an innings of 86.

On 18–21 July 1981, Gladwin made his first-class debut for Essex in a County Championship match against Lancashire at Southchurch Park in Southend-on-Sea. Aged nineteen, he opened the first innings with Brian Hardie and shared in a first wicket partnership of 129 before he was caught by David Hughes off Jack Simmons for 53. Essex made 308 (Hardie 129) and dismissed Lancashire for 111. Following on, Lancashire made 245/7 to draw the match. Despite his good debut, Gladwin did not play for the first team again in 1981. Wisden Cricketers' Almanack commented that Gladwin "caught the eye with some pleasant strokes" during his opening stand with Hardie. Gladwin did not return to the first team until 1983 when, aged 21, he played in nine matches to help Essex win their second County Championship title.

=== 1984–1990 ===
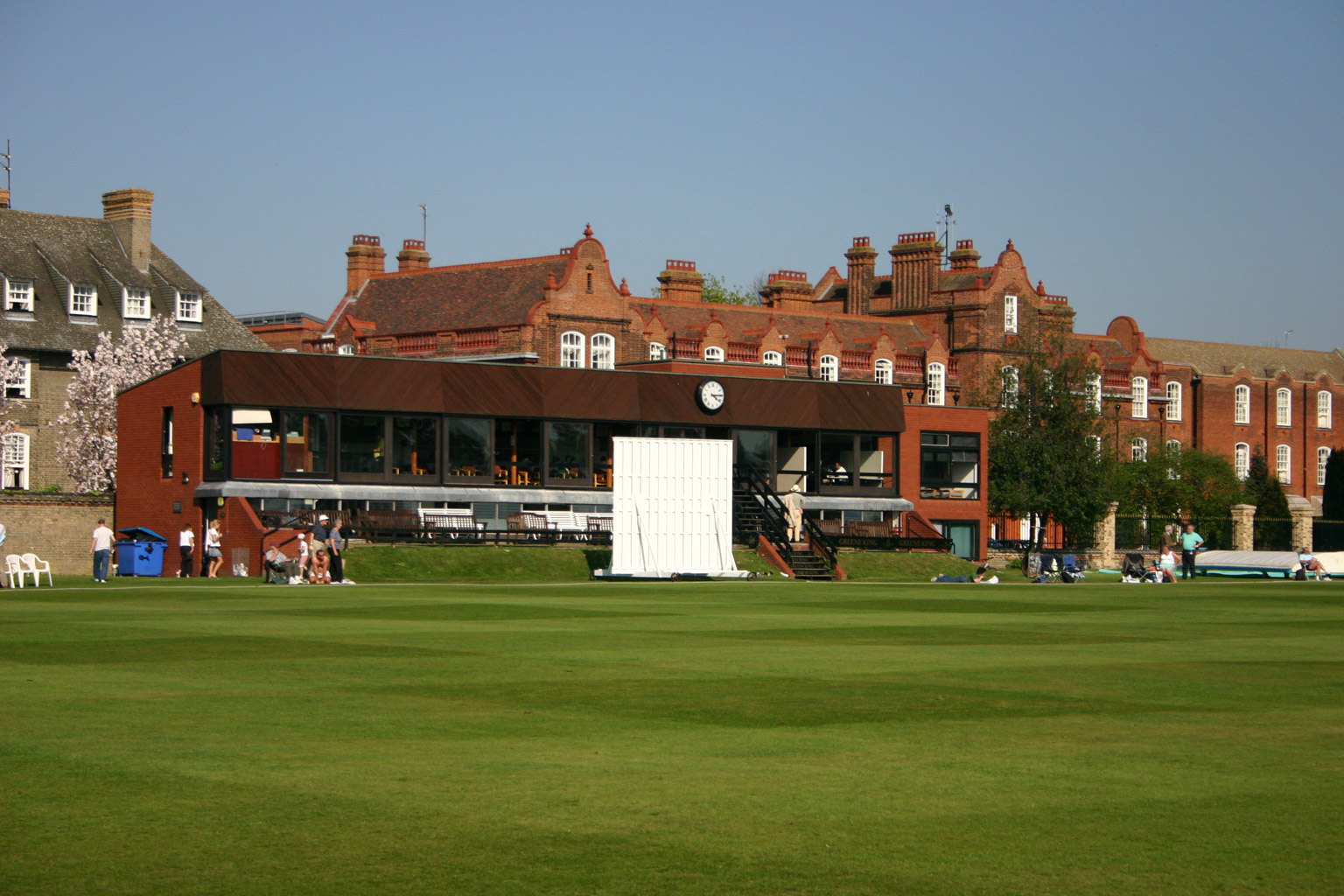
Fenner's in Cambridge, where Chris Gladwin made his highest career score.

In 1984, Gladwin was a regular choice as Essex opening batsman when he played in 26 matches. This was his best season as he scored 1,396 runs at 33.23 and made one century and nine half-centuries. The century was his career highest score of 162 for Essex against Cambridge University in the season opener at Fenner's. Essex won the toss and batted first. Gladwin opened with Graham Gooch and they amassed a first wicket partnership of 145 before Gooch was out for 89. Gladwin then shared a second wicket partnership of 154 with Keith Fletcher. After Fletcher was out for 59, Gladwin went on to make 162 before he was the third wicket to fall at 326/3. Essex eventually declared on 463/4 but Cambridge managed to draw the match. Gladwin played for Essex against a strong West Indian touring team in 1984. He opened both innings with Gooch and made scores of 8 and 26. He also took a catch to dismiss West Indies captain Viv Richards, who had made 60. The match, played on the County Ground, Chelmsford, ended as a draw.

Gladwin was awarded his Essex county cap in 1984. However, his first-class career fell away after that. He made only thirteen appearances in 1985 and was a reserve player in 1986 and 1987, his last two seasons at Essex. Even so, he was part of three County Championship title-winning teams in each of the 1983, 1984 and 1986 seasons. In 1988, Gladwin joined Suffolk where he played in the Minor Counties Championship and in List A limited overs matches. He played for Derbyshire in 1989, his last season as a first-class player, making four appearances. His last season with Suffolk was 1990 and he then retired from county cricket.

== Coaching ==
Gladwin has continued to be involved in Essex club cricket on the coaching side of the sport. He has been active with the Old Brentwoods, Witham, Wickford, Westcliff, and Hornchurch clubs, initially as a player-coach but by 2015 he had become a full-time coach with Westcliff-on-Sea Cricket Club.

== Sources ==
- Marshall, Ian, ed. (2018). Playfair Cricket Annual. London: Headline. ISBN 978-14-72249-82-1.
- Woodcock, John, ed. (1982). Wisden Cricketers' Almanack. London: Queen Anne Press. ISBN 978-03-56085-90-6.
