= Pontiac's War =

1763 conflict by indigenous Native Americans against the British in Canada

- Part of the American Indian Wars and a continuation of the French and Indian War
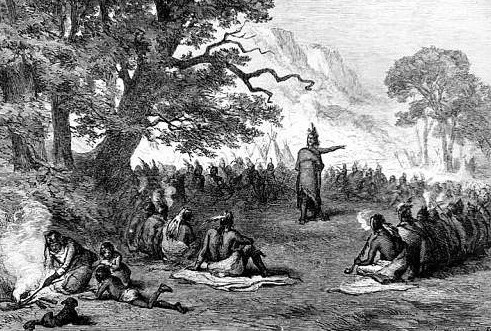
- In a famous council on April 27, 1763, Pontiac urged listeners to rise up against the British (19th century engraving by Alfred Bobbett)
Date	April 27, 1763 – July 25, 1766 (3 years, 2 months and 4 weeks)
Location	Great Lakes region of North America
Result	see Aftermath
Territorial changes	Portage around Niagara Falls ceded by Senecas to the British

Belligerents
(Kingdom of Great Britain) British Empire	Native American Coalition: Odawa Anishinaabek; Potawatomi Anishinaabek; Ojibwe Anishinaabek; Mingo people; Seneca people; Wyandot people; Miami people; Kickapoo people; Illinois people; Quapaw people Historically known as Arkansas

Commanders and leaders
Jeffery Amherst; Henry Bouquet; Thomas Gage; Robert Rogers; Abraham Cuyler; Henry Gladwin; William Trent; John Stedman; Donald Campbell †; George Campbell †; William Fraser †; Simeon Ecuyer; James Dalyell †	Pontiac; Guyasuta; Charlot Kaské; Cornplanter; Sayenqueraghta; Wasson; Keekyuscung †; Honayewus

Strength
~3,000 soldiers	~3,500 warriors

Casualties and losses
~450 soldiers killed ~450 civilians killed ~4,000 civilians displaced	200+ warriors killed civilian casualties unknown

Pontiac's War (also known as Pontiac's Conspiracy or Pontiac's Rebellion) was launched in 1763 by a confederation of Native Americans who were dissatisfied with British rule in the Great Lakes region following the French and Indian War (1754–1763). Warriors from numerous nations joined in an effort to drive British soldiers and settlers out of the region. The war is named after Odawa leader Pontiac, the most prominent of many Indigenous leaders in the conflict.

The war began in May 1763 when Native Americans, alarmed by policies imposed by British General Jeffery Amherst, attacked a number of British forts and settlements. Nine forts were destroyed, and hundreds of colonists were killed or captured, with many more fleeing the region. Hostilities came to an end after successful British Army expeditions in 1764 led to peace negotiations over the next two years. The Natives were unable to drive away the British, but the uprising prompted the British government to modify the policies that had provoked the conflict.

Warfare on the North American frontier was brutal; the killing of prisoners, the targeting of civilians, and other atrocities were widespread. The ruthlessness of the conflict was a reflection of a growing racial divide between indigenous peoples and British colonists. The British government sought to prevent further racial violence by issuing the Royal Proclamation of 1763, which created a boundary between colonists and Natives.

== Naming the war ==
The conflict is named after its most well-known participant, the Odawa leader Pontiac. An early name for the war was the "Giyasuta and Pontiac War", "Giyasuta" being an alternate spelling for Guyasuta, an influential Seneca/Mingo leader. The war became widely known as "Pontiac's Conspiracy" after the 1851 publication of Francis Parkman's The Conspiracy of Pontiac. Parkman's book was the definitive account of the war for nearly a century and is still in print.

In the 20th century, some historians argued that Parkman exaggerated the extent of Pontiac's influence in the conflict, so it was misleading to name the war after him. Francis Jennings (1988) wrote that "Pontiac was only a local Odawa war chief in a 'resistance' involving many tribes." Alternate titles for the war have been proposed, such as "Pontiac's War for Indian Independence", the "Western Indians' Defensive War" and "The Amerindian War of 1763". Historians generally continue to use "Pontiac's War" or "Pontiac's Rebellion", with some 21st-century scholars arguing that Pontiac's importance was underestimated by 20th-century historians.

== Origins ==
You think yourselves Masters of this Country, because you have taken it from the French, who, you know, had no Right to it, as it is the Property of us Indians.

— Nimwha, Shawnee diplomat, to George Croghan, 1768

In the decades before Pontiac's War, France and Great Britain participated in a series of wars in Europe that involved the French and Indian Wars in North America. The largest of these wars was the worldwide Seven Years' War, in which France lost New France in North America to Great Britain. Most fighting in the North American theater of the war, generally called the French and Indian War in the United States, or the War of Conquest (French: Guerre de la Conquête) in French Canada, came to an end after British General Jeffery Amherst captured French Montréal in 1760.

British troops occupied forts in the Ohio Country and Great Lakes region previously garrisoned by the French. Even before the war officially ended with the Treaty of Paris (1763), the British Crown began to implement policy changes to administer its vastly expanded American territory. The French had long cultivated alliances amongst Indigenous nations; by contrast, the British post-war approach essentially treated the nations as conquered peoples. Before long, Native Americans found themselves dissatisfied with the British occupation.

=== Tribes involved ===
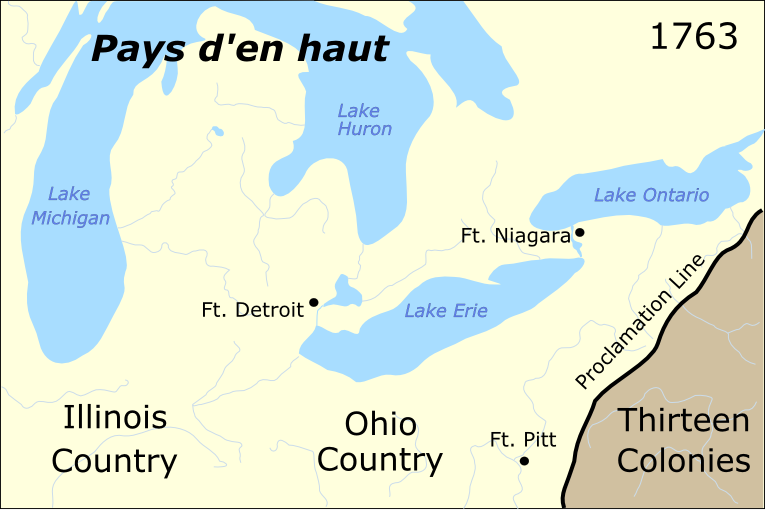
The main area of action in Pontiac's Rebellion

Indigenous people involved in Pontiac's War lived in a vaguely defined region of New France known as the pays d'en haut ("the upper country"), which was claimed by France until the Paris peace treaty of 1763. Natives of the pays d'en haut were from many different tribal nations. These tribes were linguistic or ethnic groupings of anarchic communities rather than centralized political powers; no individual chief spoke for an entire tribe, and no nations acted in unison. For example, the Odawa did not go to war as a tribe: Some Odawa leaders chose to do so, while other Odawa leaders denounced the war and stayed clear of the conflict.

The tribes of the pays d'en haut consisted of three basic groups. The first group was composed of tribes of the Great Lakes region: Odawas, Ojibwes, and Potawatomis, who spoke Algonquian languages, and Wyandot, who spoke an Iroquoian language. They had long been allied with French habitants with whom they lived, traded, and intermarried. Great Lakes Indians were alarmed to learn they were under British sovereignty after the French loss of North America. When a British garrison took possession of Fort Detroit from the French in 1760, local Indians cautioned them that "this country was given by God to the Indians." When the first Englishman reached Fort Michilimackinac, the Ojibwe chief Minavavana reportedly told him: "Englishman, although you have conquered the French, you have not yet conquered us!"

The second group was made up of tribes from eastern Illinois Country, which included Miamis, Weas, Kickapoos, Mascoutens, and Piankashaws. Like the Great Lakes tribes, these people had a long history of close relations with the French. Throughout the war, the British were unable to project military power into the Illinois Country, which was on the remote western edge of the conflict. Thus, the Illinois tribes were the last to come to terms with the British.

The third group consisted of tribes of the Ohio Country: Delawares (Lenape), Shawnees, Wyandots, and Mingos. These people had migrated to the Ohio valley earlier in the century to escape British, French, and Haudenosaunee domination. Unlike the Great Lakes and Illinois Country tribes, Ohio tribes had no great attachment to the French regime, though they had fought as French allies in the previous war in an effort to drive away the British. They made a separate peace with the British with the understanding that the British Army would withdraw. But after the departure of the French, the British strengthened their forts rather than abandoning them, and so the Ohioans broke the peace in response.

Outside the pays d'en haut, the influential Haudenosaunee did not, as a group, participate in Pontiac's War because of their alliance with the British, known as the Covenant Chain. However, the westernmost Haudenosaunee nation, the Seneca, were disillusioned with the Covenant. As early as 1761, Senecas began to send out war messages to the Great Lakes and Ohio Country tribes, urging them to unite militarily and rise against the British occupiers.

=== Amherst's policies ===
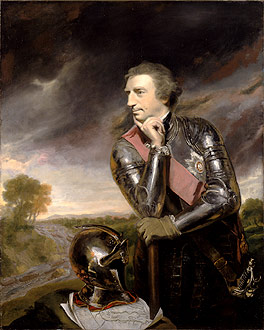
The policies of General Jeffery Amherst, a British hero of the Seven Years' War, helped to provoke Pontiac's War (Portrait of Jeffery Amherst by Joshua Reynolds, 1765).

General Jeffery Amherst, the British commander-in-chief in North America, was in charge of administering policy towards American Indians, which involved military matters and regulation of the fur trade. Amherst believed that, with France out of the picture, the Indians would have to accept British rule. He also believed the Indians were incapable of offering any serious resistance to the British Army. Therefore, of the 8,000 troops under his command in North America, only about 500 were stationed in the region where the war erupted. Amherst and officers such as Major Henry Gladwin, commander at Fort Detroit, made little effort to conceal their contempt for Indians; those involved in the uprising frequently complained that the British treated them no better than slaves or dogs.

Additional Indian resentment came from Amherst's decision in February 1761 to cut back on gifts given to the Indians. Gift giving had been an integral part of the relationship between the French and the tribes of the pays d'en haut. Following an Indian custom that carried important symbolic meaning, the French gave presents (such as guns, knives, tobacco, and clothing) to village chiefs, who distributed them to their people; this raised the chiefs' stature and so they had an incentive to maintain good relations with the Europeans. The Indians regarded material gifts as "a necessary part of diplomacy which involved accepting gifts in return for others sharing their lands." Amherst, however, considered this to be little more than bribery, especially as he was under pressure to cut expenses after the war. Many Indians regarded this change in policy as an insult and an indication the British looked upon them as conquered people rather than as allies.

New regulations were also issued to restrict the amount of ammunition and gunpowder that traders could sell to Indians. Unlike the French, Amherst did not trust the Indians, particularly after the "Cherokee Rebellion" of 1761, in which Cherokee warriors took up arms against their former British allies. The Cherokee war effort had failed due to a shortage of gunpowder; Amherst hoped future uprisings could be prevented by limiting its distribution. This created resentment and hardship because gunpowder and ammunition helped Indians provide food for their families and skins for the fur trade. Many Indians also believed the British meant to disarm them as a prelude to further conquest. Sir William Johnson, the Superintendent of the Indian Department, warned Amherst of the danger of cutting back on presents and gunpowder, to no avail.

=== Land and religion ===
Land was also an issue in the coming of Pontiac's War. While the French colonists had always been relatively few, there seemed to be no end of settlers in the British colonies. Shawnees and Lenape in the Ohio Country had been displaced by British colonists in the east, and this motivated their involvement in the war. Indians in the Great Lakes region and the Illinois Country had not been greatly affected by white settlement, although they were aware of the experiences of tribes in the east. Dowd (2002) argues that most Indians involved in Pontiac's War were not immediately threatened with displacement by white settlers, and that historians have overemphasized British colonial expansion as a cause of the war. Dowd believes that the presence, attitude, and policies of the British Army, which the Indians found threatening and insulting, were more important factors.

Also contributing to the outbreak of war was a religious awakening which swept through Indian settlements in the early 1760s. The movement was fed by discontent with the British as well as food shortages and epidemic disease. The most influential individual in this phenomenon was Neolin, known as the "Delaware Prophet", who called upon Indians to shun the trade goods, alcohol, and weapons of the colonists. Melding Christian doctrines with traditional Indian beliefs, Neolin said the Master of Life was displeased with Indians for taking up the bad habits of white men, and that the British posed a threat to their very existence. "If you suffer the English among you," said Neolin, "you are dead men. Sickness, smallpox, and their poison [alcohol] will destroy you entirely." It was a powerful message for a people whose world was being changed by forces that seemed beyond their control.

== Outbreak of war, 1763 ==
=== Planning the war ===
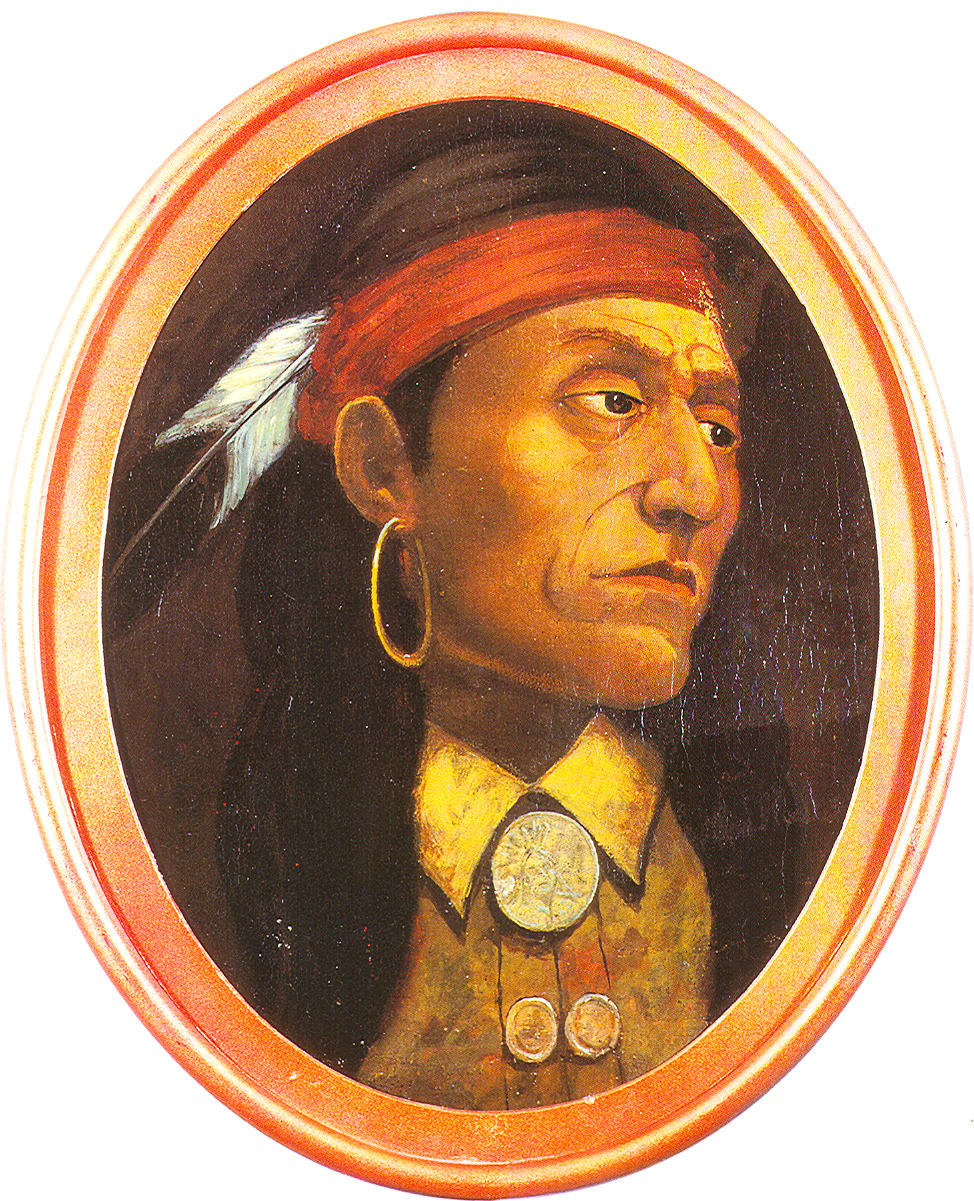
Pontiac has often been imagined by artists, as in this 19th-century painting by John Mix Stanley, but no actual portraits are known to exist.

Although fighting in Pontiac's War began in 1763, rumors reached British officials as early as 1761 that discontented American Indians were planning an attack. Senecas of the Ohio Country (Mingos) circulated messages ("war belts" made of wampum) calling for the tribes to form a confederacy and drive away the British. The Mingos, led by Guyasuta and Tahaiadoris, were concerned about being surrounded by British forts. Similar war belts originated from Detroit and the Illinois Country. The Indians were not unified, and in June 1761, natives at Detroit informed the British commander of the Seneca plot. William Johnson held a large council with the tribes at Detroit in September 1761, which provided a tenuous peace, but war belts continued to circulate. Violence finally erupted after the Indians learned in early 1763 of the imminent French cession of the pays d'en haut to the British.

The war began at Fort Detroit under the leadership of Pontiac and quickly spread throughout the region. Eight British forts were taken; others, including Fort Detroit and Fort Pitt, were unsuccessfully besieged. Francis Parkman's The Conspiracy of Pontiac portrayed these attacks as a coordinated operation planned by Pontiac. Parkman's interpretation remains well known, but later historians argued there is no clear evidence the attacks were part of a master plan or overall "conspiracy." (Note: Jacobs supported Parkman's thesis that Pontiac planned the war in advance, but objected to calling it a "conspiracy" because it suggested Indian grievances were unjustified.) Rather than being planned in advance, modern scholars believe the uprising spread as word of Pontiac's actions at Detroit traveled throughout the pays d'en haut, inspiring discontented Indians to join the revolt. The attacks on British forts were not simultaneous: most Ohio Indians did not enter the war until nearly a month after Pontiac began the siege at Detroit.

Early historians believed French colonists had secretly instigated the war by stirring up the Indians to make trouble for the British. This belief was held by British officials at the time, but subsequent historians found no evidence of official French involvement in the uprising. (Note: The rumor of French instigation arose in part because French war belts from the Seven Years' War were still in circulation.) According to Dowd (2002), "Indians sought French intervention and not the other way around." Indian leaders frequently spoke of the imminent return of French power and the revival of the Franco-Indian alliance; Pontiac even flew a French flag in his village. Indian leaders apparently hoped to inspire the French to rejoin the struggle against the British. Although some French colonists and traders supported the uprising, the war was launched by American Indians for their own objectives.

Middleton (2007) argues that Pontiac's vision, courage, persistence, and organizational abilities allowed him to activate an unprecedented coalition of Indian nations prepared to fight against the British. Tahaiadoris and Guyasuta originated the idea to gain independence for all Indians west of the Allegheny Mountains, although Pontiac appeared to embrace the idea by February 1763. At an emergency council meeting, he clarified his military support of the broad Seneca plan and worked to galvanize other tribes into the military operation he helped to lead, in direct contradiction to traditional Indian leadership and tribal structure. He achieved this coordination through the distribution of war belts, first to the northern Ojibwa and Odawa near Michilimackinac, and then to the Mingo (Seneca) on the upper Allegheny River, the Ohio Lenape (Delaware) near Fort Pitt, and the more westerly Miami, Kickapoo, Piankashaw, and Wea peoples.

=== Siege of Fort Detroit ===
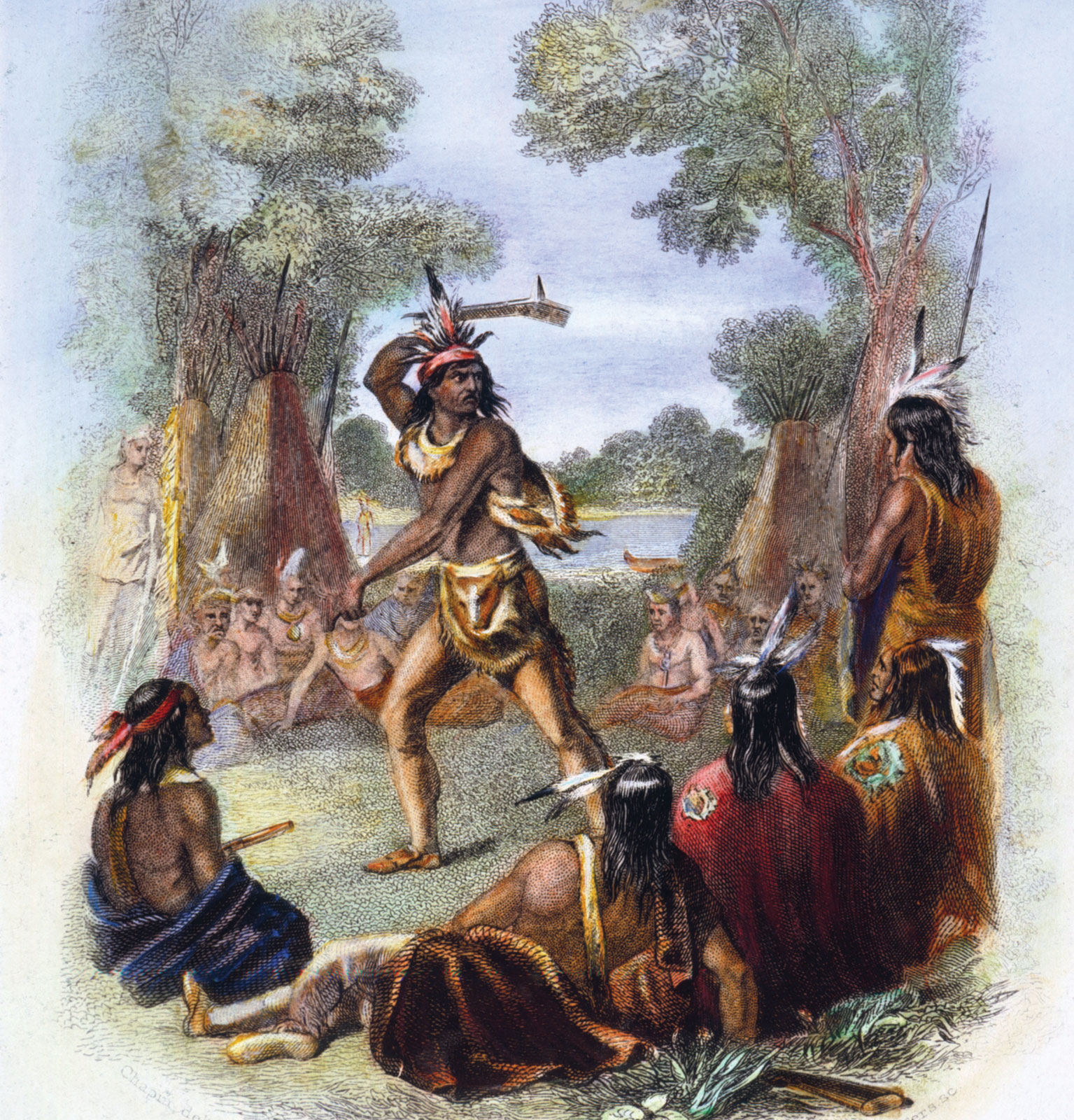
Pontiac takes up the war hatchet

Pontiac spoke at a council on the banks of the Ecorse River on April 27, 1763, about 10 miles (15 km) southwest of Detroit. Using the teachings of Neolin to inspire his listeners, Pontiac convinced a number of Odawas, Ojibwas, Potawatomis, and Wyandot to join him in an attempt to seize Fort Detroit. On May 1, he visited the fort with 50 Odawas to assess the strength of the garrison. According to a French chronicler, in a second council Pontiac proclaimed:

It is important for us, my brothers, that we exterminate from our lands this nation which seeks only to destroy us. You see as well as I that we can no longer supply our needs, as we have done from our brothers, the French.... Therefore, my brothers, we must all swear their destruction and wait no longer. Nothing prevents us; they are few in numbers, and we can accomplish it.

On May 6, a small survey party under Captain Charles Robertson was ambushed while traveling near Lake St Clair by Indians; Robertson and three men (including Sir Robert Davers, 5th Baronet) were killed; Davers' Indian slave and three others were captured. On May 7, Pontiac entered Fort Detroit with about 300 men carrying concealed weapons, hoping to take the stronghold by surprise. The British had learned of his plan, however, and were armed and ready. (Note: Major Gladwin, the fort's commander, did not reveal who warned him of Pontiac's plan; historians identify several possibilities.) His strategy foiled, Pontiac withdrew after a brief council and, two days later, laid siege to the fort. He and his allies killed British soldiers and settlers they found outside of the fort, including women and children. They ritually cannibalized one of the soldiers, as was the custom in some Great Lakes Indian cultures. The violence was directed purely at the British; French colonists who lived nearby were largely untouched. Eventually more than 900 warriors from a half-dozen tribes joined the siege.

After receiving reinforcements, the British attempted to make a surprise attack on Pontiac's encampment. Pontiac was ready and defeated them at the Battle of Bloody Run on July 31, 1763. Despite this victory, the garrison at Fort Detroit managed to hold out, and Pontiac's influence among his followers began to wane. Groups of Indians began to abandon the siege, some of them making peace with the British before departing. Pontiac lifted the siege on October 31, 1763, convinced that the French would not come to his aid at Detroit, and removed to the Maumee River where he continued his efforts to rally resistance against the British.

=== Small forts taken ===
In 1763, before other British outposts had learned of Pontiac's siege at Detroit, Indians captured five small forts in attacks between May 16 and June 2. Additional attacks occurred up until June 19.

Fort	Location	Sacking Date	Details
Fort Sandusky	Lake Erie shore	May 16	A small blockhouse was the first to be taken. It had been built in 1761 by order of General Amherst, despite the objections of local Wyandots who warned the commander they would burn it down. On May 16, 1763, a group of Wyandots gained entry under the pretense of holding a council, the same stratagem that had failed in Detroit nine days earlier. They seized the commander and killed 15 soldiers and a number of British traders, among the first of about 100 traders who were killed in the early stages of the war. They ritually scalped the dead and burned the fort to the ground, as the Wyandots had threatened a year earlier.
Fort St. Joseph	Present Niles, Michigan	May 25	Potawatomis captured the fort using the same method as at Sandusky. They seized the commander and killed most of the fifteen-man garrison.
Fort Miami	Present Fort Wayne, Indiana	May 27	The fort commander Ensign Holmes was lured out by his Miami mistress and shot dead by Miamis. His head was cut off, brought into the fort, and thrown into the corporals bed. The nine-man garrison surrendered after the fort was surrounded.
Fort Ouiatenon	Approximately 5 miles (8.0 km) west of present Lafayette, Indiana	June 1	In the Illinois Country, Weas, Kickapoos, and Mascoutens took the fort on June 1, 1763. They lured soldiers outside for a council, then took the 20-man garrison captive without bloodshed. These Indians had good relations with the British garrison, but emissaries from Pontiac had convinced them to strike. The warriors apologized to the commander for taking the fort, saying "they were Obliged to do it by the other Nations." In contrast with other forts, the Indians did not kill their captives at Ouiatenon.
Fort Michilimackinac	Present Mackinaw City, Michigan	June 4	The fifth fort to fall, it was the largest fort taken by surprise. On June 4, 1763, Ojibwas staged a game of stickball with visiting Sauks. The soldiers watched the game, as they had done on previous occasions. The Indians hit the ball through the open gate of the fort, then rushed in and seized weapons that Indian women had smuggled into the fort. They killed about 15 of the 35-man garrison in the struggle; they later tortured five more to death.
Fort Venango	Near present Franklin, Pennsylvania	June 16	Three forts in the Ohio Country were taken in a second wave of attacks in mid-June. Senecas took this fort around June 16, 1763. They killed the entire 12-man garrison, keeping the commander alive to write down the Seneca's grievances, then burned him at the stake.
Fort Le Boeuf	Present Waterford, Pennsylvania	June 18	Possibly the same Senecas that attacked Fort Venango, but most of the 12-man garrison escaped to Fort Pitt.
Fort Presque Isle	Present Erie, Pennsylvania	June 19	The eighth and final fort to fall, it was surrounded by about 250 Odawas, Ojibwas, Wyandots, and Senecas on June 19. After holding out for two days, the garrison of 30 to 60 men surrendered on the condition that they could return to Fort Pitt. The Natives agreed, but then took the soldiers captive, killing many.

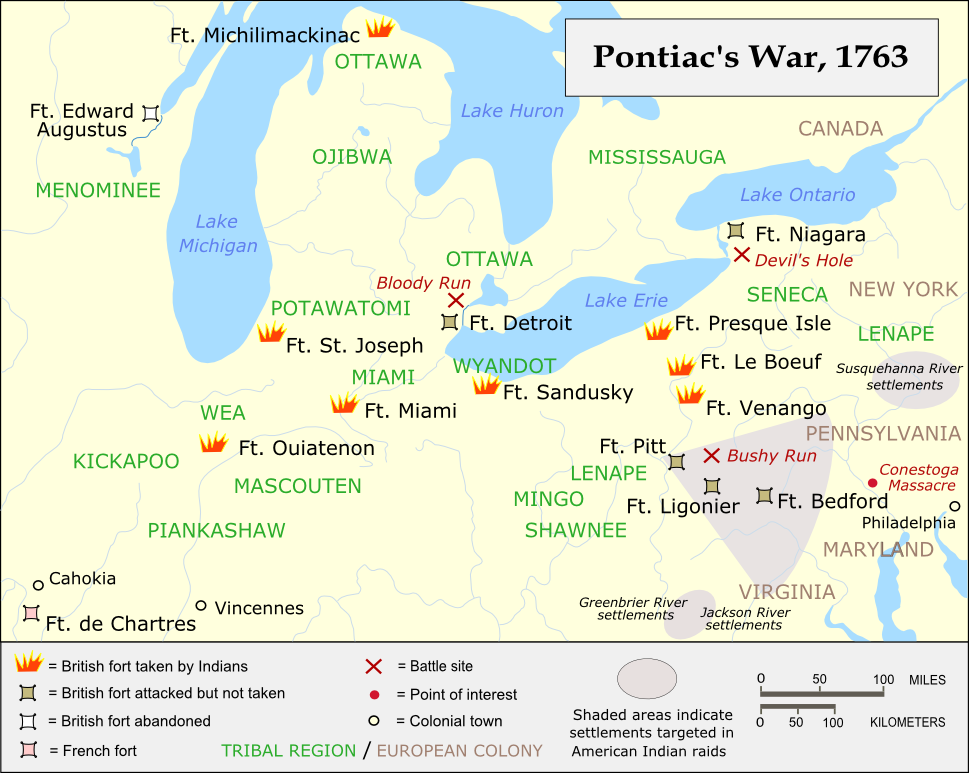
Forts and battles of Pontiac's War

=== Siege of Fort Pitt ===
Colonists in western Pennsylvania fled to the safety of Fort Pitt after the outbreak of the war. Nearly 550 people crowded inside, including more than 200 women and children. Simeon Ecuyer, the Swiss-born British officer in command, wrote that "We are so crowded in the fort that I fear disease... the smallpox is among us." Lenape and others attacked the fort on June 22, 1763, and kept it under siege throughout July. Meanwhile, Lenape and Shawnee war parties raided into Pennsylvania, taking captives and killing unknown numbers of settlers. Indians sporadically fired on Fort Bedford and Fort Ligonier, smaller strongholds linking Fort Pitt to the east, but they never took them.

Before the war, Amherst had dismissed the possibility that Indians would offer any effective resistance to British rule, but that summer he found the military situation becoming increasingly grim. He wrote the commander at Fort Detroit that captured enemy Indians should "immediately be put to death, their extirpation being the only security for our future safety." To Colonel Henry Bouquet, who was preparing to lead an expedition to relieve Fort Pitt, Amherst wrote on about June 29, 1763: "Could it not be contrived to send the smallpox among the disaffected tribes of Indians? We must on this occasion use every stratagem in our power to reduce them." Bouquet responded that he would try to spread smallpox to the Indians by giving them blankets that had been exposed to the disease. (Note: Bouquet to Amherst, July 13: "I will try to inoculate the bastards with some blankets that may fall into their hands, and take care not to get the disease myself.") Amherst replied to Bouquet on July 16, endorsing the plan. (Note: Amherst to Bouquet, July 16: "You will do well to inoculate the Indians by means of blankets, as well as every other method that can serve to extirpate this execrable race.")

As it turned out, officers at Fort Pitt had already attempted what Amherst and Bouquet were discussing, apparently without having been ordered by Amherst or Bouquet. (Note: "Neither Amherst nor Bouquet actually tried germ warfare. The attempt to disseminate smallpox took place at Fort Pitt independent of both of them.") During a parley at Fort Pitt on June 24, Captain Ecuyer gave representatives of the besieging Lenape two blankets and a handkerchief that had been exposed to smallpox, hoping to spread the disease to the Indians and end the siege. William Trent, the fort's militia commander, wrote in his journal that "we gave them two Blankets and an Handkerchief out of the Small Pox Hospital. I hope it will have the desired effect." Trent submitted an invoice to the British Army, writing that the items had been "taken from people in the Hospital to Convey the Smallpox to the Indians." The expense was approved by Ecuyer, and ultimately by General Thomas Gage, Amherst's successor.

Historian and folklorist Adrienne Mayor (1995) wrote that the smallpox blanket incident "has taken on legendary overtones as believers and nonbelievers continue to argue over the facts and their interpretation." Peckham (1947), Jennings (1988), and Nester (2000) concluded the attempt to deliberately infect Indians with smallpox was successful, resulting in numerous deaths that hampered the Indian war effort. Fenn (2000) argued that "circumstantial evidence" suggests the attempt was successful.

Other scholars have expressed doubts about whether the attempt was effective. McConnell (1992) argued the smallpox outbreak among the Indians preceded the blanket incident, with limited effect, since Indians were familiar with the disease and adept at isolating the infected. Ranlet (2000) wrote that previous historians had overlooked that the Lenape chiefs who handled the blankets were in good health a month later; he believed the attempt to infect the Indians had been a "total failure." (Note: "Deliberately trying to spread disease is despicable in whatever century it might take place, but the smallpox incident has been blown out of all proportion, given that it was likely a total failure.") Dixon (2005) argued that if the scheme had been successful, the Indians would have broken off the siege of Fort Pitt, but they kept it up for weeks after receiving the blankets. Medical writers have expressed reservations about the efficacy of spreading smallpox through blankets and the difficulty of determining if the outbreak was intentional or naturally occurring. (Note: "However, in the light of contemporary knowledge, it remains doubtful whether [Ecuyer's] hopes were fulfilled, given the fact that the transmission of smallpox through this kind of vector is much less efficient than respiratory transmission....")

=== Bushy Run and Devil's Hole ===
On August 1, 1763, most of the Indians broke off the siege at Fort Pitt to intercept 500 British troops marching to the fort under Colonel Bouquet. On August 5, these two forces met at the Battle of Bushy Run. Although his force suffered heavy casualties, Bouquet fought off the attack and relieved Fort Pitt on August 20, bringing the siege to an end. His victory at Bushy Run was celebrated by the British; church bells rang through the night in Philadelphia, and King George praised him.

This victory was followed by a costly defeat. Fort Niagara, one of the most important western forts, was not assaulted, but on September 14, 1763, at least 300 Senecas, Odawas, and Ojibwas attacked a supply train along the Niagara Portage. Two companies sent from Fort Niagara to rescue the supply train were also defeated. More than 70 soldiers and teamsters were killed in these actions, which colonists dubbed the "Devil's Hole Massacre", the deadliest engagement for British soldiers during the war.

== Paxton Boys ==
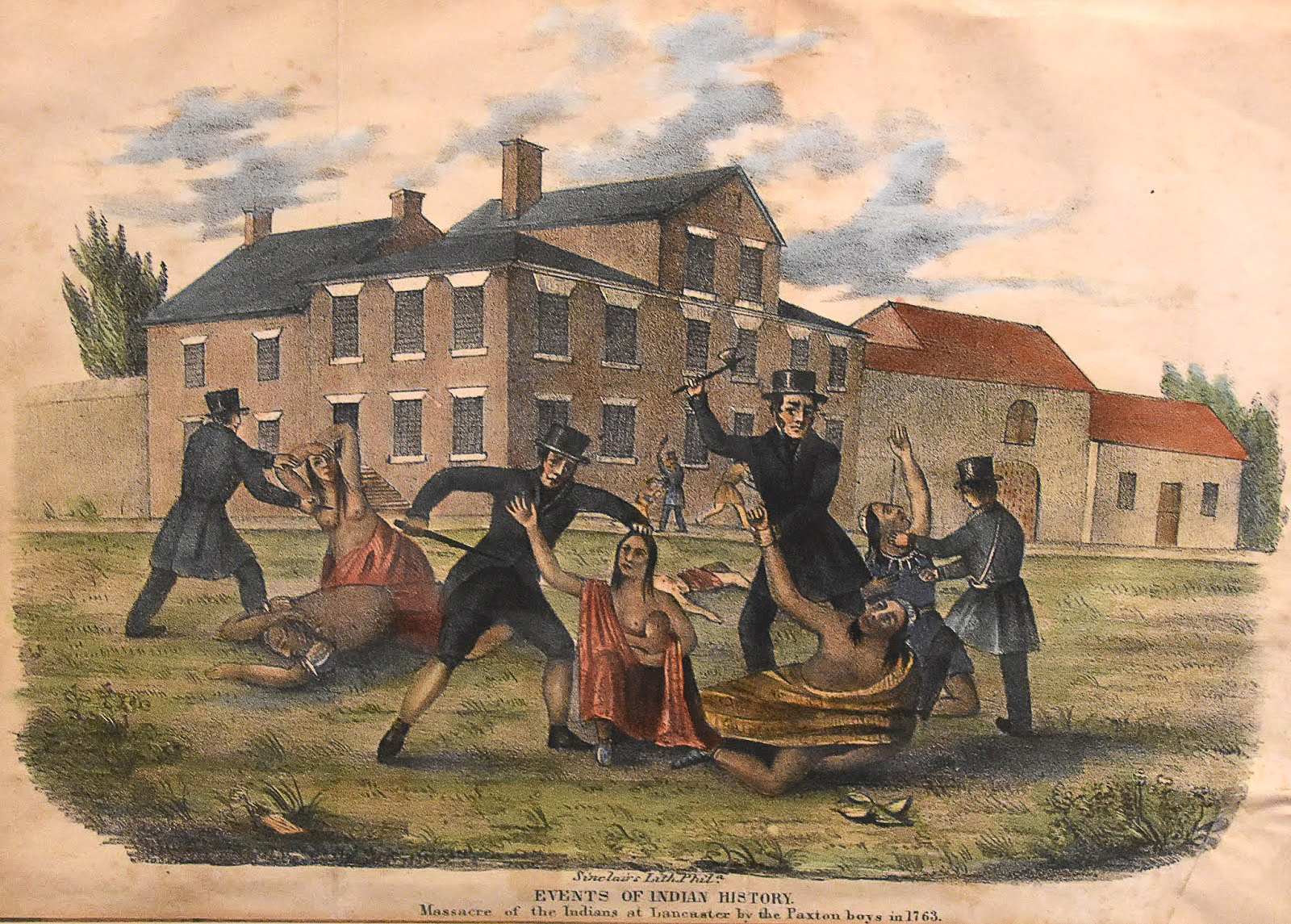
Massacre of the Indians at Lancaster by the Paxton Boys in 1763, a historically inaccurate lithograph published in John Wimer's 1841 Events in Indian History

The violence and terror of Pontiac's War convinced many Pennsylvanians that their government was not doing enough to protect them. This discontentment was manifested most seriously in an uprising led by a vigilante group known as the Paxton Boys, so-called because they were primarily from the area around the Pennsylvania village of Paxton (or Paxtang). The Paxton Boys turned their anger towards the Susquehannock and the Moravian Lenape and Mohican who lived peacefully in small enclaves near white Pennsylvanian settlements. Prompted by rumors that a raiding party had been seen at the Susquehannock village of Conestoga Town, a group of 50 or more Paxton Boys rode there on December 14, 1763, and murdered the six individuals they found there. Pennsylvania officials placed the remaining 14 Susquehannock in protective custody in Lancaster, but the Paxton Boys broke into the workhouse on December 27 and killed them. Governor John Penn issued bounties for the ringleaders, but none of the Paxton Boys were arrested.

The Paxton Boys then set their sights on the Moravian Lenape and Mohican, who had been brought to Philadelphia for protection. Several hundred Paxton Boys and their followers marched on Philadelphia in February 1764, but the presence of British troops and Philadelphia associators dissuaded them from committing more violence. Benjamin Franklin, who had helped organize the defense, negotiated with the Paxton leaders and brought an end to the crisis. Afterwards, Franklin published a scathing indictment of the Paxton Boys. "If an Indian injures me," he asked, "does it follow that I may revenge that Injury on all Indians?"

== British response, 1764–1766 ==
Indian raids on frontier settlements escalated in the spring and summer of 1764. The hardest hit colony was Virginia, where more than 100 settlers were killed. On May 26 in Maryland, 15 colonists working in a field near Fort Cumberland were killed. On June 14, about 13 settlers near Fort Loudoun in Pennsylvania were killed and their homes burned. The most notorious raid occurred on July 26, when four Lenape warriors killed and scalped a school teacher and ten children in what is now Franklin County, Pennsylvania. Incidents such as these prompted the Pennsylvania Assembly, with the approval of Governor Penn, to reintroduce the scalp bounties offered during the French and Indian War, which paid money for every enemy Indian killed above the age of ten, including women.

General Amherst, held responsible for the uprising by the Board of Trade, was recalled to London in August 1763 and replaced by Major General Thomas Gage. In 1764, Gage sent two expeditions into the west to crush the rebellion, rescue British prisoners, and arrest the Indians responsible for the war. According to historian Fred Anderson, Gage's campaign, which had been designed by Amherst, prolonged the war for more than a year because it focused on punishing the Indians rather than ending the war. Gage's one significant departure from Amherst's plan was to allow William Johnson to conduct a peace treaty at Niagara, giving Indians an opportunity to "bury the hatchet."

=== Fort Niagara treaty ===
From July to August 1764, Johnson conducted a treaty at Fort Niagara with about 2,000 Indians in attendance, primarily Haudenosaunee. Although most Haudenosaunee had stayed out of the war, Senecas from the Genesee River valley had taken up arms against the British, and Johnson worked to bring them back into the Covenant Chain alliance. As restitution for the Devil's Hole ambush, the Senecas were compelled to cede the strategically important Niagara portage to the British. Johnson even convinced the Haudenosaunee to send a war party against the Ohio Indians. This Haudenosaunee expedition captured a number of Lenape and destroyed abandoned Lenape and Shawnee towns in the Susquehanna Valley, but otherwise the Haudenosaunee did not contribute to the war effort as much as Johnson had desired.

=== Two expeditions ===
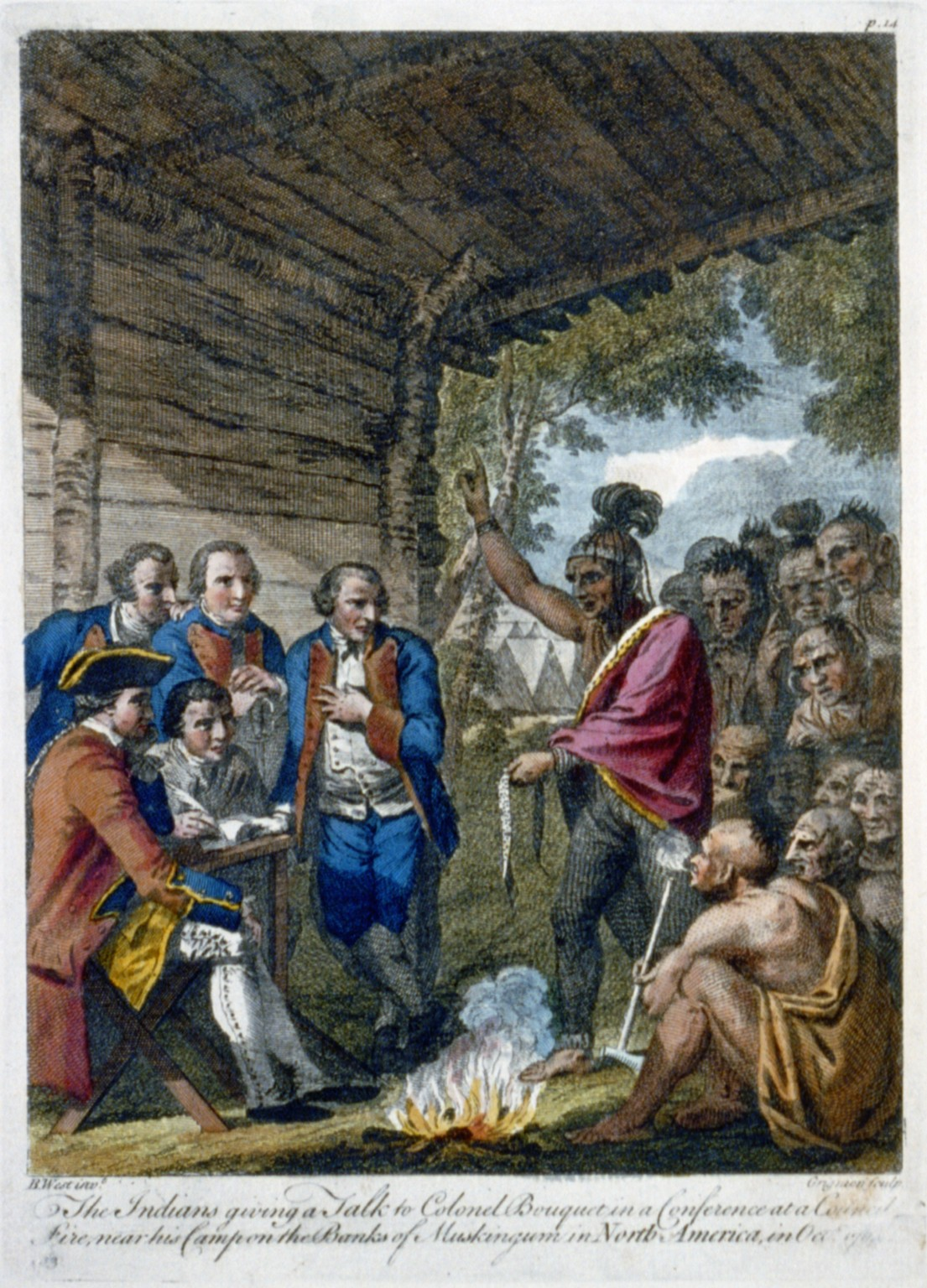
Bouquet's negotiations are depicted in this 1765 engraving based on a painting by Benjamin West. The Indian orator holds a belt of wampum, essential for diplomacy in the Eastern Woodlands.

Having secured the area around Fort Niagara, the British launched two military expeditions into the west. The first expedition, led by Colonel John Bradstreet, was to travel by boat across Lake Erie and reinforce Detroit. Bradstreet was to subdue the Indians around Detroit before marching south into the Ohio Country. The second expedition, commanded by Colonel Bouquet, was to march west from Fort Pitt and form a second front in the Ohio Country.

Bradstreet left Fort Schlosser in early August 1764 with about 1,200 soldiers and a large contingent of Indian allies enlisted by Sir William Johnson. Bradstreet felt that he did not have enough troops to subdue enemy Indians by force, and so when strong winds on Lake Erie forced him to stop at Fort Presque Isle on August 12, he decided to negotiate a treaty with a delegation of Ohio Indians led by Guyasuta. Bradstreet exceeded his authority by conducting a peace treaty rather than a simple truce, and by agreeing to halt Bouquet's expedition, which had not yet left Fort Pitt. Gage, Johnson, and Bouquet were outraged when they learned what Bradstreet had done. Gage rejected the treaty, believing that Bradstreet had been duped into abandoning his offensive in the Ohio Country. Gage may have been correct: the Ohio Indians did not return prisoners as promised in a second meeting with Bradstreet in September, and some Shawnees were trying to enlist French aid in order to continue the war.

Bradstreet continued westward, unaware his unauthorized diplomacy was angering his superiors. He reached Fort Detroit on August 26, where he negotiated another treaty. In an attempt to discredit Pontiac, who was not present, Bradstreet chopped up a peace belt Pontiac had sent to the meeting. According to historian Richard White, "such an act, roughly equivalent to a European ambassador's urinating on a proposed treaty, had shocked and offended the gathered Indians." Bradstreet also claimed the Indians had accepted British sovereignty as a result of his negotiations, but Johnson believed this had not been fully explained to the Indians and that further councils would be needed. Bradstreet had successfully reinforced and reoccupied British forts in the region, but his diplomacy proved to be controversial and inconclusive.

Colonel Bouquet, delayed in Pennsylvania while mustering the militia, finally set out from Fort Pitt on October 3, 1764, with 1,150 men. He marched to the Muskingum River in the Ohio Country, within striking distance of a number of Indian villages. Treaties had been negotiated at Fort Niagara and Fort Detroit, so the Ohio Indians were isolated and, with some exceptions, ready to make peace. In a council which began on October 17, Bouquet demanded that the Ohio Indians return all captives, including those not yet returned from the French and Indian War. Guyasuta and other leaders reluctantly handed over more than 200 captives, many of whom had been adopted into Indian families. Not all of the captives were present, so the Indians were compelled to surrender hostages as a guarantee that the other captives would be returned. The Ohio Indians agreed to attend a more formal peace conference with William Johnson, which was finalized in July 1765.

=== Treaty with Pontiac ===
Although the military conflict essentially ended with the 1764 expeditions, Indians still called for resistance in the Illinois Country, where British troops had yet to take possession of Fort de Chartres from the French. A Shawnee war chief named Charlot Kaské emerged as the most strident anti-British leader in the region, temporarily surpassing Pontiac in influence. Kaské traveled as far south as New Orleans in an effort to enlist French aid against the British.

In 1765, the British decided that the occupation of the Illinois Country could only be accomplished by diplomatic means. As Gage commented to one of his officers, he was determined to have "none our enemy" among the Indian peoples, and that included Pontiac, to whom he now sent a wampum belt suggesting peace talks. Pontiac had become less militant after hearing of Bouquet's truce with the Ohio country Indians. Johnson's deputy, George Croghan, accordingly traveled to the Illinois country in the summer of 1765, and although he was injured along the way in an attack by Kickapoos and Mascoutens, he managed to meet and negotiate with Pontiac. While Charlot Kaské wanted to burn Croghan at the stake, Pontiac urged moderation and agreed to travel to New York, where he made a formal treaty with William Johnson at Fort Ontario on July 25, 1766. It was hardly a surrender: no lands were ceded, no prisoners returned, and no hostages were taken. Rather than accept British sovereignty, Kaské left British territory by crossing the Mississippi River with other French and Native refugees.

== Aftermath ==
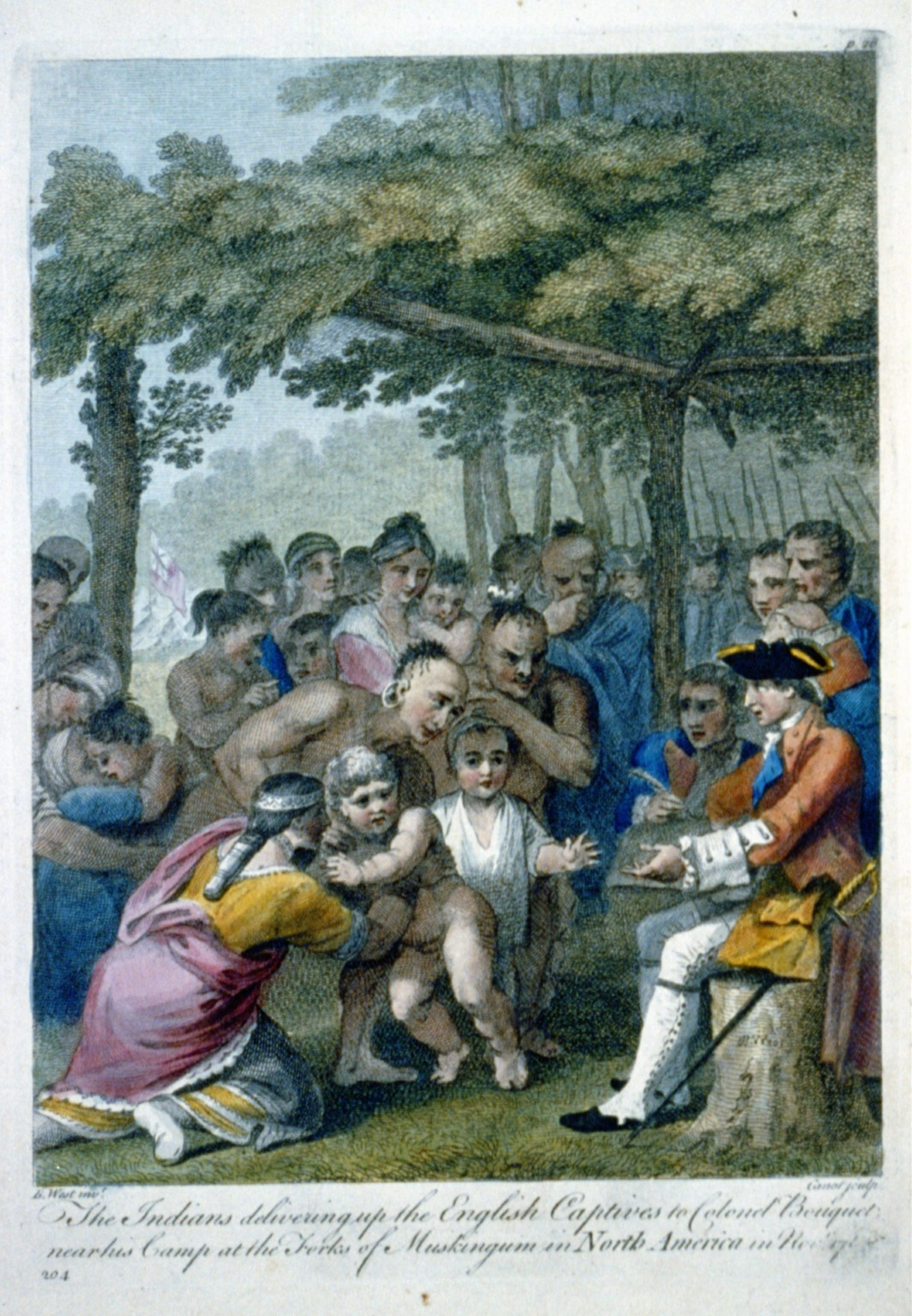
Because many white children taken as captives had been adopted into Native families, their forced return often resulted in emotional scenes, as depicted in this engraving based on a painting by Benjamin West.

The total loss of life resulting from Pontiac's War is unknown. About 400 British soldiers were killed in action and perhaps 50 were captured and tortured to death. George Croghan estimated that 2,000 settlers had been killed or captured, a figure sometimes repeated as 2,000 settlers killed. (Note: Dowd argues that Croghan's widely reported estimate "cannot be taken seriously" because it was a "wild guess" made while Croghan was far away in London.) The violence compelled approximately 4,000 settlers from Pennsylvania and Virginia to flee. American Indian losses went mostly unrecorded, but it has been estimated at least 200 warriors were killed in battle, with additional deaths if biological warfare initiated at Fort Pitt was successful.

Pontiac's War has traditionally been portrayed as a defeat for the Indians, but scholars now usually view it as a military stalemate: while the Indians had failed to drive away the British, the British were unable to conquer the Indians. Negotiation and accommodation, rather than success on the battlefield, ultimately brought an end to the war. The Indians had won a victory of sorts by compelling the British government to abandon Amherst's policies and create a relationship with the Indians modeled on the Franco-Indian alliance.

Relations between British colonists and American Indians, which had been severely strained during the French and Indian War, reached a new low during Pontiac's War. According to Dixon (2005), "Pontiac's War was unprecedented for its awful violence, as both sides seemed intoxicated with genocidal fanaticism." Richter (2001) characterizes the Indian attempt to drive out the British, and the effort of the Paxton Boys to eliminate Indians from their midst, as parallel examples of ethnic cleansing. People on both sides of the conflict had come to the conclusion that colonists and natives were inherently different and could not live with each other. According to Richter, the war saw the emergence of "the novel idea that all Native people were 'Indians,' that all Euro-Americans were 'Whites,' and that all on one side must unite to destroy the other."

The British government also came to the conclusion that colonists and Indians must be kept apart. On October 7, 1763, the Crown issued the Royal Proclamation of 1763, an effort to reorganize British North America after the Treaty of Paris. The Proclamation, already in the works when Pontiac's War erupted, was hurriedly issued after news of the uprising reached London. Officials drew a boundary line between the British colonies and American Indian lands west of the Appalachian Mountains, creating a vast "Indian Reserve" that stretched from the Appalachians to the Mississippi River and from Florida to Quebec. By forbidding colonists from trespassing on Indian lands, the British government hoped to avoid more conflicts like Pontiac's War. "The Royal Proclamation," writes Calloway (2006), "reflected the notion that segregation not interaction should characterize Indian-white relations."

The effects of Pontiac's War were long-lasting. Because the Proclamation officially recognized that indigenous people had certain rights to the lands they occupied, it has been called a Native American "Bill of Rights," and still informs the relationship between the Canadian government and First Nations. For British colonists and land speculators, however, the Proclamation seemed to deny them the fruits of victory—western lands—that had been won in the war with France. This created resentment, undermining colonial attachment to the Empire and contributing to the coming of the American Revolution. According to Calloway, "Pontiac's Revolt was not the last American war for independence—American colonists launched a rather more successful effort a dozen years later, prompted in part by the measures the British government took to try to prevent another war like Pontiac's."

For American Indians, Pontiac's War demonstrated the possibilities of pan-tribal cooperation in resisting Anglo-American colonial expansion. Although the conflict divided tribes and villages, the war also saw the first extensive multi-tribal resistance to European colonization in North America, and the first war between Europeans and American Indians that did not end in complete defeat for the Indians. The Proclamation of 1763 ultimately did not prevent British colonists and land speculators from expanding westward, and so Indians found it necessary to form new resistance movements. Beginning with conferences hosted by Shawnees in 1767, in the following decades leaders such as Joseph Brant, Alexander McGillivray, Blue Jacket, and Tecumseh would attempt to forge confederacies that would revive the resistance efforts of Pontiac's War.
