= Henry Gladwin =

British Army officer (1729/1730–1791)

Major-General Henry Gladwin
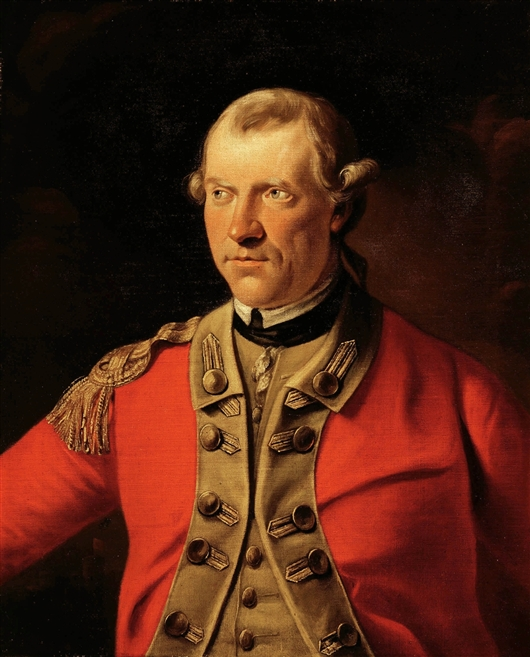
- Portrait by John Hall
- Born: 1729/30; Stubbing Court, Wingerworth, Derbyshire, England
- Died: 22 June 1791; Stubbing Court, Wingerworth, Derbyshire, England

Major-General Henry Gladwin (1729/1730 – 22 June 1791) was a British Army officer who served in the French and Indian War and Pontiac's War.

== Origins ==
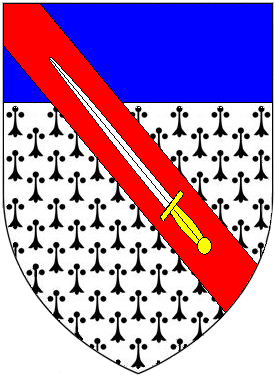
Arms of Gladwin: Ermine, a chief azure over all a bend gules charged with a sword argent hilt and pomel or. Granted by the College of Arms in 1666.

Henry was born in 1729 or 1730 at Stubbing Court, near Wingerworth, Chesterfield, in Derbyshire. He was the eldest son of Henry Gladwin (1692–1763) by his second wife Mary, daughter of John Digby Dakeyne of Stubbing Edge Hall. They were married on 28 Oct 1728 in Wingerworth. His father's first wife Marina Holland, heiress of Stubbing Court died in childbirth May 1727 Mary Dakeyne was the sister and heiress of John Dakeyne. He was a great-grandson of Thomas II Gladwin (1628/9-1697) of Tupton Hall, now Tupton Hall school, in the parish of Wingerworth near Chesterfield, Derbyshire, Sheriff of Derbyshire in 1668. Thomas II was the second son and principal heir of Thomas I Gladwin (c. 1598 – 1667) of Boythorpe and Tupton, Derbyshire, an eminent lead merchant who raised an estate of £800 or £900 per annum.

One of Gladwin's brothers was John Gladwin (1731–1822) of Mansfield, Nottinghamshire, a lawyer and steward of the royal Sherwood Forest and attorney and steward of the manor of Mansfield to William Cavendish-Bentinck, 3rd Duke of Portland (1738–1809), Prime Minister of Great Britain, of Welbeck Abbey, Nottinghamshire and Burlington House, London. John's 4th daughter Dorothy Gladwin (died 1838) "Lady Dolly" married in 1787 Francis Eyre (1762–1827)(later Radclyffe-Livingstone-Eyre), self styled 6th Earl of Newburgh, of Hassop Hall, Bakewell, Derbyshire. All her 10 children died childless and the last two earls, both her sons, supposedly had settled their vast estates, producing £50,000 per annum, on their mother's family, the Gladwins. In 1885 the estate was claimed, apparently without success, by Mr Gladwin Cloves Cave of Rossbrin Manor, Cork, Ireland, a great-grandson of Mrs Elizabeth Cloves, "Lady Dolly's" eldest sister.

Henry's sister, Dorothy Gladwin (1736–1792), married Henry's half-brother-in-law Rev. Basil Berridge, rector of Alderchurch, Lincolnshire. Her portrait painted by Joseph Wright of Derby survives.

Henry's uncle was Thomas Gladwin, a silversmith of London, MARK TG AND CREST, c. 1715–1725 who "did not prosper in the world"; one of his brothers, Thomas (1725–1799), married Anne Gravenor, a daughter of John Gravenor, an apothecary of Ipswich. Thomas's wife is depicted as one of the daughters in the portrait c. 1754 of the Gravenor family by Thomas Gainsborough "John and Ann Gravenor, with their daughters" now in the Yale Center for British Art, New Haven, Connecticut, Paul Mellon collection. Thomas Gladwin's portrait was painted by Johann Zoffany in London in 1777. This portrait exists within the family today.

== Career ==
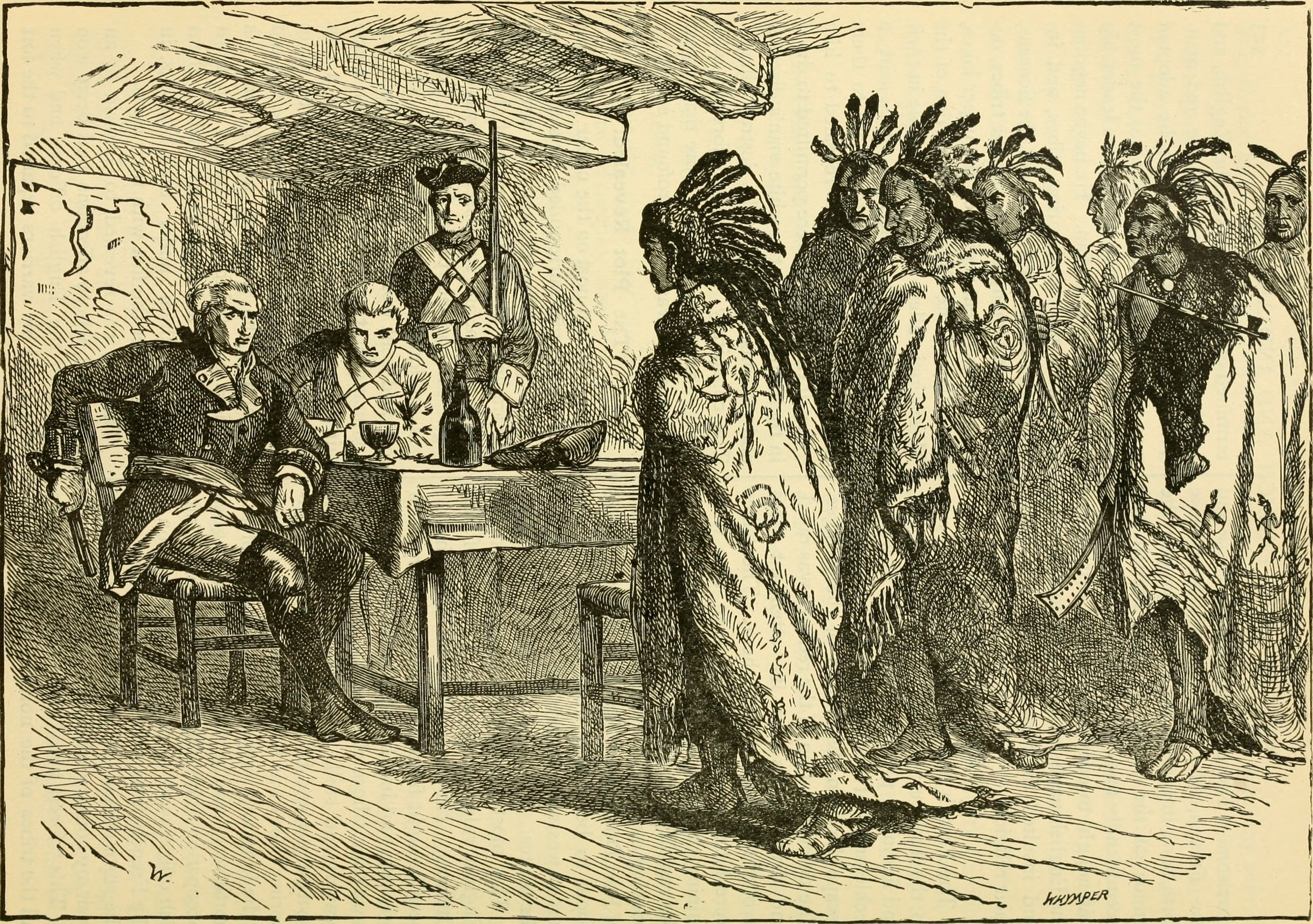
Illustration of Odawa chief Pontiac visiting Gladwin at Fort Detroit.

Gladwin became lieutenant of the 48th (Northamptonshire) Regiment of Foot on 28 August 1753. In 1755, he was wounded in the Battle of the Monongahela.

Chief Pontiac of the Ottawas planned to take Fort Detroit, but Gladwin got wind of the plan. One romantic theory suggests that a Native American woman in love with Gladwin informed him of it. When Pontiac arrived at Fort Detroit, the British were ready. This made Pontiac retreat and set up a siege instead of taking over the fort. In Michigan, Gladwin County is named after Major Henry Gladwin. The county was named in 1831 and organized in 1875.

== Marriage and children ==
In 1762 he married Frances Beridge,(1741–1817) a daughter of Rev. John Beridge. of Barkston, Lincolnshire, by his 2nd wife Susan Rutter. By Frances he had children, ten of whom survived, including:

=== Sons ===
- Charles Dakeyne Gladwin (1775–1844), eldest son and heir, Lt-Col. of the Derbyshire Militia, who let Stubbing Court to James Abercromby, 1st Baron Dunfermline (1776–1858), Speaker of the House of Commons and moved to Belmont in the parish of Brampton, Derbyshire. Charles married Mary Anne Stringer and left one daughter, Frances Gladwin, his sole heiress, who married Stephen Melland. The Gladwin estates descended to Charles's great-nephew Captain Richard Henry Goodwin-Gladwin (1833–1895) of Hinchley Wood House, Ashbourne, who on 24 April 1881 assumed the surname and arms of Gladwin by royal licence. Richard's own heir was his nephew (son of his sister Frances Goodwin and her husband John Errington) Gilbert Launcelot Gladwin-Errington (born 1876), of Hinchley Wood House.
- Henry Gladwin (died young)

=== Daughters ===
- Frances Gladwin (1773–1841), eldest daughter, who in 1801 married Francis Goodwin (died 1836) of Hinchley Wood House, Ashbourne, Derbyshire. Their son was Rev. Henry John Goodwin (1803–1863), who married Frances Turbutt, daughter and heiress of Rev. Richard Burrow Turbutt. Henry's son was Capt. Richard Henry Goodwin-Gladwin (1833–1895), the eventual heir of his great-uncle Charles Dakeyne Gladwin.
- Dorothy Gladwin, 2nd daughter, in 1792 married Joshua Jebb (1769–1845) of Chesterfield. Their eldest son was Major-General Sir Joshua Jebb (1793–1863), KCB, Inspector general of military prisons
- Mary I Gladwin (died young)
- Mary II Gladwin(1777–1837), 3rd daughter, who in 1800 married Baldwin Duppa Duppa (1763–1847), JP, DL, of Hollingbourne House, Maidstone, Kent. Their daughter Ellen Duppa (died 1878) married her 1st cousin Gladwyn Turbutt, whose descendants in 1888 on inheriting Hollingbourne assumed the name Duppa de Uphaugh.
- Ann Gladwin(1778–1855), 4th daughter, who in 1814 married William Turbutt (died 1836) of Ogston Hall, Alfreton, Derbyshire and Arnold Grove, Nottinghamshire. Their son was Gladwin Turbutt (1823–1872), High Sheriff of Derbyshire in 1858, who married his 1st cousin Ellen Duppa.
- Charlotte Gladwin(born 1780), 5th daughter, who married in 1805 Rev George Hutton, Fellow of Magdalen College, Oxford and rector of Sutterton and Algarkirk. He was the 5th son of Thomas Hutton (1715–1774), who built Gate Burton Hall, Gainsborough, Lincolnshire, in 1768.
- Martha Gladwin (1785–1817), died unmarried.
- Harriet Gladwin. Her 56 page Commonplace book written between 1808 and 1810 survives in the collection of the William L. Clements Library, University of Michigan It contains the following: A copy of Travels through the Interior Parts of North America in the Years 1766, 1767, and 1768 (33 pages), including an account of the siege of Detroit, by Jonathan Carver (1710–1780); "An Ode to General Gladwin" by William Hayley (1745–1820), and 3 additional memorial poems and epitaphs (7 pages) for 3 members of Harriet Gladwin's family. The first is "An Epitaph on General Gladwin who departed this life on the 21 of June 179[1] in the 61st year of his age" (pp. 49–51). A brief prose celebration of his military accomplishments is followed by a 10-line poem. The next memorial is dedicated "To the Memory of Jhon [John] Beridge M. D. who died Octbr. 17th 1788 aged 45" (p. 53). This 6-line poem, written by William Hayley, commemorates Harriet Gladwin's grandfather, Henry Gladwin's father-in-law. The final memorial, attributed to "G. H.," is titled "To the Memory of a beloved Wife who died May the 3d. 1810[.] By her Husband" (pp. 54–56). The poem contains reflections on mortality and on the life and qualities of the deceased.
- Ellen Gladwin
- Susannah Gladwin

== Death and burial ==
Henry Gladwin died on 22 June 1791 at Stubbing Court, Derbyshire. His obituary in the Gentleman's Magazine for July 1791 was as follows:

After a long illness at his seat at Stubbing, near Chesterfield, county Derby, Major-General Gladwin, an officer of great merit. He had served a long time in America, where he was wounded at the action with the French and Indians at the back settlements on the banks of the river Ohio in July 1755, when Gen. Braddock, the English commander, unhappily lost his life.

Gladwin was buried in Wingerworth Church, and his monument there survives inscribed as follows:

Here lieth the remains of General H. Gladwin. He departed this life on the 22nd day of June, 1794 (sic) in the 62d year of his age. He was distinguished by all those private and social duties which constitute to the man and the Christian. Early trained to arms and martial deeds he sought for fame amidst the toils of hostile war, with that ardour which animates the breast of a brave soldier. On the plains of North America he reaped the laurels at the battles of Niagara and Ticonderoga, in which he was wounded. His courage was conspicuous and his memorable defence of Fort Detroit against the attack of the Indians will be long recorded in the annals of a grateful country. Also Mary and Henry, son and daughter of the aforesaid General H. Gladwin and his wife, who died in infancy; Martha Gladwin, their daughter who died October 1817 aged 32. Also Frances sister of the late John Beridge, of Derby, M. D., and widow of the above General Gladwin, died 16 October 1817 aged 74 years.

== Will ==
The following abstract of the will dated 20 April 1791 of "Henry Gladwin, General, of Stubbing, Derbyshire" was made by Derbyshire Record Office:

Property at Boythorpe, par. Chesterfield to his wife Frances to dispose in her will to their daughters Frances, Dorothy, Mary, Ann, Charlotte, Martha, Harriet, Ellen and Susannah; property at S Kirby, Yorkshire to be sold, and his wife to have the residue; wife to have life interest in properties at Stubbing, Walton, Wingerworth, Ashover and mines and mineral interests in Ashover and Stoney Middleton, and after his wife's death the lands in Brocklehurst, Ashover, in the possession of William Else, to daughter Harriet the rest to go to son Charles Gladwin and the heirs of his body with a remainder to Frances and her heirs; wife to have moiety of manor of Ulsoby Waterless in Ulsoby and of properties in the parishes or precincts of Claxby, Hogsthorpe, Willoughby, Ulsoby, Forthington, Skedleby, Anderby, Huttoft, Wych and Cumberworth, Lincolnshire to which she was entitled as heir-at-law of her brother, the late John Beridge of Derby, Doctor of Physic; wife Frances and Rev Basil Beridge, executors.

== Sources ==
- Russell, Peter E. (1979). "Gladwin, Henry". In Halpenny, Francess G. (ed.). Dictionary of Canadian Biography. Vol. IV (1771–1800) (online ed.). University of Toronto Press.
- Moore, Charles (1897). The Gladwin Manuscripts with an Introduction and a Sketch of the Conspiracy of Pontiac. Lansing, Michigan: Robert Smith Printing Co.
- Harleian Publication no. 38, 1895, Familiae Minorum Gentium ("Families of the Minor Gentry"), pp.616-618, pedigree of Gladwin
- Pirie-Gordon, H., ed. (1937). Burke's Genealogical and Heraldic History of the Landed Gentry (15th ed.). London: Gladwin-Errington of Hichley Wood, pedigree of Gladwin family. pp. 706–707.
