= Kekewepelethy =

Shawnee leader (died c. 1808)

- Died: c. 1808
- Other names: Captain Johnny, Great Hawk, Tame Hawk, King John
- Citizenship: Shawnee
- Years active: 1776–1800
- Known for: Organizing Native resistance to U.S. expansion, refusing to sign the Treaty of Greenville

Kekewepelethy (died c. 1808), also known as Captain Johnny, was the principal civil chief of the Shawnees in the Ohio Country during the Northwest Indian War (1786–1795). He first came to prominence during the American Revolutionary War (1775–1783), in which he, like most of his fellow Mekoche Shawnees, initially sought to remain neutral. He joined the war against the United States around 1780, moving to Wakatomika, a Shawnee town known for its militant defense of the Ohio Country.

Following the Revolutionary War, Kekewepelethy rejected the claims of U.S. officials that the Shawnees had been conquered and had lost their Ohio Country lands. He supported the formation of a confederation of Native people to resist U.S. expansion. In 1786, he succumbed to pressure to sign the Treaty of Fort Finney, which ceded lands in Ohio, although most Shawnees rejected the treaty. After Moluntha, the principal Shawnee chief, was murdered by an American soldier, Kekewepelethy emerged as his successor. Under Blue Jacket, the principal Shawnee war chief, the Native confederacy won early victories against the Americans in the Northwest Indian War, but were soundly defeated at the Battle of Fallen Timbers in 1794. After the battle, some Shawnees leaders, including Blue Jacket, decided to make peace, signing the Treaty of Greenville in 1795, ceding what is now southern and eastern Ohio to the United States. Kekewepelethy refused to sign, and instead retreated to the Detroit region, then still under British control, where he unsuccessfully tried to revive the war effort. His final years were spent in obscurity, and he seems to have died in northern Ohio around 1808.

== Background and American Revolution ==
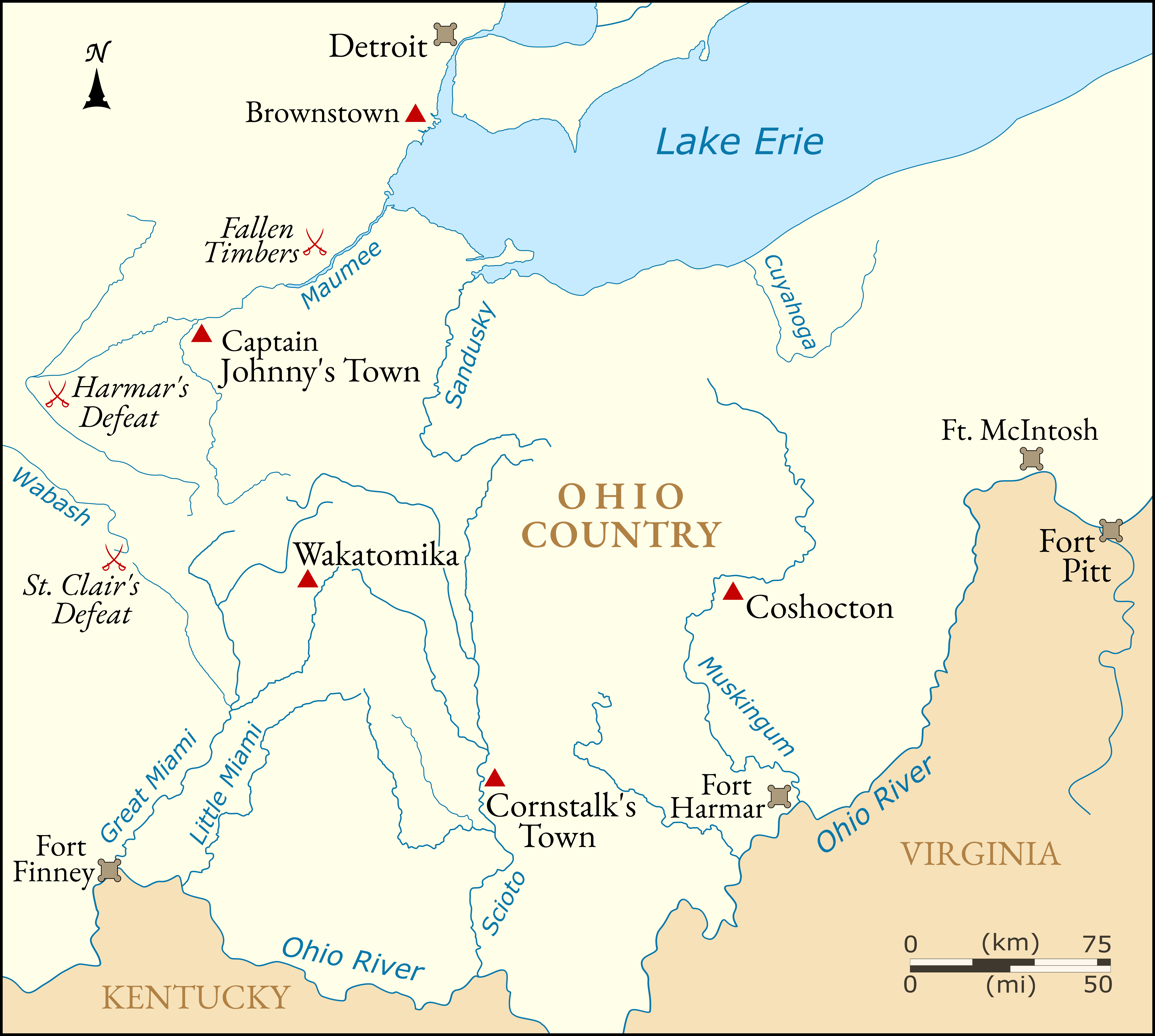
Locations associated with Kekewepelethy

Little is known of Kekewepelethy's background or early life. The Shawnees had once lived in the Ohio Country, but in the 1680s they had been driven out by the Iroquois. By Kekewepelethy's time, the far-flung Shawnees had begun to reunite in their traditional Ohio Country homeland. Shawnees of his era belonged to one of five tribal divisions: Kispoko, Chalahgawtha (Chillicothe), Mekoche, Pekowi (Piqua), and Hathawekela. Although the records are not explicit, Kekewepelethy probably belonged to the Mekoche division, since in councils he often spoke on behalf of other Mekoche leaders. His Native name was translated as "Great Hawk" or "Tame Hawk," and was recorded in a wide variety of spellings. (Note: Alternate spellings include Kekewepellethe, Kekewepellethy, Kekewapilethy, Kakawipilathy, and Kakiapalathy.) He was frequently referred to by English speakers as "Captain Johnny" or "Captain John," but before historian John Sugden's work on the Shawnees in the 1990s, it was not widely recognized by writers that Kekewepelethy and Captain Johnny were the same person. (Note: In 1995, Calloway wrote, "I am grateful to John Sugden for identifying Captain Johnny as Kekewepelethe". For Kekewepelethy and Captain Johnny being treated as different individuals, see for example Wiley Sword, President Washington's Indian War: The Struggle for the Old Northwest (1985), p. 243.)

Kekewepelethy first appears in historical documents at the outset of the American Revolutionary War (1775–1783), which in the Ohio Country was fought between American settlers and Natives, with Natives getting support from their British allies in Detroit. In October 1776, Kekewepelethy attended a meeting with U.S. Indian agent George Morgan at Fort Pitt. The Shawnee delegation was led by Cornstalk, who sought to keep the Shawnees neutral in the war. Kekewepelethy initially followed the path of neutrality, even after Cornstalk's murder in 1777 by American militiamen. In 1778 he moved with other Shawnees, primarily Mekoches, to live at the neutral Lenape village of Coshocton.

Around 1780, Kekewepelethy joined the Native war effort against the United States, moving further west to Wakatomika, a Shawnee town on the Mad River near present-day Zanesfield, Ohio. Wakatomika had previously been located on the Muskingum River, but had been destroyed by colonial Americans in 1774 during Lord Dunmore's War. The new Wakatomika, inhabited by Shawnees and Mingos, became a center of resistance to American expansion. According to Lakomäki (2014), "the Wakatomikans remained the most militant of all Shawnees," so much so that they were sometimes regarded as a distinct division of the tribe. Kekewepelethy, along with the Snake brothers (Peteusha and Shemanetoo), became a prominent military leader at Wakatomika.

== Northwest Indian War ==
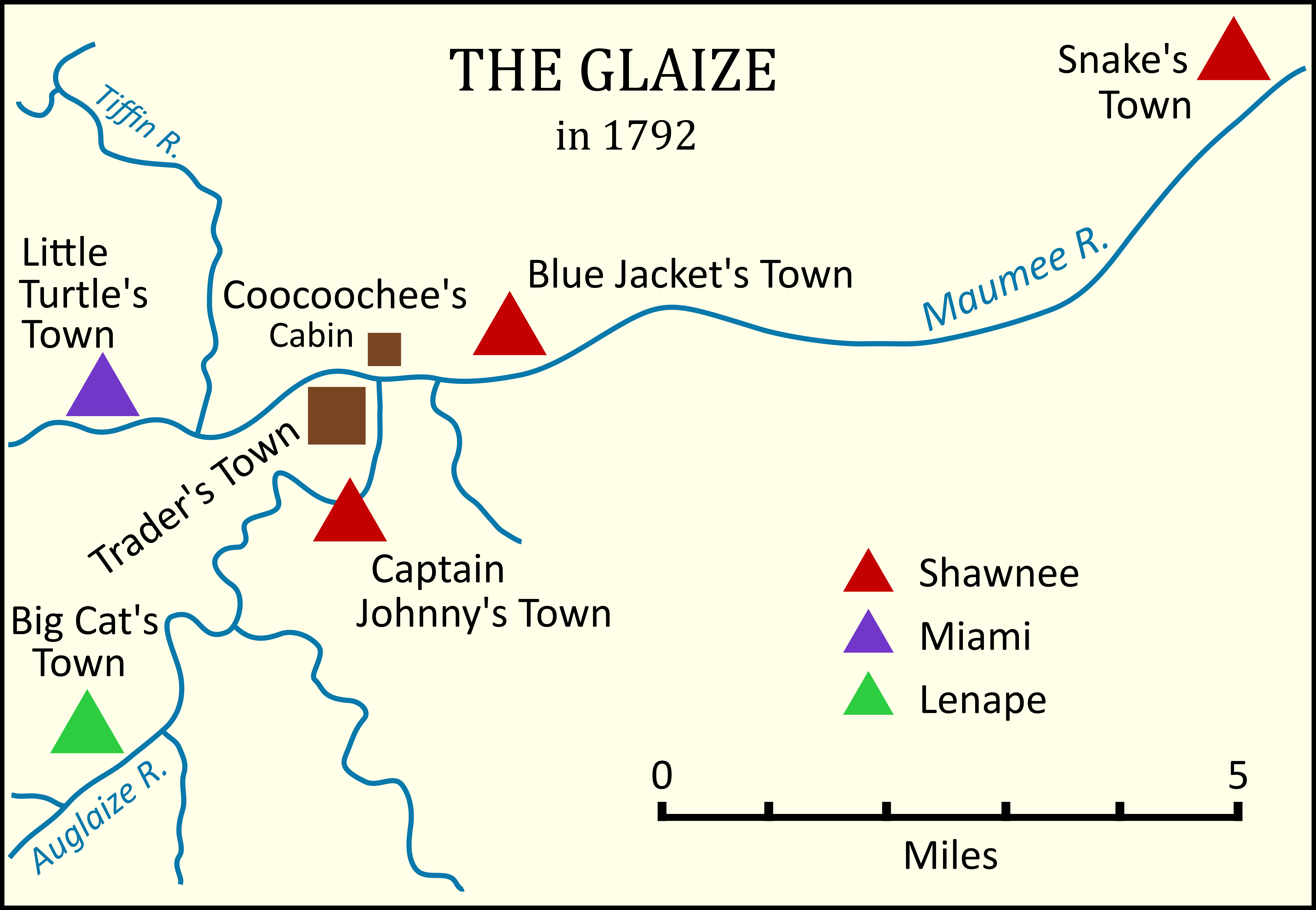
Native towns at the Glaize in 1792

The 1783 Treaty of Paris between Great Britain and the United States, which brought an end to the Revolutionary War, made no mention of the Native claims to the Ohio Country, and instead ceded the region to the United States. After the war, U.S. officials informed the Natives that their lands had been taken by right of conquest. Kekewepelethy refused to acknowledge that the Shawnees were a conquered people. He supported the formation of a pan-tribal coalition, the Northwestern Confederacy, which put forth a doctrine that Native lands were held in common by all tribes, and so no further land should be ceded to the United States without the consent of all the tribes.

The United States refused to recognize the Native Confederacy, and instead pursued a policy of "divide and rule." Some Native leaders buckled to pressure and signed treaties ceding Ohio Country land to the United States at Fort Stanwix (1784) and Fort McIntosh (1785). Kekewepelethy denounced these treaties in a May 1785 meeting with American commissioners at Wakatomika. With Simon Girty interpreting, he said:

According to the Lines settled by our Forefathers, the Boundary is the Ohio River, but you are coming upon the ground given to us by the Great Spirit. We wish you to be strong and keep your people on that side the River. We have no objections to carry on Trade with your Traders, provided they do not attempt to settle in our Country, but it is too clear to us your design is to take our Country from us. We remind you that you will find all the people of our Colour in this Island strong unanimous, and determined to act as one man in Defence of it, therefore be strong and keep your people within Bounds, or we shall take up a Rod and whip them back to your side of the Ohio.

In 1786 Kekewepelethy was among the Shawnees who met with American commissioners at Fort Finney (near modern Cincinnati). The Americans demanded that the Shawnees also sign a treaty relinquishing lands north of the Ohio River, but Kekewepelethy objected, insisting that Ohio River was the only acceptable boundary. He presented the commissioners with a belt of black wampum, indicating that he would go to war rather than submit. American commissioner George Rogers Clark knocked the belt off the table and stepped on it, grinding it into the dirt. Under the leadership of Moluntha, the principal civil chief, the Shawnees relented. They reluctantly signed the treaty, surrendering six hostages to ensure their compliance. Although Kekewepelethy was among those who signed, his defiant stance against the Americans was favorably remembered by those who remained committed to defending the Ohio Country.

Today you demand hostages till your prisoners are returned. You next say you will divide the lands. I now tell you it is not the custom of the Shawnese to give hostages, our words are to be believed, when we say a thing we stand to it, we are Shawnese—and as to the lands, God gave us this country, we do not understand measuring out the lands, it is all ours. You say you have goods for our women and children; you may keep your goods, and give them to the other nations, we will have none of them. Brothers, you seem to grow proud, because you have thrown down the King of England…. We have never given hostages, and we will not comply with this demand.

— Kekewepelethy, Speech at Fort Finney, January 30, 1786

Most Shawnees rejected the treaty, and hostilities continued between the Shawnees and the Kentuckians. Later in 1786, Kentucky militiamen invaded Shawnee territory, burning towns and taking captives, including the elderly Moluntha, who was murdered by an American militiaman. The Shawnees rebuilt their towns further north along the Maumee River. Kekewepelethy soon emerged as Moluntha's successor as principal civil chief. In August 1787, he arranged for a prisoner exchange with Americans in Maysville, Kentucky (then called Limestone), using prominent Kentucky settler Daniel Boone as an intermediary. By 1789, Kekewepelethy had established "Captain Johnny's Town" on the Auglaize River, near where it flowed into the Maumee. Captain Johnny's Town became the nucleus of a cluster of Native towns known as "The Glaize", which in 1792 would become the headquarters of the Northwestern Confederacy.

In 1787, the United States formed the Northwest Territory north of the Ohio River. Arthur St. Clair, the territorial governor, began to negotiate new treaties, abandoning the idea that the region had been conquered by "right of conquest." Instead, the new approach was to purchase the lands from the Natives. In 1789, St. Clair succeeded in getting some Natives, but not the Shawnees, to sign the Treaty of Fort Harmar and relinquish their claims to the territory. Kekewepelethy responded by trying to reinvigorate the Northwestern Confederacy, recruiting Miamis and Lenapes to aid the Shawnees in resisting American occupation. The Confederacy won major early victories in the Northwest Indian War against the Americans, in 1790 (Harmar's defeat) and 1791 (St. Clair's defeat). The Shawnees were led in these battles by Blue Jacket, who had emerged as the principal Shawnee war chief.

As a civil chief, Kekewepelethy apparently did not fight in the war. He instead served as a diplomat and spokesman, consulting with other Native leaders and obtaining aid from the British at Detroit. In July 1793, Kekewepelethy met with Joseph Brant and other leaders of the Confederacy. Brant proposed that the Confederacy might obtain peace with the United States by agreeing to cede that part of Ohio east of the Muskingum River to the United States. Kekewepelethy flatly disagreed, insisting that the Ohio River was the only acceptable boundary. He and Buckongahelas, a Lenape chief, traveled to Amherstburg in Upper Canada to meet with U.S. commissioners Benjamin Lincoln, Beverley Randolph, and Timothy Pickering, where they told the Americans that they would only settle for a boundary along the Ohio River. In subsequent negotiations back at the Maumee, Kekewepelethy's hardline position prevailed, and no agreement was reached between the Confederacy and the Americans. The Shawnees and their allies prepared to continue the war.

After the Confederacy was defeated at the Battle of Fallen Timbers in 1794, some Shawnees leaders, including Blue Jacket, Black Hoof (Catecahassa), and Red Pole (Musquaconocah), decided to make peace, signing the Treaty of Greenville in 1795, ceding what is now southern and eastern Ohio to the United States. Kekewepelethy refused to follow suit. With the help of British Indian agent Alexander McKee, he successfully kept most Shawnees from attending the treaty council. He tried to recruit additional warriors to continue the war, to no avail.

== Later years and legacy ==
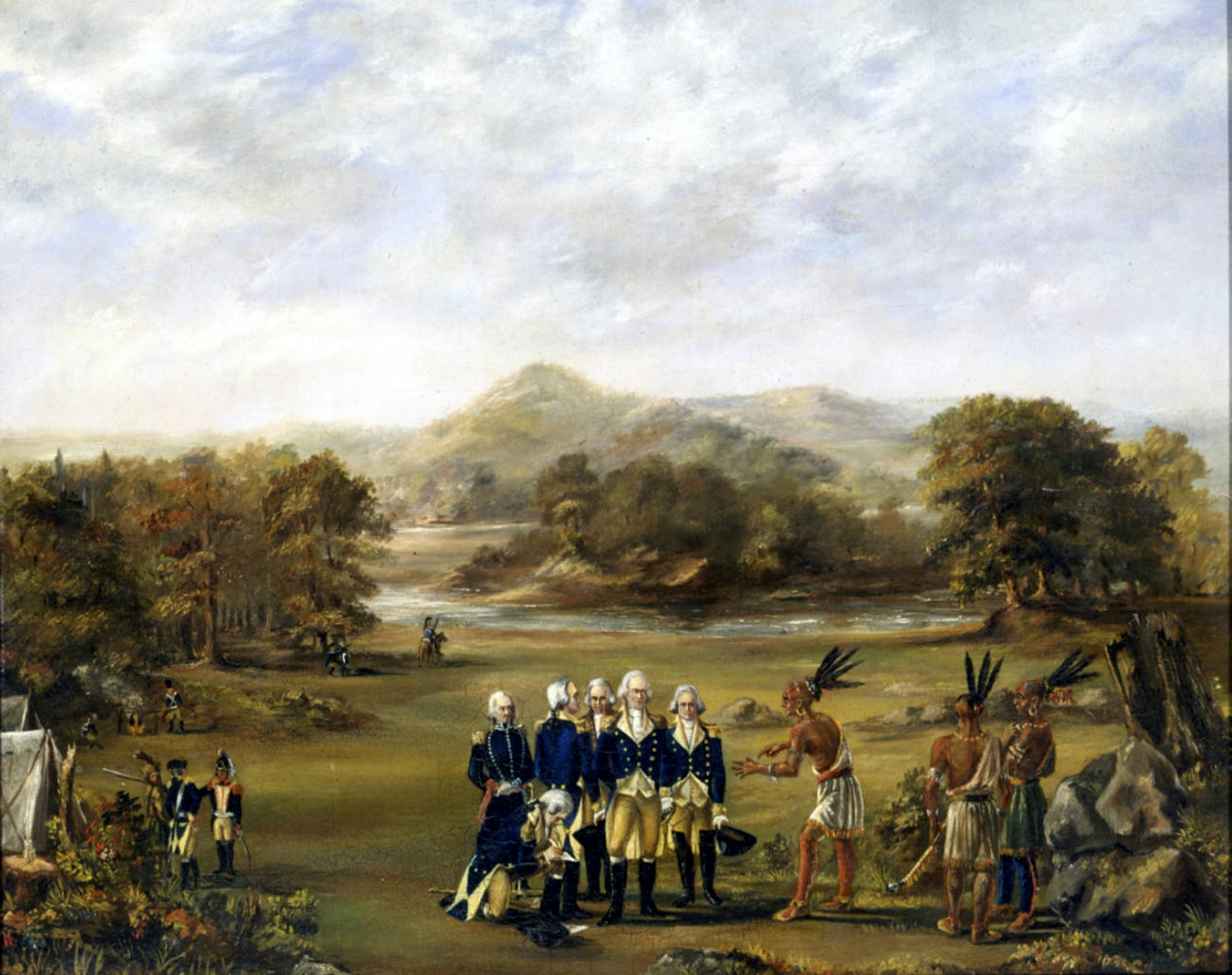
General Anthony Wayne negotiating the 1795 Treaty of Greenville with Natives. Kekewepelethy kept the majority of the Shawnees away from the treaty.

After the Treaty of Greenville, Kekewepelethy and his followers relocated to Swan Creek in what is now northern Ohio, where they maintained close ties to the British. In Kekewepelethy's absence, Blue Jacket presented Red Pole, his half-brother, to the Americans as the new Shawnee civil chief. In November 1796, Blue Jacket and Red Pole traveled to Philadelphia, where they met with President George Washington to discuss Native issues. Meanwhile, when nearby Fort Miami was turned over to the Americans by the British, Kekewepelethy moved to Bois Blanc Island and then Grosse Ile, which were still under British control. Around 1800 he resettled in northern Ohio along the Maumee River, and would occasionally lead trips into neighboring areas, such as a trip in 1807 to Russellville, KY to gather salt for the tribe. He does not appear in historical records after an 1808 illness, and presumably died around that time.

Kekewepelethy is sometimes confused with other Natives called "Captain Johnny," including a younger Shawnee sometimes known as "Big Captain Johnny," who served with Captain Logan (Spemica Lawba) as a scout for the Americans in the War of 1812. (Note: Kekewepelethy is sometimes described in secondary sources as "seven feet in height" and "as frightfully ugly as he was large", but this description referred to the "Big Captain Johnny" who served in the War of 1812; for the original quotes, see Consul Willshire Butterfield, An Historical Account of the Expedition against Sandusky under Col. William Crawford in 1782 (Cincinnati: Clarke, 1873), p. 211.) In his later years, American settlers sometimes called Kekewepelethy "King John" to distinguish him from the other Captain Johnny. Kekewepelethy had at least one son, Othowakasica ("Yellow Feather"), who signed the Treaty of Greenville (1814) and the Treaty of Fort Meigs (1817), and in the 1830s moved to Kansas with other Shawnees.
