= Algonquian peoples =

Native North American ethnic group

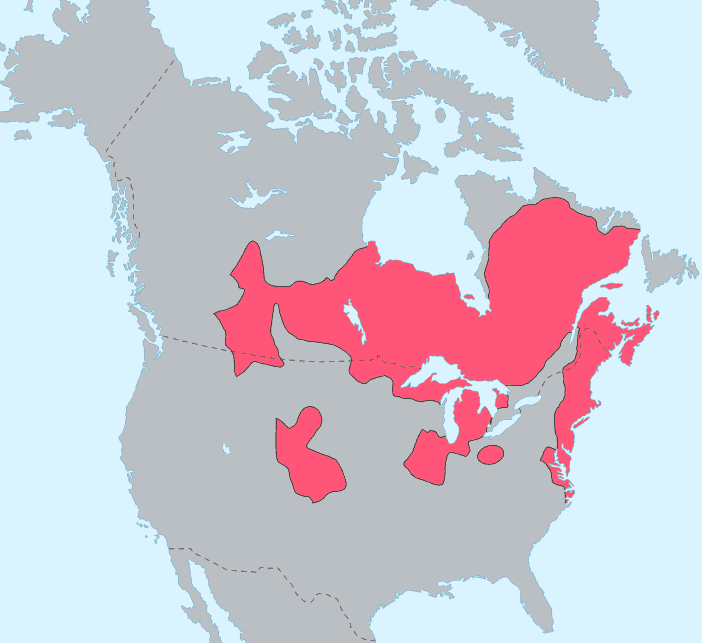
Algonquian-speaking peoples in North America before European settlement

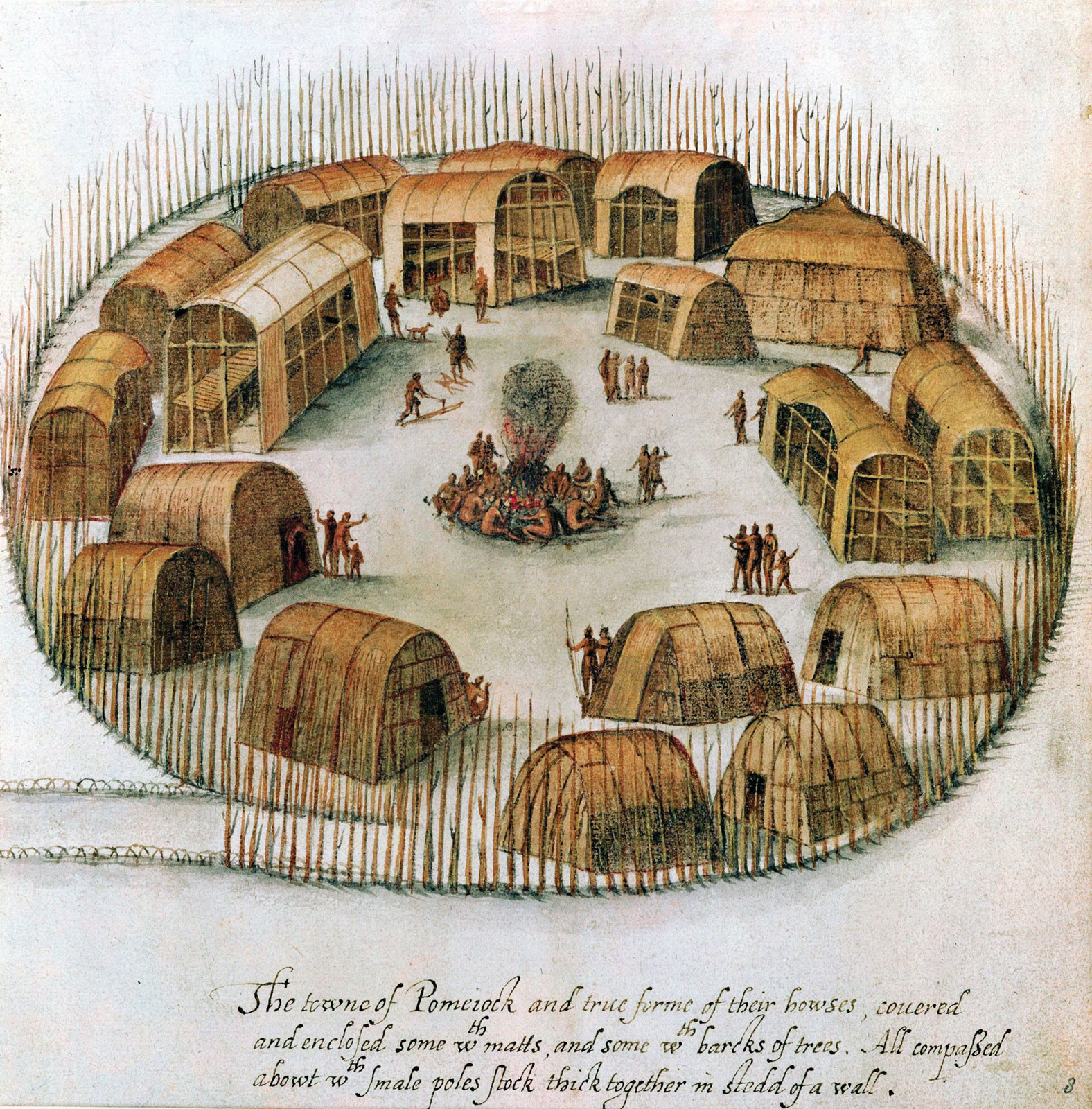
A 1585 sketch of the Algonquian village of Pomeiock near present-day Gibbs Creek in North Carolina.

The Algonquians, consisting of the peoples who speak Algonquian languages, are one of the most populous and widespread North American Indigenous American groups. They historically were prominent along the Atlantic Coast and in the interior regions along St. Lawrence River and around the Great Lakes.

== Culture ==
Before contact with Europeans, most Algonquian settlements lived by hunting and fishing, with many of them supplementing their diet by cultivating corn, beans and squash (the "Three Sisters"). The Ojibwe cultivated wild rice.

At the time of European arrival in North America, Algonquian peoples resided in present-day Canada east of the Rocky Mountains, New England, New Jersey, southeastern New York, Delaware, and down the Atlantic Coast to the Upper South, and around the Great Lakes in present-day Illinois, Indiana, Iowa, Michigan, Minnesota, and Wisconsin. The precise homelands of some Algonquian peoples are not known. At the time of European contact, the Haudenosaunee, based in present-day New York and Pennsylvania, were often at war with some of their Algonquian neighbors.

=== New England ===
Colonists in the Massachusetts Bay area first encountered the Wampanoag, Massachusett, Nipmuc, Pennacook, Penobscot, Passamaquoddy, and Quinnipiac. The Mohegan, Pequot, Pocumtuc, Podunk, Tunxis, and Narragansett were based in southern New England. The Abenaki were located in northern New England: present-day Maine, New Hampshire, and Vermont in what became the United States and eastern Quebec in what became Canada. They traded with French colonists who settled along the Atlantic coast and the Saint Lawrence River. The Mahican were located in western New England in the upper Hudson River Valley (around present-day Albany, New York). These groups cultivated crops, hunted, and fished.

The Algonquians of New England (who spoke Eastern Algonquian), practised a seasonal economy. The basic social unit was the village: a few hundred people related by a clan kinship structure. Villages were temporary and mobile. The people moved to locations of greatest natural food supply, often breaking into smaller units or gathering as the circumstances required. This custom resulted in a certain degree of intertribal mobility, especially in troubled times. Their communities were led by Sachems.

In warm weather, they constructed portable wigwams, a type of hut usually with buckskin doors. In the winter, they erected the larger longhouses, in which more than one clan could reside. They cached food supplies in more permanent, semi-subterranean structures.

In the spring, when the fish were spawning, they left the winter camps to build villages at coastal locations and waterfalls. In March, they caught smelt in nets and weirs, moving about in birch bark canoes. In April, they netted alewife, sturgeon and salmon. In May, they caught cod with hook and line in the ocean; and trout, smelt, striped bass and flounder in the estuaries and streams. Putting out to sea, they hunted whales, porpoises, walruses and seals. They gathered scallops, mussels, clams and crabs and, in southern New Jersey, harvested clams year-round.

From April through October, natives hunted migratory birds and their eggs: Canada geese, brant, mourning doves and others. In July and August they gathered strawberries, raspberries, blueberries and nuts. In September, they split into small groups and moved up the streams to the forest. There, they hunted beaver, caribou, moose and white-tailed deer.

In December, when the snows began, the people created larger winter camps in sheltered locations, where they built or reconstructed longhouses. February and March were lean times. The tribes in southern New England and other northern latitudes had to rely on cached food. Northerners developed a practice of going hungry for several days at a time. Historians hypothesize that this practice kept the population down, with some invoking Liebig's law of the minimum.

The southern Algonquians of New England relied predominantly on slash and burn agriculture. They cleared fields by burning for one or two years of cultivation, after which the village moved to another location. This is the reason the English found the region relatively cleared and ready for planting. By using various kinds of native corn (maize), beans and squash, southern New England natives were able to improve their diet to such a degree that their population increased and they reached a density of 287 people per 100 square miles as opposed to 41 in the north.

Scholars estimate that, by the year 1600, the indigenous population of New England had reached 70,000–100,000.

=== Midwest ===
The French encountered many Algonquian peoples during their colonization of the region along the Mississippi and Ohio rivers. The historic peoples of the Illinois Country were the Shawnee, Illiniwek, Kickapoo, Menominee, Miami, Sauk and Meskwaki. The latter were also known as the Sac and Fox, and later known as the Meskwaki Indians, who lived throughout the present-day Midwest of the United States.

During the nineteenth century, many Native Americans were displaced west of the Mississippi River. They were forced to travel over great distances under Indian removal legislation passed by the United States Government. The government designated these lands west of the Mississippi River as Indian Territory. After the US extinguished Indian land claims, this area was admitted as the state of Oklahoma in the early 20th century.

=== Upper west ===
The Ojibwe, Odawa, Potawatomi, and some Cree groups live in the Upper Peninsula of Michigan, Western Ontario, Wisconsin, Minnesota, and the Canadian Prairies. The Arapaho, Blackfoot and Cheyenne are indigenous to the Great Plains.

== List of Algonquian-speaking nations ==
- Abenaki
- Algonquin
- Anishinaabe
  - Algonquin
  - Odawa
  - Ojibwe
    - Anisininew (Oji-Cree)
    - Mississaugas
    - Nipissing
    - Saulteaux
  - Missiquoi
  - Potawatomi
- Arapaho
- Beothuk
- Blackfoot
  - Kainai
  - Piegan
  - Siksika
- Cheyenne
- Chowanoke
- Cree
  - Plains Cree
- Croatan
- Gros Ventre
- Illiniwek Confederacy
  - Cahokia
  - Chepoussa
  - Chinkoa
  - Coiracoentanon
  - Espeminka
  - Kaskaskia
  - Metchigamea
  - Moingwena
  - Peoria
  - Tamaroa
  - Tapourao
- Kickapoo
- Lenape
  - Munsee
    - Wappinger
  - Unami
- Mascouten
- Massachusett
- Menominee
- Meskwaki
- Miami
  - Piankeshaw
  - Wea
- Montaukett
- Mohegan
- Mohican
- Nanticoke
- Narragansett
- Niantic
- Nipmuc
- Noquet
- Pamlico
- Pennacook
- Pequot
- Piscataway Confederacy
  - Nacotchtank
- Powhatan Confederacy
  - Pamunkey
  - Powhatan
- Roanoke
- Sauk
- Secotan
- Shawnee
  - Chalahgawtha
  - Hathawekela
  - Kispoko
  - Mekoche
  - Pekowi
- Wampanoag Confederacy
  - Patuxet
- Wabanaki Confederacy
  - Abenaki
  - Miꞌkmaq
  - Passamaquoddy
  - Penobscot
  - Wolastoqiyik
- Wangunk
  - Mattabessett
  - Paugussett
  - Podunk
  - Quinnipiac
  - Tunxis
  - Unquachog
- Weapemeoc

== See also ==
- Doctors Dean R. Snow and William A. Starna – Archeologists and historians who have conducted archeological research in the Mohawk Valley and other Algonquian and Iroquoian sites.
- Iroquoian peoples
- Sagaiguninini – An alleged sub-nation that existed at least from 1630 to 1640.
