= Snake (Shawnee leader) =

Name of two Shawnee leaders

Peteusha
- Died: c. 1813 present-day Wapakoneta, Ohio
- Other names: Captain Snake; Blacksnake; Old Snake; John Snake
- Citizenship: Shawnee
- Years active: 1774–1812
- Known for: Military leader in the Ohio Country

Shemanetoo
- Died: late 1830s present-day Kansas
- Other names: Big Snake; Young Snake; Thomas Snake
- Citizenship: Shawnee
- Years active: 1781–1817
- Known for: Signatory of several treaties

Snake was the English language name of two Shawnee leaders prominent in the history of the Ohio Country: Peteusha (died c. 1813) and Shemanetoo (died 1830s). They were both commonly referred to as "Snake" in historical records, or by variations such as "Black Snake" or "Captain Snake," so it is often difficult to determine which individual was being referred to. On a number of occasions, the two Snakes both signed a letter or appeared together, so it is clear they were two different people. There may have been additional Shawnees called "Snake," further complicating the matter. According to historian John Sugden, "it is unlikely if the biographies of these chiefs will ever be completely disentangled."

Nothing is known of Peteusha's and Shemanetoo's early lives. They were apparently brothers. In 1781, missionary John Heckewelder wrote of "the two Shawano Captains known by the Name of the Snakes [John and Thomas],” which apparently refers to Peteusha and Shemanetoo. In a 1785 document they were recorded as "Major Snake" and "Thomas Snake." Shawnees of their era belonged to one of five tribal divisions; the Snake brothers may have belonged to the Kispoko division. The Shawnee warrior Spemica Lawba (Captain Logan), who fought on the American side in the War of 1812, was a cousin.

== Peteusha ==
Peteusha was the older and more prominent Shawnee leader. His name has been spelled in a variety of ways, including Peteasua, Pataso, Petazo, Patasua, and Ptasua. He first appears in historical records at the time of Dunmore's War in 1774. The war arose after Sir William Johnson negotiated the 1768 Treaty of Fort Stanwix with the Haudenosaunee, which ceded lands south of the Ohio River (present-day West Virginia and Kentucky) to the British. Although Shawnees used this land for hunting, they had not been consulted in the negotiations. Clashes between colonists and Natives erupted as settlers and land speculators poured into the region. Shawnees began organizing other Natives in an effort to defend their hunting grounds against British colonization. British officials successfully prevented other Natives from joining the war, leaving them with only about 300 Shawnee, Mingo, Lenape, and Wyandot warriors to oppose 2,300 men led by Lord Dunmore, the royal governor of Virginia.

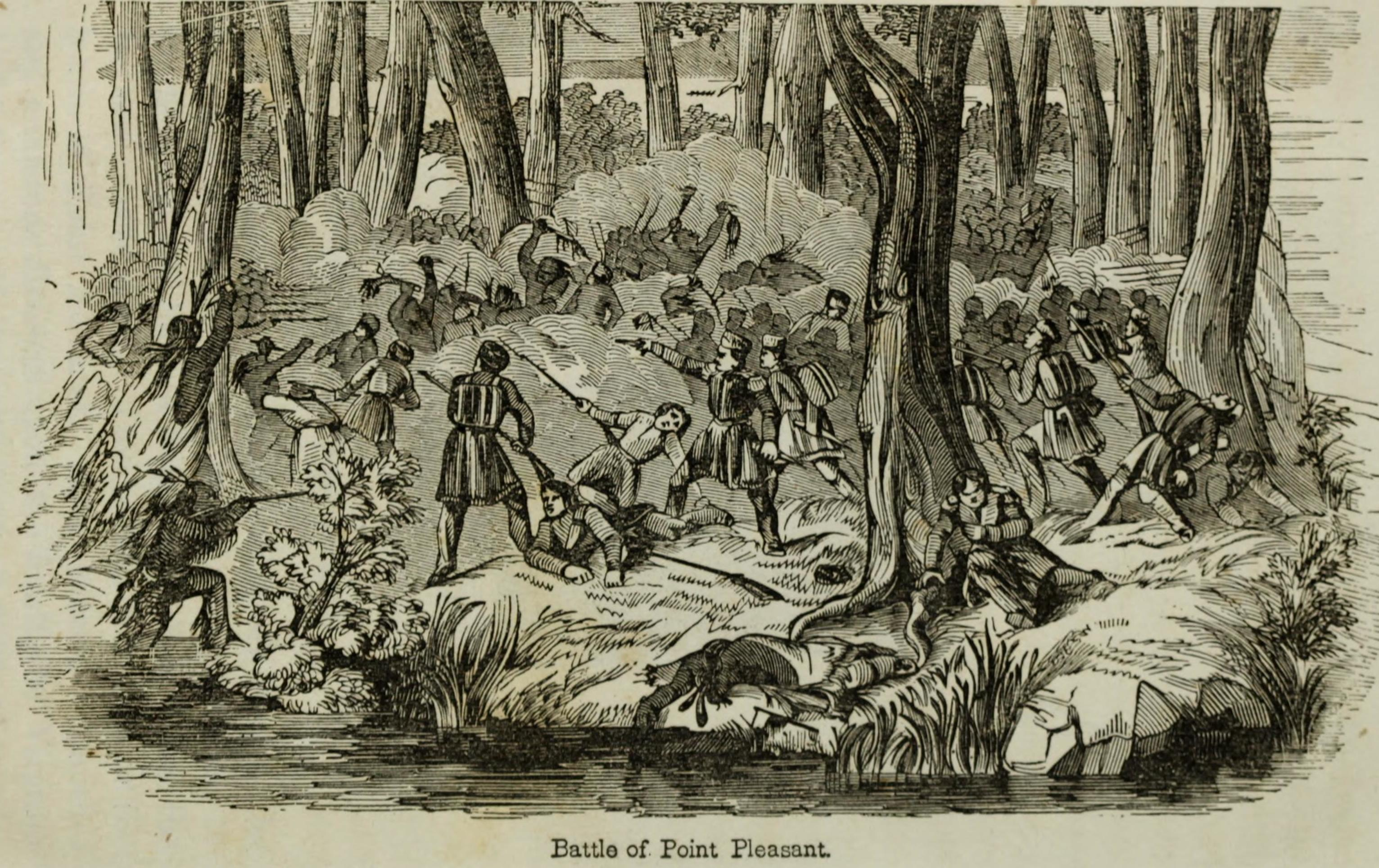
Peteusha fought in the Battle of Point Pleasant in 1774.

At the time of the Dunmore's War, Peteusha resided at Snake's Town, located on the Muskingum River in the Ohio Country. In August 1774, colonial militiamen led by Angus McDonald invaded the Ohio Country and destroyed several Native towns, including Snake's Town. Soon after, Dunmore launched another invasion, with him leading one wing, Colonel Andrew Lewis in command of the other. Cornstalk, the principal Shawnee war chief, decided to strike at Lewis's wing before the two armies could unite, initiating the Battle of Point Pleasant on October 10. Peteusha was among Cornstalk's war chiefs, as were Blue Jacket and Pukeshinwau. The Shawnees initially had the upper hand, but when colonial reinforcements arrived, the outnumbered Shawnees were pushed back. Near sundown, the Shawnees withdrew back across the Ohio River.

Shawnee resistance to American occupation continued in the American Revolutionary War (1775–1783), which in the Ohio Country was fought between American settlers and Natives, with Natives getting support from their British allies in Detroit. By 1779 Peteusha was recognized as one of the leading Shawnee war chiefs. Along with Kekewepelethy (Captain Johnny) and Shemanetoo, he became a prominent military leader at Wakatomika, a Shawnee town on the Mad River near present-day Zanesfield, Ohio. Inhabited by Shawnees and Mingos, Wakatomika became a center of resistance to American expansion. In 1782, Peteusha led Shawnees in the victory over Colonel William Crawford's army during the Crawford expedition.

After the Revolutionary War, the United States claimed the lands north of the Ohio River by right of conquest. Although the Mekoche division of the Shawnee tribe sought to establish peace with the new United States, the Shawnee leaders at Wakatomika remained wary, refusing to acknowledge that they had lost their Ohio lands. In 1785, Peteusha, Kekewepelethy, and Shemanetoo sent a message to the British in Detroit, alerting them that the resumption of war with the United States remained a possibility. Violence between Shawnees and settlers continued, even after the Americans had compelled some Shawnee leaders, mostly Mekoches, to sign the 1786 Treaty of Fort Finney. A new war, the Northwest Indian War, had begun. After Americans destroyed the Shawnee towns along the Mad River in 1786, Peteusha established a new town along the Maumee River, near modern Fort Wayne, Indiana. This new town was near a number of other Native towns, including Kekionga, the principal town of the Miamis, who became important Shawnee allies in the struggle against American expansion.

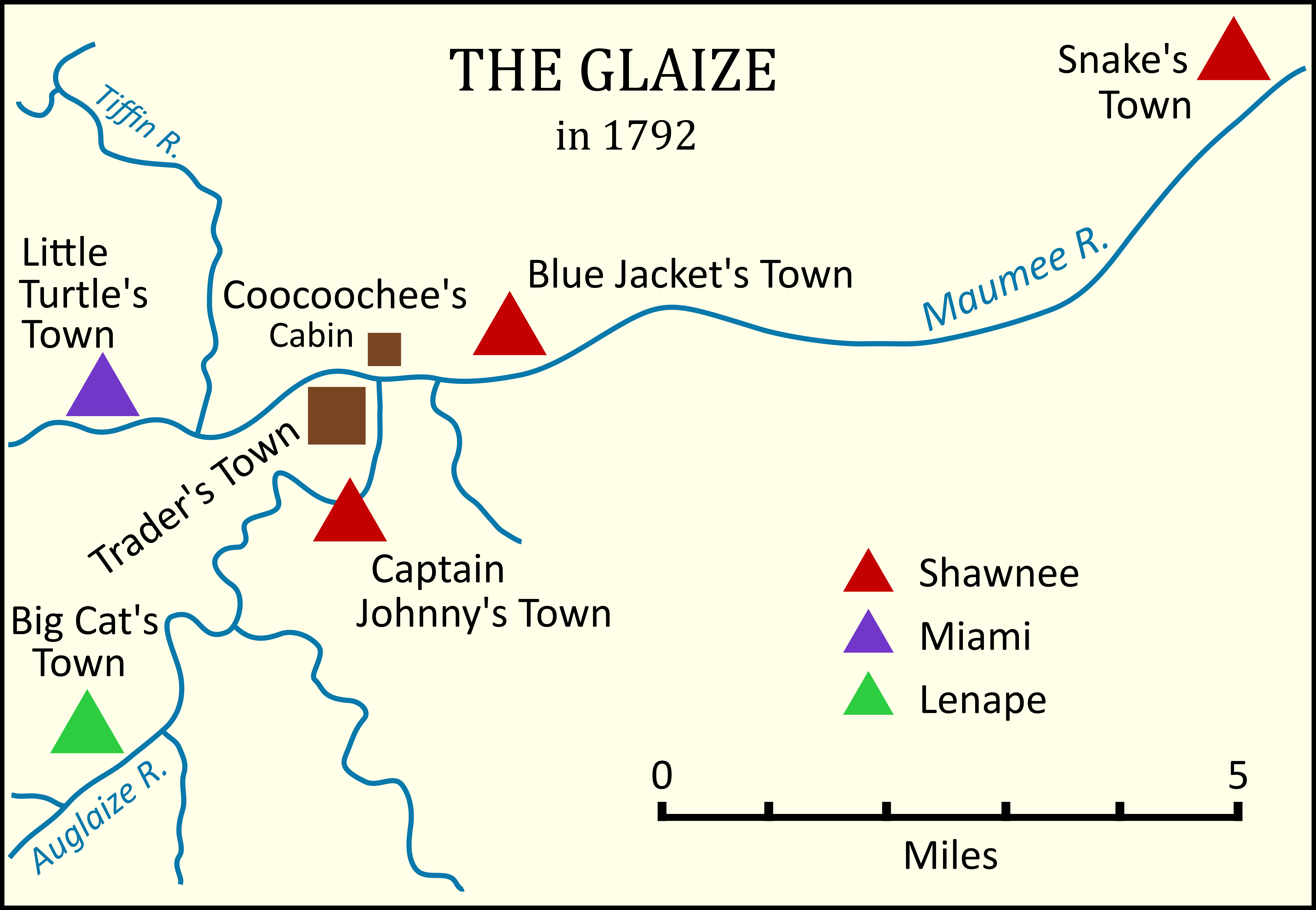
Native towns at the Glaize in 1792

In 1787, the United States designated the Native lands north of the Ohio River as its Northwest Territory. Hoping to stem the tide of American immigrants flooding into the region, Peteusha led about one hundred Shawnees, Mingos, and Cherokees in raids against American settlers in Kentucky or traveling by flatboat on the Ohio River. Among Peteusha's men was Tecumseh, who achieved his first success as a warrior in a 1788 attack on a flatboat. The success of these raids contributed to the decision by the United States to send a military expedition under General Josiah Harmar against the Natives in 1790. Harmar's men were defeated by warriors led by Blue Jacket and Little Turtle; Peteusha likely took part in those actions. Peteusha also traveled widely as a diplomat, working with the British and the Natives of the Northwestern Confederacy.

Although Harmar had been defeated, his forces destroyed the Miami and Shawnee towns around Kekionga, which had been abandoned as he approached. In 1792, Peteusha established a new town on the Auglaize River, near a cluster of Native towns known as "The Glaize", which became the new headquarters of the Northwestern Confederacy. In 1794, these towns were also abandoned when a new American army led by General Anthony Wayne approached. Wayne defeated the Northwestern Confederacy at the Battle of Fallen Timbers on August 20, 1794. Some Shawnees leaders, including Blue Jacket, Black Hoof (Catecahassa), and Red Pole (Musquaconocah), decided to make peace, signing the Treaty of Greenville in 1795, ceding what is now southern and eastern Ohio to the United States. Kekewepelethy, who had emerged in the war as the principal civil chief of the Shawnees, refused to make peace and kept most Shawnees from attending the treaty council. Peteusha apparently followed suit, and did not sign the treaty.

After the war, Peteusha eventually settled in Wapakoneta, the new Shawnee capital on the Auglaize River. There he supported Black Hoof's efforts to encourage Shawnees to adopt some American-style practices to better coexist with their white neighbors. In 1805, a new movement arose led by Tenskwatawa, the Shawnee Prophet, and his brother Tecumseh. They attracted hundreds of converts to a movement that rejected Black Hoof's accommodationist program. Like most Ohio Shawnees, Peteusha disavowed Tenskwatawa's movement. In 1807, Tenskwatawa accused several Wapakoneta chiefs of witchcraft, including Peteusha and Black Hoof, which could have prompted Tenskwatawa's followers to attempt to assassinate them. The matter was resolved without violence, and Peteusha's final years were apparently uneventful. He seems to have died around 1813.

== Shemanetoo ==
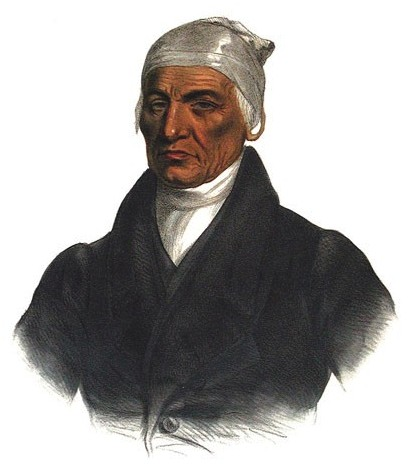
Black Hoof (Catecahassa) was the principal spokesman for the Ohio Shawnees. Shemanetoo was related to him by marriage.

Shemanetoo (or Shemeneto) was younger and less well-known than Peteusha. He had a daughter named Nenexse (born about 1797), who married Black Hoof, although in another account, it was Shemanetoo who married Black Hoof's daughter.

When the War of 1812 came to Ohio, most Shawnees did not support Tecumseh and his British allies, but instead sought to remain neutral. As the war progressed, American leaders put pressure on the neutral Shawnees leaders to choose a side. Black Hoof and another prominent Shawnee chief, Captain Lewis, agreed to lend their aid to the Americans. On November 25, 1812, Captain Logan (Spemica Lawba), a cousin of the Snake brothers, died after fighting in a skirmish while serving in the army of American General William Henry Harrison. In August 1813, Shemanetoo and Captain Lewis joined more than 200 Shawnee and Lenape warriors for Harrison's invasion of Upper Canada, serving as scouts and skirmishers. Shemanetoo and the Shawnees were present at the Battle of the Thames on October 5, 1813, in which Tecumseh was killed. The American-allied Shawnees were still encircling the British position when the Americans charged, and so the battle was over before Shemanetoo and his fellow warriors were engaged. Although Tecumseh is popularly associated with Shawnee resistance to the United States, more Shawnees served in Harrison's army at the Battle of the Thames than alongside Tecumseh.

As the war turned in the Americans' favor, they sought to gain the loyalty of Natives who had been fighting for the British with the Treaty of Greenville (1814). Lewis and other American-allied Shawnees were present, and Shemanetoo put his mark on the treaty, where his name was written as "Shammonetho, or Snake." At the end of the war, Lewis, Black Hoof, and other Shawnees signed the Treaty of Spring Wells on September 8, 1815, which confirmed that the Shawnees still owned the land guaranteed to them in the 1795 Treaty of Greenville. Shemanetoo signed the treaty as "Shemenetoo, or big snake."

The American population in Ohio continued to rise after the War of 1812, increasing pressure on the Shawnees to cede their territory and move west of the Mississippi. In the 1817 Treaty of Fort Meigs, Shawnee other leaders ceded northwestern Ohio to the United States in exchange for carefully delineated reservations. Shemanetoo signed this treaty as "Shemenetu, or Big Snake." The Treaty of Fort Meigs created three small Shawnee reservations in Ohio: Wapakoneta, Lewistown, and Hog Creek, encompassing about 170 square miles (440 km^{2}). The Treaty of Fort Meigs met with opposition in the United States Senate. Senators disliked the notion of Natives holding land in fee simple, and so they instructed U.S. officials to renegotiate the treaty. A supplemental agreement, the 1818 Treaty of St. Mary's, was created with language that made clear the U.S. government still ultimately controlled the land, and if Shawnees sold the land, they could only sell it to the U.S. government. Shemanetoo also signed this supplemental treaty as "Shemenetu, or Big Snake."

Although the Ohio Shawnees now had reservations, white settlers continued to poach on their lands. Shawnees leaders sought to secure patents in fee simple to their lands, but their request was denied by the U.S. government. Officials in Washington now favored a policy of Indian removal, which encouraged Natives to cede their lands to the government and resettle west of the Mississippi. Shemanetoo eventually moved west, and apparently died in present-day Kansas in the late 1830s.
