= Cornstalk (Shawnee leader) =

Shawnee leader in the American Revolution

- Hokoleskwa
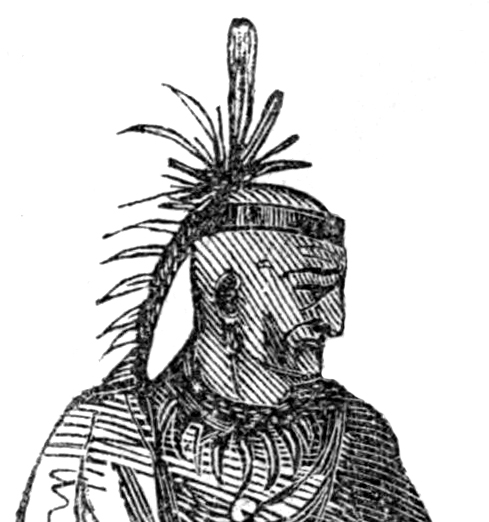
- Detail of Cornstalk as illustrated in John Frost’s Pictorial History of Indians (1873)
- Died: November 10, 1777; Fort Randolph, Virginia (now West Virginia)
- Cause of death: Murdered while imprisoned
- Burial place: Point Pleasant, West Virginia
- Other names: Colesquo, Keightughqua
- Known for: Shawnee war leader
- Relatives: Nonhelema (sister)

Cornstalk (c. 1727? – November 10, 1777) was a Shawnee leader in the Ohio Country in the 1760s and 1770s. His name in the Shawnee language was Hokoleskwa. Little is known about his early life. He may have been born in the Province of Pennsylvania. In 1763, he reportedly led a raid against British American colonists in Pontiac's War. He first appears in historical documents in 1764, when he was one of the hostages surrendered to the British as part of the peace negotiations ending Pontiac's War.

When the British American colonies began expanding into the Ohio Country, Cornstalk played a major part in the defense of the Shawnee homeland. He was the primary Shawnee war chief in Lord Dunmore's War (1774), leading Shawnees and other Native warriors against colonists in the Battle of Point Pleasant. After suffering defeat in that battle, he became an advocate for Shawnee neutrality in the American Revolutionary War, which began in 1775. Many Shawnees fought against the Americans, hoping to regain lost lands, but Cornstalk was among those who feared that fighting the Americans would prove disastrous for the Shawnees.

In 1777, Cornstalk made a diplomatic visit to Fort Randolph in Virginia (now West Virginia), hoping to learn American intentions. He and three others were imprisoned by the fort's commander. When an American militiaman was killed by Natives in the fort's vicinity, angry soldiers executed Cornstalk and the other prisoners. His murder enraged Shawnees and deprived them of an important voice of moderation.

== Biography ==
=== Background and early life ===
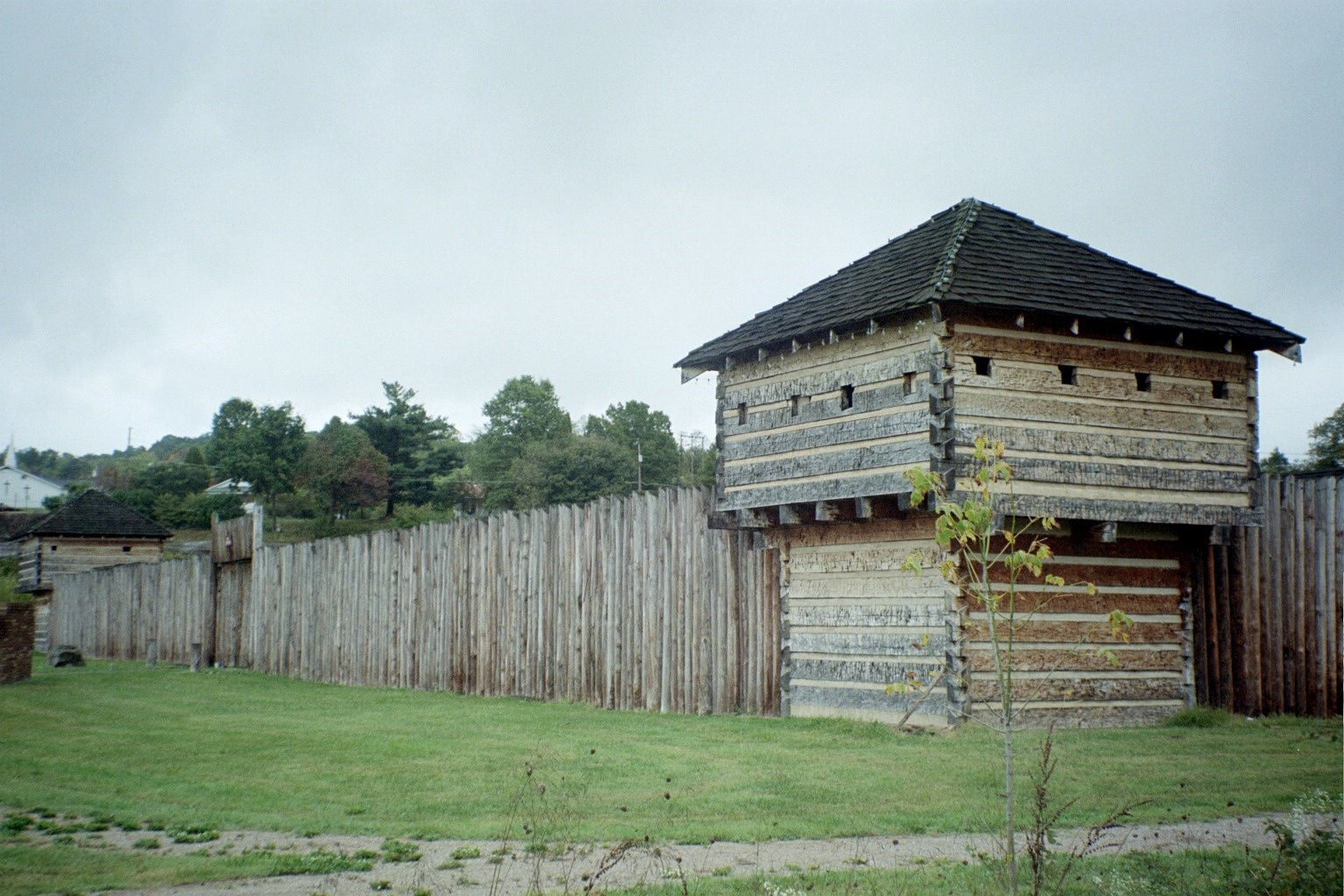
Replica of Fort Randolph in Point Pleasant, West Virginia. The original, built on the site of the Battle of Point Pleasant, was where Cornstalk was murdered.

Little is known of Cornstalk's early life, as he does not clearly appear in historical records until 1764. His year of birth is unknown; some early writings estimate it at 1720, although this date is undocumented. His name in the Shawnee language, Hokoleskwa ("a blade of corn"), was also recorded in colonial records as Colesqua, Keightughqua, and Semachquaan, with several spelling variations.

In the 1680s, decades before Cornstalk's birth, the Shawnees were driven out of the Ohio Country by the Iroquois. One Shawnee band resettled in the Wyoming Valley along the Susquehanna River in the Province of Pennsylvania, near present-day Plymouth. A leader of this group was Paxinosa, a noted Shawnee chief. Moravian missionaries who knew Cornstalk said he was Paxinosa's son or grandson, so Cornstalk might have been born in that area. Shawnees of Cornstalk's era belonged to one of five tribal divisions: Mekoche, Chalahgawtha (Chillicothe), Kispoko, Pekowi, and Hathawekela. Like Paxinosa, Cornstalk belonged to the Mekoche division.

When fighting in the French and Indian War came to Pennsylvania in 1755, Paxinosa's band remained neutral. In 1758, seeking to avoid the conflict, they relocated to the Ohio Country, establishing a new town, Wakatomika, on the Muskingum River, with other Shawnee refugees. Some Ohio Shawnees took part in the war. Many years later, Cornstalk was said to have led a 1759 raid into Virginia, although stories about his participation in that raid may be apocryphal. Cornstalk may have fought in Pontiac's War (1763–1766), a pan-tribal effort to counter British control of the Ohio Country. He is said to have led a 1763 raiding party into Virginia (now West Virginia). He first appears in historical records in 1764, when he took part in negotiations with Colonel Henry Bouquet. He was one of the hostages surrendered by the tribe to ensure compliance with the peace. Fearful for his safety, Cornstalk escaped and returned home.

The Ohio Shawnees had initially been concentrated in two major towns, Wakatomica on the Muskingum and Lower Shawneetown on the Ohio River. In 1758, Lower Shawneetown was abandoned in favor of multiple, smaller towns up the Scioto River. In the 1760s, Cornstalk established his own town on the Scioto, as did his sister, Nonhelema, known to colonists as the "Grenadier Squaw." Cornstalk's brothers Nimwha and Silver Heels were also notable Shawnee leaders. Cornstalk had at least two children, sons Cutemwha (The Wolf) and Allanawissica (also called Elinipsico). In the 1780s, Cutemwha (also known as Piaseka or Biaseka), would emerge an important Shawnee chief.

=== Lord Dunmore's War ===
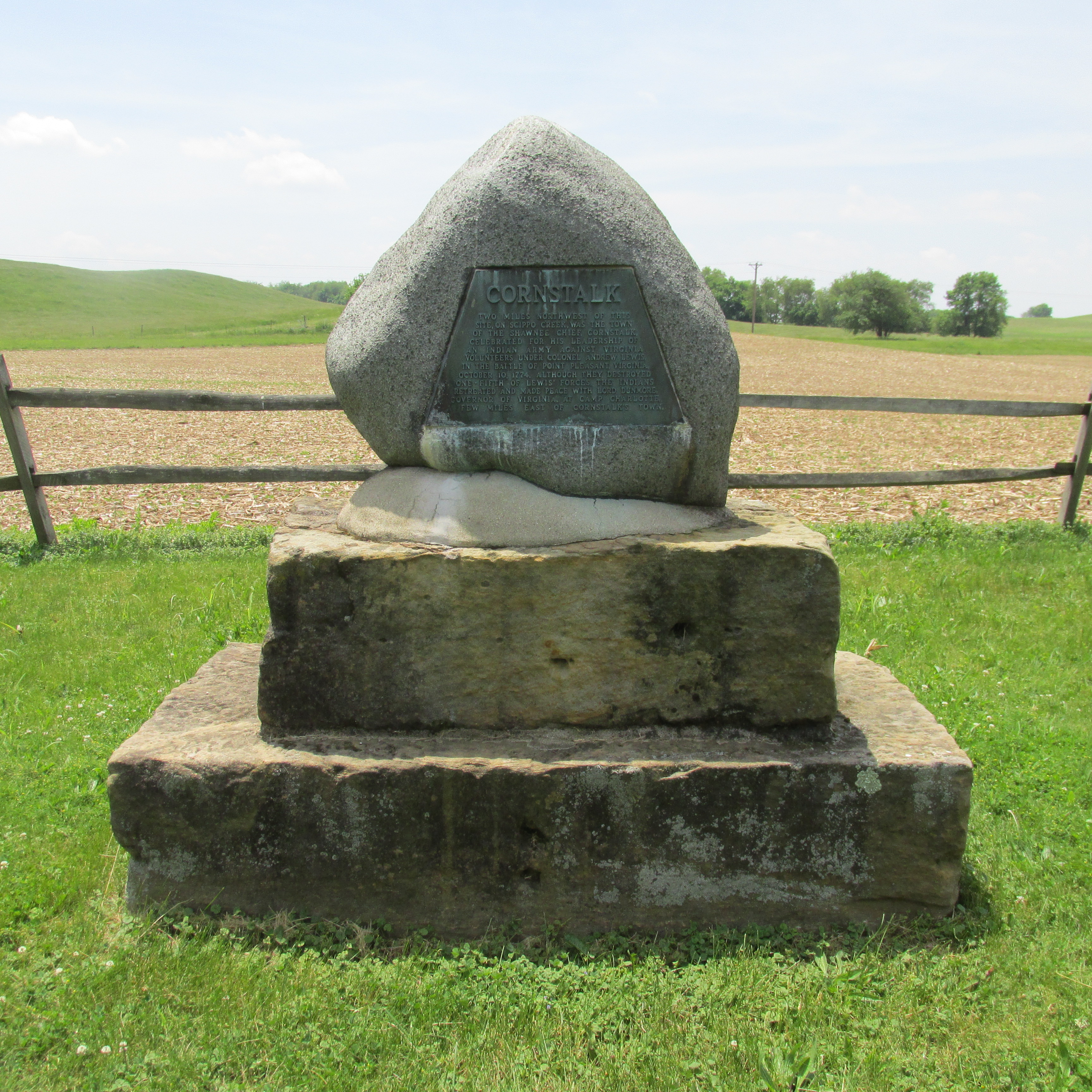
Cornstalk monument located at Logan Elm State Memorial in Pickaway County, Ohio

During Pontiac's War, the British issued the Royal Proclamation of 1763, which created a boundary between the British colonies and Native land in the west. This boundary did not last long: in the 1768 Treaty of Fort Stanwix, Sir William Johnson negotiated a new boundary line with the Iroquois, ceding lands south of the Ohio River (present-day West Virginia and Kentucky) to the British. Although Shawnees used this land for hunting, they had not been consulted in the negotiations. Clashes between settlers and Indians erupted after 1769 as settlers and land speculators poured into the region. Shawnees began organizing other Natives in an effort to defend their hunting grounds against British colonization. In 1773, Cornstalk warned Thomas Bullitt against surveying the region.

The issue became a crisis in 1774 after at least ten Mingo Indians were murdered by white settlers in the Yellow Creek massacre. Mingos retaliated against settlers, and war seemed imminent. At Fort Pitt, John Connolly, agent for Lord Dunmore, the royal governor of Virginia, called out the militia. Cornstalk worked to prevent the escalation of violence. He sent his brother Silver Heels to escort several British traders from the Shawnee towns to safety in Fort Pitt. While at Fort Pitt, Silver Heels was shot and seriously wounded by local militiamen. Lord Dunmore's War had begun.

Cornstalk was not the principal chief of the Shawnees, as is sometimes thought. Shawnees lived in autonomous towns with no central government, but in the 1760s they began appointing a ceremonial leader (or "principal chief") from the Mekoche division to speak for them in negotiations with colonial leaders. The principal chief in Cornstalk's day was the Mekoche Chief Kisinoutha (Hard Man). According to Shawnee custom, in time of war, civil chiefs like Kisinoutha yielded leadership to their war chiefs. Now Cornstalk, as head warrior, took command, leading war chiefs that included Blue Jacket, Black Snake (Peteusha), and Pukeshinwau.

The Shawnees and Mingos were greatly outnumbered by the Virginians, so Cornstalk tried to recruit Native allies in the face of an imminent invasion. British officials successfully prevented other Indians from joining the war, leaving Cornstalk with only about 300 Shawnee, Mingo, Delaware, and Wyandot warriors to oppose Dunmore's 2,300 men. Dunmore launched a two-prong invasion of the Ohio Country, with him leading one wing, Colonel Andrew Lewis in command of the other. Cornstalk decided to strike at Lewis's wing before the two armies could unite, initiating the Battle of Point Pleasant on October 10. During the intense, day-long battle, Virginians heard Cornstalk encouraging his men to "be strong, be strong!" The Shawnees initially had the upper hand, but when colonial reinforcements arrived, the outnumbered Shawnees were pushed back. Near sundown, Cornstalk finally withdrew his warriors across the Ohio River.

As Dunmore's armies continued to advance into the Ohio Country, some warriors wished to continue fighting. Cornstalk chastised them, saying, "then let us kill all our women and children, and go fight till we die." Cornstalk arranged to meet Dunmore and negotiate an end to the brief war. At the Treaty of Camp Charlotte, Cornstalk apparently accepted the Ohio River as the boundary of Shawnee lands. He surrendered four hostages, including his son, to ensure compliance with the terms. A Virginia officer, Col. Benjamin Wilson, wrote of Cornstalk's speech to Lord Dunmore at Camp Charlotte: "I have heard the first orators in Virginia, Patrick Henry and Richard Henry Lee, but never have I heard one whose powers of delivery surpassed those of Cornstalk on that occasion."

=== American Revolution ===
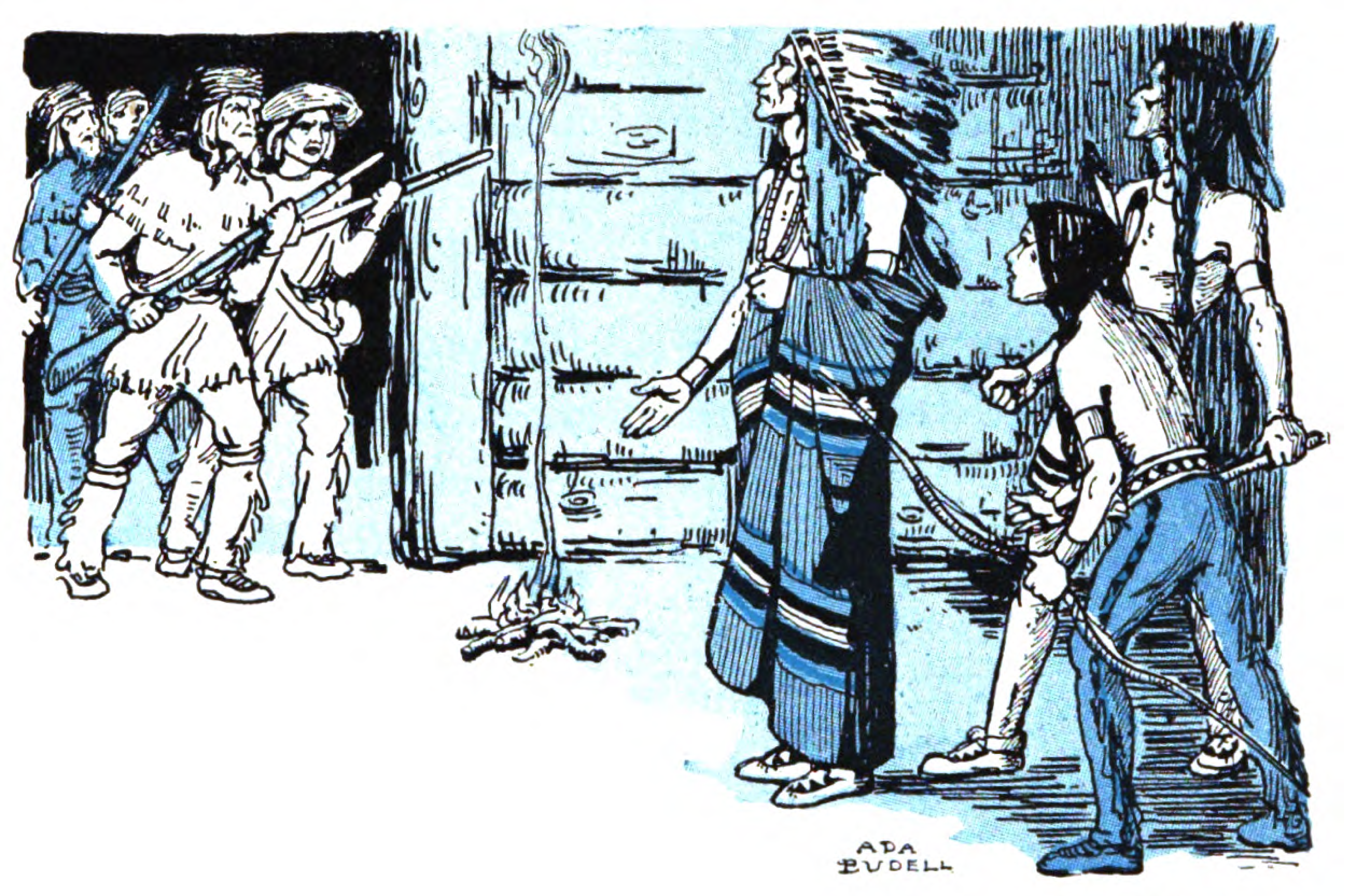
Illustration of Cornstalk about to be murdered, from a 1920 children's book

When the American Revolutionary War followed shortly after Dunmore's War, Cornstalk endeavored to keep his people neutral. In October 1775, Cornstalk, Nimwha, and other Mekoches represented the Shawnees in 1775 at a council held at Fort Pitt, seeking to maintain peaceful relations with the Americans.

In the summer of 1776, he also visited the British in Detroit, hoping to establish friendly relations with them as well. Many Shawnees, nevertheless, hoped to use British aid to reclaim their lands lost to the Americans. Shawnees sent emissaries south to the Cherokees at Chota (present Tennessee) to seek aid. A young Cherokee chief, Dragging Canoe, accepted the call to arms. Shawnees and Cherokees began cooperating in a war against the Americans.

In the autumn of 1776, Cornstalk returned to Fort Pitt, where he told U.S. Indian agent George Morgan that although some young Shawnee warriors were acting rashly, his people were committed to peace. Cornstalk had Morgan send a message to the Continental Congress, outlining Shawnee grievances and offering friendship. In the meantime, Cornstalk said he had decided to remove his followers to Coshocton, a neutral Delaware Indian town on the Tuscarawas River. By the winter of 1776, Shawnees were effectively divided between Cornstalk's neutral faction and militant bands led by such men as Blackfish. Although Cornstalk, Kisinoutha and other Mekoche leaders had made peace with the Virginians at Camp Charlotte, the other Shawnee divisions did not all agree with the loss of their hunting grounds and pursued their own agendas.

In October 1777, two Shawnees visited Fort Randolph, an American fort that had been built at the site of the Battle of Point Pleasant (present-day Point Pleasant, West Virginia). They were detained by the fort's commander, Matthew Arbuckle, who had decided to hold hostage any Shawnees who fell into his hands. Cornstalk's son Elinipsico (Allanawissica) arrived a few days later to ask why they were being held. Cornstalk came to the fort soon after, and all four were detained. On November 10, an American militiaman stationed at the fort was killed by unknown Indians in the vicinity. In retaliation, angry soldiers brutally executed Cornstalk, Elinipsico, and the other two Shawnees.

=== Aftermath of murder ===
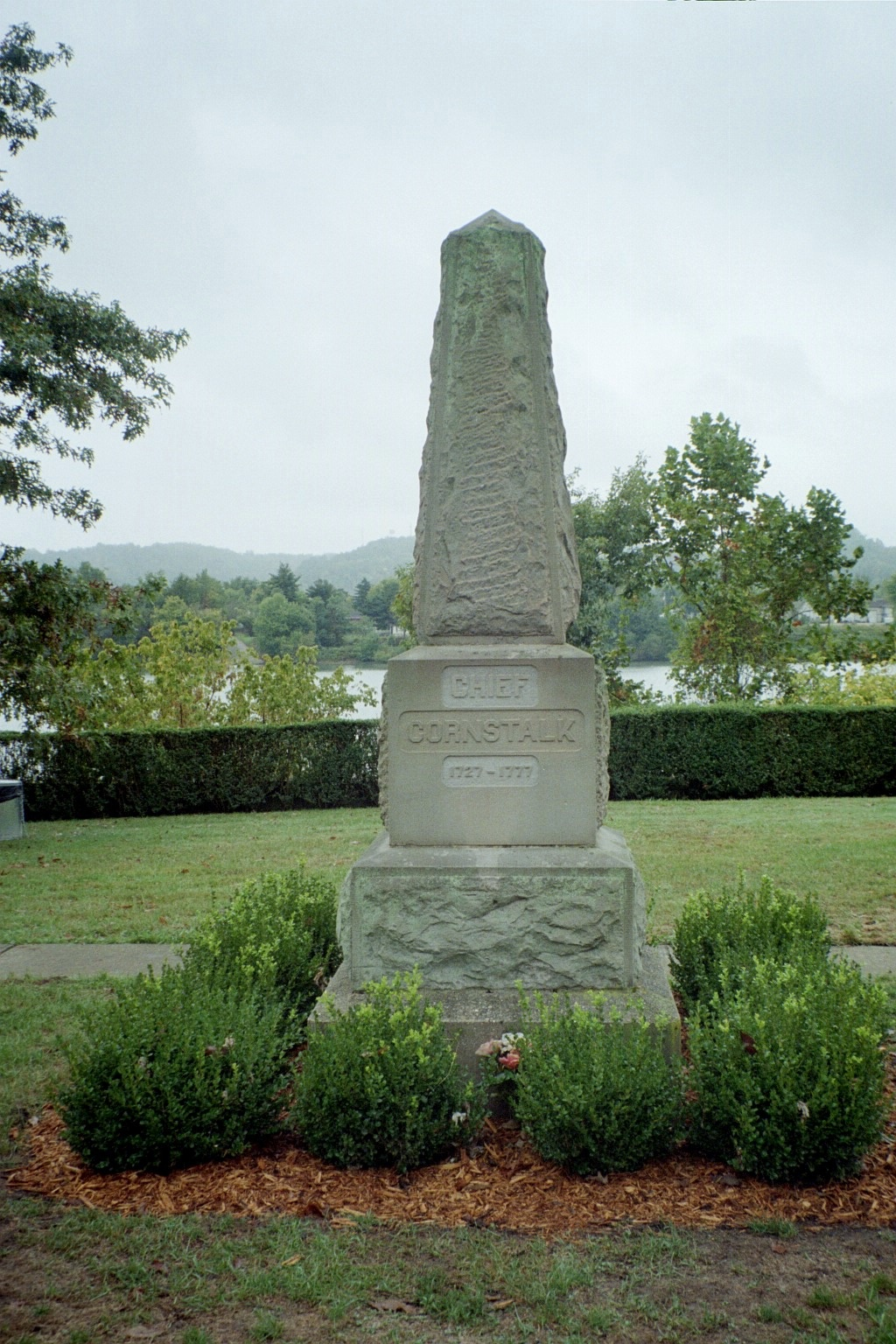
Cornstalk's gravesite in Point Pleasant, West Virginia

According to historian John Sudgen, "The significance of Cornstalk's death has been misinterpreted." Cornstalk's murder did not cause the Shawnees to go to war against the Americans, as is sometimes believed, since militant Shawnees had already decided to do so. However, his death deprived the Shawnees of an important voice of moderation and convinced many Indians that Americans could not be trusted. More Shawnees joined the ranks of the militants after the murder. Cornstalk's followers relocated to Coshocton in 1778. His sister Nonhelema moved to Fort Randolph, where she worked as an interpreter and messenger for the Americans, and continued to promote peace despite her brother's murder.

American political and military leaders were alarmed by Cornstalk's murder; they believed he was their only hope of securing Shawnee neutrality. Patrick Henry, the first governor of Virginia under the United States, was outraged, demanding that Cornstalk's "vile assassins" be brought to justice.

The accused were "James Hall of the county of Rockbridge, and Malcolm McCown of Augusta, Adam Barnes of Greenbrier, William Roane of Rockbridge and Hugh Galbreath of Rockbridge", for whom Henry called rewards for their capture: "for James Hall 200 dollars, for Malcolm McCown 150 dollars, for Adam Barnes, William Roane and Hugh Galbreath 100 dollars each." The alleged killers were eventually brought to trial, but since their fellow soldiers would not testify against them, all were acquitted.

== Legacy ==
Cornstalk was originally buried at Fort Randolph. In 1840, his grave was rediscovered and his remains were moved to the Mason County Courthouse grounds. When the courthouse was torn down in 1954, Cornstalk was reburied at Tu-Endie-Wei State Park, the site of the Battle of Point Pleasant. Local legends arose about his dying "curse" being the cause of misfortunes in the area. Regional stories claim that he took his revenge in the 1960s by sending the mysterious Mothman to terrorize Point Pleasant.

A legend about Aracoma, a supposed daughter of Cornstalk, is well known in Logan County, West Virginia. The story is presented as an outdoor drama each year at Chief Logan State Park. The city of Logan, West Virginia, was known as "Aracoma" from about 1844 to 1907, and was named after her.

== See also ==
- Chief Cornstalk Wildlife Management Area
