= Pickaway Plains =

Pickaway Plains is a wide area of rolling hills beginning about 3 miles south of Circleville, Ohio, and extending several miles to the north and south. This geological area was formed by sand and gravel deposited by melting water from the last glacier to retreat from the region during the Ice Age. During the time of inhabitation by the Shawnee, the Pickaway Plains were covered by prairie vegetation, mainly grasses.

== Villages ==
This area was inhabited most recently by the Shawnee, who founded at least three villages here:

- Cornstalk Town was located on the north bank of the Scippo Creek in Pickaway County, Ohio. It was just east of the present U.S. Highway 23 highway and approximately where Gold Cliff Park is today. The town was named for Cornstalk, a Shawnee chief.
- Grenadier Squaw Village was located opposite the Scippo Creek from Cornstalk Town. The town was named for Cornstalk's sister Nonhelema, whom the British called the "Grenadier Squaw" because of her imposing stature.
- Kispoko Town "was situated on the east bank of the [Scioto] river, across from the Pickaway Plains about midway between present day Circleville and Chillicothe. This town was peopled by the Chalahgawatha sect of the Shawnee tribe, one of five clans making up the Shawnee Nation. The principal Chiefs of this area were the legendary Chief Cornstalk (Hokolewqua) and his giant sister, Grenadier Squaw (non-hel-e-ma) who stood at six and a half feet tall." Tecumseh's birth "occurred while his parents, Shawnee war chief, Pucksinwah, and his wife, Methotasa, were en route from their village of Kispoko Town, on the Scioto River, to a major tribal council at the Shawnee tribal capital village of Chalahgawth (Chillicothe - now Oldtown), which was located "two arrow flights" northwest."
- Lower Shawneetown, also known as Shannoah, was relocated in 1758 from its original site at the confluence of the Ohio River and the Scioto, after Virginia militia launched an expedition to destroy it February, 1756 (the failed Sandy Creek Expedition). Some refugees from Logstown and from Upper Shawneetown were also invited to live there. The Shawnee referred to Pickaway Plains as Moguck.
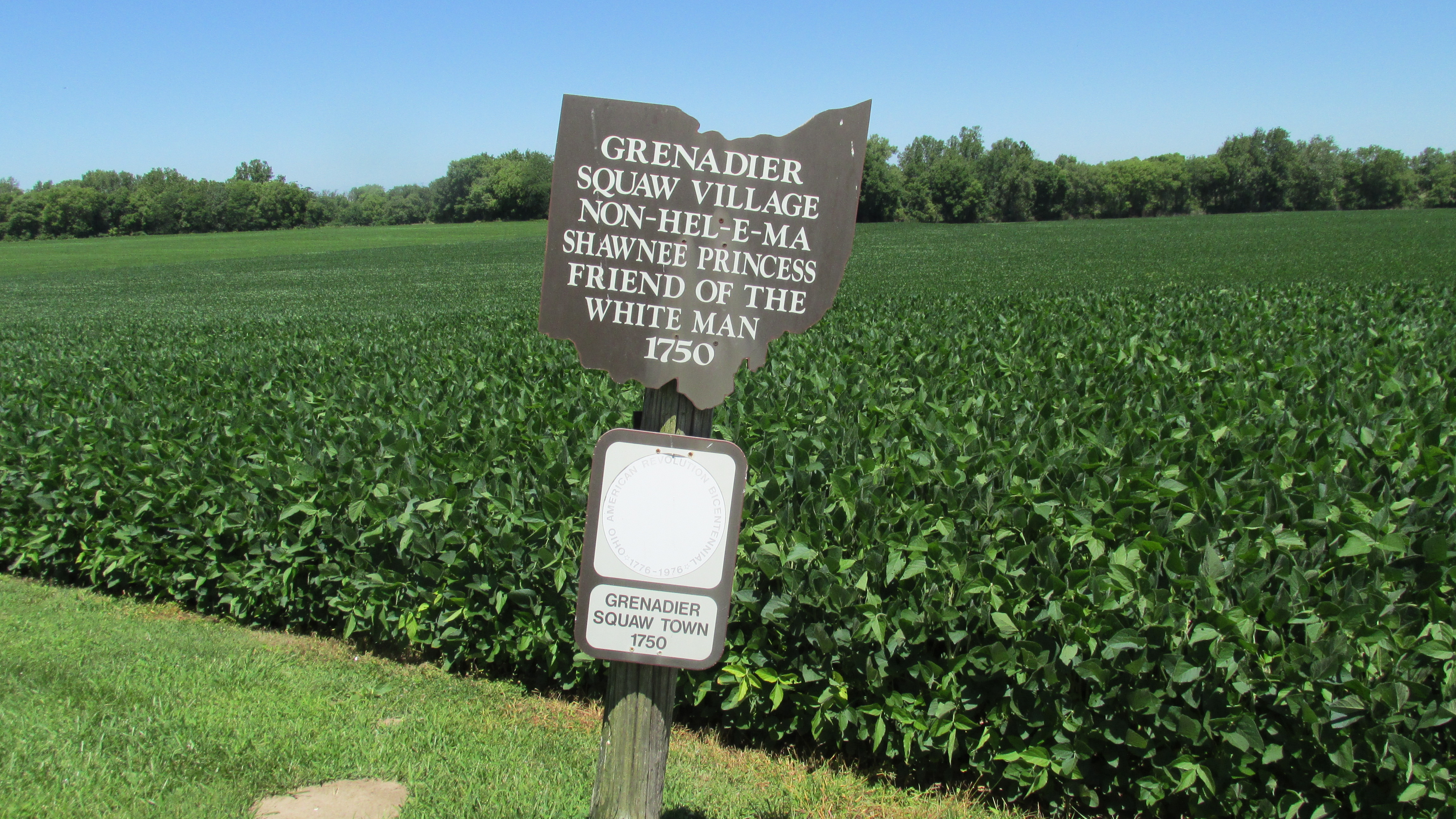
Non-Hel-E-Ma sign located on Emerson Road.

== Dunmore's War ==
In 1774, the Shawnee and allied nations sent around 300-500 men from the Pickaway Plains area to meet Lord Dunmore's army of Virginia militia. Lord Dunmore was attempting both to subdue the Shawnee and Mingo, and to prevent Pennsylvania from laying claim upon present-day Ohio. This conflict became known as Dunmore's War. At Point Pleasant, West Virginia, Cornstalk and his army met a detachment of Dunmore's army under command of Colonel Andrew Lewis.

The forces met on October 10, 1774, at what became known as the Battle of Point Pleasant. After several hours of intense fighting, Lewis's detachment drove Cornstalk and his men northward, across the Ohio River. Dunmore then led his army in pursuit of the Shawnee.

Cornstalk and his men retreated to Pickaway Plains, with Dunmore's army still in pursuit. As they reached the villages, Dunmore requested that Cornstalk discuss a peace treaty. Cornstalk agreed after he received word that Lewis's detachment had destroyed several villages along the Ohio River. At the treaty, held at Camp Charlotte, Cornstalk agreed to honor the Treaty of Fort Stanwix of 1768, ceding the Shawnee hunting lands of present-day Kentucky to Virginia.
