= Thomas Alford =

Thomas Alford may refer to:

- Thomas Alford (Queensland pioneer) (1817–1864), pioneer in the Drayton/Toowoomba area, Australia
- Thomas Alford (Taabinga Station), Australian proprietor of the Taabinga Station; son of Thomas Alford (Queensland pioneer)
- Thomas Wildcat Alford (1860–1938), Native American writer
- Dale Alford (born Thomas Dale Alford; 1916–2000), American ophthalmologist and politician
