= Blackfish (Shawnee leader) =

Shawnee leader (1729–1779)

Blackfish (c. 1729–1779) (Shawnee: Cot-ta-wa-ma-go or Mkah-day-way-may-qua) was a Native American leader, war chief of the Chillicothe band of the Shawnee tribe.

== Biography ==
Little is known about him, since he only appears in written historical records during the last three years of his life, primarily because of his interactions with the famous American frontiersmen Daniel Boone and Simon Kenton.

When the Shawnee were defeated by Virginia in Dunmore's War in 1774, the resulting peace treaty made the Ohio River the boundary between western Virginia (what is now Kentucky and West Virginia) and American Indian lands in the Ohio Country. Although this treaty was agreed to by Shawnee leaders such as Cornstalk, Blackfish and a number of other leaders refused to acknowledge the loss of their traditional hunting grounds in Kentucky.

Violence along the border escalated with the outbreak of the American Revolutionary War in 1775. As a result, the Chillicothe Shawnee moved their town on the Scioto River further west to the Little Miami River, near what is now Xenia, Ohio. Encouraged and supplied by British officials in Detroit, Blackfish and others launched raids against American settlers in Kentucky, hoping to drive them out of the region. In revenge for the murder of Cornstalk by American militiamen in November 1777, Blackfish set out on an unexpected winter raid in Kentucky, capturing American frontiersman Daniel Boone and a number of others on the Licking River on February 7, 1778. Boone, respected by the Shawnee for his extraordinary hunting skills, was taken back to Chillicothe and adopted into the tribe. The traditional tale is that Boone was adopted by Blackfish himself, although historian John Sugden suggests that Boone was probably adopted by another family.

Boone escaped in June 1778 when he learned that Blackfish was launching a siege of the Kentucky settlement of Boonesborough, which commenced in September of that year. The siege of Boonesborough was unsuccessful, and the Kentuckians, led by Colonel John Bowman, counterattacked Chillicothe the following spring. This raid was also unsuccessful, but Blackfish was shot in the leg, a wound which became infected and was eventually fatal.

== Legacy ==
Character actors Anthony Caruso, Walter Coy and Robert F. Simon played Blackfish in segments of NBC's Daniel Boone television series, starring Fess Parker.
