= Kispoko =

Shawnee division that traditionally provided war chiefs

Kispokotha

Regions with significant populations

Languages
- Shawnee

Related ethnic groups
- Shawnee, Chalahgawtha, Mekoche, Pekowi, Hathawekela

Kispoko (also spelled Kiscopocoke, Kispokotha, Spitotha) is the name of one of the five divisions (or septs) of the Shawnee, a Native American people. The Kispoko were the smallest of the five septs or divisions during the 18th century. They lived among the Creek in the Upper South and Southeast as early as 1650, having been driven from their Ohio country homeland by the Iroquois Confederacy during the Beaver Wars. They returned to Ohio about 1759. The other four divisions were the Chalahgawtha, Mekoche, Pekowi, and Hathawekela. (Each of the five division names have been spelled in a great variety of ways.) Together these divisions formed the loose confederacy that was the Shawnee tribe. The septs tended to serve different functions for the overall confederacy.

Traditionally, the Shawnee had a patrilineal system, by which descent and inheritance went through paternal lines. The war chiefs were hereditary and descended from their paternal line in the Kispoko division.

Historians have held that most of this sept relocated west of the Mississippi River in the early 19th century during the period of Indian Removal. Some remained in the Midwest. Since the late 20th century, their descendants have organized as two groups that identify as Kispoko of the Shawnee; they are documented in Ohio and Indiana. Neither has been recognized by respective states or the federal government. (Neither Ohio nor Indiana have a process for state recognition of Native American tribes.)

== Kispoko in Ohio ==
The Shawnee village of Peckuwe, which was located at 39°54.5′N 83°54.68′W (near what is modern Springfield, Ohio) was home to the Peckuwe and Kispoko divisions of the Shawnee Tribe in the late eighteenth century. During the Battle of Piqua (August 8, 1780), in the midst of the American Revolutionary War, they were defeated by European-American settlers. The village was destroyed.

The Piqua Sept of Ohio Shawnee Tribe have placed a traditional cedar pole in commemoration, located "on the southern edge of the George Rogers Clark Historical Park, in the lowlands in front of the park's 'Hertzler House.'"

Another Shawnee settlement in Ohio was called "Kispoko Town."

"Kispoko Town" was situated on the east bank of the Scioto River, across from the Pickaway Plains about midway between present day Circleville and Chillicothe. This town was peopled by the Chalahgawatha sept of the Shawnee tribe, one of five divisions making up the Shawnee Nation. The principal Chiefs of this area were the legendary Chief Cornstalk (Hokolewqua) and his tall sister, Grenadier Squaw (Non-hel-e-ma), who stood at six and a half feet tall.

— Mark Howes, "Stage's Pond Local Lore"

== 21st-century Kispoko Shawnee ==
A Kispoko Sept of Ohio Shawnee (Hog Creek Reservation) was listed as residing in Cridersville, Ohio as of 2013, according to the 500 Nations website. But, an 1880 source states that the Shawnee, including those formerly living in the Hog Creek Reservation (present-day Shawnee Township), were removed to eastern Kansas in 1832, receiving payment of $30,000 in fifteen annual installments for their lands, which had an estimated value of over $200,000 at that time. An 1832 census lists the names of individuals from the Hog Creek Band who moved to Kansas.

The Upper Kispoko Band of the Shawnee Nation, an unrecognized tribe, was listed as being located in Kokomo, Indiana as of 2013.
