= Thomas Wildcat Alford =

- Gay-nwaw-piah-si-ka
- Born: July 15, 1860 near Sasakwa, Indian Territory
- Died: August 3, 1938 (aged 78); Pottawatomie County, Oklahoma
- Occupations: Writer, translator, teacher
- Employer: Office of Indian Affairs

Thomas Wildcat Alford (July 15, 1860 – August 3, 1938) was an Absentee Shawnee who became one of the first Native Americans to become enrolled in the American school system intended to conform indigenous peoples to the customs of Christian Anglo-Americans. He attended Hampton Institute and converted to Christianity, subsequently relinquishing his expectations to become chief upon returning to his tribe. Rejected by the Shawnees because of his conversion, Alford became a teacher at an Indian boarding school and played a significant role in advocating for Indian allotment and assimilation.

== Early life ==
Thomas Wildcat Alford was born on July 15, 1860, near Sasakwa, Oklahoma, on the bank of the Canadian River. He was the great-grandson of the Shawnee Chief Tecumseh and born into the Absentee Shawnee Tribe. He belonged to the Tha-we-gi-la clan, one of the two principle clans of the Shawnee. In keeping with Shawnee customs, he was given the name Gay-nwaw-piah-si-ka ten days after his birth.

Alford was born into a turbulent era of American history, spending his earliest years of childhood during the time of the American Civil War. As a result, he and his family spent the first eight years of his life as nomads. When Alford and his family were temporarily taking refuge in Kansas, his father, Gay-tah-ki-piah-si-kah, served in the Confederate Union Cavalry. In 1868, Alford and his family finally chose a permanent settlement in the Indian Territory in Oklahoma. Gay-tah-ki-piah-si-kah became afflicted with a disease during the Civil War that would continue to ail him on occasion, and Alford would consequently accompany his father during hunting trips and tribal councils, developing an esteemed reputation among the Shawnee elders.

In 1872, the Society of Friends of Philadelphia established a missionary school in Shawnee territory which Alford would attend for two years, learning how to read and write, keep good hygiene, and behave courteously and politely. It was during his enrollment at the missionary school that he was given his first English name, Thomas, by an acquaintance of his father's. In 1874, the missionaries turned the school over to government control and it became the Shawnee Boarding School, which Alford would attend for another two years, extending his studies to include geography, grammar, and arithmetic.

== Education ==
In October 1889, Alford was selected to be enrolled at Hampton Institute in Virginia to learn the traditions and customs of Christian Anglo-Americans in a tribal response to the changing political landscape between white Americans and the native tribes. The Shawnee chiefs who sent Alford to Hampton told him his mission was learn the ability to fluently read books, speak English, and understand Anglo-American customs so that he would be able to guide Shawnee responses to federal government actions. If he was successful, and maintained his belief in the Shawnee faith, Alford was told that he would become the successor to the chief of his clan.

Alford enrolled at Hampton under the name Thomas Wildcat; Wildcat being his father's nickname. At Hampton he was legally bestowed the name Alford, and added it to the end of the name under which he had enrolled. Hampton Institute at the time was a co-educational school with strict militaristic rules and regulations. Hampton was not a religious institute in name, but enforced attendance at some manner of church on Sundays and conducted a daily service in the assembly hall.

Alford converted to Christianity at Hampton and relinquished his claim to eventually become a Shawnee chief. He studied at Hampton Institute for three years and upon his graduation, returned to his tribe to an unwelcoming rejection of his conversion to Christianity.

== Career ==
On November 1, 1882, Alford entered into the U.S. Indian Service, known at the time as the Office of Indian Affairs, first serving as a teacher for a Pottawatomie day school. In 1883, he was transferred to the Shawnee Boarding School, serving as the principal there for five years. As principal, Alford encouraged the enrollment of Shawnee children in education and expanded the existing campus grounds of the Shawnee Boarding School.

Following his teaching career, Alford worked as an advocate for Indian Allotment, collecting a complete list of Shawnee tribe members for the allotment census. Alford also acquired the position of surveyor on multiple occasions during the Indian Allotment era, assisting Shawnees, Kickapoos, and Anglo-Americans in assessing the land for their respective claims. Alford was sporadically appointed to be a translator in legal cases involving Shawnee tribe members. After the abolition of Indian tribal government, Alford was appointed as chairman of the Business Committee in September 1893. The Business Committee was established by the Commissioner of Indian Affairs to represent the Absentee Shawnees in all legal and federal matters.

Alford translated the Gospel into the Shawnee language, published as The Four Gospels of our Lord Jesus Christ by Dr. William A. Galloway in 1929. In 1936, he described the course of events that transpired throughout his life and career to Florence Drake, which was published as Civilization As Told To Florence Drake by the University of Oklahoma Press. His account gives detailed firsthand information of the Shawnee Indian perspective regarding Indian allotment and Indian assimilation.

Alford died of illness on August 3, 1938, at his home in Pottawatomie County, Oklahoma.
