= Pekowi =

One of the five divisions of the Shawnee

Pekowitha

Regions with significant populations
- Historically Pennsylvania, Ohio, Kentucky

Languages
- Shawnee

Religion
- Indigenous religions

Related ethnic groups
- Chalahgawtha, Mekoche, Kispoko, Hathawekela, Shawnee

Pekowi was the name of one of the five divisions (or bands) of the Shawnee, a Native American people, during the 18th century. The other four divisions were the Chalahgawtha, Mekoche, Kispoko, and Hathawekela. Together these divisions formed the loose confederacy that was the Shawnee tribe.

All five Shawnee division names have been spelled in a great variety of ways. Variations of the name "Pekowi" are reflected in many place names in the United States, including Piqua, Pickawillany, Pickaway, and Pequea.

Traditionally, Shawnee ritual leaders came from the Pekowi patrilineal division.

From 1737 to about 1750 the Pekowi were led by Peter Chartier (born Pierre Chartier), a fur trader of Pekowi and French colonial parentage. He was recognized as a leader and rose to be chief of the band. Through his mother's line, Chartier was the grandson of chief Straight Tail Meaurroway Opessa. In 1710 he married his cousin, Blanceneige-Wapakonee Opessa and they had three children: two sons and a daughter.

Chartier opposed the sale of rum in Shawnee communities in Pennsylvania, and this brought him into conflict with other traders and the provincial governor, Patrick Gordon. Shawnee and other Native American chiefs had long complained about the sale of alcohol, and had given the colonial government a list of traders they wanted banned because of their actions.

In 1745 Chartier accepted a French commission and left Pennsylvania, leading some 400 members of the Pekowi to Lower Shawneetown. They moved on to modern Kentucky, where they founded the community of Eskippakithiki. Pekowi warriors led by Chartier fought on the side of the French against the English at the Battle of Fort Necessity in 1754 during the French and Indian War.

The Peckuwe and Kispoko divisions of the Shawnee Tribe lived in the Shawnee village of Peckuwe, which was located at 39°54.5′N 83°54.68′W near modern Springfield, Ohio, until the Battle of Piqua, August 8, 1780, during the American Revolutionary War.

The Piqua Sept of the Ohio Shawnee Tribe have placed a traditional cedar pole in commemoration of their history here. It is located "on the southern edge of the George Rogers Clark Historical Park, in the lowlands in front of the park's 'Hertzler House.'"
