= Sagaiguninini =

The Sagaiguninini (‘people of the lake’) were allegedly a sub-nation of the Algonquin group. In 1630-1640, the group lived south-west of the Ottawa river and may have been unrelated to the rest, "as nearly all the other bands are on or northeast of the Ottawa River". They lived east of Georgian Bay and what is now known to locals as "The Big Three" lakes in Ontario (Lake Rosseau, Lake Muskoka, Lake Joseph). Very little is known about this group today, however the Algonquin word "sagaigun" means lake and their name is still part of the local culture and language. The town of Seguin, Ontario and the steam ship RMS Segwun are good example of names that have carried into the modern age.
