= Red Pole (Shawnee) =

- Muscquaconocah

Shawnee leader

Personal details
- Relations: Blue Jacket

Red Pole (Muscquaconocah) was an 18th-century Shawnee leader.

He is believed to be a brother of Blue Jacket. He led a delegation to negotiations for the 1795 Treaty of Greenville, which ended the Northwest Indian War, and was a signatory. His name was transcribed as Misquacoonacaw on the treaty.

Red Pole accompanied Blue Jacket to Philadelphia in November 1798, and met with President George Washington. His likeness, along with Blue Jacket, was represented as a wax figure by Charles Willson Peale at his Philadelphia Museum.

The United States erected a headstone for Red Pole in downtown Pittsburgh, Pennsylvania.
