= Chalahgawtha =

Division of the Shawnee people

Chalahgawtha

Regions with significant populations
- Ohio Country, Great Lakes region

Languages
- Shawnee

Related ethnic groups
- Mekoche, Kispoko, Pekowi, Hathawekela

Chalahgawtha (or, more commonly in English, Chillicothe /ˌtʃɪlɪˈkɒθi/ CHIL-ih-KOTH-ee) is the name of one of the five divisions (or bands) of the Shawnee, a Native American people. It is also the name of the principal village of the division. The other four divisions are the Mekoche, Kispoko, Pekowi, and Hathawekela. (All five division names have been spelled in a great variety of ways.) Together these divisions form the loose confederacy that constitutes the Shawnee tribe.

By tradition, each Shawnee division has certain roles it performs on behalf of the entire tribe. These customs were already fading by the time they were recorded in writing by European Americans in the 18th century. The Chalahgawtha division traditionally provides political leadership for the tribe. A well-known Chalahgawtha leader was Chief Blackfish.

The village where the chief of the Chalahgawtha division lived was also known as "Chillicothe". When this principal village was relocated, often as a result of war or the expansion of European-American settlement, the new village would again be known as "Chillicothe". Not all the Shawnee living in the town belonged to the Chalahgawtha division. They also tolerated residents from tribes other than the Shawnee. As a result of naming their communities in this way, there are numerous Shawnee Chillicothe villages in the historical record. This has occasionally caused some confusion to researchers.

== Historical villages ==
=== Lower Shawnee Town (c. 1734–1758) ===
Lower Shawnee Town, as it was called by European-American colonists, was a large town on the Ohio River, founded about 1734 by Shawnee. The Shawnee name of the town was not recorded, but scholars believe it may have been "Chillicothe". The town grew to be a major trading hub in the years leading up to the French and Indian War. But it was of lesser political importance than Logstown, which was upriver on the Ohio. Members from most, if not all five Shawnee divisions, lived in the town, as well as an assortment of other Native Americans, Europeans, and African Americans. It had an estimated total population of 1,200 or more people. Lower Shawnee Town was abandoned in 1758, after the population relocated north into central Ohio to avoid attack by the Virginia militia.

=== Scioto River village (1758–1787) ===
The next Chillicothe (1758–1787) was one of seven Shawnee villages developed on the west bank of the Scioto River, near Paint Creek and what developed as modern Chillicothe, Ohio. The village was settled in the late 1750s by survivors of the floods at Lower Shawnee Town and the burning of Logstown, at a time when Shawnee were returning to the Ohio Country after having been driven out and scattered by the Iroquois decades earlier in competition over the fur trade. Cheeseekau, older brother of Tecumseh, was probably born here about 1761. Tecumseh may have been born here in 1768, or at nearby Kisposko town. In 1762, Chillicothe contained about 300 warriors (representing a total of perhaps 1,200 people). The majority of Shawnee then living in Ohio lived there.

European influences, especially in trade goods such as guns, kettles, and clothing, were prevalent among the Shawnee at this time. David Jones, an Anglican missionary, visited the town in 1773 and noted that a British fur trader named Moses Henry lived there.

In the early 1770s, the Shawnee towns on the Scioto were the focus of a Shawnee-led movement formed to resist colonial expansion onto their traditional hunting grounds following the 1768 Treaty of Fort Stanwix. The Shawnee were ultimately unsuccessful in forging a large alliance, however. They fought Dunmore's War in 1774 with little support from other tribes. An army from Virginia marched to the Scioto villages and forced the Shawnee to accept the boundary established in the Stanwix treaty.

After the outbreak of the American Revolutionary War, many Chillicothe residents relocated northwest to form a village on the Little Miami River. Shawnee villagers continued to live on the Scioto, along with some Cherokee, until the village was attacked by Americans in 1787 during the Northwest Indian War, after the establishment of the United States.

=== Old Chillicothe (1774–1780) ===
Because of its prominence in the American Revolutionary War, Old Chillicothe (1774–1780) was the most famous of the Shawnee Chillicothe villages in American history. It is often referred to in historical writing as "Old Chillicothe", in order to distinguish it from the modern Ohio city of Chillicothe. Settlement of the village began in 1774. Located on the Little Miami River, the area is now known as Oldtown, near present-day Xenia, Ohio.

Chillicothe was the home of Blackfish, war chief of the division. From here the Shawnee staged numerous raids into Kentucky, where they hoped to drive out the American settlers. Frontiersman Daniel Boone was captured in Kentucky in 1778 by Chief Blackfish and brought to Chillicothe with other prisoners. Boone was adopted into the tribe and lived for several months at Chillicothe. According to tradition the village was the birthplace of Tecumseh, who became a famous Shawnee leader responsible for creating a large alliance among tribes in the late eighteenth century. But Tecumseh was born in 1768, before this Chillicothe was settled. As mentioned above, he was likely born at a village on the Scioto River.

There were raids across the Ohio on both sides during the American Revolutionary War. After Chief Blackfish unsuccessfully besieged Boonesborough, Kentucky in 1778, Americans crossed the Ohio River and attacked Chillicothe on May 29, 1779. Blackfish successfully defended the town, but was shot in the leg and later died when the wound became infected. In 1780, in retaliation for Bird's invasion of Kentucky, George Rogers Clark led the Kentucky militia up the Little Miami River. The Shawnee and other residents abandoned Chillicothe as Clark approached. Clark burned the town and destroyed the surrounding crops. (By some accounts, the Shawnee had burned the town before fleeing, to deny the Kentucky militia plunder and supplies.) Clark marched further north and fought a battle at Pekowi town, where he defeated the Shawnee.

=== Great Miami River village (1780–1782) ===
Chillicothe was resettled on the Great Miami River (1780–1782) after the destruction of the previous village. Although a British army surrendered at Yorktown in October 1781, the war on the frontier continued unabated. In Kentucky, the Americans were defeated at the Battle of Blue Licks in August 1782, the worst defeat of the war for the soldiers of Kentucky. In retaliation, in November Clark led another expedition into Ohio, the last major campaign of the war. His forces destroyed Chillicothe and four other villages.

=== Later villages ===
The next Chillicothe was on the St. Mary's River (1783–1790). Another Chillicothe (1788–1792) was located on the Maumee River, near present Fort Wayne, Indiana. A Chillicothe (1787–?) was located on the west bank of the Mississippi River, north of present Cape Girardeau, Missouri.

== See also ==
- Shawnee
- Tecumseh
- Chief Blackfish

== Bibliography ==
- Bakeless, John (1957). Background to Glory: The Life of George Rogers Clark. Lincoln: University of Nebraska Press. ISBN 0-8032-6105-5.
- Calloway, Colin G. (2007). The Shawnees and the War for America. New York: Viking Press. ISBN 978-0-670-02054-6.
- Edmunds, R. David (2001). "Forgotten Allies: The Loyal Shawnees and the War of 1812". In Skaggs, David Curtis; Nelson, Larry L. (eds.). The Sixty Years' War for the Great Lakes, 1754–1814. East Lansing: Michigan State University Press. pp. 337–351. ISBN 0-87013-569-4.
- "E.W. Scripps School of Journalism Ohio Pronunciation Guide". 2016. Archived from the original on July 30, 2026.
- Hanna, Charles Augustus (1911). The Wilderness Trail: Or, The Ventures and Adventures of the Pennsylvania Traders on the Allegheny Path. Vol. 1. Putnam's sons.
- Henderson, A. Gwynn (1999). "The Lower Shawnee Town on Ohio: Sustaining Native Autonomy in an Indian 'Republic'". In Friend, Craig Thompson (ed.). The Buzzel About Kentuck: Settling the Promised Land. Lexington: University Press of Kentucky. ISBN 0-8131-2085-3.
- Kleber, John E. (1992). The Kentucky Encyclopedia. Lexington: University Press of Kentucky. ISBN 978-0-8131-2883-2.
- Lakomäki, Sami (2014). Gathering Together: The Shawnee People through Diaspora and Nationhood, 1600–1870. New Haven: Yale University Press. ISBN 978-0-300-19418-2.
- Sugden, John (1997). Tecumseh: A Life. New York: Holt. ISBN 0-8050-4138-9.
- Sugden, John (1999). "Blackfish". American National Biography. Oxford: Oxford University Press.
- Tanner, Helen Hornbeck, ed. (1987). Atlas of Great Lakes Indian History. Norman: University of Oklahoma Press.
