= Hathawekela =

One of the five divisions of the Shawnee people

θawikila

Regions with significant populations
- Historically South Carolina, Pennsylvania, Ohio, West Virginia; today Oklahoma

Languages
- Shawnee, English

Related ethnic groups
- Chalahgawtha, Kispoko, Mekoche, Pekowi, Shawnee

Hathawekela (also spelled Oawikila, Thaawikila, Thawegila; Shawnee: θawikila; French: Chalaqua) is one of the five divisions of the Shawnee, a Native American people. The other four divisions are the Chalahgawtha, Kispoko, Mekoche, and Pekowi. All five division names appear in varied spellings in historical records. Together, these divisions form the loose confederacy that is the Shawnee tribe.

Traditionally, Shawnee political leadership came from the Hathawekela patrilineal division. The Hathawekela claim to be the "elder brothers" among the Shawnee, as being the first created of the tribe.

== History ==
=== Colonial era ===
Tradition and the known linguistic connections of the Shawnee indicate that they had migrated to the Cumberland River Valley from the north not long before the historic period. Shortly after 1674, the Hathawekela, or the part of the Shawnee afterward so called, settled upon the Savannah River. In 1681, they proved of great assistance to the new colony of South Carolina by driving a tribe known as the Westo, probably part of the Yuchi, from the middle Savannah.

About 1697, they emigrated from the South together with other Shawnee bands and settled partly on the Susquehanna River and partly on the Allegheny River in Pennsylvania, where they are mentioned in 1731. The town of Sewickley, Pennsylvania, likely takes its name from them.

=== Removal and relocation ===
During the 19th century, the Shawnee, including the Hathawekela division, were removed from their traditional homelands to Indian Territory (present-day Oklahoma). The band formerly under Black Bob was a portion of the Hathawekela division.

== Modern status ==
Today, the Shawnee are represented by three federally recognized tribes: the Absentee-Shawnee Tribe of Indians of Oklahoma, the Eastern Shawnee Tribe of Oklahoma, and the Shawnee Tribe.

== See also ==
- Shawnee
- Shawnee traditional narratives
