= Mekoche =

One of the five divisions of the Shawnee people

Mekoche
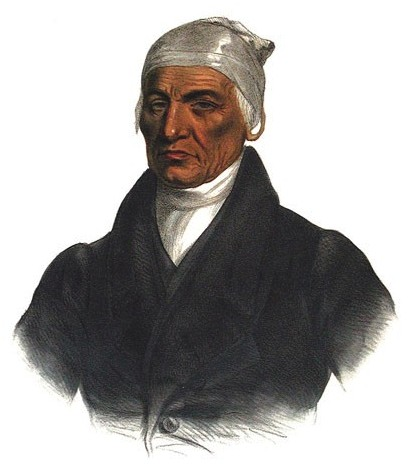
- Catecahassa, Mekoche head civil chief

Regions with significant populations
- Historically Ohio; today Oklahoma

Languages
- Shawnee, English

Related ethnic groups
- Chalahgawtha, Hathawekela, Kispoko, Pekowi, Shawnee

Mekoche (also spelled Mequachake; Shawnee: mecoce) is one of the five divisions of the Shawnee, a Native American people. The other four divisions are the Chalahgawtha, Hathawekela, Kispoko, and Pekowi. All five division names appear in varied spellings in historical records. Together, these divisions form the loose confederacy that is the Shawnee tribe.

Traditionally, Shawnee healers came from the Mekoche patrilineal division.

== History ==
=== Ohio settlements ===
Pigeon Town, occupied by the Mekoche division, was located on the Mad River, 3 miles (4.8 km) northwest of West Liberty, Logan County, Ohio. Macochee Creek is named for this division; it is a small stream that meets the Mad River at West Liberty, having arisen near modern Pickrelltown, Ohio.

== Modern status ==
Today, the Shawnee are represented by three federally recognized tribes: the Absentee-Shawnee Tribe of Indians of Oklahoma, the Eastern Shawnee Tribe of Oklahoma, and the Shawnee Tribe.

== Notable Mekoche ==
- Black Hoof

== See also ==
- Shawnee
- Shawnee traditional narratives
