= Blue Jacket =

17/18th-century Shawnee chief

- Weyapiersenwah

Shawnee leader
- Succeeded by: Tecumseh

Personal details
- Born: c. 1738 (present day Ross County, Ohio).
- Died: c. 1810
- Relations: Red Pole, Charles Blue Jacket
- Known for: Defense of Shawnee lands in the Ohio Country

Military service
- Battles/wars: Lord Dunmore's War; American Revolutionary War; Northwest Indian War; Harmar campaign; St. Clair's defeat; Battle of Fallen Timbers

Blue Jacket, or Weyapiersenwah (c. 1743 – 1810), was a war chief of the Shawnee people, known for his militant defense of Shawnee lands in the Ohio Country. Perhaps the preeminent American Indian leader in the Northwest Indian War, in which a pantribal confederacy fought several battles with the nascent United States, he was an important predecessor of the famous Shawnee leader Tecumseh.

== Early life ==
Little is known of Blue Jacket's early life. He first appears in written historical records in 1773, when he was already a grown man and a war chief. In that year, a British missionary visited the Shawnee villages on the Scioto River and recorded the location of Blue Jacket's Town on Deer Creek (present-day Ross County, Ohio).

== Struggle for the Old Northwest ==
Blue Jacket participated in Lord Dunmore's War and the American Revolutionary War (allied with the British), always attempting to maintain Shawnee land rights. With the British defeat in the American Revolutionary War, the Shawnee lost valuable assistance in defending the Ohio Country. The struggle continued as white settlement in Ohio escalated, and Blue Jacket was a prominent leader of the resistance. He was present during the 1790 Harmar campaign and may have been one of the leaders who organized the defense.

On November 3, 1791, the army of a confederation of Indian tribes, led by Blue Jacket and Miami Chief Little Turtle, defeated an American expedition led by Arthur St. Clair, governor of the Northwest Territory. The engagement, known as the Battle of the Wabash or St. Clair's defeat, was the crowning achievement of Blue Jacket's military career and the most severe defeat ever inflicted upon the United States by Native Americans. Traditional accounts of the battle tend to give most of the credit for the victory to Little Turtle. John Sugden argues that Little Turtle's prominence is primarily because of Little Turtle's self-promotion in later years.

Blue Jacket's triumph was short-lived. The Americans were alarmed by St. Clair's disaster and raised a new professional army, commanded by General Anthony Wayne. On August 20, 1794, Blue Jacket's confederate army clashed with Wayne at the Battle of Fallen Timbers, just south of present-day Toledo, Ohio. Blue Jacket's army was defeated, and he was compelled to sign the Treaty of Greenville on August 3, 1795, ceding much of present-day Ohio to the United States. Blue Jacket's son-in-law, Jacques Lasselle Jr., served as interpreter and signed the Treaty of Greenville in that capacity.

In 1805, Blue Jacket also signed the Treaty of Fort Industry, relinquishing even more of Ohio. In Blue Jacket's final years, he saw the rise to prominence of Tecumseh, who would take up the banner and make the final attempts to reclaim Shawnee lands in the Ohio Country.

== Van Swearingen legend ==
In 1877, decades after Blue Jacket's death, a story was published which claimed that Blue Jacket had actually been a white man named Marmaduke Van Swearingen who had been captured and adopted by Shawnees in the 1770s, around the time of the American Revolutionary War. This story was popularized in historical novels written by Allan W. Eckert in the late 1960s. An outdoor drama based on the Van Swearingen story, Blue Jacket, White Shawnee War Chief, was performed in Xenia, Ohio, beginning in 1981. Performances of the play ended in 2007.

Beginning with historian Helen Hornbeck Tanner in 1978, a number of historians have argued that Blue Jacket and Van Swearingen were not likely to be the same person. The historical record indicates that Blue Jacket was much older than Marmaduke Van Swearingen and was already an established chief by the time Van Swearingen was supposedly captured. Furthermore, no one who personally knew Blue Jacket left any records referring to him as a white man. According to Blue Jacket biographer John Sugden, Blue Jacket was undoubtedly a Shawnee by birth.

DNA testing of the descendants of Blue Jacket and Van Swearingen has given additional support to the argument that Blue Jacket was not Van Swearingen. After an initial test in 2000, results of a DNA test using updated equipment and techniques was published in the September 2006 edition of The Ohio Journal of Science. The researchers tested DNA samples from four men descended from Charles Swearingen, Marmaduke's brother, and six who are descended from Blue Jacket's son George Blue-Jacket. The DNA from the two families did not match, and so the study concluded that, "Barring any questions of the paternity of the Chief's single son who lived to produce male heirs, the 'Blue Jacket with-Caucasian-roots' is not based on reality."
