= Shawnee language =

Central Algonquian language

Shawnee
- saawanwaatoweewe, sâwanwâtowêwe
- Native to: United States
- Region: Central and Northeast Oklahoma
- Ethnicity: Shawnee
- Native speakers: 70 (2026)
- Language family: Algic: Algonquian; Shawnee
- Writing system: Latin script

Language codes
- ISO 639-3: sjw
- Glottolog: shaw1249
- ELP: Shawnee
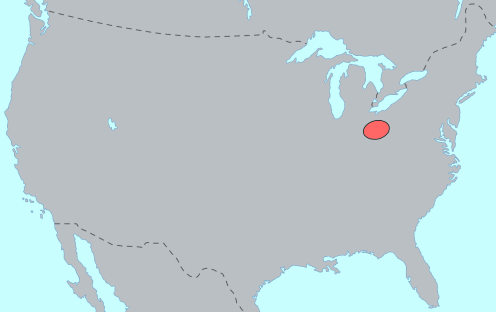
- Distribution of the Shawnee language around 1650

- Shawnee is classified as Severely Endangered by the UNESCO Atlas of the World's Languages in Danger.

Shawnee (/ʃɔːˈni/ shaw-NEE) is a Central Algonquian language spoken in parts of central and northeastern Oklahoma by the Shawnee people. Historically, it was spoken across a wide region of the Eastern United States, primarily north of the Ohio River. This territory included areas within present-day Ohio, West Virginia, Kentucky, and Pennsylvania.

Shawnee is closely related to other Algonquian languages, such as Mesquakie-Sauk (Sac and Fox) and Kickapoo. It has 260 speakers, according to a 2015 census, although the number is decreasing. It is a polysynthetic language that is described as having freedom in word ordering.

== Status ==
Shawnee is severely threatened, as many speakers have shifted to English. The approximately 200 remaining speakers are older adults. Some of the decline in usage of Shawnee resulted from the United States assimilation program carried out by Indian boarding schools, which abused, starved, and beat children who spoke their Native languages. This treatment is often extended to the families of those children as well.

Of the 4,576 citizens of the Absentee Shawnee Tribe around the city of Shawnee, Oklahoma, more than 100 are speakers. Of the 3,652 citizens of the Eastern Shawnee Tribe in Ottawa County, only a few elders are speakers. Of the 2,226 citizens of the Shawnee Tribe, or Loyal Shawnee in northeastern Oklahoma around White Oak, there are fewer than 12 speakers. Because of the low speaker population and the percentage of elderly speakers, Shawnee is classified as an endangered language. Additionally, language development outside of the home has been limited. A dictionary and portions of the Bible translated from 1842 to 1929 were translated into Shawnee.

=== Language revitalization ===
Absentee-Shawnee Elder George Blanchard Sr., former governor of his tribe, teaches classes to Head Start and elementary school children, as well as evening classes for adults, at the Cultural Preservation Center in Seneca, Missouri. His work was profiled on the PBS show American Experience in 2009. The classes are intended to encourage speaking Shawnee among families at home. The Eastern Shawnee have also taught language classes. The Shawnee Tribe launched a language immersion program in 2020 with virtual and in-person classes.

Conversational Shawnee booklets, CDs, and a Learn Shawnee Language website are available.

== Phonology ==
=== Vowels ===
Shawnee has 6 vowel phonemes:

	Front		Back	
	short	long	short	long
Close	i	iː	o	
Open	e		a	aː

- /i/ tends to be realized as near-close [ɪ], as in Blackfoot.
- /e/ tends to be realized as open-mid [ɛ], as in Kickapoo.

In (1) and (2), a near minimal pair has been found for Shawnee /i/ 'i' and /iː/ 'ii'. In (3) and (4), a minimal pair has been found for Shawnee /a/ 'a' and /aː/ 'aa'.

(1) ho-wiisi'-ta 'he was in charge'

(2) wi 'si 'dog'

(3) caaki yaama 'all this'

(4) caki 'small'

However, no quantitative contrasts have been found in the vowels /e/ and /o/.

=== Consonants ===
Shawnee has 13 consonant phonemes:

		Bilabial	Dental/ Alveolar	Palatal (-alveolar)	Velar	Glottal
Nasal		m	n			
Plosive/ Affricate	short	p	t	tʃ	k	ʔ
Plosive/ Affricate	long				kː	(ʔː)
Fricative	short		θ	ʃ		
Fricative	long			(ʃː)		
Approximant		w	l	j		

- Voegelin (1935) identifies additional geminates /ʃː, ʔː/ without presenting minimal pairs.

/k/ and /kk/ contrast in the verbal affixes -ki (which marks third person singular animate objects) and -kki (which marks third person plural animate objects).

The Shawnee /θ/ is most often derived from Proto-Algonquian *s.

Some speakers of Shawnee pronounce /ʃ/ more like an alveolar [s]. This pronunciation is especially common among Loyal Band Shawnee speakers near Vinita, Oklahoma.

[ʔ] and [h] are allophones of the same phoneme: [ʔ] occurs in syllable-final position, while [h] occurs at the beginning of a syllable.

=== Stress ===
Stress in Shawnee falls on the final syllable (ultima) of a word.

Consonant length

In Shawnee phonology, consonant length is contrastive. Words may not begin with vowels, and between a morpheme ending with a vowel and one starting with a vowel, a [y] is inserted. Shawnee does not allow word-final consonants and long vowels.

/k/ and /kk/ contrast in the following verbal affixes

ye- kkil -a -ki
SUB- hide -DIR −3S.AO
when (I) hide him

ye- kkil -a -kki
SUB- hide -DIR −3P.AO
when (I) hide them

These affixes (-ki, -kki) are object markers in the transitive animate subordinate mode. The subject is understood.

[h] Insertion

∅→[h]/#____V

A word may not begin with a vowel. Instead, an on-glide [h] is added. For example:

There are two variants of the article -oci, meaning 'from'. It can attach to nouns to form prepositional phrases, or it can also be a pre-verb. When it attaches to a noun, it is -ooci, and when attached to a pre-verb it is -hoci.

naamin-ooci
Norman-from
from Norman

oklahooma niila hoci-lenawe
Oklahoma 1 from-live
I'm from Oklahoma

/y/ Insertion

∅→[y]/V(:)_____ V(:)

When one of the vowels is long, Shawnee allows for the insertion of [y].

ni-[t]aay-a
I-REDUP-go
'I went (repeatedly)'

Word-final consonant deletion

C# → 0

A consonant is deleted at the end of a word.

In (a), a noun ends in a consonant when a locative suffix follows, but in (b), the consonant is deleted at the word end.

wiikiw55p -ski
house -LOC
'in the house'

wiikiwa ho- staa -ekw -a -li kapenalee -li
house 3- build -INV -DIR -3S.OBV governor -3S.OBV
'The governor (obviative) built (him)

Word-final vowel shortening

V:# → V#

A long vowel is shortened at the end of a word.

== Morphology ==
=== Morpho-phonology ===
==== Rule 1 ====
t/V____V

[t] is inserted between two vowels at the morpheme boundary.

As we know from the phonological rule stated above, a word may not begin with a vowel in Shawnee. From the morphophonological rule above, it can be assumed that [h]~[t].

- example

-eecini(i) meaning 'Indian agent' appears as hina heecini or 'that Indian agent', and as ho-[t]eecinii-ma-waa-li, meaning 'he was their Indian agent'. The [t] of ho-[t]- fills the open slot that would otherwise have to be filled with [h].

==== Rule 2 ====
V1-V2 → V2
A short vowel preceding another short vowel at a morpheme boundary is deleted.

hina + -ene
that + -Xtimes
at that time period, then

melo'kami -eke
spring -LOC
in spring

==== Rule 3 ====
V:V → V:

When a long vowel and a short vowel come together at a morpheme boundary, the short vowel is deleted.

ho- staa -ekw -a -li
3- build -INV -DIR -3S.OBV
he built (him) (a house)

kaa- ki- noot-en -aa -maa -ekw -a
REDUP- PERF- hear-by.hand -TI -TA -INV -DIR
(he) signed by hand (to me) (repeatedly)

Shawnee shares many grammatical features with other Algonquian languages. There are two third persons, proximate and obviative, and two noun classes (or genders), animate and inanimate. It is primarily agglutinating typologically, and is polysynthetic, resulting in a great deal of information being encoded on the verb. The most common word order is Verb-Subject.

=== Affixes ===
stem-(instrumental affix)-transitivizing affix-object affix

The instrumental affix is not obligatory, but if it is present, it determines the type of transitivizing affix that can follow it, (see numbering scheme below) or by the last stem in the theme.

Instrumental affixes are as follows

Instrumental suffix
pw 'by mouth'
n 'by hand'
h(0) 'by heat'
hh 'by mechanical instrument'
l 'by projectile'
(h)t 'by vocal noise'
šk 'by feet in locomotion'
hšk 'by feet as agent'
lhk 'by legs'

=== Possessive paradigm: animate nouns ===
Possessor	Singular noun	Plural noun
1s	ni- + ROOT	ni- + ROOT + ki
2s	ki- + ROOT	ki- + ROOT + ki
3s	ho- + ROOT	ho- + ROOT + ki
4s	ho- + ROOT + li	ho- + ROOT + waa + li
1p (excl)	ni- + ROOT + na	ni- + ROOT + naa + ki
2+1 (incl)	ki- + ROOT + na	ki- + ROOT + naa + ki
2p	ki- + ROOT + wa	ki- + ROOT + waa + ki
4p	ho- + ROOT + hi	ho- + ROOT + waa + hi

=== Possessive paradigm: inanimate nouns ===
-tθani (w)- 'bed'

Possessor	Singular noun	Plural noun
1s	ni- + tθani	ni- + tθaniw+ali
2s	ki- + tθani	ki- + tθaniw+ali
3s	ho- + tθani	ho- + tθaniw+ali
1p (excl)	ni- + tθane+na	ni- + tθane+na
2+1 (incl)	ki- + tθane+na	ki- + tθane+na
2p	ki- + tθani+wa	ki- + tθani+wa
3p	ho- + tθani+wa	ho- + tθani+wa
Locative	tθan + eki	(unattested)
Diminutive	tθan + ehi

== Grammar and syntax ==
=== Word order ===
Shawnee has a fairly free word order, with VSO being the most common:

teki koos -i -ma
NEG run.from -IMPER -AO
'run you from him' (in the negative) 'you mustn't run away from him'

SOV, SVO, VOS, and OVS are also plausible.

=== Grammatical categories ===
Parts of speech in the Algonquian languages, Shawnee included, show a basic division between inflecting forms (nouns, verbs, and pronouns), and non-inflecting invariant forms (also known as particles). Directional particles (piyeci meaning 'towards') incorporate into the verb itself. Although particles are invariant in form, they have different distributions and meanings that correspond to adverbs ([hi]noki meaning 'now', waapaki meaning 'today', lakokwe meaning 'so, certainly', mata meaning 'not') postpositions (heta'koθaki wayeeci meaning 'towards the east') and interjections (ce meaning 'so!').

=== Case ===
Examples (1) and (2) below show the grammatical interaction of obviation and inverse. The narrative begins in (1) in which grandfather is the grammatical subject [+AGENT] in discourse-focus [+PROXIMATE]. In (2), grandfather remains in discourse-focus [+PROXIMATE], but he is now the grammatical object [+OBJECT]. To align grammatical relations properly in (2), the inverse marker /-ekw-/ is used in the verb stem to signal that the governor is affecting the grandfather. (The prefix /ho-/ on ho-stakooli refers to 'grandfather').

he- meci- naat-aw'ky -aa -ci hina ni-me'soom' -θa
SUB- COMPLETED- much-land -TA −3SUB that 1-grandfather -PERSON
'afterwards my grandfather received land'

wiikiwa ho- staa -ekw -a -li kapenalee -li
house 3- build -INV -DIR -3S.OBV governor -3S.OBV
'the governor built (him) a house' (/-li/ is the obviative marker)

Since the person building the house (the governor) is disjointed from the person whom the house is being built for (the grandfather), this disjunction is marked by placing one participant in the obviative. Since the grandfather is the focus of this narrative, the governor is assigned the obviative marking. Grammatically, kapenal-ee (-ee- < -ile- < -ileni- 'person') is the subject who is not in discourse-focus (marked by /-li/ 3s OBVIATIVE), showing that grammatical relations and obviation are independent categories.

Similar interactions of inverse and obviation are found below. In Shawnee, third-person animate beings participate in obviation, including grammatically animate nouns that are semantically inanimate.

we ni- cis -h -ekw -a hina weepikwa
then 1- fear -CAUSE -INV -DIR- that spider
'then that spider scared me'

ho- waap -am -aa -li kisa'θwa -li
3- look -TA -DIR -3S.OBV sun -3S.OBV
'he looked at the sun'

==== Locative affix /-eki/ ====
The Shawnee /-eki/ meaning 'in' can be used with either gender. This locative affix cliticizes onto the preceding noun, and thus it appears to be a case ending.

tekwakhwikan -eki
box -in
'in a box'

msi-wikiwaap -eki
big-house -in
'in a big house'

tθene melo'kami -eki
every spring -in
'every spring'

=== Modality ===
The independent and imperative orders are used in independent clauses. The imperative order involves an understood second person affecting the first or third persons.

teke ki- e'- memekw -i
NEG 2- FUT- run -IMPER
'you mustn't run'

teki- koos -i -ma
NEG run.from -IMPER -AO
'you mustn't run away from him'

teke- wi'θen -i kola'-waapaki
NEG eat -IMPER early-morning
'you mustn't eat early in the morning'

Independent Mode:
Inanimate Intransitive (II):

3s → /-i/ → skwaaw-i 'it is red'
3p → /-a/ → kinwaaw-a 'those are long'

=== Demonstrative pronouns ===
Refer to the examples below. Yaama meaning 'this' in examples 1 and 2 refers to someone in front of the speaker. The repetition of yaama in example 1 emphasizes the location of the referent in the immediate presence of the speaker.

yaama- kookwe- nee -θa -yaama
this- strange- appearing -PERSON -this
'this stranger (the one right in front of me)'

mata- yaama- ha'- pa-skoolii -wi ni-oosθe' −0a
not this TIME- go-school -AI 1-grandchild -PERSON
'this grandchild of mine does not go to school'

Refer to the examples below. Hina functions as a third-person singular pronoun.

hina- ha'θepati ni-[t]e-si-naa-pe
3 racoon 1-call-thus-IN.OBJ-1p
'we called him (the Indian Agent) racoon'

we ha'θepati -si -θo -hina
now raccoon name -PASSIVE 3
'then he (the Indian Agent) was named raccoon'

howe-si taakteli -hina
good-AI doctor 3
'he was a good doctor'

Refer to the examples below. Hini fulfills the same functions as above for inanimate nouns. Locational and third-person singular pronominal uses are found in the following examples.

na'θaapi ni-[t]aay-a hini
even 1-REDUP-go that
'I would even go there'

hini- h-i-si-ci-howe
that [h]-say-thus-3-now
'(when) he said that (to me)'

== Person, number, and gender ==
=== Person ===
The choice of person affix may depend on the relative position of the agent and object on the animacy hierarchy. According to Dixon, the animacy hierarchy extends from first-person pronouns, second-person pronouns, third-person pronouns, proper nouns, human common nouns, animate common nouns, and inanimate common nouns.

The affixes in the verb will reflect whether an animate agent is acting on someone or something lower in the animacy scale, or whether he or she is being acted upon by someone or something lower in the animacy scale.

=== Number ===
Shawnee nouns can be singular or plural. Inflectional affixes in the verb stem that cross-reference objects are often omitted if inanimate objects are involved. Even if an inflectional affix for the inanimate object is present, it usually does not distinguish number. For example, in the TI paradigm (animate›inanimate) when there is a second or third-person plural subject, object markers are present in the verb stem, but they are number-indifferent. Overt object markers are omitted for most other subjects. In the inverse situation, (animate‹inanimate) the inanimate participants are not cross-referenced morphologically.

=== Gender ===
The basic distinction for gender in Shawnee is between animate actors and inanimate objects. Nouns are in two gender classes, inanimate and animate; the latter includes all persons, animals, spirits, large trees, and some other objects such as tobacco, maize, apple, raspberry (but not strawberry), calf of leg (but not thigh), stomach, spittle, feather, bird's tail, horn, kettle, pipe for smoking, snowshoe.

Grammatical gender in Shawnee is more accurately signaled by the phonology, not the semantics.

Nouns ending in /-a/ are animate, while nouns ending in /-i/ are inanimate. This phonological criterion is not absolute. Modification by a demonstrative (hina being animate and hini being inanimate, meaning 'that') and pluralization are conclusive tests.

In the singular, Shawnee animate nouns end in /-a/, and the obviative singular morpheme is /-li/.

Shawnee inanimate nouns are usually pluralized with stem +/-ali/.

This causes animate obviative singular and inanimate plural to look alike on the surface.

- example

animate obviative singular

wiskilo'θa-li
bird

inanimate plural

niipit-ali
my teeth

== Orthography ==
During the 19th century, a short-lived Roman-based alphabet was designed for Shawnee by the missionary Jotham Meeker. It was never widely used. Later, native Shawnee speaker Thomas 'Wildcat' Alford devised a highly phonemic and accurate orthography for his 1929 Shawnee translation of the four gospels of the New Testament, but it, too, never attained wide usage.

== Vocabulary ==
English	Shawnee
beard	Kwenaloonaroll
general greeting (in the northeastern dialect)	Hatito
general greeting (in the southern dialect)	Ho
greetings	Bezon (general greeting) Bezon nikanaki (general greeting spoken to a friend) Howisakisiki (daytime greeting) Howisiwapani (morning greeting) Wasekiseki (morning greeting)
how are you?	Hakiwisilaasamamo, Waswasimamo
reply to Hakiwisilaasamamo and Waswasimamo	Niwisilasimamo
