= Tecumseh! =

Fictionalized play about the life of Tehcumseh

- Actor playing Tecumseh giving a speech in Tecumseh!
- Written by: Allan W. Eckert
- Subject: Life of Native American military leader Tecumseh
- Genre: Historical outdoor drama
- Setting: Ohio Country

Premiere
- Date: 1973
- Place: Sugarloaf Mountain Amphitheatre, Chillicothe, Ohio
- tecumsehdrama.com

Tecumseh! is a fictionalized historical outdoor drama about the life of the Native American military leader Tecumseh. The play began in 1973 and is managed by The Scioto Society, written by Allan W. Eckert and held in the Sugarloaf Mountain Amphitheatre, Chillicothe, Ohio.

== Cast ==
As of 2026, the cast of the play is as follows:

- Joshua Barner as Barking Fox (fictional)/Kikusgowlowa (fictional)
- Eliana Tate as Bertha Wood (fictional)
- Jose Marrero as Black Hoof/White Loon
- Evan Davis as Blue Jacket/Roundhead
- Branden Monge as Chiksika/Chaubeenee
- Taavi Crumbley as Frog Hunter (fictional)/Winnemac/Yellow Hawk
- Nancy Mallow-Bentz as Helen Wood (fictional)
- Nate Marcum as James Turner/Captain Blake (fictional)
- Isabel Acevedo as Kesathwa/Muga (fictional)
- Kay Nicht as Lenawawe/Kitate (fictional)
- Caitlin Ledin as Martha Kenton
- Ariana Avila as Melassa Tequi (fictional)
- Tessa Luechtefeld as Rebecca Galloway
- Emily Engemann as Ruthie Calvin
- Jackson Barham as Sikes (fictional)/Captain McDonald
- Caleb Dean Johnson as Simon Kenton
- Trueman Livingston as Spemica Lawba/Running Dog (fictional)
- Allison Hess as Sutawnee (fictional)
- Axyl Langford as Tecumapese
- Colin Swackhammer as Tecumseh
- Bau Tran as Tenskwatawa
- Robert Neal as Tompkins (fictional)
- Kane Waggoner as William Henry Harrison
- Reba Oglesby as Mrs. Galloway
- Tennessee Pitchford as Elijah Berry
- Greaves Ponder as Wasegoboah
- Jake Raiter as James Galloway
- Christopher Rosse as Peshewa/Thin Warrior (fictional)
- Frank Seitz as John Chapman/Sergeant (fictional)
- Titus Shaver as Tim Downing/Captain Dawes (fictional)
- Kevin Snyder as Red Horse/Kothee
- Caleb Speakman as Henry Kaufman/Reverend Woods (fictional)

== History ==
Tecumseh! was first performed at the Sugarloaf Mountain Amphitheater in 1973. It was written by Allan W. Eckert. The play is managed by The Scioto Society, a non-profit organization formed in 1970.

== Graphic novel adaptation ==
A graphic novel adaptation of the play was made by Timothy Truman in 1991.

== Reception ==
It has been praised and described as "epic" by the Chillicothe Gazette. A reviewer, Kathleen S. Conard, from Troy Daily News remarked, "Admittedly, "Tecumseh!" is not a high drama, but it says something that needed to be said, and it says it well." Conard criticized distractions during the play, such as the sounds of frogs making actors hard to hear as well as the chairs used in the amphitheater as seating being too loud. WSYX described it as one of "Ohio's most iconic summer experiences".

It has been criticized for being an example of the vanishing Indian and noble savage Native American stereotypes. The retelling of the fictional folk story revolving a romance between Rebecca Galloway and Tecumseh has also been criticized.

As of 2022, the play has had 2.5 million attendees.

== Bibliography ==
- Barnes, Benjamin J. (2017). "Becoming our Own Storytellers: Tribal Nations Engaging with Academia". In Warren, Stephen (ed.). The Eastern Shawnee Tribe of Oklahoma: Resilience Through Adversity. Norman: University of Oklahoma Press. pp. 217–27. ISBN 978-0-8061-6100-6.
- Eckert, Allen (1974). Tecumseh! A Play. Little, Brown and Company. ISBN 9780316208727.
