= White Feather Spring =

Historic site in Kansas, U.S.

- U.S. National Register of Historic Places
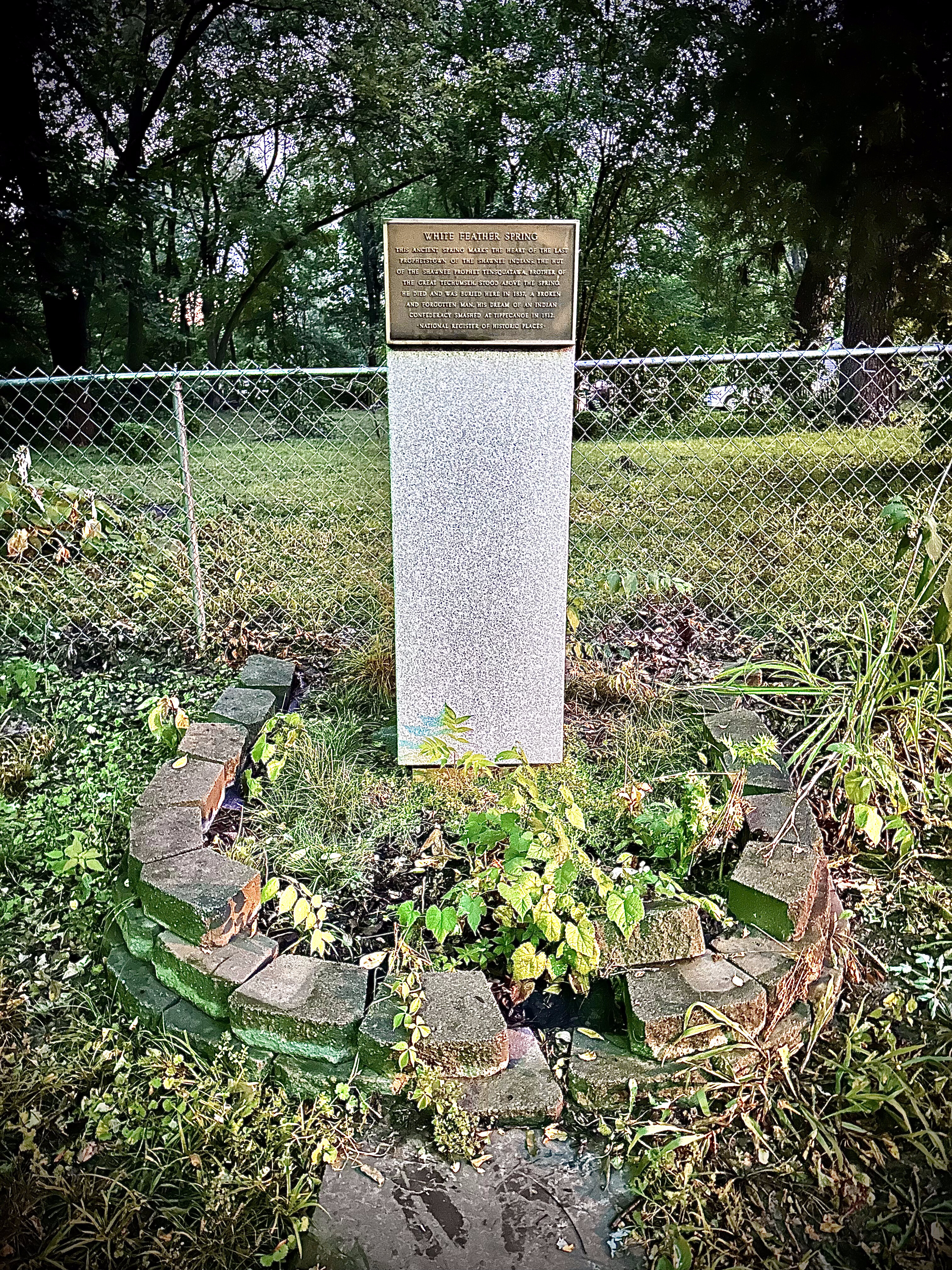
- The marker is near White Feather Spring.
- Location: 3818 Ruby Avenue, Kansas City, Kansas
- Coordinates: 39°4′18.16″N 94°40′24.9″W
- NRHP reference No.: 75000728
- Added to NRHP: 27 August 1975

The White Feather Spring is in the Argentine community of Kansas City, Kansas. It is on private property. White Feather Spring is named after Susan White Feather, the first property owner after the Treaty of 1854 land parceling.

== History ==
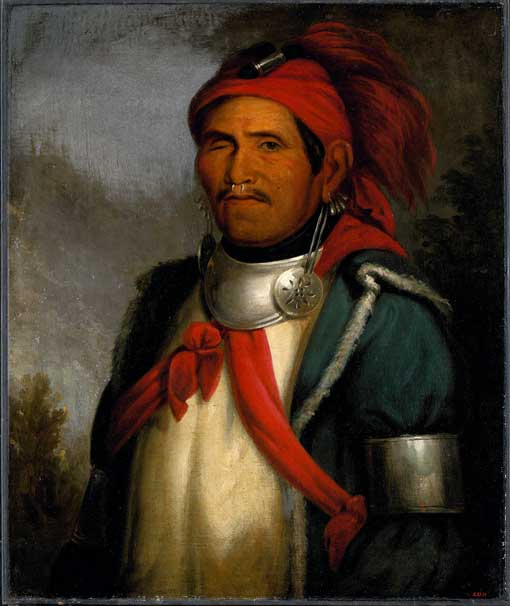
The "Shawnee Prophet", Tenskwatawa, was younger brother to Tecumseh.

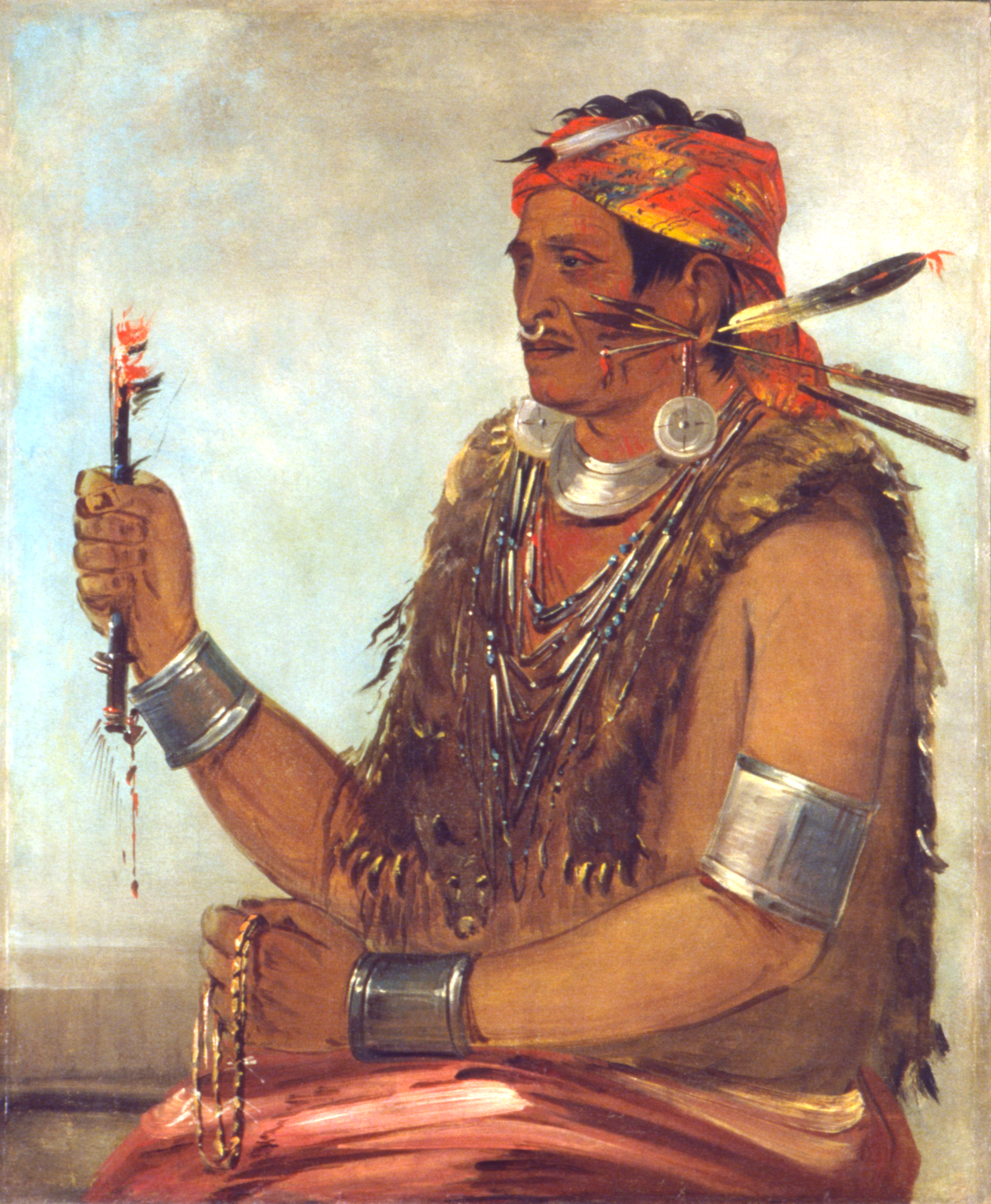
Ten-sqúat-a-way was painted by George Catlan.

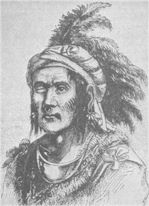
Tenskwatawa

In 1826, Tenskwatawa established a village at a site in modern Kansas City, Kansas. Tensquatawa, known as the Shawnee Prophet, was the younger brother of the Shawnee war chief, Tecumseh. Tensquatawa built Prophetstown near the present South 26th Street and Woodend Avenue in Kansas City, Kansas. He later moved from there to White Feather Spring. He died here in November 1836. It is located in the Argentine community of Kansas City, Kansas.

The grave of the Prophet, about 75-100 yards to the northwest of his home, was not marked for around sixty years. An editor of the Kansas City Sun, E. F. Heisler, in 1897 went to the Indian Territory and got Charles Bluejacket, who had been present at the Prophet's burial when he was 20 years old, to locate the grave. He located the natural spring, where the Prophet's home was and told those present where the Prophet's grave was. A temporary marker was placed but later removed. No permanent marker was installed and the exact grave location is not known.
