= Family of Tecumseh =

Family members of Shawnee leader Tecumseh

- Shawnee leadership family
- Tecumseh, the family's most prominent member
- Current region: Ohio Country, later Indiana Territory
- Origin: Kispoko band, Shawnee Nation
- Founder: Puckeshinwau (c. 1720s–1774)
- Final head: Tenskwatawa (d. 1836)
- Members: Puckeshinwau (father); Methotaske (mother); Tecompolis Ick (eldest sister); Cheeseekau (eldest son); Tecumapease (daughter); Sauaweseekau (son); Tecumseh (son); Tenskwatawa (son)

The family of Tecumseh (c. 1768 – October 5, 1813), the Shawnee leader, has long been the subject of inquiry by historians. The documentary evidence of his personal life is fragmentary, with frequently contradictory evidence, and historians have often reached differing conclusions about significant details.

== Parents ==
Tecumseh's father, Puckshinwa (in Shawnee, Puckeshinwau), meaning "alights from flying", "something that drops", or "I light from flying", and rendered in various records as Puckeshinwa, Pucksinwah, Pukshinwa, Pukeesheno, Pekishinoah, Pooksehnwe and other variations) was a minor Shawnee war chief of the Kispoko ("Dancing Tail" or "Panther") band and the panther clan. According to some sources, Puckshinwa's father was Muscogee (Creek) and his mother was Shawnee. (Either his father died when Puckshinwa was young or because among the Creeks a husband lives with his wife's family, Puckshinwa was considered a Shawnee.) Tecumseh biographer John Sugden concludes that Puckshinwa's ancestry "must remain a mystery", because other testimonies provide alternate details of his heritage, such as stating that the Kispoko chief had a British father. (Note: Sugden explained that Anthony Shane, "a mixed-blood who spent most of his life in Shawnee towns", and his wife Lameteshe, "one of Tecumseh's kindred", claimed that Puckshinwau's father was British and his mother was Shawnee.) (Note: Although the claim has not been endorsed by major later historians, according to one white family's tradition, Tecumseh's father was reputed to have been one of their relatives who was born in Crawford County, Indiana, and raised since childhood among the Shawnee.)

Tecumseh's mother, Methotaske (in Shawnee, Methoataaskee, meaning "[one who] lays eggs in the sand" or "a turtle laying eggs in the sand", and alternately spelled Methoataske, Meetheetashe, Methotase, or Methoatase), was Puckshinwa's second wife. She is believed to have been either Muscogee Creek, Cherokee, or Shawnee through both her parents, possibly of the Pekowi band and the turtle clan. Some traditions argue that Methotaske was Creek because she had lived among that tribe prior to marriage, while others claim that she was Cherokee, having died in old age living among that tribe. Others suggest that she was a white captive due to the family stories that claim Puckshinwa had been married to a white captive. Puckshinwa and Methotaske had at least eight children. Shawnee divisional identity was recorded patrilineally, meaning that inheritance and descent are traced through the male line, which made Tecumseh and his siblings members of the Kispoko.

When Tecumseh's parents met and married, the Pekowi were living somewhere near the present-day site of Tuscaloosa, Alabama. The Pekowi had lived in that region alongside the Creek people, since the Iroquois (a powerful confederacy based in New York and Pennsylvania) forced them from the Ohio River valley during the Beaver Wars in the seventeenth century. About 1759 the Pekowi band moved north into the Ohio Country. Not wanting to force Methotaske to choose between staying in the south with him or moving with her family, Puckshinwa decided to travel north with her. The Pekowi founded an Indian settlement named Chillicothe, where Tecumseh was likely born.

== Siblings ==
Tecumseh had eight siblings; he had three older brothers, two older sisters, and two younger brothers. The eldest sibling was Tecompolis Ick (c. 1756 - 1825) Eldest brother was Cheeseekau (c. 1761–1792). Although primarily remembered as the eldest brother and mentor of Tecumseh, Cheeseekau was a well-known war chief in his own time. The third child in the family was Tecumapease ("Flying Over the Water"), also called Menewaulaakoosee. . She and Tecumseh were close. She married Wahsikegaboe ("Stands Firm"), who became one of Tecumseh's leading supporters.

The fourth child in the family was Sauaweseekau ("Jumping Panther"). He grew to be a warrior, and was killed in the Northwest Indigenous War, possibly in the 1794 Battle of Fallen Timbers. The next sibling in the family was a brother named Nehaaseemoo. Because a tradition claimed that Tecumseh had two sisters, one 20th century Tecumseh biographer decided that Nehaaseemoo must have been a female, but Sugden (1997) argues the evidence is incontrovertible that he was a male.

Tecumseh, the sixth child of the family, was born around 1768. In 1775, not long after Puckshinwa had been killed in the Battle of Point Pleasant, Methotaske gave birth to triplets. One of the three died at birth. Of the two boys who survived, one was Kumskaukau ("A Cat That Flies in the Air"), who grew to be a well-liked man with many friends, and a follower of Tecumseh. The other was named Laloeshiga ("A Panther with a Handsome Tail"). Laloeshiga later became well-known as Tenskwatawa (1775–1836), the Shawnee Prophet.

== Wives and children ==
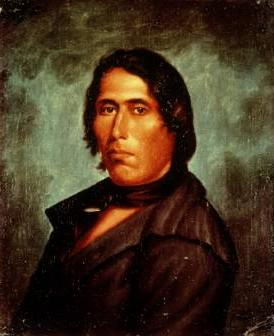
In the 20th century, this painting was claimed to be a long-lost portrait of Tecumseh. It is probably not Tecumseh, but is possibly his son Paukeesaa.

Tecumseh's first wife Mamate was the mother of his first son; Paukeesaa, born about 1796. Their marriage did not last, and Tecumapese raised Paukeesaa from the age of seven or eight. He married twice more during this time. His third marriage, to White Wing, lasted until 1807.
