= Cheeseekau =

Shawnee war chief and brother of Tecumseh (c. 1760–1792)

Kispoko Shawnee leader
- Succeeded by: Tecumseh

Personal details
- Born: c. 1760 Tallapoosa River, present-day Alabama
- Died: October 1, 1792 Southwest Territory (present-day Tennessee)
- Relations: Tecumseh (brother); Tenskwatawa (brother); Sauwaseekau (brother); Nehaseemo (brother); Kumskaukau (brother); Tecumapease (sister)
- Parent(s): Puckeshinwau (father); Methoataaskee (mother)
- Nickname: Matthew

Military service
- Battles/wars: American Revolutionary War; Cherokee-American wars

Cheeseekau (c. 1760 – October 1, 1792), also known as Pepquannakek (Gunshot), Popoquan (Gun), Sting, and Chiksika, was a war chief of the Kispoko division of the Shawnee Nation. Although primarily remembered as the eldest brother and mentor of Tecumseh, who became famous after Cheeseekau's death, Cheeseekau was a well-known leader in his own time and a contemporary of Blue Jacket.

Few details are known about Cheeseekau's early life. He may have been born along the Tallapoosa River in what is now Alabama. His parents, Puckeshinwau and Methoataaskee, moved north to the Ohio Country around the time of his birth. After Puckeshinwau's death in the Battle of Point Pleasant in 1774, Cheeseekau assumed much of the responsibility for his younger brothers, including Tecumseh and Tenskwatawa.

During the American Revolutionary War (1775–1783), Cheeseekau joined those Shawnees who allied themselves with the British and sought to drive American settlers out of Kentucky. After the war, as Americans expanded into Ohio, Cheeseekau led a group of Shawnees to Tennessee in 1788. American colonists were moving to Tennessee too, and Cheeseekau resettled his band at the village of Running Water on the Tennessee River, where he joined Dragging Canoe's militant Chickamauga Cherokee in fighting American expansion. He died on October 1, 1792, after being mortally wounded during an attack on Buchanan's Station, a frontier fort near Nashville, Tennessee.

== Sources ==
- Brown, John P. (1938). Old Frontiers: The Story of the Cherokee Indians from Earliest Times to the Date of Their Removal to the West, 1838. Kingsport, TN: Southern Publishers. OCLC 313236.
- Drake, Benjamin (1852). Life of Tecumseh and of His Brother the Prophet. Cincinnati: H.S. & J. Applegate & Co. OCLC 3867441.
- Eckert, Allan W. (1992). A Sorrow in Our Heart: The Life of Tecumseh. New York: Bantam. ISBN 978-0-553-08023-0.
- Raymond, Ethel T. (1920). Tecumseh: A Chronicle of the Last Great Leader of His People. Toronto: Glasgow, Brook. OCLC 2067134.
- Sugden, John (1997). Tecumseh: A Life. New York: Holt. ISBN 978-0-8050-4138-5.
- Sugden, John (1999). "Cheeseekau". In Garraty, John A.; Carnes, Mark C. (eds.). American National Biography. Vol. 4. New York: Oxford University Press. pp. 767–68. ISBN 978-0-19-512783-6.
