= Tenskwatawa =

Shawnee Native American leader, brother of Tecumseh (1775–1836)

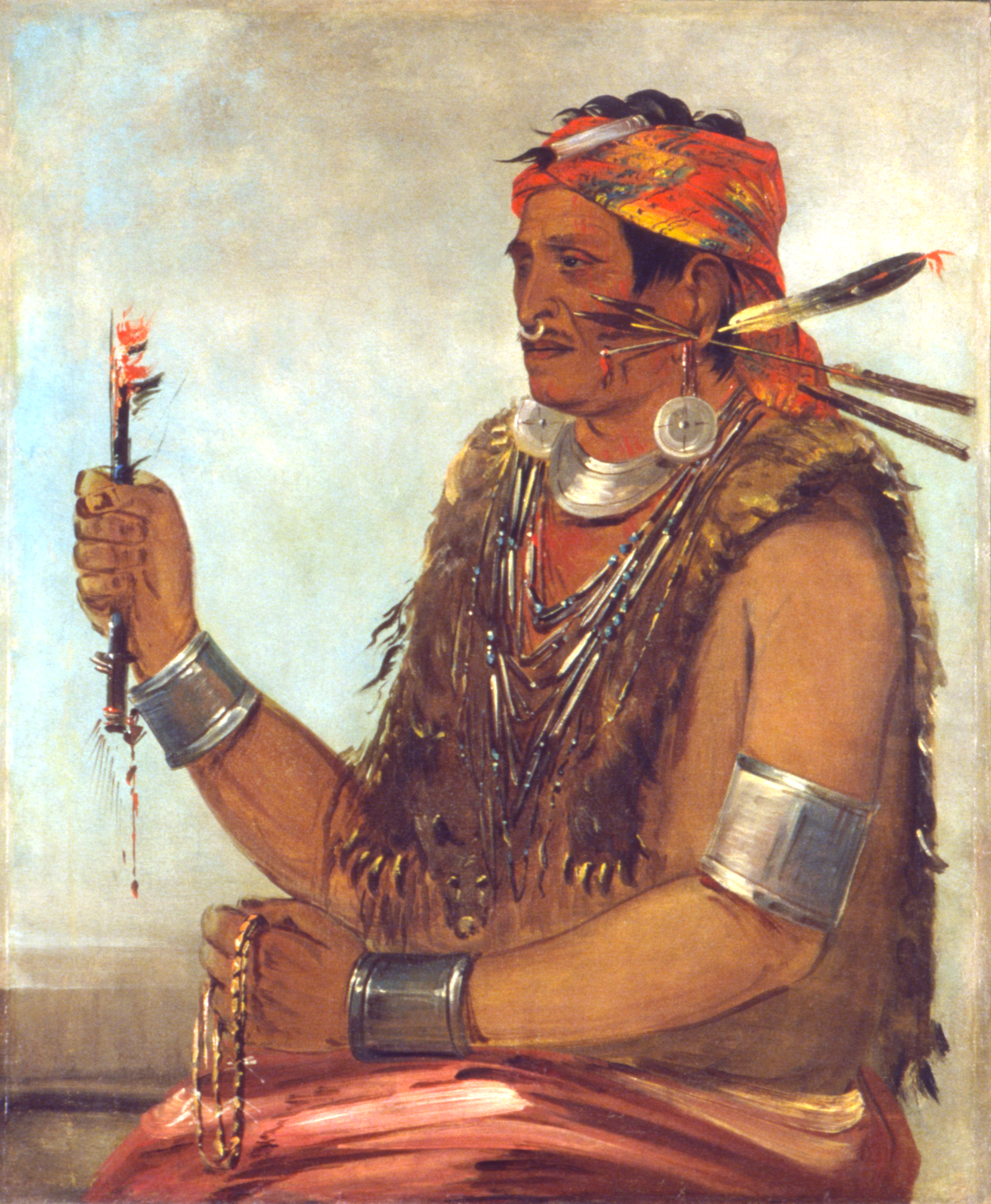
- Born: January 1775; Ohio Country
- Died: November 1836 (aged 61); Shawnee Reservation (modern day Argentine, Kansas, U.S.)
- Resting place: Near White Feather Spring, Kansas City, Kansas, U.S.
- Relatives: Tecumseh (brother); Cheeseekau (brother)

Tenskwatawa (/ˌtənskwɒtɒweɪ/; also called Tenskatawa, Tenskwatawah, Tensquatawa or Lalawethika) (January 1775 – November 1836) was a Native American religious and political leader of the Shawnee people, known as the Prophet or the Shawnee Prophet. He was a younger brother of Tecumseh, a leader of the Shawnee. In his early years Tenskwatawa was given the name Lalawethika ("He Makes a Loud Noise" or "The Noise Maker"), but he changed it around 1805 and transformed himself from a hapless, alcoholic youth into a spiritual leader.

In the early 1800s, Tenskwatawa formed a community with his followers near Greenville in western Ohio, and in 1808 he and Tecumseh established a village that the Americans called Prophetstown north of present-day Lafayette, Indiana. At Prophetstown, the brothers' Pan-American Indian resistance movement increased to include thousands of followers, and Tenskwatawa provided the spiritual foundation. Together, they mobilized the Indigenous American Nations in the Northwest Territory to fight settlers.

On November 7, 1811, while Tecumseh was away, Tenskwatawa ordered the pre-dawn attack on a hostile, encroaching military force encamped near Prophetstown that initiated the Battle of Tippecanoe. The American Indians retreated after a two-hour engagement and abandoned Prophetstown, which the Americans burned to the ground. The battle did not end the American Indians' resistance against the United States, but he lost his influence, became an outcast, and moved to Canada during the War of 1812. After Tecumseh was killed at the Battle of the Thames in 1813, the American Indian resistance movement faltered and was eventually defeated. Tenskwatawa remained as an exile in Canada for nearly a decade. He returned to the United States in 1824 to assist the U.S. government with the Shawnee removal to reservation land in present-day Kansas. The aging Prophet arrived at the Shawnee reservation in 1828 and faded into obscurity. Tenskwatawa died at what is known as the Argentine district of present-day Kansas City, Kansas, in 1836.

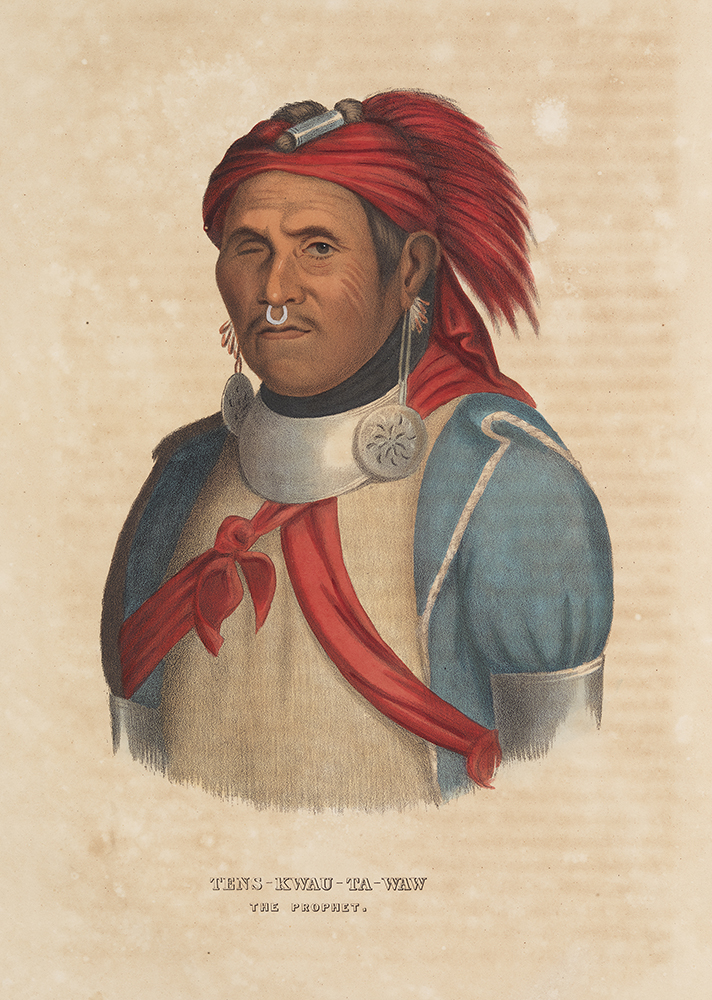
The ones who open the door drawing

== Early life and family ==
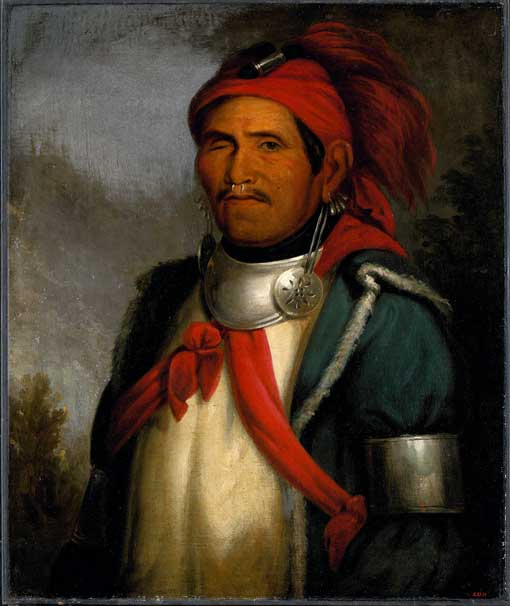
Portrait by Charles Bird King

Lalawethika ("He Makes a Loud Noise" or "Noise Maker"), who as an adult changed his name to Tenskwatawa ("Open Door" or "One With Open Mouth"), was one of a set of triplet brothers born in early 1775 to Puckeshinwa and Methoataske in a Shawnee village along the Mad River in western Ohio. One of the triplets died within the first year of his birth, but Tenskwatawa and his surviving triplet, Kumskaukau, were members of a family that included at least eight children (three daughters and five sons). Lalawethika's early years showed no evidence of the powerful spiritual leader he would become as an adult. Instead, his sad and isolated youth was marked by numerous failures and alcoholism.

Tenskwatawa's father, Puckenshinwa ("Something That Falls"), was a leader of the Kispokotha division of the Shawnee. He was killed fighting against the Virginia militia in the Battle of Point Pleasant before Tenskwatawa was born. His mother, Methoataske (or Methoataaskee, meaning "[One who] Lays Eggs in the Sand"), is believed to be either Muscogee Creek, Cherokee, or Shawnee, possibly of Pekowi division and the Turtle Clan. Methoataske, who was frightened by the American Revolution and deeply saddened by the death of Puckenshinwa, may have gone to live with her Creek relatives and then moved west with the Kispokothas in 1779, leaving Tenskwatawa and his siblings in the care of their older sister, Tecumpeas, who was married.

Tenskwatawa, who was not as successful or brave as his brothers, was a failure "at almost everything he attempted" during his youth. When Chiksika, his oldest brother and a leading warrior, took his brothers out to hunt and fight in small battles, Tenskwatawa stayed behind because he lacked competence as a skilled hunter and warrior. Tenskwatawa was never able to distinguish himself as a hunter or fighter as Tecumseh, another of his older brothers. Tecumseh, who was seven years older, was an especially gifted athlete who became the favorite of most of the tribe. In contrast, Tenskwatawa was isolated, unpopular, and depressed by his lack of success. He began drinking alcohol, which further lowered his self-esteem and increased his problems. He also blinded himself in his right eye with his own arrow when he was younger. Lonely and insecure, Tenskwatawa attempted to make up for his deficiencies by boasting and making up stories about how talented and important he was. His depression and alcoholism worsened as he grew older, making him unable to provide for his wife and several children.

In 1794, nineteen-year-old Tenskwatawa was present at the Battle of Fallen Timbers with two of his brothers, Tecumseh and Sauwauseekau, but he did not distinguish himself as a warrior. Instead, Tenskwatawa viewed the battle as a chance to re-insert himself into tribal society. In his late twenties, he decided to become a medicine man and apprenticed with a tribal healer, Penagashea ("Changing Feathers"). However, when Tenskawatawa was unable to save his people after they fell seriously ill, probably with influenza, he became humiliated and even more depressed. By the early 1800s, Tenskawatawa had developed a reputation as a notorious drunk among the Shawnee living along the White River.

== Purification movement leader ==
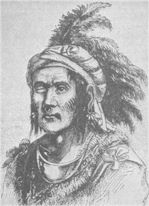
Tenskwatawa sketch

In 1795, after the Battle of Fallen Timbers, the Indians of the Old Northwest signed the Treaty of Greenville with the American government, in which they agreed to surrender most of modern Ohio. In return, the American government promised to allow them to retain the remainder of the Northwest Territory forever. After 1803, however, the main official in the Northwest, William Henry Harrison, began pressuring the tribes of the Old Northwest to cede more land west of the Greenville line. President Thomas Jefferson and Harrison tried to pressure the tribes into adopting Euro-American customs, especially European-style farming. They hoped that such acculturation would make the tribes more willing to cede additional land but also believed that they could force the tribes into acculturating by pressuring them to cede more of their remaining territory. To this end, Jefferson encouraged American officials in the Northwest to deliberately entrap the tribes of the region in debt to force them to cede land. Many established chiefs, such as Black Hoof and Little Turtle, encouraged their followers to adopt European customs and tried to maintain good relations with the American government. After 1803, Harrison convinced some pro-accommodation chiefs to cede large areas of land west of the Greenville line. The American government paid for these cessions with annuities, which it placed under the control of the pro-accommodation chiefs. Many Indians saw these payments as bribes to the pro-accommodation chiefs.

These land cessions were also controversial because the American government generally paid the tribes far less than the market price of the land which it acquired. Moreover, Harrison often bought land from tribes which had relatively weak claims to it, while ignoring the stronger claims of other tribes. Meanwhile, Euro-American settlers rapidly moved onto the lands which the tribes of the Old Northwest had not yet ceded. Many settlers sold alcohol to the tribes, contributing to a growing problem of drunkenness. The land cessions, along with these trends, contributed to growing discontent among the tribes of the Old Northwest and gradually undermined the authority of the pro-accommodation chiefs. The stage was thus set for the emergence of a nativist movement.

Beginning in 1805, Lalawethika had a series of religious visions that transformed his life, caused him to change his name to Tenskwatawa (meaning "Open Door"), and led him to reject his old ways. He experienced his first vision in May 1805, when he fell into unconsciousness during one of his alcoholic stupors and was thought to be dead. Unexpectedly reviving as his body was being prepared for burial, he recounted a powerful vision of two different worlds, one filled with ample blessings for the virtuous ones who lived as the master of life intended, while the other world was filled with pain, hardship, and terror for those who refused to follow traditional tribal ways. Tenskwatawa became known as "The Prophet", began preaching and gathered a growing number of followers. He soon emerged as a powerful and influential spiritual leader. More visions followed in succeeding months, including revelations that the European invaders from the east were "the children of the evil spirit".

The Prophet's developing purification movement caused him to urge his followers to reject European habits, such as consumption of alcohol, and to return to their traditional ways. He wanted his people to reject the white man's customs by forbidding marriages between Indians and whites, as well as the use of Euro-American foods, clothing, and manufactured goods. Tenskwatawa also encouraged his people to follow traditional gender roles (women as farmers, men as hunters and warriors). Tenskwatawa proved to be harsh, even brutal, in his treatment of those who opposed him and his teachings. He accused his detractors, and anyone who associated with settlers, of witchcraft, including Indians who had converted to Christianity. For Tenskwatawa, Indian witches remained the most active agents of the evil spirits on earth, and he sought to identify and destroy them.

== Greenville and Prophetstown founder ==
In 1805, Tenskwatawa, who evolved into an effective speaker and charismatic leader of his religious movement, formed a new community with his followers along the White River, near the present site of Greenville in western Ohio. Harrison, the governor of Indiana Territory, derided Tenskwatawa as a fraud. He wrote a letter to the Delawares urging them to challenge Tenskwatawa to "cause the sun to stand still ... or the dead to rise from their graves", adding that "If he does these things you may then believe that he has been sent by God." He also had the letter printed in a major newspaper. Tenskwatawa responded by correctly predicting that an eclipse would occur on June 16, 1806. This prediction strengthened his credibility and humiliated Harrison.

The Prophet detested the leaders of the United States government, including Jefferson and Harrison. Tenskwatawa also opposed some tribal leaders, such as Little Turtle, and their representatives because he felt that they had agreed to the demands of the government. When some of the tribal chiefs tried to promote compromise and conciliation with the United States, Tenskwatawa, proclaiming his obedience to the Great Spirit, lashed out against the pro-U.S. sympathizers and castigated them as wicked traitors.

While the Prophet continued to preach unity among his people, urging them to resist the government and the settlers' way of life, Tecumseh began to gather the tribes at Greenville to establish a pan-Indian resistance movement. Officials in Ohio became concerned about the increasing numbers of the Prophet's followers. As the settlers became more hostile and planned to take action, Tenskwatawa was finding it increasingly difficult to feed his expanding village. Although there was opposition from some tribal leaders such as Little Turtle, Tenskwatawa decided to move farther west and establish a village in a more remote location to further distance his followers from the settlers.

Restored prairie at Prophetstown State Park, near the site of Prophetstown, Indiana, 2026

In 1808, Tenskwatawa and Tecumseh founded a new village along the Tippecanoe River, north of present-day Lafayette, Indiana. The settlers called the Indian village Prophetstown, after the Shawnee spiritual leader. Prophetstown soon expanded into a large, multi-tribal community of the Prophet's followers that became a "powerful Indian city-state" for his spiritual movement. Willig (1997) argues that Prophetstown became the largest Native American community in the Great Lakes region and served as a major center of Indian culture, a temporary barrier to the encroaching settlers' westward movement, and a base to expel the whites and their culture from the territory. Located near the juncture of two rivers, the Wabash and Tippecanoe Rivers, Prophetstown gained significance as a central point in the political and military alliance that was forming around Tecumseh, as well as the spiritual hub of the purification movement that the Prophet established to preserve tribal culture.

Under the leadership of Tenskwatawa and Tecumseh, the village attracted thousands of Algonquin-speaking Indians. Although the village endured hardships, such as food shortages, epidemics, and tribal disagreements, Prophetstown became an intertribal, religious stronghold within the Indiana Territory for 3,000 Native Americans. An estimated 14 different tribal groups comprised the confederation at Prophetstown, but the majority of its inhabitants came from Shawnee, Delaware, and Potawatomi tribes. The growing community also caused settlers in the area to fear that Tecumseh was forming an army of warriors to destroy their settlements. There were also some Tutelo as well.

One effect of the increasing pan-Indian alliance was steady pressure from Harrison and the U.S. government to establish land-cession treaties, including a pivotal one made in 1809. Under the terms of the Treaty of Fort Wayne, the tribes in the Wabash River area ceded an estimated 2.5 to 3 million acres of land to the U.S. government. While warriors continued to congregate at Prophetstown, Tenskwatawa and Tecumseh, who adamantly wanted to retain their independence from the United States, denounced the treaty. They became openly hostile to those who had signed it, including other tribal leaders, and began discussions of a possible alliance with the British.

== War with the United States ==
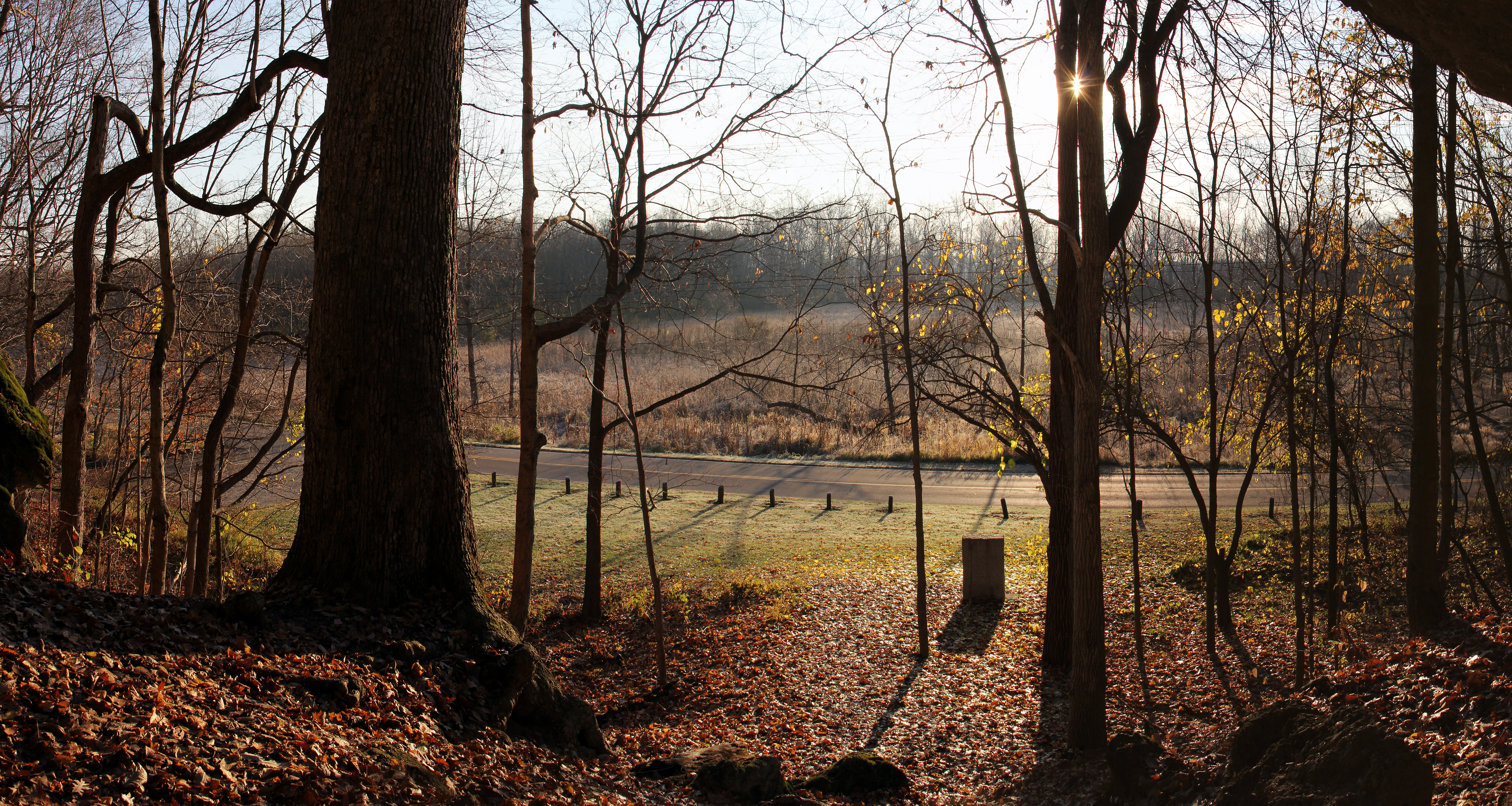
The view from Prophet's Rock, looking toward the site of the Battle of Tippecanoe

Although historians have disagreed over whether Tecumseh or Tenskwatawa was the primary leader of the pan-Indian community that grew up around Prophetstown, Tenskwatawa remained its spiritual leader; however, his preaching grew more militant and increasingly political from 1808 to 1811. Some of Prophetstown's inhabitants became nervous about the rising tension between settlers and natives and left the village, but Tecumseh and Tenskwatawa continued to recruit young warriors to join their movement. By 1811, white settlers in the region, Harrison, and the Indiana territorial government had become concerned about the large number of Indians gathering at Prophetstown. After ongoing negotiations between Harrison and Tecumseh proved unproductive in 1811, Harrison decided to strike first and began to assemble his military forces.

In the fall of 1811, when Tecumseh journeyed south to meet with representatives of other tribes in hopes of building a larger alliance, Tenskwatawa was left in command at Prophetstown. Before Tecumseh's departure, the two brothers discussed possible responses to U.S. military action and agreed that Tenskwatawa would try to avoid any confrontation during Tecumseh's absence. However, Tenskwatawa reconsidered the decision after Tecumseh's departure and prepared their warriors to fight the settlers if they approached Prophetstown. In the meantime, Harrison and his men began their march north from Vincennes toward Prophetstown and constructed a new fort (Fort Harrison) on Indian treaty land at the site of present-day Terre Haute, Indiana, to serve as a staging area for their military forces. As Harrison's army marched toward Prophetstown, Tenskwatawa decided to stand firm and take action.

On November 6, 1811, while Tecumseh was still in the South, a United States military force of an estimated 1,000 men under Harrison's command approached the village. Hoping to delay a confrontation until additional warriors arrived, Tenskwatawa requested a meeting with Harrison, who agreed to negotiate. With the meeting set for the following day, Harrison and his men set up camp about a mile from Prophetstown.

Although they were slightly outnumbered and had little ammunition, Tenskwatawa's force of 600 to 700 men attacked before dawn on November 7. This attack failed, and during the evening Tenskwatawa consulted with the spirits and decided that sending a party to assassinate Harrison in his tent was the best way to avoid a battle. He assured the warriors that he would cast spells that would make them immune to their bullets and any other harm as well as confuse Harrison's army so they would not resist. The warriors moved out and began to surround Harrison's army, looking for a way to enter the camp undetected. After a two-hour engagement that became known as the Battle of Tippecanoe, Tenskwatawa's forces retreated from the field and abandoned Prophetstown to avoid capture. On November 8, Harrison's army burned the village to the ground. Nearly one-fifth of Harrison's forces either died or were wounded in battle (according to one source, 188 casualties; 63 of them fatalities). Harrison claimed hundreds of Indian fatalities; however, the actual number fell, according to another source, between thirty and fifty, with an additional seventy to eighty wounded. Tenskwatawa, who did not take part in the action on the field, remained out of range of U.S. bullets.

The battle did not end the Indians' resistance to the United States, but their retreat caused the Prophet, who proved to be a poor military leader, to lose his influence. Some of the Indians wanted to kill him for losing, but his life was spared; others sought revenge by raiding area farms and travelers. When Tecumseh returned to the Indiana Territory, he resumed his role as the Indian confederation's military leader, but the loss at Prophetstown ended his efforts to establish a stronger Indian alliance. Tenskwatawa became an outcast, and some of his followers returned to rebuild Prophetstown in July 1812, but settler militia forces eventually forced them away. The Prophet moved to Canada and became one of Tecumseh's subordinates during the War of 1812.

The end of the Indians' military resistance to the U.S. occurred in Canada, where Tecumseh and his warriors participated in the defence of the Canadian colonies. Tecumseh fought and died at the Battle of the Thames in October 1813. Tenskwatawa, who observed the battle from a position behind the British line, fled on horseback after the initial charge from the American forces. He remained in exile in Canada and did not return to the United States until 1824.

== Later years ==
After Tecumseh's death in 1813, Tenskwatawa retained a small group of followers, but had no significant leadership position among the American Indians in the subsequent decade. In 1824, at the request of Lewis Cass, the governor of Michigan Territory, the aging Prophet returned to the United States to assist the federal government with its plans for the Shawnee removal west of the Mississippi River. Tenskwatawa hoped his involvement would allow him to regain some influence as a leader among the Shawnee.

In 1826, Tenskwatawa traveled through Vincennes with a group of 500 Shawnee from reservation land at Wapaghkonetta, Ohio, and headed west across the Mississippi and Kansas Rivers to the Shawnee reservation in present-day Kansas. Tenskwatawa, who arrived in Kansas on May 14, 1828, established a village called Prophetstown on reservation land in the Argentine district of present-day Kansas City, Kansas.

In his final years, as his influence among the Shawnee declined, Tenskwatawa isolated himself from the majority of the tribe. A few years before his death, Tenskwatawa agreed to pose for George Catlin, who painted his portrait as a Shawnee "holy man" in traditional attire. Tenskwatawa departed to Kansas and lived there in obscurity for twelve years until his death.

== Death and legacy ==
Tenskwatawa died in November 1836 at his cabin, a site in present-day Kansas City's Argentine district. The White Feather Spring historical marker, erected in 1978, denotes the approximate location of his gravesite in Kansas City, which remained unmarked for decades. Tenskwatawa's legacy was a mix of successes and failures. While he became a powerful spiritual leader with hundreds of followers in the first decade of the 19th century, his success in that effort only lasted about six years. The Prophet transformed himself from a hapless, alcoholic youth filled with failures into an influential religious leader. Tenskwatawa preached unity and helped to improve the morale of his people by encouraging them to pursue traditional ways. He also remained resolute in his rejection from his family and of the United States authority and acculturation to the Euro-American way of life. After the defeat of his people at the Battle of Tippecanoe, the Prophet spent the remainder of his life trying to regain some of his previous political power. Tenskwatawa and Tecumseh along with their followers were not successful in achieving the long-term results they wanted. They lost a difficult and violent struggle that deprived them of their lands in the Northwest Territory, largely because of the relentlessness and large-scale efforts of the United States, but their defiance was a noble effort.

Because most white Americans of his era were unfamiliar with Native American culture, they did not understand the Prophet's religious movement. Since his death in 1836, the Prophet has been relegated to a secondary role. Those who knew Tenskwatawa after 1825, when he no longer had his previous influence as a religious leader, described him as a "shallow opportunist". However, it was Tenskwatawa, not Tecumseh, who provided the spiritual foundation for the Indian resistance movement in the Midwest in the years immediately preceding the War of 1812. In the Indiana Territory, the violence that erupted between the U.S. and the pan-Indian alliance that Tenskwatawa and Tecumseh established at Prophetstown led to the relocation of territorial capital from Vincennes to Corydon, Indiana. In addition, U.S. efforts to remove Indian inhabitants from the Indiana Territory increased after the War of 1812 and led to their forced removal to reservations in the trans-Mississippi west.

== See also ==
- Native American temperance activists

== General and cited references ==
- Cayton, Andrew R. L. (1996). Frontier Indiana. Bloomington: Indiana University Press. ISBN 978-0253330482.
- Dell Comics (1956). Ben Bowie and His Mountain Men. Vol. 7. Western Printing and Lithographing Company.
- Edmunds, R. David (1985). The Shawnee Prophet. Lincoln: University of Nebraska Press. ISBN 978-0-8032-1850-5.
- Edmunds, R. David. (1983). "Tecumseh, The Shawnee Prophet, and American History: A Reassessment". Western Historical Quarterly. 14 (3): 261–276. doi:10.2307/969620. JSTOR 969620. (Argues the Prophet was much more important than Tecumseh.)
- Indiana's 200: The People Who Shaped the Hoosier State. Indianapolis: Indiana Historical Society Press. 2015. pp. 346–48. ISBN 978-0-87195-387-2.
- Madison, James H. (2014). Hoosiers: A New History of Indiana. Bloomington and Indianapolis: Indiana University Press and the Indiana Historical Society Press. ISBN 978-0-253-01308-8.
- Madison, James H., and Lee Ann Sandweiss (2014). Hoosiers and the American Story. Indianapolis: Indiana Historical Society Press. pp. 13–16. ISBN 978-0-87195-363-6.
- Owens, Robert M. (2007). Mr. Jefferson's Hammer: William Henry Harrison and the Origins of American Indian Policy. Norman, Oklahoma: University of Oklahoma Press. ISBN 978-0-8061-3842-8.* Schutz, Noel. "The Family of Tecumseh and Tenskwatawa".
- "Shawnee Indians – Wapakoneta Ohio – Vincennes Indiana". Boston Reporter and Telegraph. December 15, 1826. p. 3.
- "Shawnee Prophet's Grave and White Feather Spring, 1836" (PDF). Unified Government of Wyandotte County and Kansas City, Kansas.
- "The Family of Tecumseh and Tenskwatawa".
- Sugden, John (1997). Tecumseh: A Life. New York: Henry Holt and company. ISBN 978-0-8050-4138-5.
- White, Richard (1991). The Middle Ground: Indians, Empires, and Republics in the Great Lakes Region, 1650–1815. Cambridge University Press. ISBN 978-0-521-42460-8.
- Willig, Timothy D. (March 1997). "Prophetstown on the Wabash: The Native Spiritual Defense of the Old Northwest". Michigan Historical Review. 23 (2): 115–158. doi:10.2307/20173677. JSTOR 20173677.
- Willig, Timothy D. (2008). Restoring the Chain of Friendship: British Policy and the Indians of the Great Lakes, 1783-1815. Lincoln: University of Nebraska Press. ISBN 978-0803248175.
