= Tecumseh =

Shawnee Native American military leader (1768-1813)

- Painting of Tecumseh based on an 1808 sketch (Note: This 1915 painting is based on a black and white engraving published by Benson John Lossing in 1868. Before Lossing's was published, no authentic portrait of Tecumseh was known to exist. Lossing said his portrait was based on a sketch of Tecumseh made in 1808 by Pierre Le Dru, a French trader in Vincennes. Lossing altered the original by putting Tecumseh in a British Army uniform, based on the erroneous belief that Tecumseh had been appointed a brigadier general.)

Shawnee (Kispoko division, Panther clan) leader

Personal details
- Born: c. March 9, 1768 Shawnee territory, Ohio Country (present-day Chillicothe, Ohio)
- Died: October 5, 1813 (aged 45) Moraviantown, Upper Canada
- Cause of death: Killed in the Battle of the Thames
- Spouses: Mamate; White Wing
- Relations: Cheeseekau (brother); Tenskwatawa (brother); Tecumapease (sister); Nehaaseemo (brother)
- Children: Paukeesaa (son); Daughter (name unknown)
- Parents: Puckeshinwau (father); Methoataaskee (mother)

Military service
- Battles/wars: Northwest Indian War; War of 1812

Tecumseh (/tɪˈkʌmsə, -si/ tih-KUM-sə, -see; March 9, 1768 – October 5, 1813) was a Shawnee chief and warrior who promoted resistance to the expansion of the United States onto Native American lands. A persuasive orator, Tecumseh traveled widely, forming a Native American confederacy and promoting intertribal unity. Even though his efforts to unite Native Americans ended with his death in battle during the War of 1812, he became a folk hero in American, Indigenous, and Canadian popular history.

Tecumseh was born in what is now Ohio at a time when the far-flung Shawnees were reuniting in their Ohio Country homeland. During his childhood, the Shawnees lost territory to the expanding American colonies in a series of border conflicts. Tecumseh's father was killed in the 1774 Battle of Point Pleasant. Tecumseh was thereafter taught by his older brother Cheeseekau, a noted war chief who died fighting Americans in 1792. As a young war leader, Tecumseh joined Shawnee Chief Blue Jacket's armed struggle against further American encroachment, which ended in defeat at the Battle of Fallen Timbers in 1794 and with the loss of most of Ohio in the 1795 Treaty of Greenville.

In 1805, Tecumseh's younger brother Tenskwatawa founded a religious movement that called upon Native Americans to reject European influences and return to a more traditional lifestyle. In 1808, Tecumseh and Tenskwatawa established Prophetstown, a village in present-day Indiana, that grew into a large, multi-tribal community. Tecumseh proclaimed that Native Americans owned their lands in common and urged tribes not to cede more territory unless all agreed. His message alarmed American leaders as well as Native leaders who sought accommodation with the United States. In 1811, when Tecumseh was in the South recruiting allies, Americans under William Henry Harrison defeated Tenskwatawa at the Battle of Tippecanoe and destroyed Prophetstown.

In the War of 1812, Tecumseh joined his cause with the British, recruited warriors, and helped capture Detroit in August 1812. The following year he led an unsuccessful campaign against the United States in Ohio and Indiana. When U.S. naval forces took control of Lake Erie in 1813, Tecumseh reluctantly retreated with the British into Upper Canada. There, American troops led by Richard Mentor Johnson engaged them at the Battle of the Thames on October 5, 1813, during which Tecumseh was killed. His death caused his multi-tribal confederacy to collapse. The lands he had fought to defend were eventually ceded to the U.S. government. His legacy as one of the most celebrated Native Americans in history grew after his death, although details of his life have often been obscured by mythology.

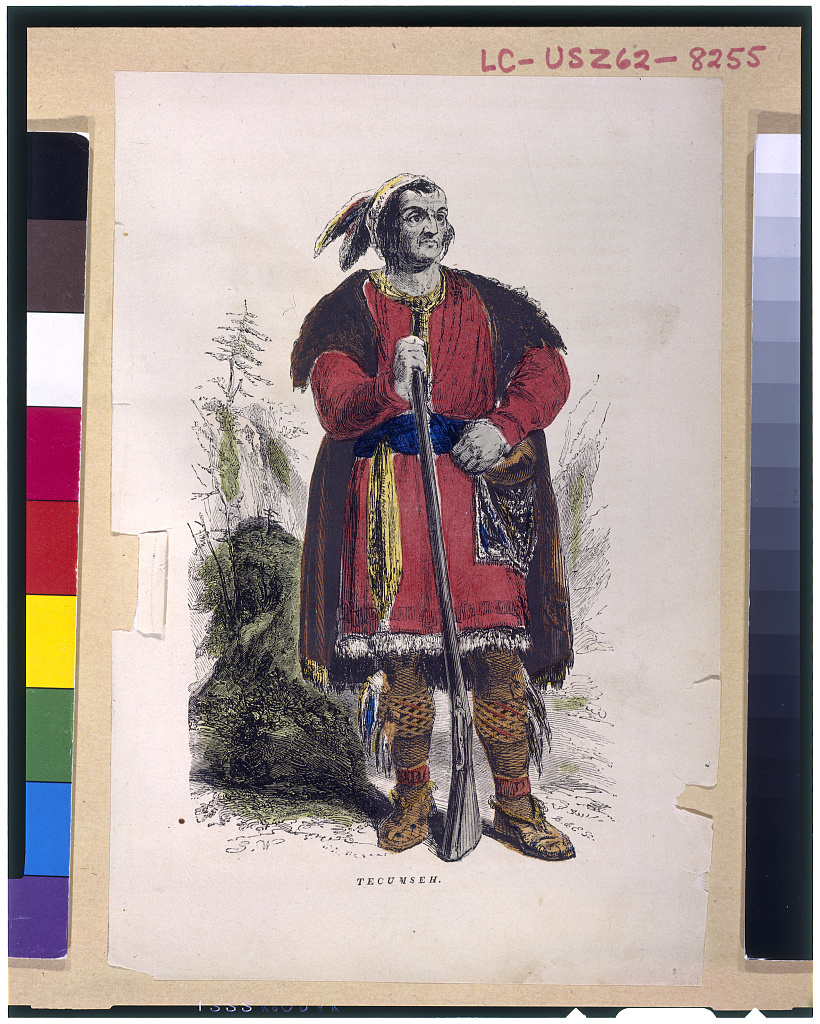
Full-length portrait of Tecumseh, 19th century

== Early life ==
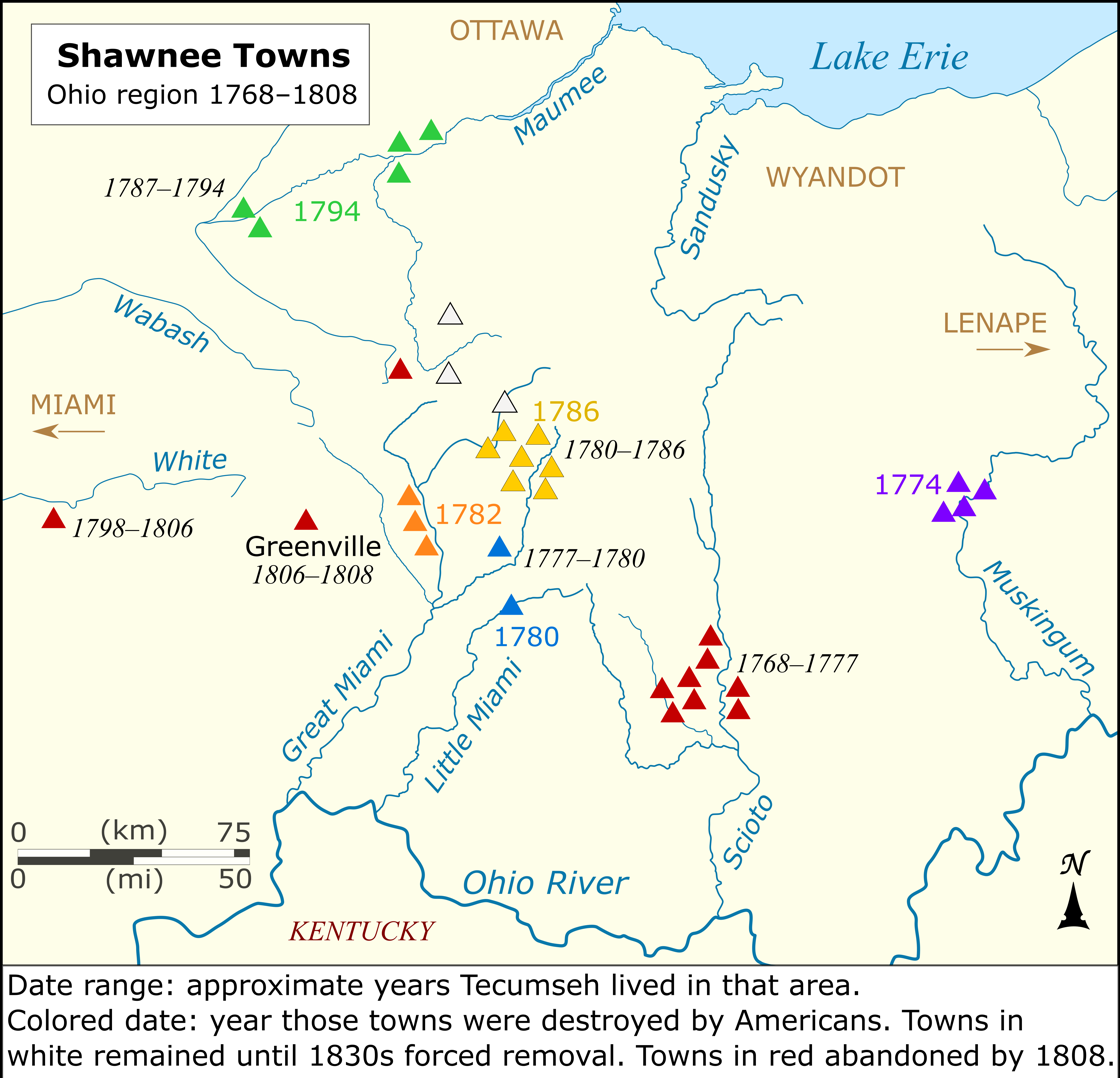
Map of Shawnee towns in the Ohio region from 1768 to 1808, indicating where Tecumseh lived

Tecumseh was born in Shawnee territory in what is now Ohio between 1764 and 1771. The best evidence suggests a birthdate of March 9, 1768. (Note: Tecumseh was not mentioned in contemporary historical documents for about the first 40 years of his life, so historians have reconstructed his early experiences based on later testimony. Interpretations vary in the dating of early events and the differentiation between legend and history. Tecumseh first appears in historical documents around 1808.)

The Shawnee pronunciation of his name has traditionally been rendered by non-Shawnee sources as "Tecumthé". (Note: No one knows how Tecumseh himself would have pronounced his name. There are no standard Roman-alphabet orthographies for rendering the Shawnee language, and among orthographies that have been used, none employ a "c" by itself or an "é". According to Sugden, Shawnees pronounce the s in Tecumseh as th, and noted that Tecumseh's Shawnee friend James Logan gave his full name as "We-the-cumpt-te". Gatschet (1895) gives the name in Shawnee as Tekámthi or Tkámthi, which is derived from níla ni tkamáthka, meaning "I cross the path or way (of an animate being)".) He was born into the Panther clan of the Kispoko division of the Shawnee tribe. Like most Shawnees, his name indicated his clan: translations of his name from the Shawnee language include "I Cross the Way", and "Shooting Star", references to a meteor associated with the Panther clan.

Later stories claimed that Tecumseh was named after a shooting star that appeared at his birth, although his father and most of his siblings, as members of the Panther clan, were named after the same meteor. (Note: In Tecumseh's time the Shawnee were organized into five tribal divisions or septs: Kispoko, Chalahgawtha (Chillicothe), Mekoche, Pekowi, and Hathawekela. Each Shawnee person also belonged to a clan (m'shoma), such as Panther, Turtle, and Turkey. Each clan had a peace chief (hokima) and war chief (neenawtooma). Each division often had a principal town named after the division. Clan leaders sat on a town council, which made important decisions by consensus. The town council sometimes appointed a clan leader to be the ceremonial hokima to speak for the town. When a clan hokima died, the town leaders selected his successor from among his sons. War chiefs were selected from successful war leaders. Shawnee chiefs had no coercive powers; they led by persuasion and example.)

Tecumseh was likely born in the Shawnee town of Chillicothe, in the Scioto River valley, near present-day Chillicothe, Ohio, or in a nearby Kispoko village. (Note: In 1777, many Shawnees moved away from the Scioto River to be less exposed to American attacks, establishing a new Chillicothe on the Little Miami River (present-day Oldtown, Ohio). In the early 20th century, people mistakenly identified this newer Chillicothe as Tecumseh's birthplace, unaware the town did not exist when Tecumseh was born. As a result, the official Ohio historical marker designating Tecumseh's birthplace is 50 miles (80 km) from the actual location.) Tecumseh's father, Puckeshinwau, was a Shawnee war chief of the Kispoko division. Tecumseh's mother, Methoataaskee, probably belonged to the Pekowi division and the Turtle clan, although some traditions maintain that she was Muscogee. His mother may have been a blood relative of William Weatherford. Tecumseh was the fifth of eight children. His parents met and married in what is now Alabama, where many Shawnees had settled after being driven out of the Ohio Country by the Iroquois in the 17th-century Beaver Wars. Around 1759, Puckeshinwau and Methoataaskee moved to the Ohio Country as part of a Shawnee effort to reunite in their traditional homeland.

In 1763, the British Empire laid claim to the Ohio Country following its victory in the French and Indian War. That year, Cheeseekau took part in Pontiac's War, a pan-tribal effort to counter British control of the region. Tecumseh was born in the peaceful decade after Pontiac's War, a time when Puckeshinwau likely became the chief of the Kispoko town on the Scioto. In a 1768 treaty, the Iroquois ceded land south of the Ohio River (including present-day Kentucky) to the British, a region the Shawnee and other tribes used for hunting. Shawnees attempted to organize further resistance against colonial occupation of the region, culminating in the 1774 Battle of Point Pleasant, in which Puckeshinwau was killed. After the battle, Shawnees ceded Kentucky to the colonists.

When the American Revolutionary War between the British and their American colonies began in 1775, many Shawnees allied themselves with the British, raiding into Kentucky with the aim of driving out American settlers. Tecumseh, too young to fight, was among those forced to relocate in the face of American counterraids. In 1777, his family moved from the Scioto River to a Kispoko town on the Mad River, near present-day Springfield, Ohio. General George Rogers Clark, commander of the Kentucky militia, led a major expedition into Shawnee territory in 1780. Tecumseh may have witnessed the ensuing Battle of Piqua on August 8. After the Shawnees retreated, Clark burned their villages and crops. The Shawnees relocated to the northwest, along the Great Miami River, but Clark returned in 1782 and destroyed those villages as well, forcing the Shawnees to retreat further north, near present-day Bellefontaine, Ohio.

== From warrior to chief ==
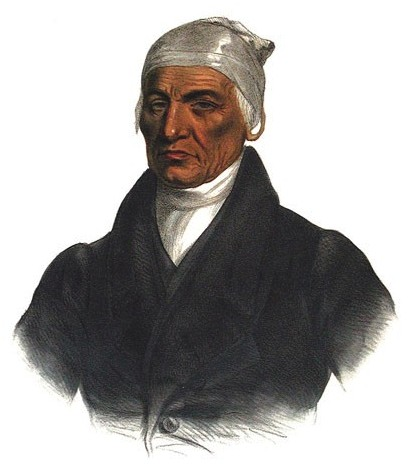
Black Hoof (Catecahassa) emerged in the 1790s as the principal spokesman for the Ohio Shawnees. Most Shawnees followed his lead rather than Tecumseh's.

After the American Revolutionary War ended in 1783, the United States claimed the lands north of the Ohio River by right of conquest; Britain had renounced its claims to the area in the Treaty of Paris. In response, Indians convened a great intertribal conference at Lower Sandusky in the summer of 1783. Speakers, most notably Joseph Brant of the Mohawk, argued that Indians must unite to hold onto their lands. They put forth a doctrine that Indian lands were held in common by all tribes, and so no further land should be ceded to the United States without the consent of all the tribes. This idea made a strong impression on Tecumseh, who was just fifteen years old when he attended the conference. As an adult, he would become such a well-known advocate of this policy that some mistakenly thought it had originated with him. The United States, however, insisted on dealing with the tribes individually, getting each to sign separate land treaties. In January 1786, Moluntha, civil chief of the Mekoche Shawnee division, signed the Treaty of Fort Finney, surrendering most of Ohio to the Americans. Later that year, Moluntha was murdered by a Kentucky militiaman, initiating a new border war.

Tecumseh, now about eighteen years old, became a warrior under the tutelage of his older brother Cheeseekau, who emerged as a noted war chief. Tecumseh participated in attacks on flatboats traveling down the Ohio River, carrying waves of immigrants into lands the Shawnees had lost. He was disturbed by the sight of prisoners being cruelly treated by the Shawnees, an early indication of his lifelong aversion to torture and cruelty, for which he would later be celebrated. In 1788, Tecumseh, Cheeseekau and their family moved westward, relocating near Cape Girardeau, Missouri. They hoped to be free of American settlers, only to find colonists moving there as well, so they did not stay long.

In late 1789 or early 1790, Tecumseh traveled south with Cheeseekau to live with the Chickamauga Cherokees near Lookout Mountain in what is now Tennessee. Some Shawnees already lived among the Chickamaugas, who were fierce opponents of U.S. expansion. Cheeseekau led about forty Shawnees in raids against colonists; Historical records indicate that Tecumseh and his brother, Cheeseekau, also known as Shawnee Warrior, lived with the Chickamaugans and participated in multitribal attacks on white settlements with them from 1790 to 1792. According to Tecumseh's boyhood companion Stephen Ruddell—captured with his brother Abraham in Kentucky in 1780 and raised among the Shawnees—Tecumseh never had more than one wife at a time. His longest relationship was with a Cherokee woman. They had a daughter who remained with her mother and was living in Arkansas in 1825.

The following century Tecumseh was said to be the grandfather of four or five brave and intelligent Cherokees known as the "'fair-skinned' Proctors".

In 1791, Tecumseh returned with eight warriors, including his younger brother Lalawéthika (later known as Tenskwatawa), to the Ohio Country to take part in the Northwest Indian War as a minor leader. The Native confederacy that had been formed to fight the war was led by the Shawnee Blue Jacket, and would provide a model for the confederacy Tecumseh created years later. Tecumseh missed fighting in a major Indian victory (St. Clair's defeat) on November 4 because he was hunting or scouting at the time. The following year he participated in other skirmishes before rejoining Cheeseekau in Tennessee. Tecumseh was with Cheeseekau when he was killed in an unsuccessful attack on Buchanan's Station near Nashville in 1792. Tecumseh probably sought revenge for his brother's death, but the details are unknown. During this time, he was somewhat known as "an eloquent speaker" among Native Americans, and this reputation would follow him for the rest of his life as he grew in prominence.

Tecumseh returned to the Ohio Country at the end of 1792 and fought in several more skirmishes. In 1794, he fought in the Battle of Fallen Timbers, a bitter defeat for the Indians. The Native confederacy fell apart, especially after Blue Jacket agreed to make peace with the Americans. Tecumseh did not attend the signing of the Treaty of Greenville (1795), in which about two-thirds of Ohio and portions of present-day Indiana were ceded to the United States.

By 1796, Tecumseh was both the civil and war chief of a Kispoko band of about 50 warriors and 250 people. His sister Tecumapease was the band's principal female chief. Tecumseh took a wife, Mamate, and had a son, Paukeesaa, born about 1796. Their marriage did not last, and Tecumapease raised Paukeesaa from the age of seven or eight. Tecumseh's band moved to various locations before settling in 1798 close to Delaware Indians, along the White River near present-day Anderson, Indiana, where he lived for the next eight years. He married twice more during this time. His third marriage, to White Wing, lasted until 1807.

== Rise of the Prophet ==
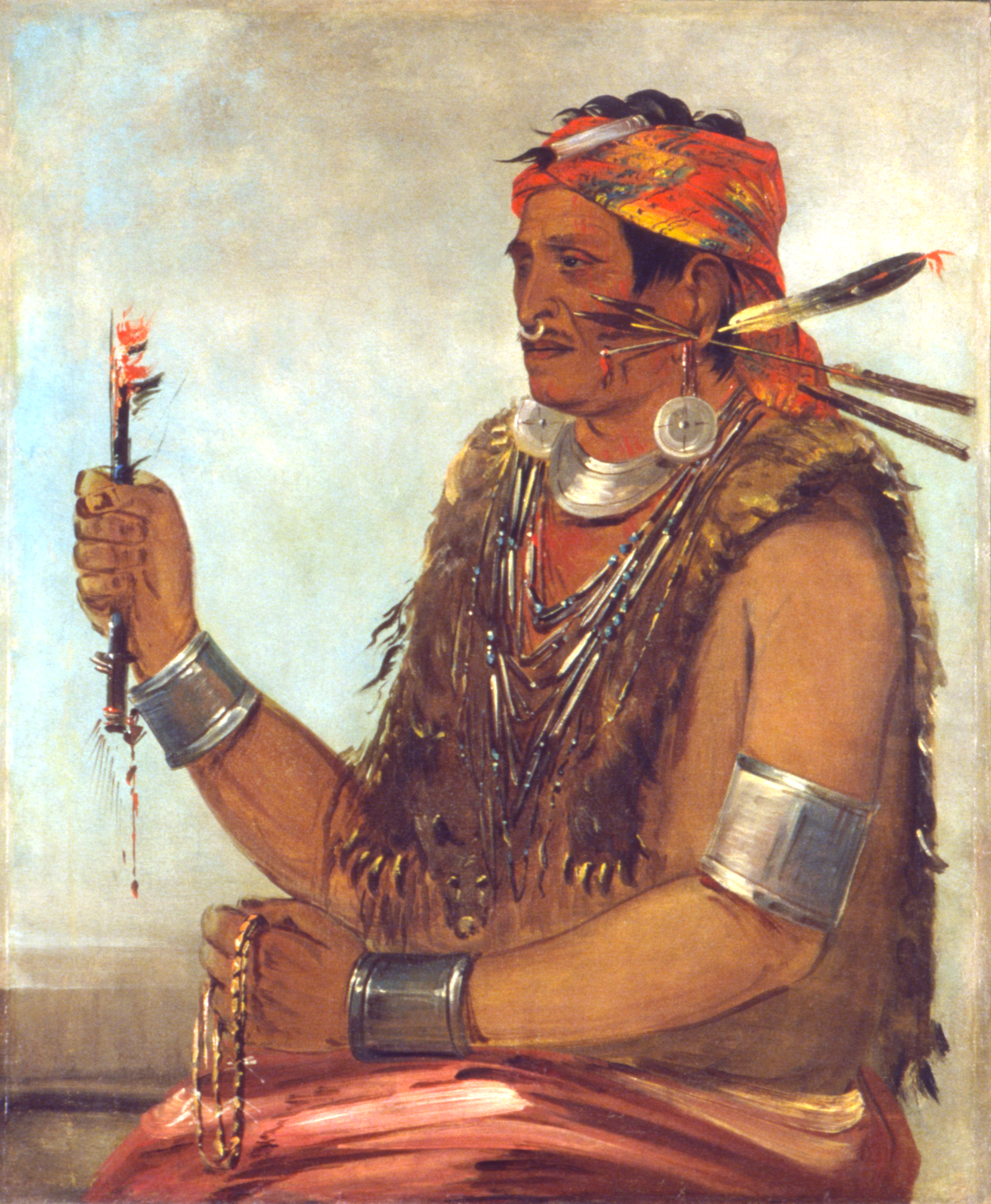
Tenskwatawa, Tecumseh's younger brother, founded a religious movement in 1805. (George Catlin, 1832)

While Tecumseh lived along the White River, Native Americans in the region were troubled by sickness, alcoholism, poverty, the loss of land, depopulation, and the decline of their traditional way of life. Several religious prophets emerged, each offering explanations and remedies for the crisis. Among these was Tecumseh's younger brother Lalawéthika, a healer in Tecumseh's village. Until this time, Lalawéthika had been regarded as a misfit with little promise. In 1805, he began preaching, drawing upon ideas espoused by earlier prophets, particularly the Delaware prophet Neolin. Lalawéthika urged listeners to reject European influences, stop drinking alcohol, and discard their traditional medicine bags. Tecumseh followed his brother's teachings by eating only Native food, wearing traditional Shawnee clothing, and not drinking alcohol.

Native leaders like Tecumseh interpreted European cultural ways as a danger and the encroachment of whites by examining the long history of Indigenous dispossession in the East; Tecumseh specifically warned his people that what had happened to the other Indigenous tribes would soon befall the peoples of the Old Northwest. Presaging his people's possible future, Tecumseh bluntly asked, "Where today are the Pequots? Where are the Narragansetts, the Mohawks, the Pocanets and many other once powerful tribes of our people? They have vanished before the avarice and oppression of the white man..."

In 1806, Tecumseh and Lalawéthika, now known as the Shawnee Prophet, established a new town near the ruins of Fort Greenville (present-day Greenville, Ohio), where the 1795 Treaty of Greenville had been signed. The Prophet's message spread widely, attracting visitors and converts from multiple tribes. The brothers hoped to reunite the scattered Shawnees at Greenville, but they were opposed by Black Hoof, a Mekoche chief regarded by Americans as the "principal chief" of the Shawnees. (Note: In Tecumseh's era, Shawnees lived in autonomous villages with no central government, but in the 1760s they began appointing a ceremonial leader from the Mekoche division to speak for them in negotiations with Europeans and Americans, who often mistook this leader as the Shawnee "principal chief" or "king". The ceremonial leader in Tecumseh's youth was Kisinoutha (Hard Man), who was succeeded in the 1780s by Moluntha and then Black Hoof.) Black Hoof and other leaders around the Shawnee town of Wapakoneta urged Shawnees to accommodate the United States by adopting some American customs, with the goal of creating a Shawnee homeland with secure borders in northern Ohio. The Prophet's movement represented a challenge to the Shawnee chiefs who sat on the tribal council at Wapakoneta. Most Ohio Shawnees followed Black Hoof's path and rejected the Prophet's movement. Important converts who joined the movement at Greenville were Blue Jacket, the famed Shawnee war leader, and Roundhead, who became Tecumseh's close friend and ally.

American settlers grew uneasy as Indians flocked to Greenville. In 1806 and 1807, Tecumseh and Blue Jacket traveled to Chillicothe, the capital of the new U.S. state of Ohio, to reassure the governor that Greenville posed no threat. Rumors of war between the United States and Great Britain followed the Chesapeake incident of June 1807. To escape the rising tensions, Tecumseh and the Prophet decided to move west to a more secure location, farther from American forts and closer to potential western Indian allies.

In 1808, Tecumseh and the Prophet established a village Americans would call Prophetstown, north of present-day Lafayette, Indiana. The Prophet adopted a new name, Tenskwatawa ("The Open Door"), meaning he was the door through which followers could reach salvation. Like Greenville, Prophetstown attracted numerous followers, comprising Shawnees, Potawatomis, Kickapoos, Winnebagos, Sauks, Ottawas, Wyandots, and Iowas, an unprecedented variety of Natives living together. Perhaps 6,000 people settled in the area, making it larger than any American city in the region. Jortner (2011) argues that Prophetstown was effectively an independent city-state.

At Prophetstown, Tecumseh and Tenskwatawa initially worked to maintain a peaceful coexistence with the United States. A major turning point came in September 1809, when William Henry Harrison, governor of the Indiana Territory, negotiated the Treaty of Fort Wayne, purchasing 2.5 to 3 million acres (10,000 to 12,000 km^{2}) of land in what is present-day Indiana and Illinois. Although many Indian leaders signed the treaty, others who used the land were deliberately excluded from the negotiations. The treaty created widespread outrage among Indians, and, according to historian John Sugden, "put Tecumseh on the road to war" with the United States.

== Forming a confederacy ==
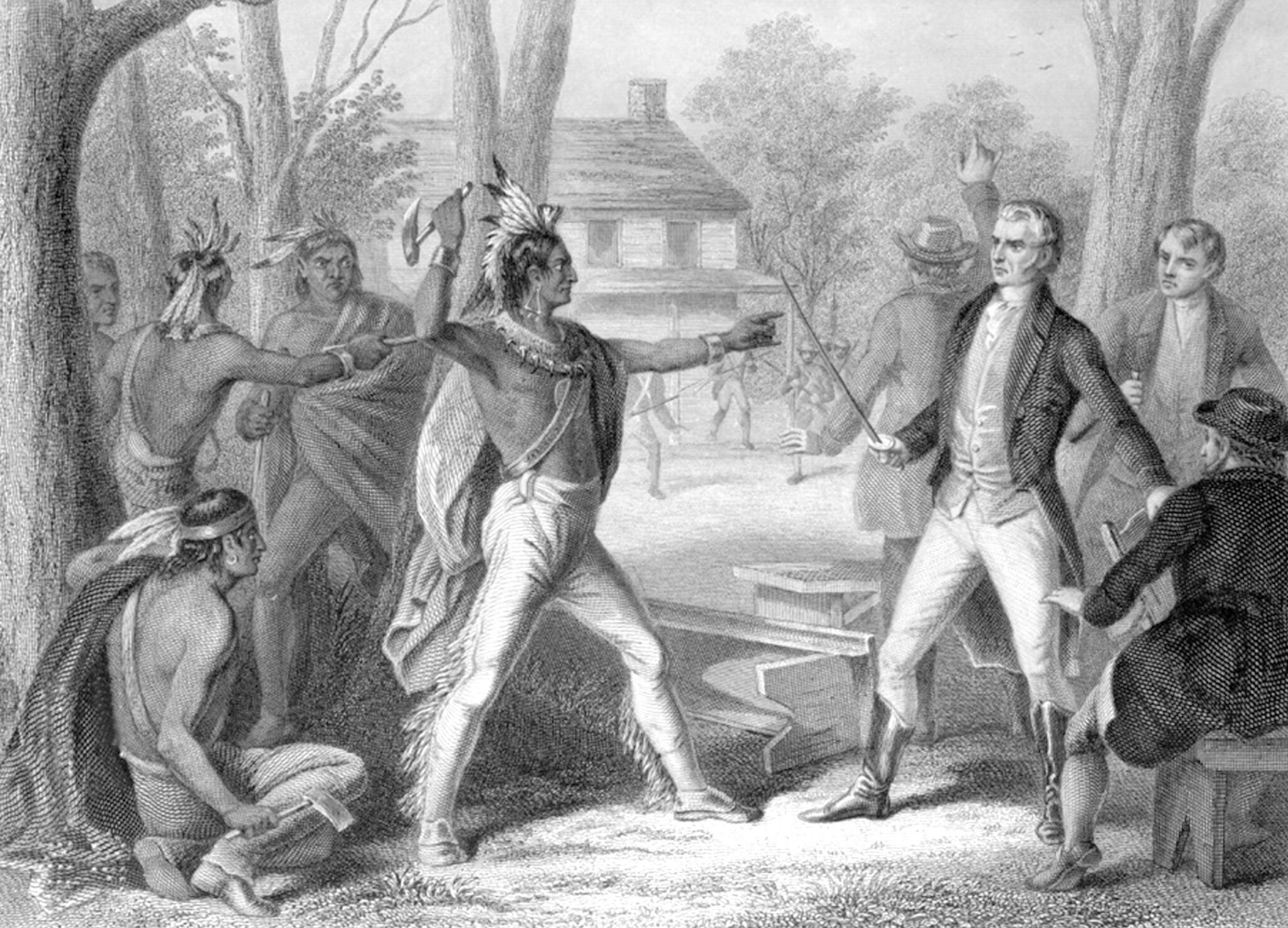
In a famous 1810 meeting, Tecumseh accosts William Henry Harrison when he refuses to rescind the Treaty of Fort Wayne.

Before the Treaty of Fort Wayne, Tecumseh was relatively unknown to outsiders, who usually referred to him as "the Prophet's brother". Afterwards he emerged as a prominent figure and attempted to build an intertribal confederacy—consisting of united Indians from the Great Lakes to the Gulf of Mexico—to counter U.S. expansion. Tecumseh envisioned a permanent Native nation with clear borders, living alongside (but separate from) the United States. He was convinced that a show of unity and cultural strength among the Native tribes would persuade white Americans to accept this arrangement, but it soon became obvious that Anglo‑America had no intention of embracing such a drastic shift.

In August 1810, Tecumseh met with William Henry Harrison at Vincennes, capital of the Indiana Territory, which resulted in a standoff that became legendary. At Vincennes, Tecumseh presented Harrison with what historian Jeffrey Ostler describes as a pointed indictment rather than a diplomatic protest. He cited recent and earlier episodes of violence against Native communities, including the Gnadenhütten massacre and the killing of the Shawnee peace chief Moluntha, who had been holding an American-issued flag of protection when he was murdered. Tecumseh framed these events as part of a longstanding pattern of deceit by American authorities. His most serious allegation was that goods distributed to the Kickapoos under Harrison's authority had carried smallpox, causing many deaths—an accusation Ostler interprets as charging the United States with intentional, systematic destruction of Native peoples. Tecumseh's claims reflected a broader Indigenous understanding, documented over decades, that U.S. actions amounted to deliberate extermination, including through the spread of disease.

To this end, Tecumseh demanded that Harrison rescind the terms of the Fort Wayne Treaty, and said he would oppose American settlement on the disputed lands. He said the chiefs who had signed the treaty would be punished, and that he was uniting the tribes to prevent further cessions. Harrison insisted the land had been purchased fairly and that Tecumseh had no right to object because Native Americans did not own land in common. Harrison said he would send Tecumseh's demands to President James Madison, but did not expect the president to accept them. As the meeting concluded, Tecumseh said that if Madison did not rescind the Fort Wayne treaty, "You and I will have to fight it out."

After the confrontation with Harrison, Tecumseh traveled widely to build his confederacy. He went westward to recruit allies among the Potawatomi, Winnebago, Sauk, Meskwaki, Kickapoo, and Missouri Shawnees. In November 1810, he visited Fort Malden in Upper Canada to ask British officials for assistance in the coming war, but the British were noncommittal, urging restraint. In May 1811, Tecumseh visited Ohio to recruit warriors among the Shawnees, Wyandots, and Senecas. After returning to Prophetstown, he sent a delegation to the Iroquois in New York.

In July 1811, Tecumseh again met Harrison at Vincennes. He told the governor he had amassed a confederacy of northern tribes and was heading south to do the same. For the next six months, Tecumseh traveled some 3,000 miles (4,800 km) in the south and west to recruit allies. The documentary evidence of this journey is fragmentary, and was exaggerated in folklore, but he probably met with Chickasaws, Choctaws, Muscogee, Osages, western Shawnees and Delawares, Iowas, Sauks, Meskwaki, Sioux, Kickapoos, and Potawatomis. He was aided in his efforts by two extraordinary events: the Great Comet of 1811 and the New Madrid earthquake, which he and other Native Americans interpreted as omens that his confederacy should be supported. Many rejected his overtures, especially in the south, most notably the Choctaws and Chickasaws; his most receptive southern listeners were among the Muscogee. A faction among the Muscogee, who became known as the Red Sticks, responded to Tecumseh's call to arms, contributing to the coming of the Creek War.

According to Sugden, Tecumseh had made a "serious mistake" by informing Harrison he would be absent from Prophetstown for an extended time. Harrison wrote that Tecumseh's absence "affords a most favorable opportunity for breaking up his Confederacy". In September 1811, Harrison marched toward Prophetstown with about 1,000 men. In the pre-dawn hours on November 7, warriors from Prophetstown launched a surprise attack on Harrison's camp, initiating the Battle of Tippecanoe. Harrison's men held their ground, after which the Prophet's warriors withdrew and evacuated Prophetstown. The Americans burned the village the following day and returned to Vincennes.

Historians have traditionally viewed the Battle of Tippecanoe as a devastating blow to Tecumseh's confederacy. According to a story recorded by Benjamin Drake ten years after the battle, Tecumseh was furious with Tenskwatawa after the battle and threatened to kill him. Afterwards, it was said, the Prophet played little part in the confederacy's leadership. Modern scholarship has cast doubt on this interpretation. Historians Gregory Dowd, Alfred Cave, and Adam Jortner all contend that stories of Tenskwatawa's disgrace originated with Harrison's allies and are not supported by other sources. According to this view, the battle was a setback for Tenskwatawa, but he continued to serve as the confederacy's spiritual leader, with Tecumseh as its diplomat and military leader.

Harrison hoped his preemptive strike would subdue Tecumseh's confederacy, but a wave of frontier violence erupted after the battle. Native Americans, many who had fought at Tippecanoe, sought revenge and killed as many as 46 Americans. Tecumseh sought to restrain warriors from premature action while preparing the confederacy for future hostilities. By the time the United States declared war on Great Britain in June 1812, as many as 800 warriors had gathered around the rebuilt Prophetstown. Tecumseh's Native American allies throughout the Northwest Territory numbered around 3,500 warriors.

== War of 1812 ==
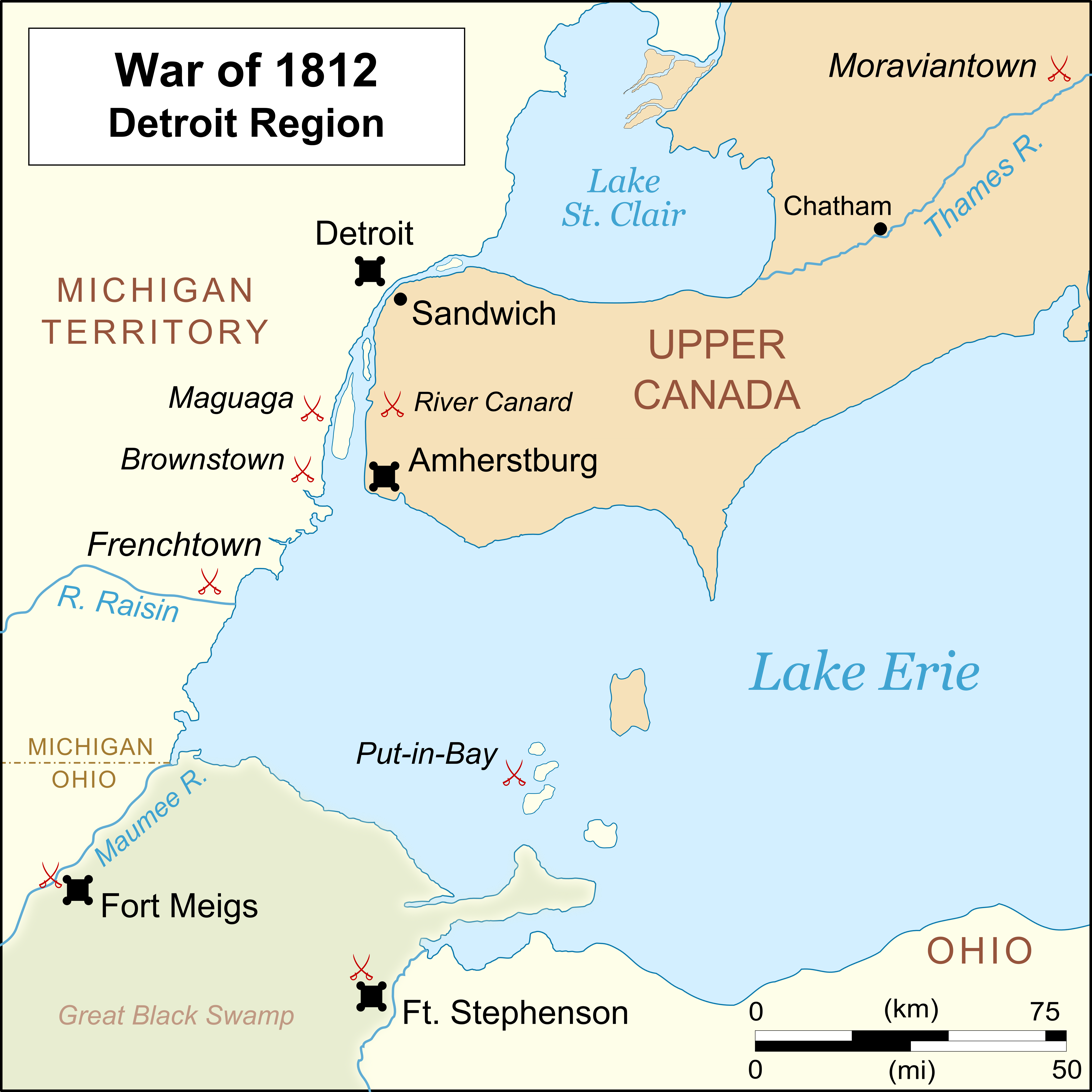
Forts and battles in the Detroit region

Tecumseh's brief partnership with Isaac Brock is celebrated in Canadian history. (Meeting of Brock and Tecumseh, Charles William Jefferys, 1915)

In June 1812, Tecumseh arrived at Fort Malden in Amherstburg to join his cause with the British in the War of 1812. He recognized the new war between Britain and the United States as a prime opportunity for the Native nations to seize, telling an assemblage of Native leaders, "Here is a chance...such as will never occur again—for us Indians of North America to form ourselves into one great combination." Because the British had few troops and scant resources in the west, Native allies were essential to their defense of Upper Canada. The British quickly recognized Tecumseh as the most influential of their Indian allies and relied upon him to direct the Native forces. He and his warriors scouted and probed enemy positions as American General William Hull crossed into Canada and threatened to take Fort Malden. On July 25, Tecumseh's warriors skirmished with Americans north of Amherstburg, inflicting the first American fatalities of the war.

Tecumseh turned his attention to cutting off Hull's supply and communication lines on the U.S. side of the border, south of Detroit. On August 5, he led 25 warriors in two successive ambushes, scattering a far superior force. Tecumseh captured Hull's outgoing mail, which revealed that the general was fearful of being cut off. On August 9, Tecumseh joined with British soldiers at the Battle of Maguaga, successfully thwarting Hull's attempt to reopen his line of communications. Two days later, Hull pulled the last of his men from Amherstburg, ending his attempt to invade Canada.

=== Brock and the Siege of Detroit ===
On August 14, Major-General Isaac Brock, British commander of Upper Canada, arrived at Fort Malden and began preparations for attacking Hull at Fort Detroit. Tecumseh, upon hearing of Brock's plans, reportedly turned to his companions and said, "This is a man!" (Note: This oft-quoted comment was reported by a member of Brock's regiment who was not present; Sugden writes, "perhaps it happened".) Tecumseh and Brock "formed an immediate friendship that served to cement the alliance". Brock's high esteem for Tecumseh likely contributed to a popular belief that Tecumseh was appointed a brigadier general in the British Army, though this is a myth.

Tecumseh led about 530 warriors in the Siege of Detroit. According to one account, Tecumseh had his men repeatedly pass through an opening in the woods to create the impression that thousands of Native Americans were outside the fort, a story that may be apocryphal. (Note: This incident was reported by a Canadian militia officer who was not an eyewitness; American accounts of the battle do not mention it.) To almost everyone's astonishment, Hull decided to surrender on August 16. Historian Pekka Hämäläinen considers Tecumseh's success during the Battle of Fort Detroit as one of the tribal leader's "finest moments" for having tricked Hull into surrendering without giving battle.

The British commander Brock wrote of Tecumseh:

He who attracted most of my attention was a Shawnee chief, Tecumset [sic], brother to the Prophet, who for the last two years has carried on, contrary to our remonstrances, an active warfare against the United States. A more sagacious or a more gallant warrior does not I believe exist. He was the admiration of every one who conversed with him.

Brock likely assured Tecumseh that the British would support Native American land claims. He wrote his superiors that restoration of land "fraudulently usurped" from the Native Americans should be considered in any peace treaty. News of Detroit's capture revived British discussion of creating of an Indian barrier state to ensure the security of Upper Canada. After his short stay in the area, Brock returned to the Niagara frontier, where he was killed in action several weeks later. Meanwhile, the British had negotiated a temporary armistice and called off further offensives. Tecumseh was frustrated by the unexpected British-American armistice, which came at a time when his confederacy was attacking other American forts and needed British support. In September 1812, he and Roundhead led 600 warriors to assist in an attack on Fort Wayne, but the siege failed before they arrived. Another siege against Fort Harrison also failed. Tecumseh stayed in the Prophetstown region for the remainder of 1812, coordinating Native American war efforts.

=== Fort Meigs ===
I have with me eight hundred braves. You have an equal number in your hiding place. Come out with them and give me battle; you talked like a brave when we met at Vincennes, and I respected you; but now you hide behind logs and in the earth like a ground hog. Give me your answer.

— Tecumseh's message to William Henry Harrison at Fort Meigs

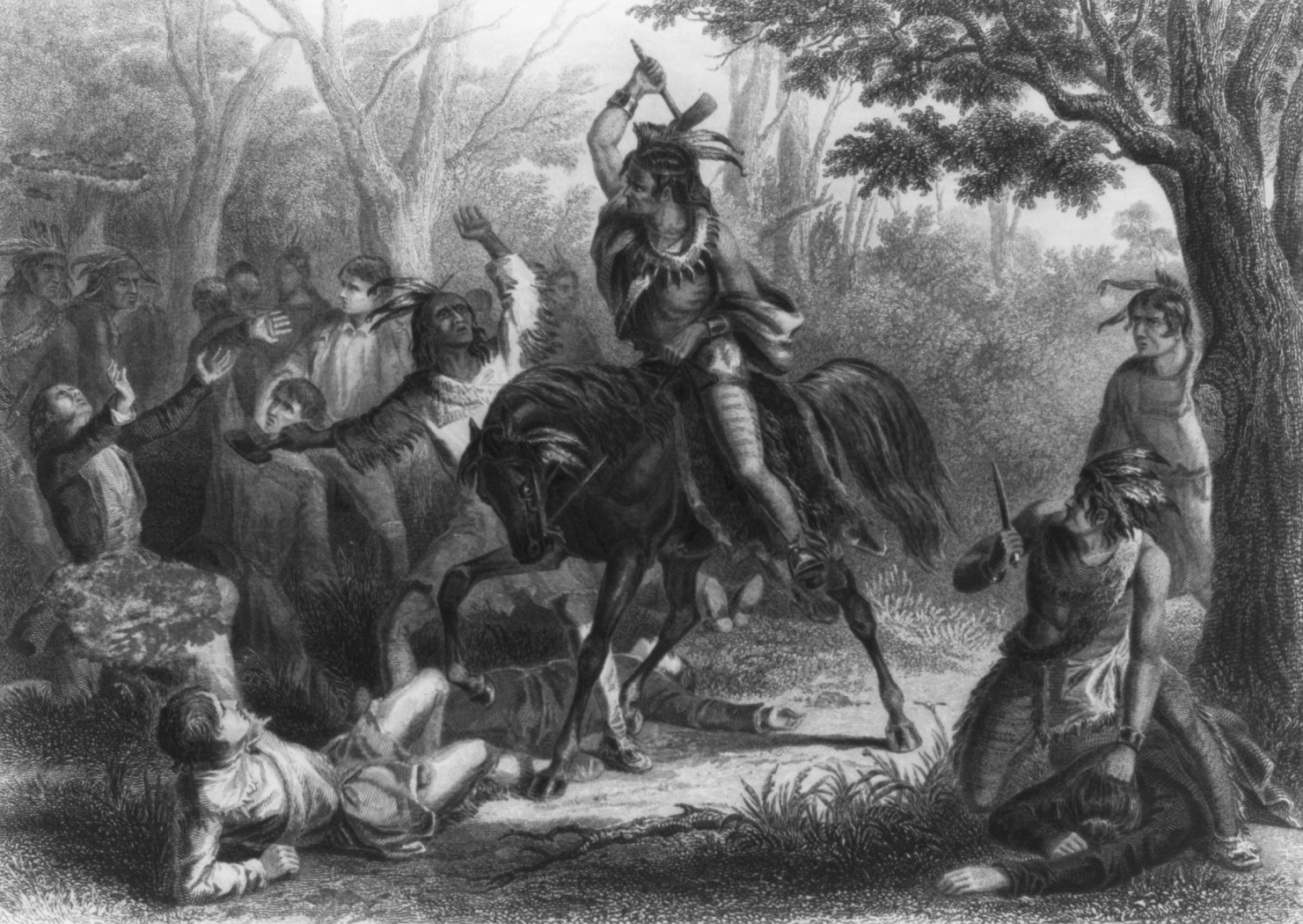
Tecumseh (in white, arm upraised) stopping the killing of American prisoners near Fort Meigs (John Emmins, 1860)

Tecumseh returned to Amherstburg in April 1813. Meanwhile, the Americans, having suffered defeat at the Battle of Frenchtown in January 1813, were pushing back toward Detroit under the command of William Henry Harrison. Tecumseh and Roundhead led about 1,200 warriors to Fort Meigs, a recently constructed American fort along the Maumee River in Ohio. The Indians initially saw little action while British forces under General Henry Procter laid siege to the fort. Fighting outside the fort began on May 5 after the arrival of American reinforcements, who attacked the British gun batteries. Tecumseh led an attack on an American sortie from the fort, then crossed the river to help defeat a regiment of Kentucky militia. The British and Native Americans had inflicted heavy casualties on the Americans outside the fort, but failed to capture it. Procter's Canadian militia and many of Tecumseh's warriors left after the battle, so Procter was compelled to lift the siege.

One of the most famous incidents in Tecumseh's life occurred after the battle. American prisoners had been taken to the nearby ruins of Fort Miami. When a group of Indians began killing prisoners, Tecumseh rushed in and stopped the slaughter. According to Sugden (1997), "Tecumseh's defense of the American prisoners became a cornerstone of his legend, the ultimate proof of his inherent nobility." Some accounts said Tecumseh rebuked General Procter for failing to protect the prisoners, though this might not have happened.

Tecumseh and Procter returned to Fort Meigs in July 1813, Tecumseh with 2,500 warriors, the largest contingent he would ever lead. They had little hope of taking the strongly defended fort, but Tecumseh sought to draw the Americans into open battle. He staged a mock battle within earshot of the fort, hoping the Americans would ride out to assist. The ruse failed and the second siege of Fort Meigs was lifted. Procter then led a detachment to attack Fort Stephenson on the Sandusky River, while Tecumseh went west to intercept potential American advances. Procter's attack failed and the expedition returned to Amherstburg.

=== Death and aftermath ===
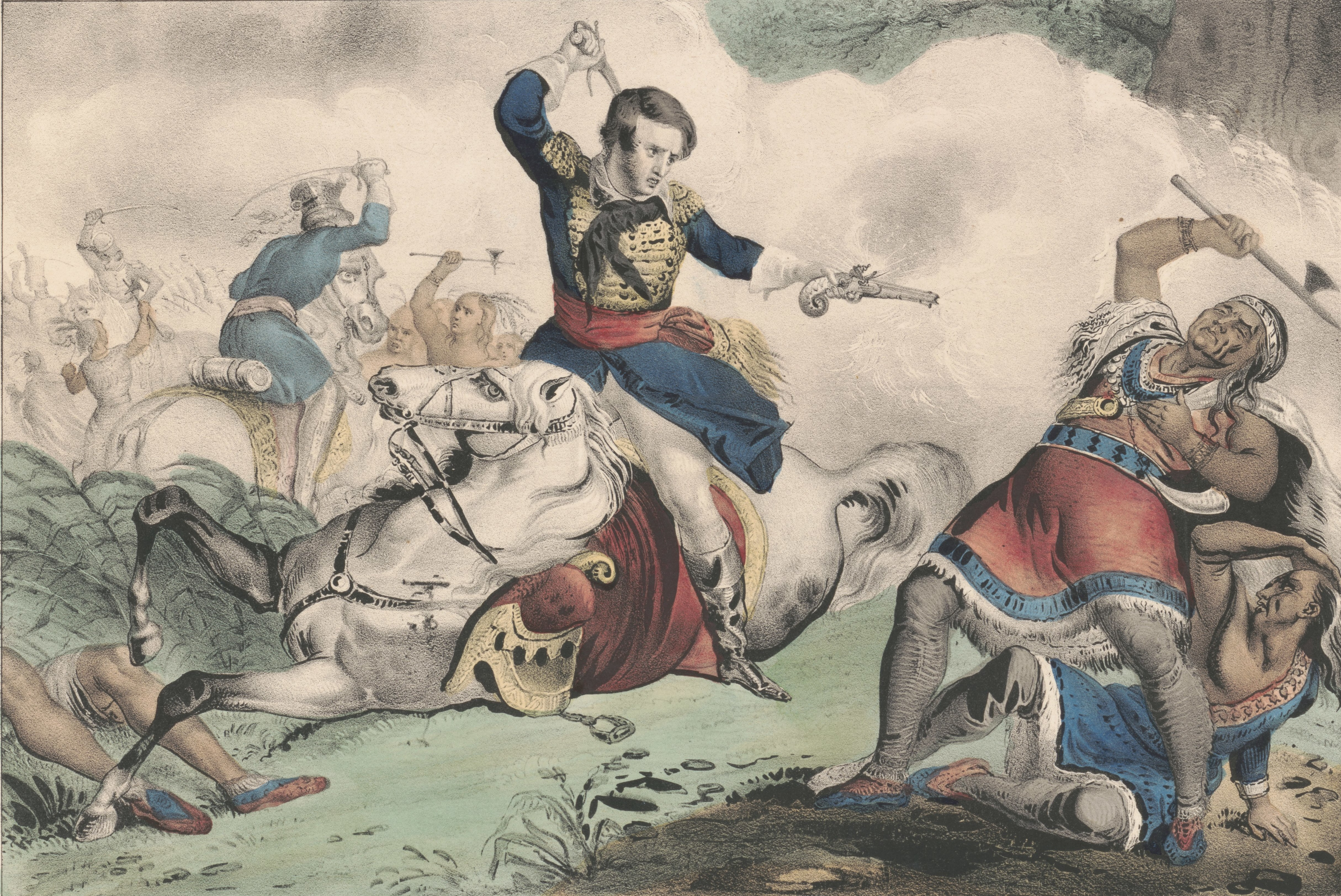
Nathaniel Currier's lithograph (c. 1846) is one of many images that portrayed Richard Mentor Johnson shooting Tecumseh.

Tecumseh hoped further offensives were forthcoming, but after the American naval victory in the Battle of Lake Erie on September 10, 1813, Procter decided to retreat from Amherstburg. Tecumseh pleaded with Procter to stay and fight: "Our lives are in the hands of the Great Spirit. We are determined to defend our lands, and if it is his will, we wish to leave our bones upon them." Procter insisted the defense of Amherstburg was untenable now that the Americans controlled Lake Erie, but he promised to make a stand at Chatham, along the Thames River. Tecumseh reluctantly agreed. The British burned Fort Malden and public buildings in Amherstburg, then began the retreat, with William Henry Harrison's army in pursuit.

Tecumseh arrived at Chatham to find that Procter had retreated even further upriver. Procter sent word that he had chosen to make a stand near Moraviantown. Tecumseh was angered by the change in plans, but he led a rearguard action at Chatham to slow the American advance, and was slightly wounded in the arm. Many of Tecumseh's despairing allies deserted during the retreat, leaving him 500 warriors. Procter and Tecumseh, outnumbered more than three-to-one, faced the Americans at the Battle of the Thames on October 5. Tecumseh positioned his men in a line of trees along the right, hoping to flank the Americans. The left, commanded by Procter, collapsed almost immediately, and Procter fled the battlefield. Colonel Richard Mentor Johnson led the American charge against the Indians. Tecumseh was killed in the fierce fighting, and the Indians dispersed. The Americans had won a decisive victory.

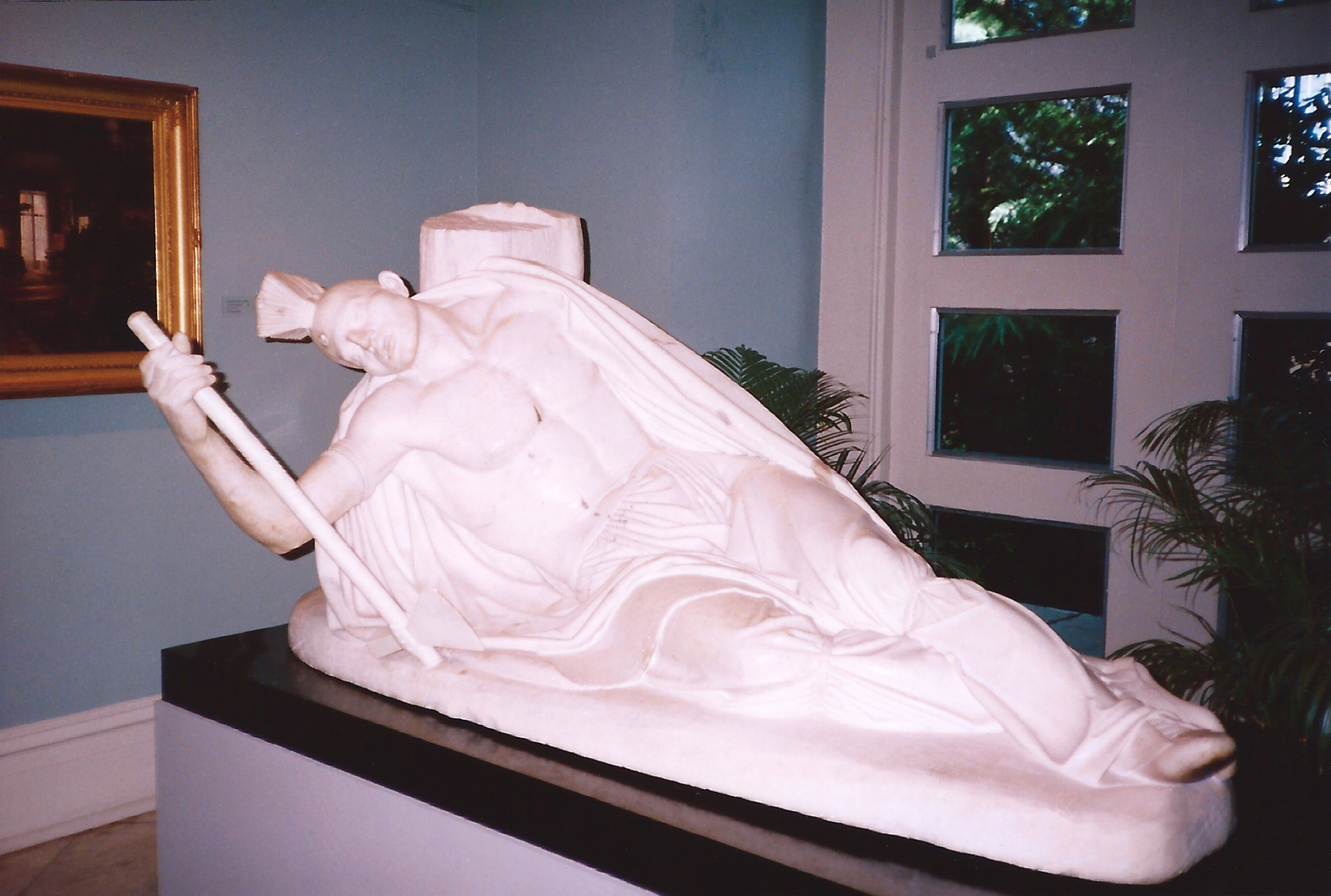
The Dying Tecumseh, sculpture by Ferdinand Pettrich; marble, 1856. Description: "Grand Chief of the Western Indians. Fell in the Battle of the Thames 1813"

After the battle, American soldiers stripped and scalped Tecumseh's body. The next day, when Tecumseh's body had been positively identified, others peeled off some skin as souvenirs. The location of his remains is unknown. The earliest account stated that his body had been taken by Canadians and buried at Sandwich. Later stories said he was buried at the battlefield, or that his body was secretly removed and buried elsewhere. According to another tradition, an Ojibwe named Oshahwahnoo, who had fought at Moraviantown, exhumed Tecumseh's body in the 1860s and buried him on St. Anne Island on the St. Clair River. In 1931, these bones were examined. Tecumseh had broken a thighbone in a riding accident as a youth and thereafter walked with a limp, but neither thigh of this skeleton had been broken. Nevertheless, in 1941 the remains were buried on nearby Walpole Island in a ceremony honoring Tecumseh. St-Denis (2005), in a book-length investigation of the topic, concluded that Tecumseh was likely buried on the battlefield and his remains have been lost.

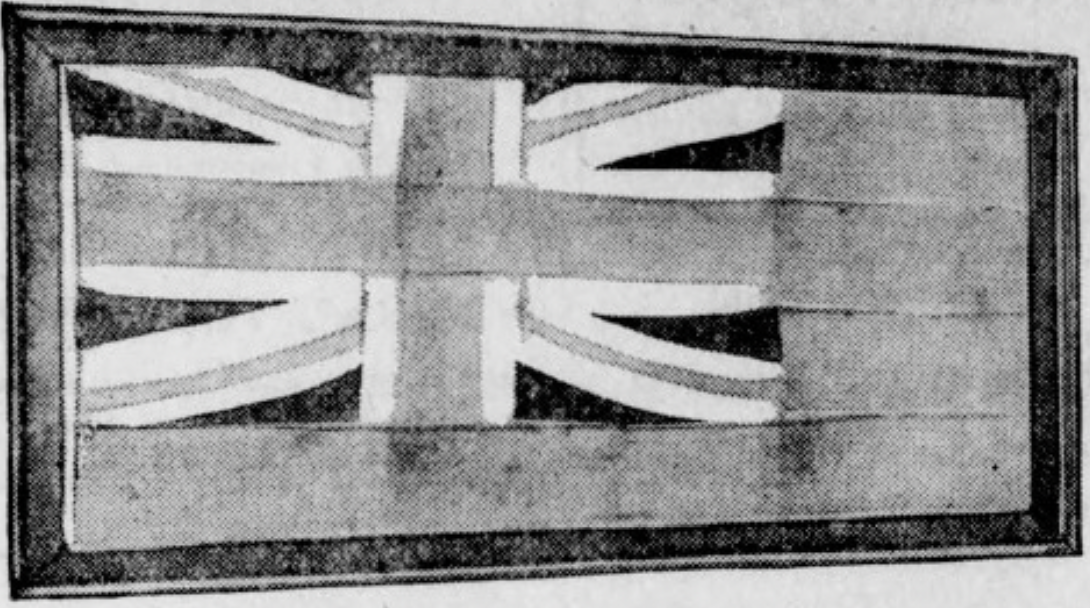
Flag draped over Tecumseh's body during his funeral

Initial published accounts identified Richard Mentor Johnson as having killed Tecumseh. In 1816, another account claimed a different soldier had fired the fatal shot. The matter became controversial in the 1830s when Johnson was a candidate for Vice President of the United States to Martin Van Buren. Johnson's supporters promoted him as Tecumseh's killer, employing slogans such as "Rumpsey dumpsey, rumpsey dumpsey, Colonel Johnson killed Tecumseh." Johnson's opponents collected testimony contradicting this claim; numerous other possibilities were named. Sugden (1985) presented the evidence and argued that Johnson's claim was the strongest, though not conclusive. Johnson became Vice President in 1837, his fame largely based on his claim to have killed Tecumseh.

Tecumseh's death led to the collapse of his confederacy; except in the southern Creek War, most of his followers did little more fighting. In the negotiations that ended the War of 1812, the British attempted to honor promises made to Tecumseh by insisting upon the creation of a Native American barrier state in the Old Northwest. The Americans refused and the matter was dropped. The Treaty of Ghent (1814) called for Native American lands to be restored to their 1811 boundaries, something the United States had no intention of doing. By the end of the 1830s, the U.S. government had compelled Shawnees still living in Ohio to sign removal treaties and move west of the Mississippi River.

=== Tecumseh's Cherokee descendants ===
In the 1800s Lyman C. Draper attempted to eke out information about possible Cherokee descendants of Tecumseh in the Cherokee Nation (brave and intelligent "fair-skinned" Proctors). He wrote to both Will P. Ross at Fort Gibson, and J. T. Adair of Oak Grove. Will P. Ross replied:

"I have not learned anything of the Cherokee woman, Tahneh [who was said to be the mother of a daughter by Tecumseh], beyond the fact that a person of that name resided in the neighborhood of Mrs. Looney."

Adair advised him to ask Ezekial "Zeke" Proctor for further information about his connection to Tecumseh. Draper did write to Ezekial Proctor, but there is no indication that Proctor ever answered him.

Missionary records indicate that Tahneh [said to be the mother of Tecumseh's daughter] was the full blood daughter of a major chief and warrior of Will's Valley. She migrated to the west in 1818. She was baptized on 5 September 1824 when she was about 64 years old and given the name Naomi. She lived near Mrs. Looney (daughter of Will Webber of Will's Valley and Tsa-luh, later known as Sarah Brown) in Arkansas and was a member of the church at Fairfield where Alexander Brown (stepbrother of Betsy Webber Looney) interpreted. One of Tahneh's daughters joined the Fairfield church.

While some of Tecumseh's alleged Proctor descendants remained in the Cherokee Nation, it appears that descendants of Elizabeth Victoria Shelton, granddaughter of Johnson Proctor who was murdered at the Goingsnake Courthouse in 1872 defending his brother, Ezekial "Zeke", made their way west and were living in California in the first half of the twentieth century.

== Legacy ==
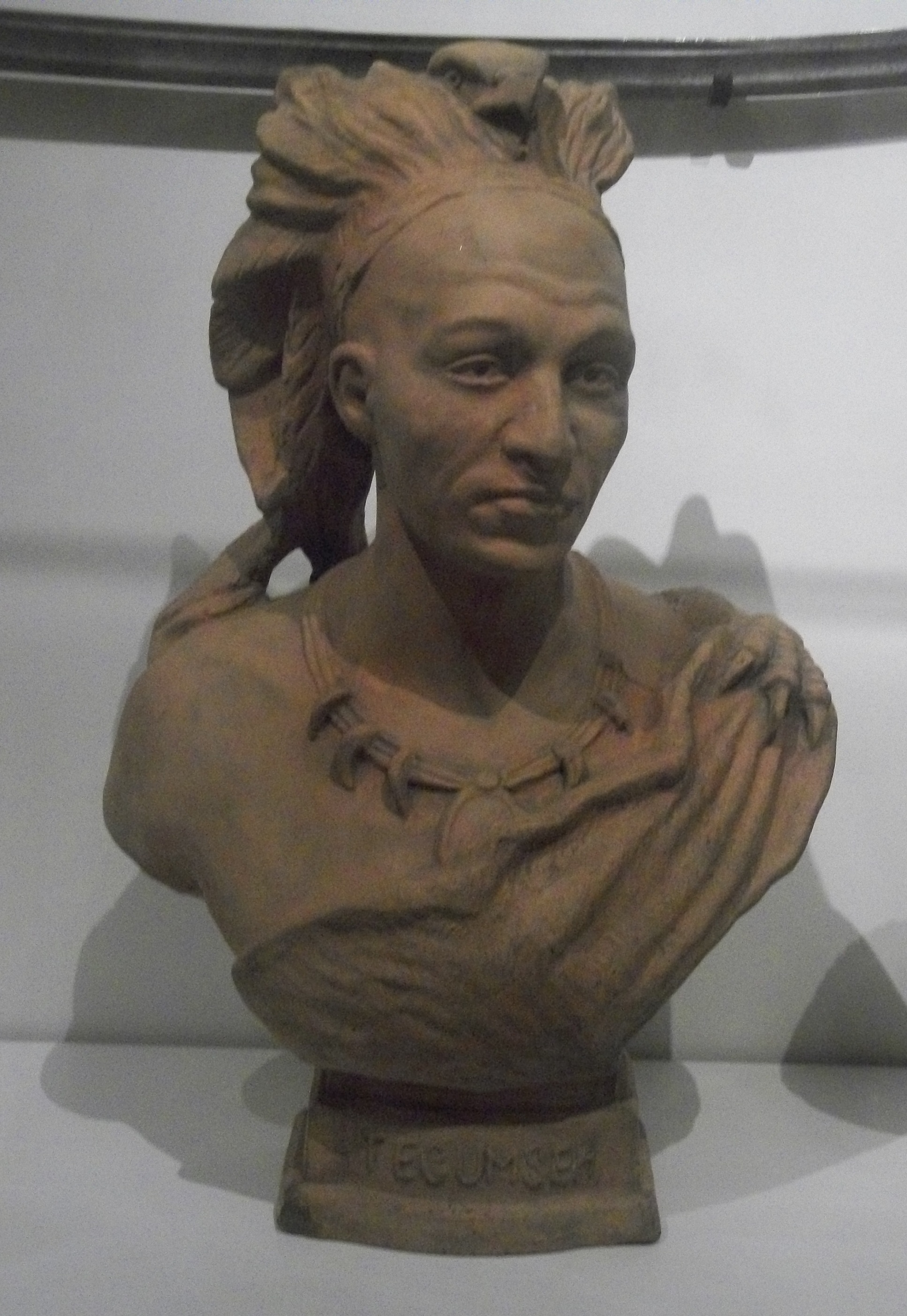
Tecumseh by Hamilton MacCarthy (c. 1896), Royal Ontario Museum, Toronto

Tecumseh was widely admired in his lifetime, even by Americans who had fought against him. His primary American foe, William Henry Harrison, described Tecumseh as "one of those uncommon geniuses, which spring up occasionally to produce revolutions and overturn the established order of things". After his death, he became a folk hero in American, Indigenous, and Canadian history. For many Native Americans in the United States and First Nations people in Canada, he became a hero who transcends tribal identity. Tecumseh's stature grew over the decades after his death, often at the expense of Tenskwatawa, whose religious views white writers found alien and unappealing. White writers tended to turn Tecumseh into a "secular" leader who only used his brother's religious movement for political reasons. For many Europeans and white North Americans, he became the foremost example of the "noble savage" stereotype.

Tecumseh is honored in Canada as a hero who played a major role in Canada's defense in the War of 1812, joining Sir Isaac Brock and Laura Secord as the best-remembered people of that war. John Richardson, an important early Canadian novelist, had served with Tecumseh and idolized him. His 1828 epic poem "Tecumseh; or, The Warrior of the West" was intended to "preserve the memory of one of the noblest and most gallant spirits" in history. Canadian writers such as Charles Mair (Tecumseh: A Drama, 1886) celebrated Tecumseh as a Canadian patriot, an idea reflected in numerous subsequent biographies written for Canadian school children. The portrayal of Tecumseh as a Canadian patriot has been criticized for obscuring his true aim of protecting Native homelands outside of Canada. Among the many things named for Tecumseh in Canada are the naval reserve unit HMCS Tecumseh and the towns of Tecumseh in Southwestern Ontario and New Tecumseth in Central Ontario. In 1931, the Canadian government designated Tecumseh as a person of national historic significance.

Tecumseh has long been admired in Germany, especially due to popular novels by Fritz Steuben, beginning with The Flying Arrow (1930). Steuben used Tecumseh to promote Nazism, though later editions of his novels removed the Nazi elements. An East German film, Tecumseh, was released in 1972.

During the late 1960s, Tecumseh's efforts to form a Pan-Native American confederacy were mirrored in some way by what became a nativist movement, coined by some as "New Indians", but whose bellicose rhetoric proved controversial across various tribal groups. Historians have often treated Tecumseh's effort to build a continent-wide confederacy as an early expression of pan-Indian politics. His insistence that Native nations act together across linguistic and regional lines has been described as a precursor to later twentieth-century movements for intertribal solidarity and political cooperation, including pan-Indian organizations and the so-called Red Power era. While most modern Native activists did not organize explicitly under Tecumseh's name, scholars argue that his vision of a unified Indigenous front against U.S. expansion anticipated many of the themes that would re-emerge in twentieth-century Native nationalism.

In the United States, Tecumseh became a legendary figure, the historical details of his life shrouded in mythology. According to Edmunds (2007), "the real Tecumseh has been overshadowed by a folk hero whose exploits combine the best of fact and fiction". Only in the late 20th century did academic historians begin to unravel fact from fiction. The fictional Tecumseh has been featured in poems, plays, and novels, movies, and outdoor dramas. Examples include George Jones's Tecumseh; or, The Prophet of the West (1844 play), Mary Catherine Crowley's Love Thrives in War (1903 novel), Brave Warrior (1952 film), and Allan W. Eckert's A Sorrow in Our Hearts: The Life of Tecumseh (1992 novel). James Alexander Thom's 1989 novel Panther in the Sky was made into a TV movie, Tecumseh: The Last Warrior (1995). The outdoor drama Tecumseh! has been performed near Chillicothe, Ohio, since 1973. Written by Allan Eckert, the story features a fictional, doomed romance between Tecumseh and a white settler woman, an example of the "vanishing Indian" scenario popular with white Americans. William Tecumseh Sherman, a Union general during the American Civil War, was also named after Tecumseh.

In 2024, the main-belt asteroid 47069 Tecumseh was named in his honor by the International Astronomical Union (IAU). Also in 2024, Firaxis Games worked with chief Ben Barnes and other members of the Shawnee Tribe to create a historically accurate depiction of Tecumseh in the video game Civilization VII.

== See also ==
- Curse of Tippecanoe – Supposed pattern of U.S. presidential deaths
