= Yellow Hawk =

Leader of the Sans Arc Lakota

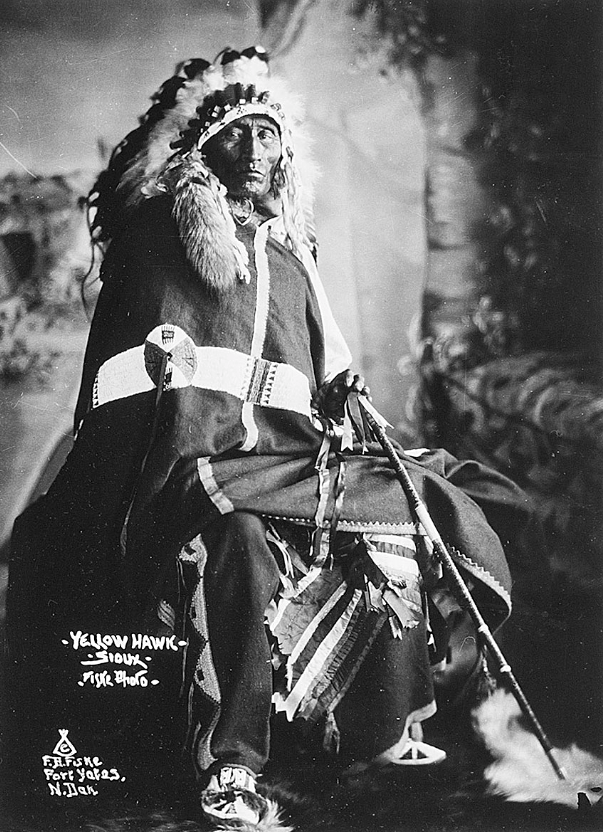
Yellow Hawk, Cheyenne River Sioux Chief

Chief Yellow Hawk (also known as Ci-tan-gi) was a leader of the Sans Arc Lakota (Itazipco) a sub-group of the Cheyenne River Sioux tribe. In 1867 Yellow Hawk was a member of the delegation of Native American representatives who signed the Medicine Lodge Treaty and in 1868, the Treaty of Fort Laramie, protecting tribal lands from further seizure and encroachment by the United States Government. During the Lewis and Clark Expedition, Yellow Hawk was a recipient of a Jefferson Peace Medal a later variety of Indian Peace Medals.

== Personal life ==
Yellow Hawk married a mixed race Native American woman, Julia Deloria (also known as Wasicuwin) and had two sons Solomon Yellow Hawk (1847–1930), and Steven Yellow Hawk (1842–1909). Deloria, part Anglo-American and Yankton Dakota settler, was found as a child by the family of Yellow Hawk when her village was destroyed.

== Political actions ==
=== Treaty of Fort Laramie (1868) ===
From 1778 to 1871, approximately 370 treaties with Native Americans were ratified by the United States. The Treaty of Fort Laramie—in which the Sioux agreed to settle within the Black Hills reservation in the Dakota Territory—was established in the spring of 1868 at Fort Laramie, in the Wyoming Territory. Yellow Hawk was one of signers of the treaty guaranteeing to the Lakota ownership of the Black Hills, and further land and hunting rights in South Dakota, Wyoming, and Montana.
