= Battle of Point Pleasant =

Battle between Virginian militia and Native Americans

- Part of Dunmore's War
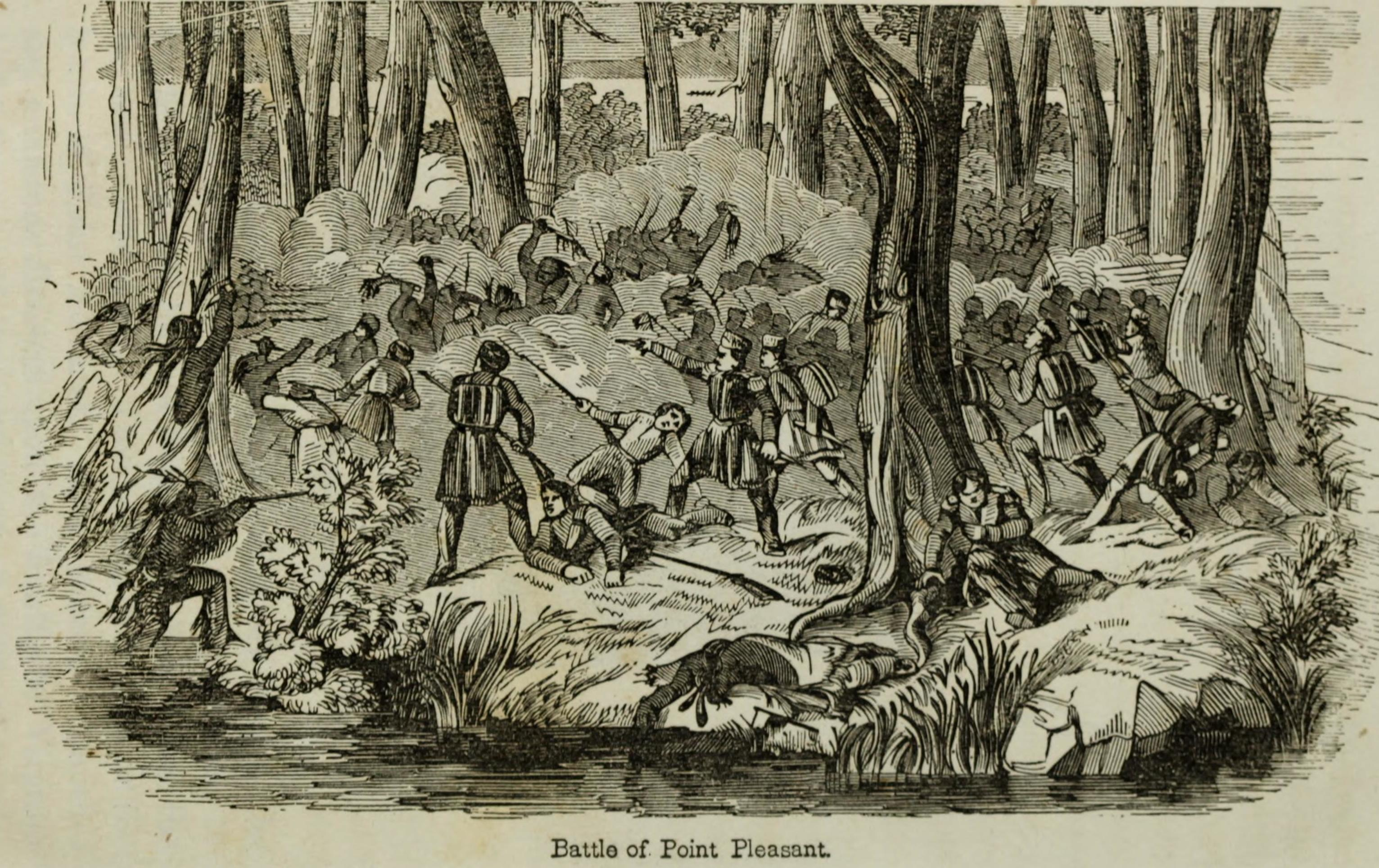
- Battle of Point Pleasant by John Frost
| Date | October 10, 1774 |
| Location | Point Pleasant, Virginia 38°50′21″N 82°08′27″W |
| Result | Virginian victory |

Belligerents
| Virginia | Shawnee; Mingo |

Commanders and leaders
| Andrew Lewis; Charles Lewis †; Thomas Buford † | Cornstalk; Pukeshinwa †; Blue Jacket |

Strength
| 1,000 | 300–500 |

Casualties and losses
| ~75 killed ~140 wounded | +41 killed unknown wounded |
- Point Pleasant Battleground
- U.S. National Register of Historic Places
- Location within West Virginia Location within the United States
- Location: SW corner of Main and 1st Sts., Point Pleasant, West Virginia
- Area: 5.3 acres (2.1 ha)
- Built: 1774
- NRHP reference No.: 70000656
- Added to NRHP: January 26, 1970

The Battle of Point Pleasant, also known as the Battle of Kanawha and the Battle of Great Kanawha, was the only major action of Dunmore's War. It was fought on October 10, 1774, between the Virginia militia and Shawnee and Mingo warriors. Along the Ohio River near modern-day Point Pleasant, West Virginia, forces under the Shawnee chief Cornstalk attacked Virginia militiamen under Colonel Andrew Lewis, hoping to halt Lewis's advance into the Ohio Valley. After a long and furious battle, Cornstalk retreated. After the battle, the Virginians, along with a second force led by Lord Dunmore, the Royal Governor of Virginia, marched into the Ohio Valley and compelled Cornstalk to agree to a treaty, which ended the war.

== Preparations ==
Colonel Andrew Lewis, in command of about 1,000 men, was part of a planned two-pronged Virginian invasion of the Ohio Valley. As Lewis's force made its way down the Kanawha River, guided by pioneering hunter/trapper Matthew Arbuckle Sr., Lewis anticipated linking up with another force commanded by John Murray, 4th Earl of Dunmore, who was marching west from Fort Pitt, then known as Fort Dunmore. Dunmore's plan was to march into the Ohio Valley and force the Indigenous inhabitants to accept Ohio River boundary which had been negotiated with the Haudenosaunee in the 1768 Treaty of Fort Stanwix.

The Shawnee, however, had not been consulted in the treaty and many were not willing to surrender their lands south of the Ohio River without a fight. Officials of the British Indian Department, led by Sir William Johnson until his death in July 1774, worked to diplomatically isolate the Shawnee from their neighbors. As a result, when the war began, the Shawnees had few allies other than the Mingo.

Cornstalk, the Shawnee leader, moved to intercept Lewis's army, hoping to prevent the Virginians from joining their forces together. Estimates of the size of Cornstalk's force have varied, but scholars now believe Cornstalk was probably outnumbered at least two to one, having between 300 and 500 warriors. Future Shawnee leader Blue Jacket most likely participated in this battle.

== Battle ==
Cornstalk's forces attacked Lewis's camp where the Kanawha River joins the Ohio River, hoping to trap him along a bluff. The battle lasted for hours and the fighting eventually became hand-to-hand. Cornstalk's voice was reportedly heard over the din of the battle, urging his warriors to "be strong." Lewis sent several companies along the Kanawha and up a nearby creek to attack the warriors from the rear, which reduced the intensity of the Shawnee offensive. Captain George Mathews was credited with a flanking maneuver that initiated Cornstalk's retreat. At nightfall, the Shawnees quietly withdrew back across the Ohio. The Virginians had held their ground, and thus are considered to have won.

== Aftermath ==
The Virginians lost about 75 killed and 140 wounded. The Shawnee's losses could not be determined, since they carried away their wounded and threw many of the dead into the river. The next morning, Colonel William Christian, who had arrived shortly after the battle, marched his men over the battlefield. They found twenty-one dead warriors in the open, and twelve more were discovered hastily covered with brush and old logs. Among those killed was Pucksinwah, the father of Tecumseh.

Besides scalps, the Virginians reportedly captured 40 guns, many tomahawks and some other plunder which was later sold at auction for 74£ 4s 6d.

The Battle of Point Pleasant forced Cornstalk to make peace at the Treaty of Camp Charlotte, ceding to Virginia the Shawnee claims to all lands south of the Ohio River (today's states of Kentucky and West Virginia). The Shawnee were also obliged by the treaty to return all white captives and cease their attacks on barges of settlers traveling on the Ohio River.

Colonel John Field, an ancestor of United States Presidents George H. W. Bush and George W. Bush, was killed in the battle.

== See also ==
- Tu-Endie-Wei State Park
- John Stuart (Virginia)

== Bibliography ==
- Downes, Randolph C. Council Fires on the Upper Ohio: A Narrative of Indian Affairs in the Upper Ohio Valley until 1795. Pittsburgh: University of Pittsburgh Press, 1940. ISBN 0-8229-5201-7 (1989 reprint).
- Lewis, Virgil A., History of the Battle of Point Pleasant. Charleston, West Virginia: Tribune, 1909. Reprinted Maryland: Willow Bend, 2000. ISBN 1-888265-59-0.
- Randall, E. O. The Dunmore War. Columbus, Ohio: Heer, 1902.
- Randall, Emilius Oviatt and Daniel Joseph Ryan. History of Ohio: the rise and progress of an American state, Volume 2. The Century History Company, 1912, public domain online edition
- Roosevelt, Theodore. The winning of the West, Volume 1 (1889) pp 227–33 online edition
- Smith, Thomas H., ed. Ohio in the American Revolution: A Conference to Commemorate the 200th Anniversary of the Ft. Gower Resolves. Columbus: Ohio Historical Society, 1976.
- Sugden, John. Blue Jacket: Warrior of the Shawnees. Lincoln and London: University of Nebraska Press, 2000. ISBN 0-8032-4288-3.
- Thwaites, Reuben Gold and Louise Phelps Kellogg, eds. Documentary History of Dunmore's War, 1774. Madison: Wisconsin Historical Society, 1905. Reprinted Baltimore: Clearfield, 2002. ISBN 0-8063-5180-2.
