= Black Hoof =

Shawnee tribal leader

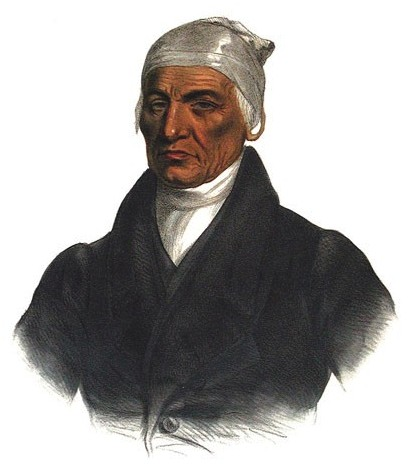
Black Hoof from an posthumous 1836 lithograph published in History of the Indian Tribes of North America

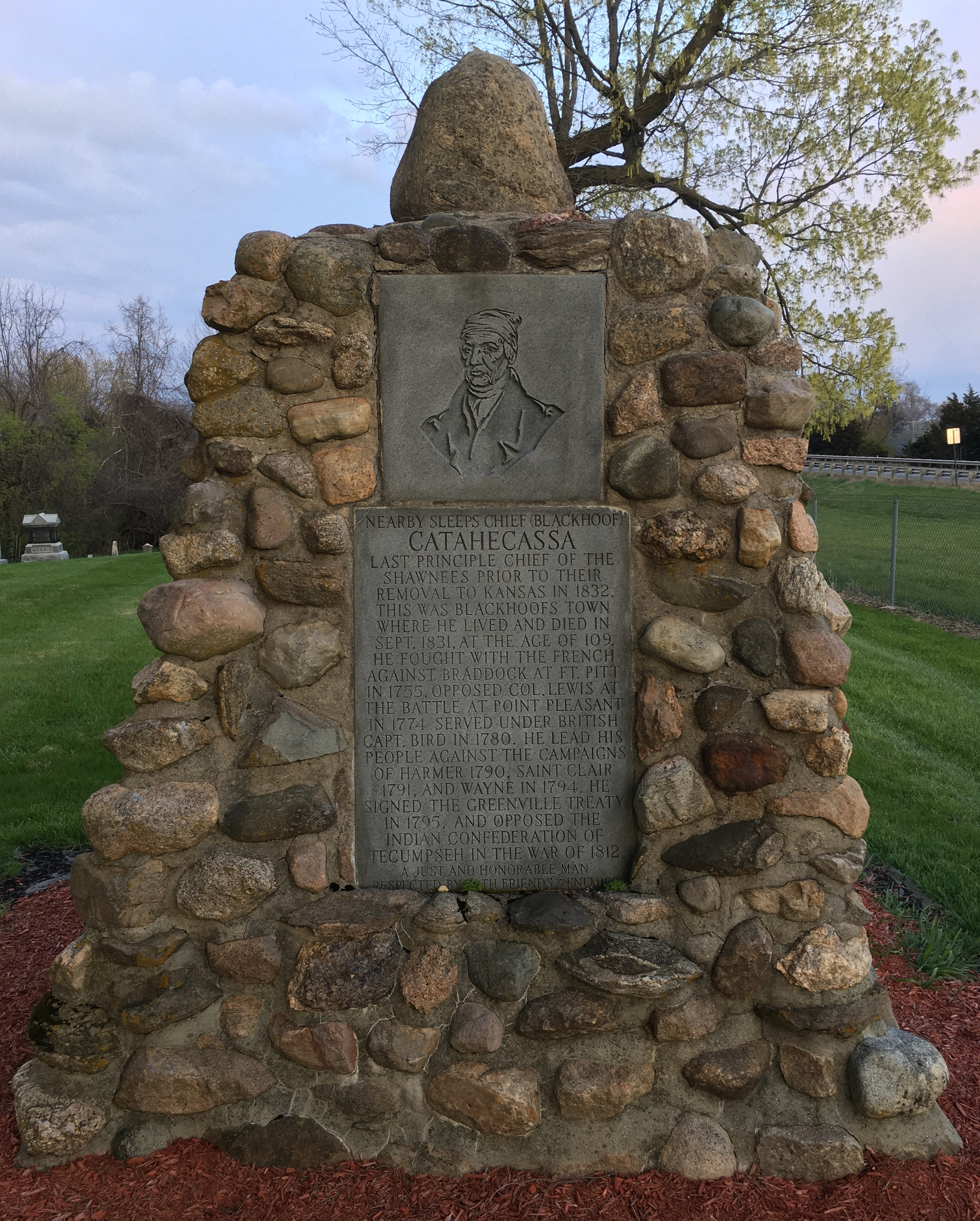
Black Hoof's headstone in Saint Johns, Ohio

Catecahassa (spelled Ca-ta-he-cas-sa) or Black Hoof (c. 1740 – 1831) was the head civil chief of the Shawnee Indians in the Ohio Country during the late 18th and 19th centuries. A member of the Mekoche division of the Shawnees, Black Hoof became known as a fierce warrior during the early wars between the Shawnee and encroaching American settlers. His long time serving as chief, until his death in 1831, he was involved in major events from the French and Indian war to the War of 1812 where he played a pivotal role to the Shawnee response to U.S. expansion.

Black Hoof was believed to be born around the early or mid-18th century with his exact birth year being unknown. During Black Hoofs youth, the Shawnee were reestablishing themselves after years of displacement by U.S. settlers, by the 1750s the Shawnees returned to Ohio after earlier migrations from the south. As a child he may have been a member of a wandering band of some 400 Shawnees led by Peter Chartier between 1745 and 1748, who founded the community in Kentucky called Eskippakithiki and later moved to Sylacauga, Alabama, eventually settling in Old Shawneetown, Illinois.

Black Hoofs rise to power came through his courage and leadership displayed on the battlefield. By his men he was known as a fearless warrior and great leader. The Shawnees have been described as "one of the most warlike tribes" that have fought in multiple conflicts. Blackhoof distinguished himself through these skirmishes. Black Hoof likely took part in major Shawnee actions of the Revolutionary era. The siege of Boonesborough in 1778 as well as the defense of Shawnee such as Chillicothe in 1779-individual details of his part in these battles is unclear. What is clear, is that the Shawnee had a reputation for ruthlessness in battle against the frontier Americans and earned a respectable reputation among the settlers. A U.S. Army officer of the time had reportedly described Black Hoof as having "been engaged in so many battles" that few native warriors could match his level of battle experience.

Black Hoof's newfound respect from both sides had put him in position to be placed as a diplomat. In an 1802 conference, Black Hoof gave a speech to promote diplomacy and demonstrated his commitment to peace. Observerse noted that Black Hoof was known for his oratorical skills, and it is recorded that he served as the Shawnees spokesman in dealings with the U.S. for many years after. In 1807-1808 he traveled to Washington where he continued his diplomatic work. Black Hoof welcomed a group of "Quakers" to live among the Shawnee and teach farming techniques.

Like Little Turtle of the Miamis, Black Hoof decided that Native Americans needed to adapt culturally to the ways of the Euro-Americans in order to prevent decimation through warfare. During his later years, Black Hoof became an ally of the United States and was responsible for keeping the majority of the Shawnee nation from joining Tecumseh's War, which became part of the War of 1812.

Black Hoof resisted the policy of Indian removal that the United States implemented soon after the War of 1812. He never signed a removal treaty, and continued to lead his tribe until his death in Saint Johns, Ohio in 1831. After his death, the Shawnee were eventually compelled to emigrate to the West.
