= Indian agent =

Person authorized to interact with Native Americans on behalf of the United States

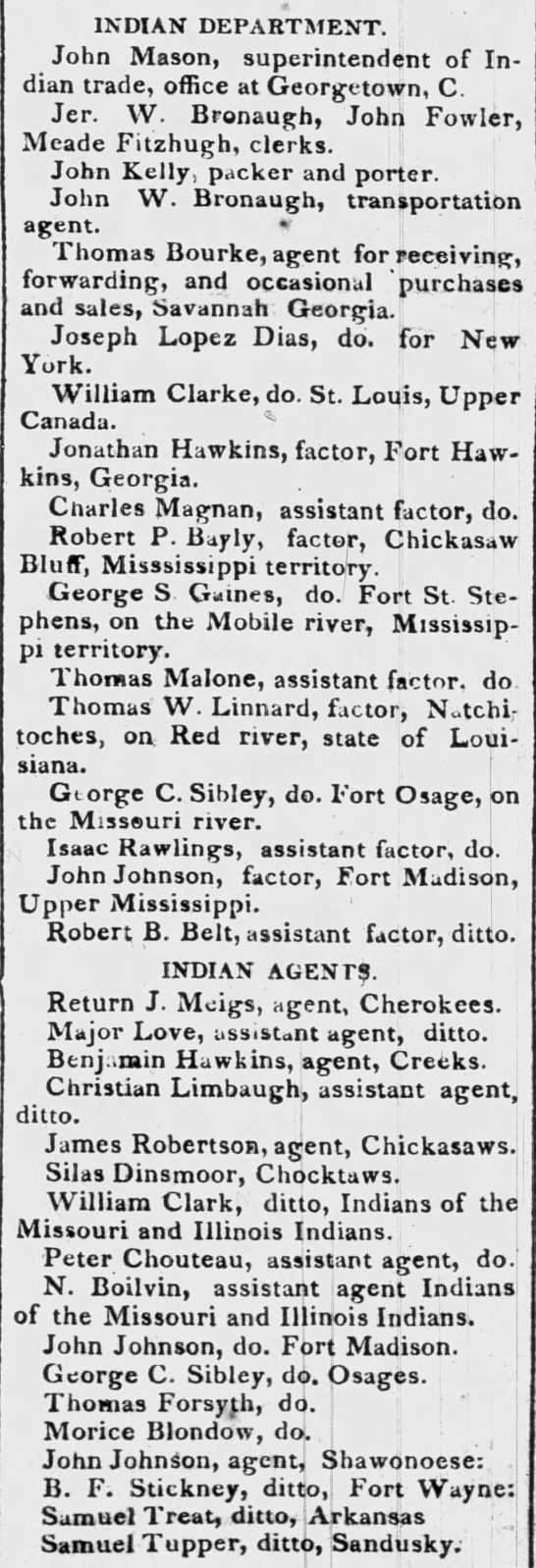
Indian agents of the U.S. government in 1813

In United States history, an Indian agent was an individual authorized to interact with American Indian tribes on behalf of the U.S. government.

== History ==
The federal regulation of Indian affairs in the United States first included development of the position of Indian agent in the Nonintercourse Act of 1793, a revision of the original 1790 law. This required land sales by or from Indians to be federally licensed and permitted. The legislation also authorized the President to "appoint such persons, from time to time, as temporary agents to reside among the Indians," and guide them into acculturation of American society by changing their agricultural practices and domestic activities. The act also aimed to regulate trade and relations between Native Americans and European American settlers.

From the close of the 18th century to nearly 1869, Congress maintained the position that it was legally responsible for the protection of Indians from non-Indians, and in establishing this responsibility it "continue[d] to deal with Indian tribes by utilizing agents to negotiate treaties under the jurisdiction of the Department of War." As a practical matter, especially in early days, Indian agents also "served as spies, on the lookout for tribal interaction with representatives of foreign governments."

An Indian agent's duties included preventing conflicts between settlers and Indians, reporting violations of intercourse laws to superintendents", and seeing to the distribution of annuities granted by the state or federal government to Indian tribes. Typically, annuities to a tribe were transferred (in the form of money or goods) from the Indian agent to the tribe's chief, and then distributed to the tribe, although this practice went into decline by the mid-1800s. Indian agents were also involved in Indian removal.

In the 1830s, the primary role of Indian agents was to assist in commercial trading supervision between traders and Indians, while agents possessed the authority to both issue and revoke commercial trading licenses.

In 1849, the Bureau of Indian Affairs decided to place the position of Indian agent under civilian jurisdiction. This came at a time when many white Americans saw the role of Indian agent as largely inefficient and dishonest in monetary and severalty dealings with various Indian tribes.American legal historians Paul Finkelman and Tim Alan Garrison say that the Bureau of Indian Affairs faced many "accusations of dishonesty and mismanagement".

By 1850, many citizens had been calling for reform of the agents in the Bureau of Indian Affairs. In 1849, the Bureau of Indian Affairs was transferred from the Department of War to the Department of the Interior. Army officials objected to the transfer, citing the corrupting nature of civilian presence. Despite its deeply felt convictions that its Indian agents were appointed and removed on merit, the civilian Board of Commissioners was frequently deemed corrupt, portrayed derogatorily in print and propaganda, and inadvertently assumed the scapegoat for the perceived inefficiency of Indian-White affairs: the Indian agent.

In 1869 the bureau created the civilian-controlled Board of Indian Commissioners. This civilian-run board was charged "with responsibility for supervising the disbursement of Indian appropriations" from state and federal governments.

By the late 19th century, the responsibilities of Indian agents began to change slightly in the wake of the recent attempts to 'civilize' Indians, assimilating them into American culture. Despite the public scorn for the agents, the Indian Office stated that the "chief duty of an agent is to induce his Indian to labor in civilized pursuits. To attain this end every possible influence should be brought to bear, and in proportion as it is attained ... an agent is successful or unsuccessful."

During the late nineteenth and early twentieth centuries, Indian agents served as a link between the U.S. government and Native families. The National Native American Boarding School Healing Coalition states that "Indian children were forcibly abducted by government agents", referring to the Indian agent. Specifically Indian agents took on the responsibility of identifying, registering, and forcibly removing children from their homes to attend boarding schools. These boarding schools were specifically designed to take children away from their Native lifestyles and instead promote assimilation into Euro-American society American Indian boarding schools .Leech Lake Ojibwe geography Deondre Smiles notes that Indigenous children "were taken from their families and communities and sent to boarding schools far from their homes, where they were trained to adopt settler customs". There students were given industrial training and encouraged to permanently abandon their languages, cultural practices and community ties.

General conditions across Indian boarding schools were harsh, directly reflecting the kind of coercive environment made by the assimilation system. The Washington Post conducted a year-long investigation revealing at least 3,104 Native American children died at boarding schools between the years 1828 and 1970, this is around three times the number previously recognized by the U.S. government. Students at these boarding schools faced extreme punishments, forced labor, disease, malnutrition, and overcrowding. Over 800 children were buried in cemeteries at or near these schools, most often without their bodies ever being returned to their families or tribes.

Many families still tried to keep an emotional and cultural connection with their children, regardless of the enforced separation by federal boarding school policies. Ojibwe historian Brenda J. Child, notes, "Parents and relatives wrote letters to their children at school, urging them to remember their families and communities and expressing concern for their wellbeing".

== Violence against Native women ==
Throughout the 19th century, Indian agents and Native women had unequal relationships fostered by unequal gender and power dynamics that enabled abuse. Indian agents used their federal authority to utilize extensive control over resources, legal matters, and daily affairs. Native women already marginalized by colonial structures and patriarchal norms, were then put into positions of even more vulnerability. This kind of imbalance only encouraged Indian agents to exploit their federal authority and rarely faced any accountability, strengthening a system that limited Native women's means of resistance and protection.

The power imbalance heavily influenced by gender played a significant role in enabling systems of coercion and sexual violence. Public Health researcher Robin Wyatt explains that "violence against Native women became a central element in the colonial strategy for conquest and genocide…women were targeted due to their ability to sustain tribes". Abuse towards Native women were not unique incidents but a part of this much larger colonial structure that normalized violence towards Native women. Wyatt also notes "86 to 96 percent of the sexual abuse of Native women is committed by non-Indigenous perpetrators who are rarely brought to justice".

These abusive relationships were supported and allowed to continue by racial, gendered, and institutional rankings that worked together to not only protect the perpetrators Wyatt mentioned but also worked at silencing survivors. Indigenous health researchers Karina L. Walter, Jane M. Simoni, and Karina Lehavot explain that "systematic failings have contributed to indifference and resignation to colonial violence in the everyday lives of Native women…to steadily erode Native women's sense of agency in combating justice".

By the 1870s, due to president Grant's Peace Policy, the average Indian agent was primarily nominated by various Christian denominations due to the increase in civilization reforms to Indian-white affairs, especially over land. Part of the Christian message of reform, carried out by the Indian agents, demonstrated the pervasive thought of Indian land ownership of the late 19th century: civilization can only be possible when Indians cease communal living in favor of private ownership. Many citizens still held the activities of Indian agents in poor esteem, calling the agents themselves "unprincipled opportunists" and people of low quality.

- In the 1880 Instruction to Indian Agents, it states the job duties of the Indian agent as follows:
  - See that Indians in one's designated locality are not "idle for want of an opportunity to labor or of instructions as to how to go to work," and
  - absolutely "no work must be given to white men which can be done by Indians"
  - See to it that the Indians under one's jurisdiction can farm successfully and solely for the subsistence of their respective family
  - Enforce prohibition of liquor
  - Both provide and supervise the instruction of English education and industrial training for Indian children
  - Allow Indians to leave the reservation only if they have acquired a permit for such (permits were only irregularly granted)
  - As of July 1884, Indian agents were to compile an annual report of their reservations for submission aimed at collecting the following information from Indian respondents: Indian name, English name, Relationship, Sex, and Name among other statistical information.

== Abolition of the Indian agent ==
When Theodore Roosevelt reached the presidency at the turn of the 20th century (1901–1909), the Indian agents that remained on the government payroll were all replaced by school superintendents.

The post was officially abolished in 1908 by the commissioner of Indian Affairs Francis Leupp. History scholar David Wishart states that Leupp believed doctors and teachers would be more successful at encouraging assimilation. Although the position had been abolished, Native women still faced abuse from superintendents. In 1925, Ruth Muskrat Bronson a Cherokee Nation poet and Indian right activist, wrote "The Serpent," which focuses on an Indian superintendent sexually assaulting generations of young women. The story shows how Native women still endured coercion and abuse from those in higher positions, despite their Indian agent title being removed. Bronson writes "the Indian agent was sprawled on the ground…fastened around his wrists with a grip he could not claw free was a little yellow snake…the old Cherokee woman sat, still motionless and without expression". Native communities developed diverse strategies to resistance against Indian agent control, as they fought to protect themselves and preserve their culture.

The end of the Indian Agent system posed many changes for Native communities. Bands could now elect their own chiefs and administer their own services such as education, housing, and water treatment. Most importantly, the abolition of Indian agents meant that the citizens of the Native communities once assigned to these Indian agents would no longer be victims of maltreatment, bias, and surveillance by an Indian Agent.

== Ongoing issues related to Indian agent abuse ==
Despite the abolition of the Indian Agent role, these abusive patterns towards Native American women still persist. Mvskoke Nation law scholar Sarah Deer states that "The crisis of rape in tribal communities is inextricably linked to the way in which the United States developed and sustained a legal system". Native women still experience disproportionately high levels of violence not seen by any other group in the United States. According to sociologists Tassy Parker (Seneca Nation), Allyson Kelley, Lee Redeye, and Marcello A. Maviglia, "more than 84 percent of Native women experience some form of violence in their lifetime, the highest rate of any demographic group in the country". The homicide rates for Native women are also 2.8 times higher compared to those of white women, in some areas these statistics can be ten times higher than the national average. Similar to colonial times, 96 percent of perpetrators are non-Native.

This extent of widespread violence has serious lasting health consequences, though Native women are often unable to receive proper medical attention and care. Domestic violence increases rates of physical injury, missing work or school, and results in long term mental health illnesses such as depression and post traumatic stress disorder. These are only made worse by the underfunding experienced by healthcare services in Native communities. Federal funding aimed to serve victims of crime have often excluded tribes from this aid. This lack of support and healthcare infrastructure means the mental and physical abuse endured by Native people are often untreated, only reinforcing their trauma and vulnerability.

In response to these issues there has been a number of policy efforts and grassroot movements that push for change. Specifically, advocacy efforts like the Missing and Murdered Indigenous Women movement raised awareness and demanded accountability from prosecutors. There have also been Legislative improvements like the Not Invisible Act of 2019 that aimed to improve communication between tribal, federal, and state authorities, in hopes of eliminating any gaps that hindered justice. Parker, Kelly, Redeye, and Maviglia recommend broader structural reforms that address equitable funding, culturally informed funding, and research, and policies that specifically address the root causes of this violence. According to Parker, Kelley, Redeye, and Maviglia, these policy efforts and movements can work together to address and reduce violence against Native women.

== Notable Indian agents ==
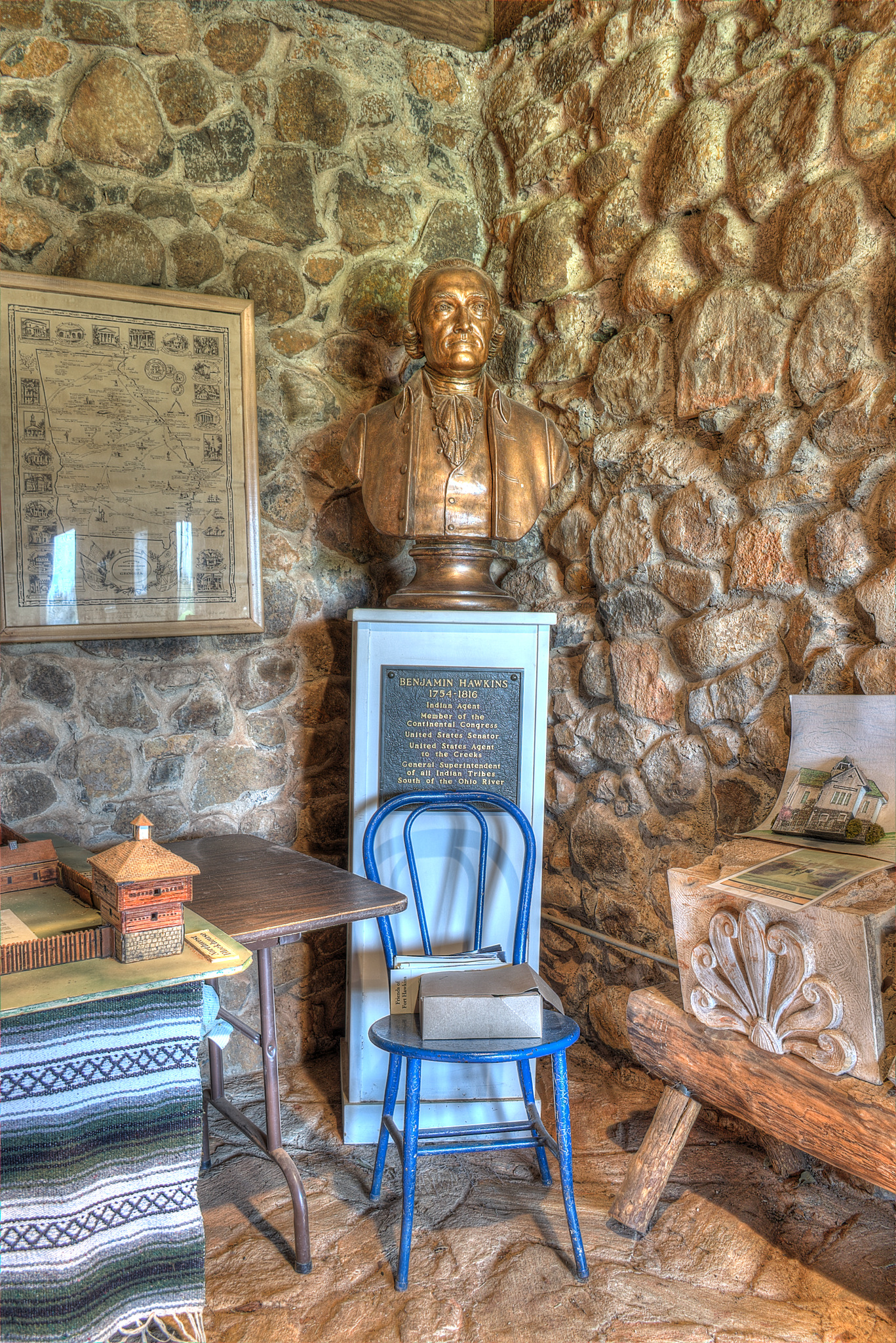
Bust of Benjamin Hawkins

Individuals who have served as Indian agents include the following:

- Charles Adams, Indian agent for the Ute Mountain Agency, 1870–1874
- Robert Alden, Indian Agent for the Fort Berthold Agency in the Dakota Territory, 1877–1877. Known as Rev. Robert Alden in Laura Ingalls Wilder's books.
- Herman Bendell, Last Indian Agent for the Arizona Territory, 1871-1873
- Kit Carson, Indian agent to the Ute Indians and the Jicarilla Apaches, 1850s
- Leander Clark, Indian agent for the Sac and Fox in Iowa beginning in 1866
- John Clum, Indian agent for the San Carlos Apache Indian Reservation in the Arizona Territory
- John Coffee, U.S. commissioner to negotiate what became the Treaty of Dancing Rabbit Creek
- Cave Johnson Couts, American military officer, rancher, and judge
- Douglas H. Cooper, agent for the Choctaw Nation in 1853 and Chickasaw Nation in 1856; resigned to serve as a military officer in the Confederate Army in 1860.
- John Crowell, Alabama's first member of the House of Representatives, then agent to the Creek people
- Brinton Darlington, Indian agent at Darlington Agency to the Cheyenne and Arapaho, 1869–1872
- George Davenport, Indian agent for the Sac and Fox in Illinois and Iowa, after the War of 1812 through the Black Hawk War of 1832
- Silas Dismoor, agent to the Choctaw
- John Eaton, U.S. commissioner to negotiate what became the Treaty of Dancing Rabbit Creek
- Aaron Freeman, agent to the Chowan in North Carolina from 1770 to 1810. Freeman also ran a tavern in Rowan and owned 250 acres of land.
- Benjamin Hawkins, agent to the Creek people and other southern Indians under Presidents George Washington, John Adams, and Thomas Jefferson. One of the most successful agents.
- Thomas Hinds, commissioned in 1820 with Andrew Jackson to negotiate what became the Treaty of Doak's Stand
- Gad Humphreys, agent to the Seminole
- Andrew Jackson (along with David Meriwether and Jesse Franklin), appointed in 1816 by Secretary of War William Crawford to be Indian commissioner to the Choctaw, Chickasaw and Cherokee
- Luther Kelly (Yellowstone Kelly), Indian Agent for the San Carlos Apache Indian Reservation; Arizona Territory under President Theodore Roosevelt, 1904–1909
- Valentine McGillycuddy, Indian agent of Red Cloud Agency
- John McKee, agent to the Cherokee, Choctaw, and Chickasaw
- James McLaughlin active 1876–1923, Devils Lake Agency (1876–1881), Standing Rock Sioux Agency (1881–?)
- Nathan Meeker, Indian agent for the White River Utes for a brief time, 1878–1879, until killed in the Meeker Massacre
- Return J. Meigs Sr., agent to the Cherokee in Tennessee from 1801 to 1823
- John DeBras Miles, Indian agent for the Kickapoo Agency, 1868–1871. Indian agent for the Cheyenne and Arapaho, 1878–1884.
- Major Laban J. Miles, Indian agent at Osage Agency to the Osage and Kaw, 1878–1893. Uncle of president Herbert Hoover.
- George Morgan, Indian agent to the Lenape during the American Revolutionary War
- Abel C. Pepper, Indian agent in Indiana
- Robert Latham Owen, Indian agent in Indian Territory 1886–1890. Part-Cherokee by birth, Owen was later elected one of the first two U.S. senators from Oklahoma.
- John Rhea, commissioner for the Treaty of the Choctaw Trading House
- James Robertson, agent to the Chickasaw
- Henry Schoolcraft, agent to the Ojibwe in Michigan in the 1820s and 1830s
- Isaac Shelby, commissioner with Andrew Jackson for the Treaty of Tuscaloosa of 1818
- John Sibley, physician and agent to Louisiana tribes included the Taensas
- Lawrie Tatum, Indian agent at Fort Sill Agency to the Kiowa and Comanche. Guardian of future President Herbert Hoover and his siblings Theodore and Mary.
- John Q. Tufts, Indian agent in Muskogee Indian Territory, 1879–1887
- William Wells, Indian agent from 1792 to 1812; considered a "white Indian" because of his former association with the Miami Indians and role as an Indian agent interpreter
- James Wilkinson, agent to the Choctaw
- Major David John Mosher Wood, Indian agent for the Ponca, Pawnee, Otoe, and Oakland Agency, in the Indian Territory, 1889–1893. Brother of Col. Samuel Newitt Wood.
- O. M. Wozencraft, Indian agent in California, 1850–1852
- George Bingenheimer, agent at Standing Rock, 1898–1903

== See also ==
- William Holland Thomas
- Indian agency police

== Works cited ==
- "Indian Agents: Rulers of the Reserves" By John L. Steckley, 2016 Peter Lang Publishing
- "Indian Agent: Peter Ellis Bean in Mexican Texas" By Jack Jackson, 2005 Texas A&M University Press
- "The Silver Man: The Life and Times of Indian Agent John Kinzie" By Peter Shrake, 2016 Wisconsin Historical Society
- "The Official Correspondence of James S. Calhoun: While Indian Agent at Santa Fé and Superintendent of Indian Affairs in New Mexico" by James S. Calhoun, 1915 U.S. Government Printing Office
- "Christopher Gist: Colonial Frontiersman, Explorer, and Indian Agent" by Kenneth P. Bailey, 1976 Archon Books
