= Edwina Butler-Wolfe =

American politician

Governor of the Absentee Shawnee Tribe of Indians
- In office 2013–2019

Personal details
- Born: Oklahoma, U.S.
- Spouse: Leonard Wolfe
- Children: 1
- Education: Oklahoma Baptist University
- Profession: Politician

Edwina Butler-Wolfe is a former Shawnee politician. She served as governor of the Absentee-Shawnee Tribe of Indians of Oklahoma from 2013 until 2019, totaling three terms. She is the only woman to serve as Absentee-Shawnee Tribe of Indians of Oklahoma governor. She is also the only Absentee-Shawnee Tribe of Indians of Oklahoma governor to be elected for a third term.

== Early life and education ==
Edwina Butler-Wolfe was born in Oklahoma. She attended Dale High School in Dale, Oklahoma. She attended Seminole State College, Rose State College, St. Gregory’s University and Oklahoma Baptist University.

== Career ==
Butler-Wolfe has worked as a project manager, grant writer, fund development manager, and event planner.

She became governor of the Absentee-Shawnee Tribe of Indians of Oklahoma in 2013. She served three terms. During her tenure, she was a member of the National Congress of American Indians and she opposed the use of Native American stereotypes and images in professional sports. She also signed the first memorandum of understanding between the tribe and the American Red Cross, ensuring the Red Cross would provide emergency response support to the tribe.

John Raymond Johnson was her successor in 2019.

After her governorship, Butler-Wolfe became education director of the Sac and Fox Nation.

== Personal life ==
She plays basketball. She is married to Leonard Wolfe. She has one son.

Butler-Wolfe credits Wilma Mankiller as an inspiration for her becoming involved politically.

== See also ==
- List of Native American politicians
- Native American women in politics
