= Ernest Spybuck =

Shawnee painter from Oklahoma, U.S. (1883–1949)

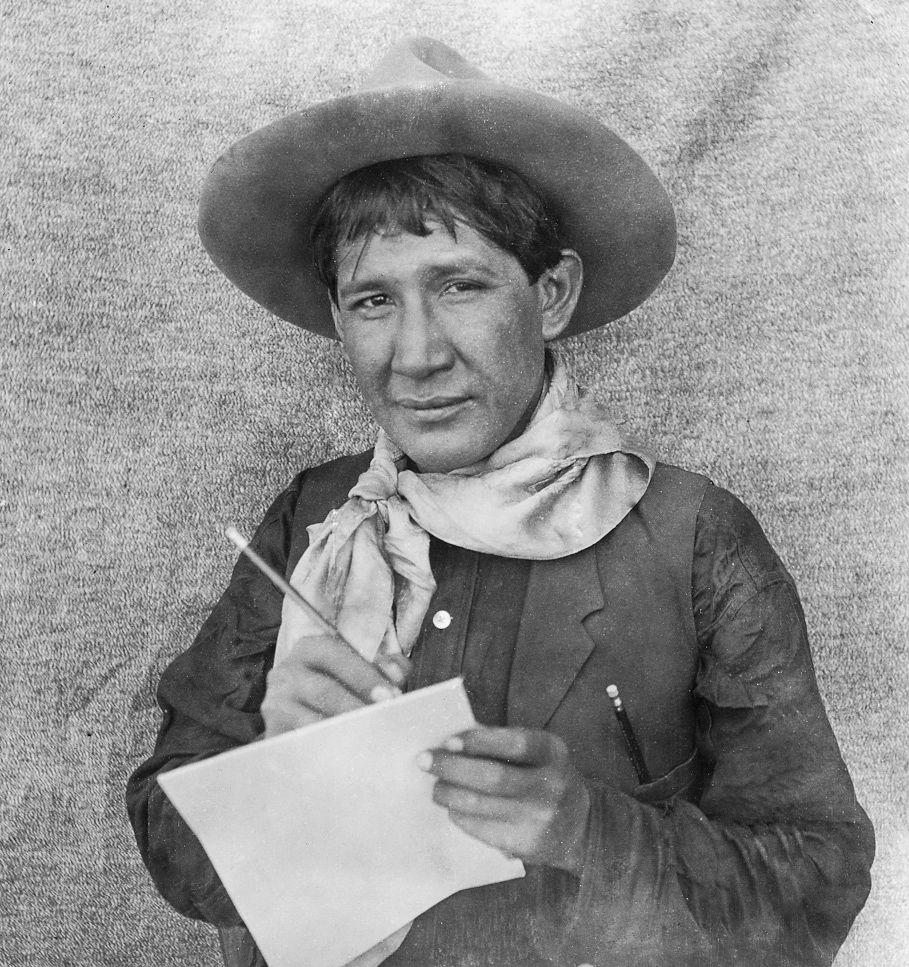
- Ernest Spybuck, Absentee Shawnee artist, ca. 1910
- Born: January 1883; Potawatomi/Shawnee Reservation, Indian Territory
- Died: 1949 (aged 66); On Indian allotment land, 16 miles west of Tecumseh, Oklahoma
- Other names: Maythela, Mathkacea
- Citizenship: Absentee-Shawnee Tribe of Indians of Oklahoma and American
- Education: Self-taught
- Known for: Painting, drawing
- Movement: Native American modernism
- Patrons: M. R. Harrington

Earnest Spybuck (January 1883 – 1949) was an Absentee Shawnee Native American artist, who was born on the land allotted the Shawnee Indians in Indian Territory and what was to later become Pottawatomie County, Oklahoma, near the town of Tecumseh.

After his collection of his art by anthropologist Mark Raymond Harrington, Spybuck's work was received positively by both Native American and non-native artistic communities. Many of his works are now held by the Smithsonian's National Museum of the American Indian.

== Early life ==
Ernest Spybuck was born on his Shawnee Tribal Allotment near what was later to become Tecumseh, Oklahoma, to the White Turkey Band of the Absentee Shawnee, of the Rabbit clan. His parents were Peahchepeahso and John Spybuck. His Shawnee name was Mathkacea or Mahthela. He preferred the spelling of his first name as "Earnest."

By the time he was born the Absentee band of Shawnee, like many tribes originally residing east of the Mississippi River, had been forcibly removed to Indian Territory by the U. S. government. Many different tribal peoples were settled in close proximity to each other so Spybuck grew up with the neighboring Sauk and Fox, Kickapoo, and Citizen Pottawatomie people.

Spybuck attended school at the Shawnee Boarding School near his home and at Sacred Heart Mission in south-central Pottawatomie County. According to his teacher, when he was eight years old, Spybuck would do nothing but draw and paint pictures with subjects drawn from his life. His education never went beyond the McGuffey's Third Reader.

At the age of 19, Spybuck married his wife Anna Scott, and the couple had four children, Thomas, Flindie, Hewitt and Virgie Louise. The family lived the entire time on Spybuck's allotment in the Brinton Township, west of Tecumseh, Oklahoma, near the Little Axe community among other Shawnee Tribal members.

== Recognition by M. R. Harrington ==
In about 1910 when Spybuck was nearly 30, his art work became a known outside the tribe when anthropologist Mark Raymond Harrington was told of his paintings. Harrington was traveling among the Indians collecting specimens and researching the tribes of the area for the Museum of the American Indian, Heye Foundation. His assistant brought in Spybuck and some of his work and he was able to examine the man's "unsophisticated" drawings. He appreciated the detailed accuracy of the equipment and dress Spybuck depicted and encouraged him to create watercolors of ceremonies and social life of the tribes in the vicinity.

Spybuck produced watercolors for Harrington through 1921, and Harrington used some in a couple of monographs published by the Heye Foundation. Harrington also interviewed Spybuck for a work on the Shawnee tribe which was never published, but he deposited his notes and Spybuck's paintings with the Museum of the American Indian, which is now the Smithsonian National Museum of the American Indian.

One reviewer discounts Harrington's patronage, claiming that Spybuck was already known for depicting daily life among the local tribes when the two met. His art matured along with his involvement in the local community, which included participating in activities and ceremonies that interested ethnographers.

== Artistic style ==
Reportedly Spybuck told Harrington that he preferred painting cowboys, livestock and range scenes, and some say through Harrington's patronage, Spybuck's style evolved in his choice of subjects and the way he painted them. His style was representational, featuring local scenes of ceremonies, games, social gatherings and the home life he was familiar with and often participated in. His style could be called Plains Flatstyle Representative Art, in which individuals could be identified by the meticulous details of dress and accoutrement, set in a simplified three-dimensional setting with well-defined foreground and background.

However, he took the representational depiction of the figures and settings in a new direction that was uniquely his own. He developed his own unique techniques, such as painting a cross-section "window" in lodge where a ceremony would take place to show the activity inside, while also showing the landscape and time of day outside.

In Western European terms, Spybuck's style might be called naïve art, but his works differ from most naïve artists' due to the influence of the ethnographic patronage that guided him to portray actual Indian life as if intended to narrate rather than simple art. Certain details were often with an infusion of a sense of humor and personality. His scenes provide subtle hints of attitudes and personalities of individuals and often include whimsical details that contrast with the central activities.

== Critical responses ==
Like Harrington, other anthropologists recognized that Spybuck possessed a remarkable talent, and it served a practical purpose in the domain of ethnography. His paintings served as illustrations for numerous anthropological writings. Dobkins calls this practice autoethnography, in which the artist or writer assimilates the techniques of ethnographers to create representations of themselves and their cultures, with the implication of an asymmetrical power relationship between the ethnographer patron and the Native artist. Along with Spybuck, Dobkins names Jesse Cornplanter (Seneca), Peter Pitseolak (Inuit), and Frank Day (Maidu) as artists who practiced autoethnography to regain control over representations of their cultures and to retrieve and preserve their traditions. Other reviewers recognize Spybuck as an Indian artist who is a recorder and preserver of traditional practices in the midst of social change.

In Spybuck's lifetime, works by Native American artists were beginning to become exhibited as art rather than ethnographic specimens. Then in 1991, Shared Visions: Native American Painters and Sculptors in the Twentieth Century was an exhibit that opened at the Heard Museum, Phoenix, Arizona and toured to four major museums in the United States. The exhibition brought together three generations of artists to trace the history of the Native American Fine Art Movement. Together with Arapaho artist Carl Sweezy, the exhibit placed Spybuck in the earliest stage of the movement, Early Narrative Style, in which Native artists documented the upheavals in Indian Country in the late 19th century and early 20th century. They adopted and adapted western techniques of art and ethnography to produce works that documented the transformation of traditional ways.

== Later life ==
Spybuck worked as a farmer, painter, and historical informant. He belonged to a large and influential family within the Absentee Shawnee Nation where he was an active member of the community and became a Peyote leader when the Native American Church was first adopted by Shawnee peoples. He died in 1949 at the age of 66 and was buried in a family plot near his home.

It has been noted that by his mid-50s he had never left the county of his birth. Family members later said, "He was born, raised, worked and buried all in the same place." Despite offers to travel to places where his talent came to be recognized he stayed close to his tribe and shunned celebrity. In addition to having his art published in many books on American Indian cultures, several museums purchased his work for their collections. He was commissioned to produce murals for the Creek Indian Council House and Museum in Okmulgee, Oklahoma and at the Oklahoma Historical Society Museum in Oklahoma City. During his life his work was exhibited at the Museum of the American Indian in New York City and at the American Indian Exposition and Congress in Tulsa, Oklahoma.

== Works ==
Sac and Fox Buffalo Dance, Ernest Spybuck, Smithsonian National Museum of the American Indian

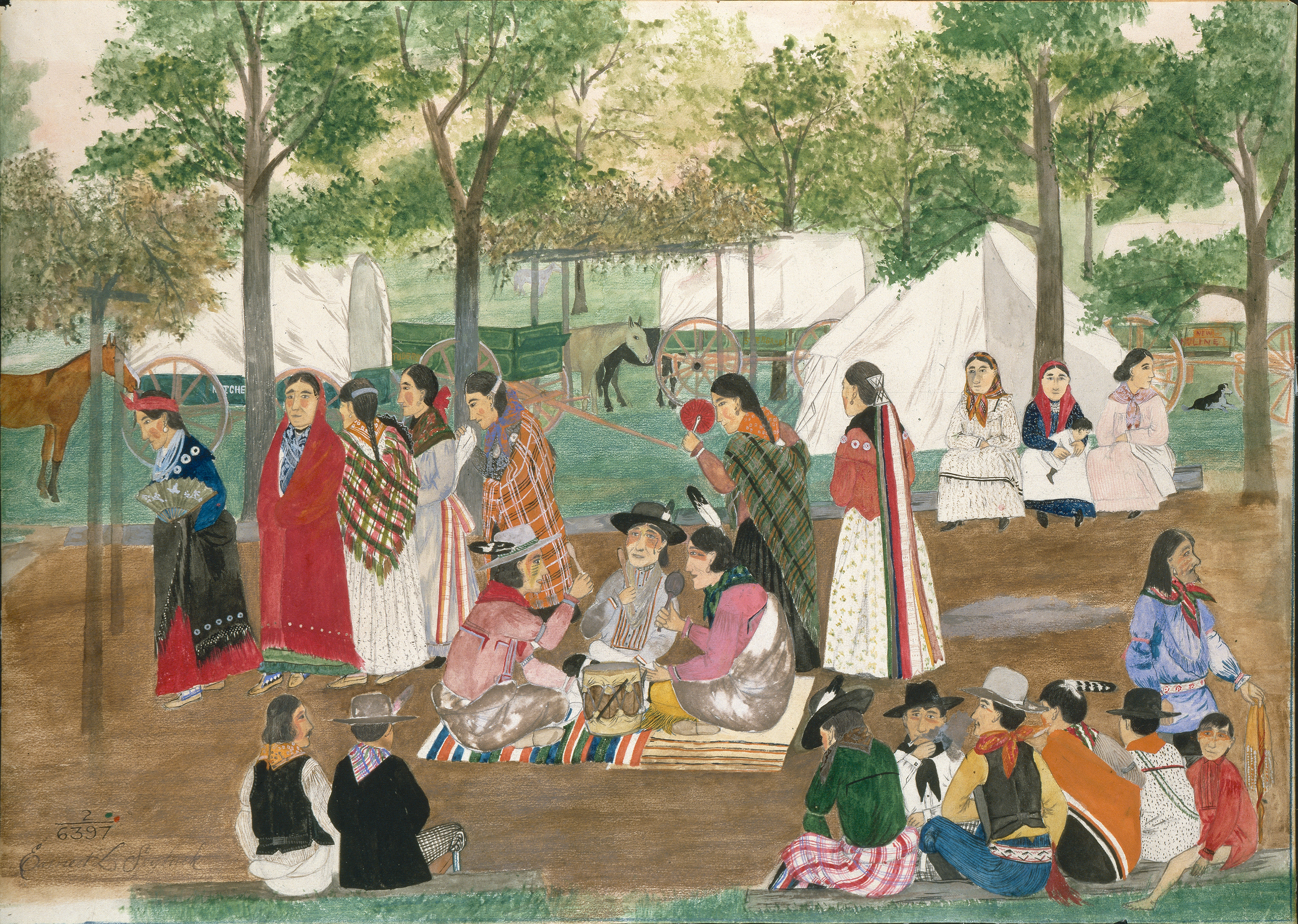
Chicken Dance, Ernest Spybuck, 1908–1910, watercolor and pencil on paperboarrd, collect of the Smithsonian Institution National Museum of the American Indian

== Publications that include Spybuck art ==
- Harrington, M. R. (1914). Sacred bundles of the Sac and Fox Indians. The university museum anthropological publications. Vol. IV(2). Philadelphia: The University Museum.
- Harrington, M. R. (1921). Hodge, F. W. (ed.). Religion and ceremonies of the Lenape. Indian notes and monographs. New York: Museum of the American Indian Heye Foundation.
- Underhill, Ruth M. (1965). Red man's religion. Chicago: University of Chicago Press. ISBN 0-226-84166-9.
- La Farge, Oliver (1957). A pictorial history of the American Indian. New York, N.Y.: Crown Publishers, Inc.
- Grumet, Robert S., ed. (2001). Voices from the Delaware Big House Ceremony. Norman: University of Oklahoma Press. ISBN 0-8061-3360-0.
- La Farge, Oliver. The American Indian: Special edition for young readers. New York: Golden Press. LCCN 60-14881.
- Brody, J. J. (1971). Indian painters & white patrons. Albuquerque: University of New Mexico Press. ISBN 978-0-8263-0192-5.
- Silberman, Arthur 1978. 100 years of native American painting. Oklahoma City: Oklahoma Museum of Art.
- Hightower, Jamake (1978). Many smokes, manymoons: A chronology of American Indian history through Indian art. New York: J. B. Lippincott. ISBN 978-0-397-31781-3.
- Fawcett, David M.; Callander, Lee A. (1982). Native American painting : selections from the Museum of the American Indian. New York: Museum of the American Indian. ISBN 9780934490405.
- Callander, Lee A.; Ruth Slivka (1984). Shawnee Home Life: The Paintings of Earnest Spybuck. New York, N.Y.: Museum of the American Indian. p. 7. ISBN 0-934490-42-2.
- Archuleta, Margaret; Dr. Rennard Strickland (1991). Shared Visions: Native American Painters and Sculptors in the Twentieth Century. Phoenix, Arizona: The Heard Museum. ISBN 1-56584-069-0.

== Major exhibitions ==
- Shawnee Home Life: The Paintings of Earnest Spybuck

Opened at the Museum of the American Indian, New York, New York in 1987, then toured to several museums, including

Mabee-Gerrer Museum of Art, Shawnee, Oklahoma October 21 to December 14, 1986
The Oklahoma Historical Society Museum, Oklahoma City, Oklahoma
Bacone College Museum, Muskogee, Oklahoma

- Shared Visions: Native American Painter and Sculptors in the Twentieth Century

Opened at the Heard Museum, Phoenix, Arizona, on April 13, 1991, then toured to

The Eiteljorg Museum of American Indians and Western Art, Indianapolis, Indiana
The Thomas Gilcrease Institute of American History and Art, Tulsa, Oklahoma
The Oregon Art Institute, Portland Art Museum, Portland, Oregon
The National Museum of the American Indian, Smithsonian Institution, The U.S. Custom House, New York, New York

== Collections ==
- Mabee-Gerrer Museum of Art, Shawnee, Oklahoma (home county to Spybuck)
- National Museum of the American Indian, Smithsonian Institution, Washington, D. C.
- Gilcrease Museum, Tulsa, Oklahoma
- Heard Museum, Phoenix, Arizona
- Oklahoma Historical Society Museum, Oklahoma City, Oklahoma
- Fred Jones Jr. Museum of Art, Norman, Oklahoma

== See also ==
- List of indigenous artists of the Americas
- List of Native American artists
- Visual arts by indigenous peoples of the Americas
