= John Raymond Johnson =

American politician

Governor of the Absentee Shawnee Tribe of Indians
- Incumbent
- Assumed office 2019
- Lieutenant: Ezra DeLodge
- Preceded by: Edwina Butler-Wolfe

Personal details
- Born: Oklahoma, U.S.
- Spouse: Janet Johnson
- Education: Norman High School
- Occupation: Businessman
- Profession: Politician

John Raymond Johnson is Shawnee politician. He is the governor of the Absentee Shawnee Tribe of Indians.

== Early life and education ==
Johnson attended Norman High School.

=== Career ===
Johnson worked in the optometry industry for 35 years. He started his own business in 2004 and eventually retired.

=== Politics ===
In 2019, Johnson became governor of the Absentee Shawnee Tribe of Indians. During his tenure, he seeks to expand business opportunities for the tribe, including securing federal contracting, including partnering with other tribes to execute projects. During his tenure, the tribe broke ground on a new health care center expansion in Little Axe, Oklahoma. He also created a relief fund for tribal members from CARES Act monies, during the height of the COVID-19 pandemic, distributing checks to people in need.

== Personal life ==
Johnson married his wife, Janet, in the late 1970s. They have two children.
