= Benjamin Harjo Jr. =

Native American artist (1945–2023)

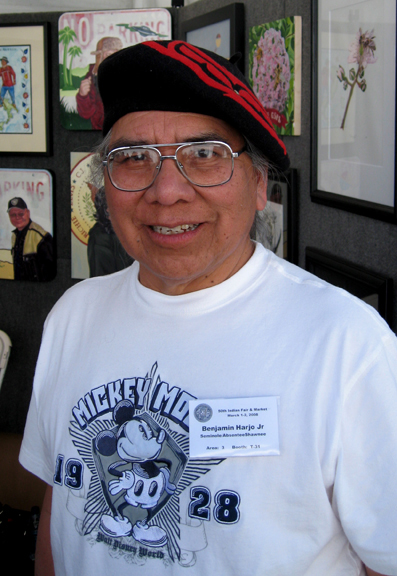
- Harjo at the Heard Museum Fair
- Born: September 19, 1945; Clovis, New Mexico, U.S.
- Died: May 20, 2023 (aged 77); Oklahoma City, Oklahoma, U.S.
- Education: Institute of American Indian Arts
- Alma mater: BFA Oklahoma State University
- Known for: Native American art, American art
- Spouse: Barbara C. Harjo
- Website: benjaminharjojr.com

Benjamin Harjo Jr. (born September 14, 1945 – May 20, 2023) was a Native American painter and printmaker based in Oklahoma.

== Background ==
Benjamin Harjo Jr. was an enrolled citizen of the Absentee Shawnee Tribe of Oklahoma and a descended of the Seminole Nation of Oklahoma. His ancestry was half-Seminole and half-Shawnee. Harjo's father was the late Benjamin Harjo Sr., a full-blood Seminole. Harjo's mother, Viola Harjo, was from Byng, Oklahoma. Her father was William F. Harjo, who graduated from Chilocco Indian School in 1939. His maternal grandparents were Emmett and Ruth Wood.

Harjo Jr. was born on September 19, 1945, in Clovis, New Mexico. After his parents divorced, Viola married Roman Harjo (1924–2006), in 1954 at Clovis; he became the stepfather of Benjamin Jr.

The name Harjo means "crazy" in the Muskogee language, which was spoken by both the Muscogee and the Seminole. The word is part of a military title, Chitto Harjo, meaning "crazy snake".

After his family moved back to Oklahoma, Harjo lived with his maternal grandparents from the age of 10 to 18.

== Education and military service ==
Harjo's first passion was drawing comics, and he sold comics to his high school newspaper. Interested in pursuing a professional career in cartoon animation, Harjo went to the Institute of American Indian Arts in 1966. There he discovered that they had discontinued their animation program at IAIA. He expanded his studies and earned his Associate of Arts degree. His classmates included T. C. Cannon and Linda Lomahaftewa, who have become noted artists. Seymour Tubis was his most influential teacher, and taught him low-tech but highly effective printmaking techniques.

In 1969 Harjo was drafted into the US Army; he served honorably in the Vietnam War from 1969 to 1971.

Upon his release from the military, Harjo continued his art education. He attended Oklahoma State University and graduated with a BFA degree in 1974.

== Style ==
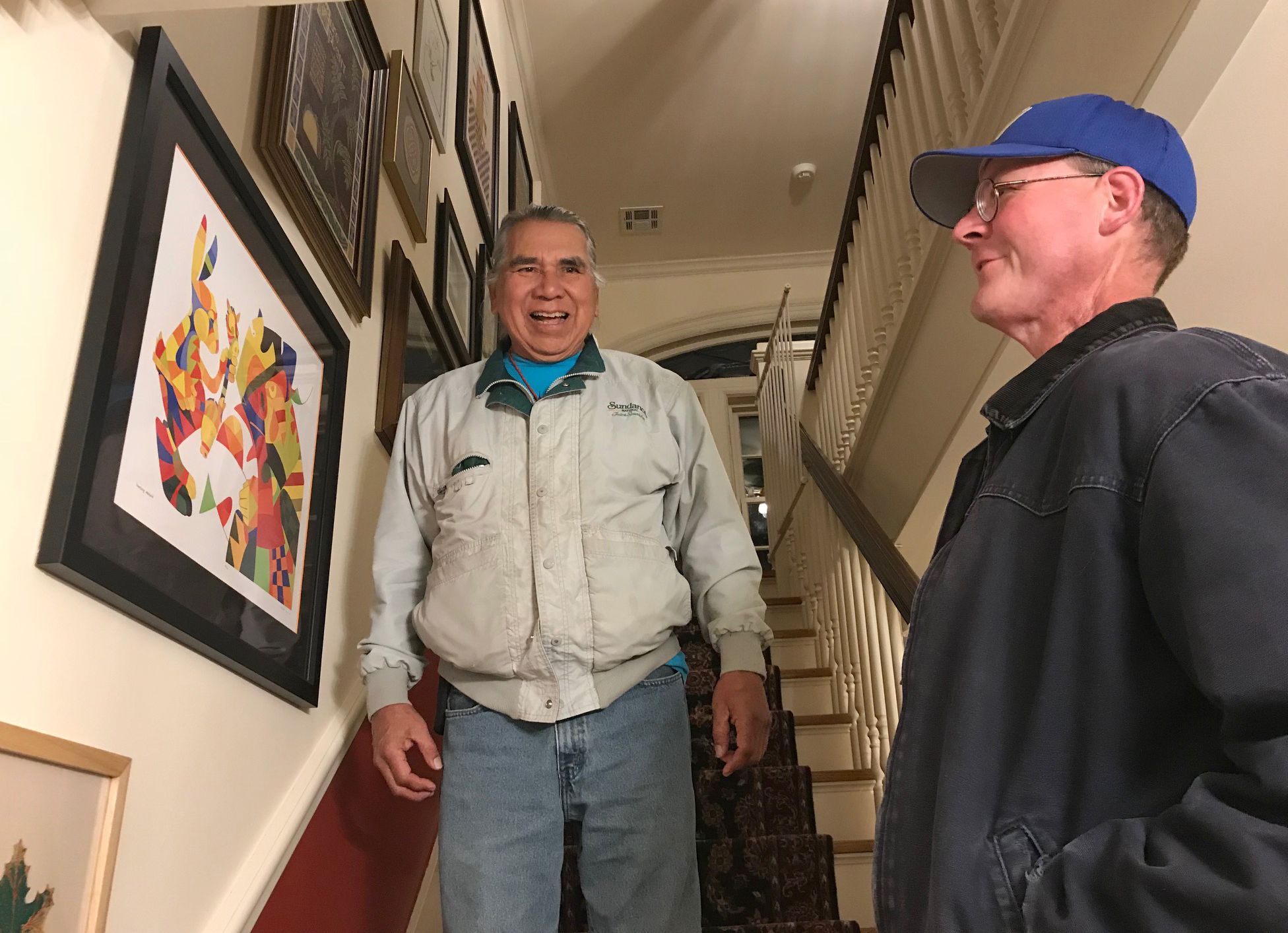
Benjamin Harjo Jr. (Absentee Shawnee/Seminole), artist, shows a painting to art collector Travis D. Day.

Harjo typically painted geometric forms composed of blocks of highly saturated color that form both abstract and highly stylized representational figures. The mosaic nature of his painting is reminiscent of Seminole patchwork clothing. He also worked in pen and ink, allowing his comic influences to show through. Through printmaking, Harjo was able to experiment with texture and subtler palettes. His work is known for its humor, either in comical imagery or in witty titles.

His smallest miniature paintings were not much larger than postage stamp but still featured highly detailed portraits. Harjo's chosen media was gouache on paper but he also used oil, acrylic, watercolor, conté crayons, pencil, pen and ink, pastel, printmaking, and occasionally sculpture.

Harjo said: "When you're traveling down the highway, you see an image whether it's dirt on the back of a truck or a splat on a windshield or two birds sitting by the side of the road picking at something. All those things have inspired me at some point in my creativity."

Harjo summarized his artistic philosophy: "It has always been my contention that one's art speaks from the soul of the artist and remains viable and open to the influences of the artist's environment. Forms, colors, and movement keep it from stagnating and allow it to grow as the artist matures and develops. I feel that my art covers a wide range of emotions, from serious to humorous, and that the colors I used radiate a sense of happiness and joy."

== Personal life and death ==
Benjamin Harjo lived in Oklahoma City with his wife, Barbara C. Harjo, a curator, gardener, and businesswoman.

Harjo died on May 20, 2023, at the age of 77.

== Public collections ==
His artwork can be found in many public collections, including the following:

- Gilcrease Museum, Tulsa, Oklahoma
- Mabee-Gerrer Museum of Art, Shawnee, Oklahoma
- Sam Noble Oklahoma Museum of Natural History, Norman, Oklahoma
- US Embassy, Mogadishu, Somalia
- Sequoyah National Research Center, Little Rock, Arkansas
- Oklahoma State University Museum of Art Stillwater, Oklahoma
- Haskell Cultural Center and Museum, Lawrence, Kansas

== Awards and honors ==
Harjo was the 2005 poster artist for SWAIA's Santa Fe Indian Market. He has consistently worn top awards there, including Best of Show, since 1983.

In 1987 he won the Red Earth Grand Award. He was the 1993 Heard Museum's 34th Annual Featured Artist, the Featured Artist in 1992 and 1993 for the Smithsonian's National Museum of the American Indian's Annual Aspen Benefit, and the Gold Medal Award at the 1990 American Indian Cowboy Artists Wichita Show.

Oklahoma Governor David Walters honored Harjo for his selection by Absolut Vodka to represent Oklahoma in its USA Today advertising campaign.

== Exhibitions ==
- 1992, Franco-American Institute in Rennes, France.
- In 1991, the Wichita Art Museum held a solo exhibition of his work.
- 1991, the Wheelwright Museum of the American Indian hosted a major retrospective of Harjo's work, entitled The Earth, the Moon, and the Stars Above.
- January 2010, solo exhibition at Oklahoma State University: Harjo donated all proceeds of his art sales to OSU's Art Department.
- 2023: Patterns of Knowing at Oklahoma Contemporary in Oklahoma City, three-person exhibition, May 18 – October 23, 2023.
- 2025: The Haskell Cultural Center and Museum held, Chromatic Vibrance, a solo exhibition of his work from June 3 – October 31, 2025.

== Sources ==
- Lester, Patrick D. The Biographical Directory of Native American Painters. Norman: Oklahoma University Press, 1995. ISBN 0-8061-9936-9.
- Little Thunder, Julie Pearson. The Earth, the Moon, and the Stars Above: Benjamin Harjo Jr. Santa Fe: Wheelwright Museum of the American Indian, 2004. ASIN B000KIT8QO.
- McFadden, David Revere and Ellen Napiura Taubman. Changing Hands: Art without Reservation 2: Contemporary Native North American Art from the West, Northwest & Pacific. New York: Museum of Arts and Design, 2005. ISBN 1-890385-11-5.
