= Mardock Mission =

- U.S. National Register of Historic Places
- Location within Oklahoma Location within the United States
- Nearest city: Stella, Oklahoma
- Coordinates: 35°12′39″N 97°9′31″W
- Area: less than one acre
- Built: 1898
- NRHP reference No.: 83002081
- Added to NRHP: March 14, 1983

Mardock Mission was a historic meetinghouse built in 1898 in Mardock, Oklahoma. The mission was listed in the National Register of Historic Places in 1983 for its significance as the only remaining building associated with the Big Jim Band of Absentee Shawnee Indians, the Quaker Missionaries, and a pre-World War I socialist movement. The Absentee Shawnee were so named because in 1845 they had left the rest of the tribe in Kansas and settled along the Canadian River in Indian Territory. Big Jim, (Wapameepto), grandson of Tecumseh, was the chief of the Kispicotha, better known as the Absentee Shawnee. The group numbered 454 in 1904.

The mission building and property were in the Southwest corner of the Northwest Quarter of Section 36, T9N, R1E. The village of Mardock in Cleveland County was just south of the mission for the Absentee Shawnees (Big Jim Band). This village, at one time, consisted of a post office, two stores, and a cotton gin.

In 1897 the Maine Branch of the Women's National Indian Association established a mission at the location. The mission was to serve as a school, religious community and agricultural experiment station for the Indians. Buildings were constructed, an orchard planted and cropland cultivated. In 1898 or 1899 the Mission was transferred to the Associated Executive Committee of Friends who continued to operate the Mission under the direction of John T. Mardock. A Mr. Bohannon deeded the land to Mardock.

The Big Jim Band was relatively non-progressive and although they were receptive to the farming and community activities, they resisted the missionizing efforts. However, the mission persisted and in the early 1900s, began to minister to the growing white population in the nearby community of Mardock. Many activities were centered at the mission: Bible talks, night evangelistic meetings, singing, group recreation and during berry season, berries were harvested and sold. Monthly farmers meetings were held and in 1929 about 35 Indian farmers still attended. The Mission was also an unofficial center for the Jones Family, a group active in the socialist movement during World War I. It is thought that some members participated in the Green Corn Rebellion activities of 1917. Young members were advised to resist the draft.

After 1929 the concentrated mission effort ceased though the mission church building did serve the area white people until about 1955, when the settlement was abandoned. The property was sold to a local farmer who used the church to store hay. Sometime later an independent missionary to the Big Jim Band, Rev. Ted Reynolds, repaired the church and briefly used it.

The church was nominated for inclusion in the National Register of Historic Places in 1982. At that time it was abandoned and was the only remaining building of the original mission property. The Big Jim Mission building was described as a small, single story, weatherboard, frame, T-shaped structure. The roof was gabled, steeply pitched. The central entry was covered with a gable roofed porch with decorative bracketing. Originally the porch roof was cantilevered over the concrete step with support posts later added. A diamond-shaped window was in the front end gable. Single windows were found on four facades and paired windows on three facades. A single brick exterior chimney stack was on the east elevation. Dense shrubs and numerous trees closely surrounded the building. Exterior alterations included partial filling of two windows.
