= Laban J. Miles =

American Indian agent

Major Laban J. Miles
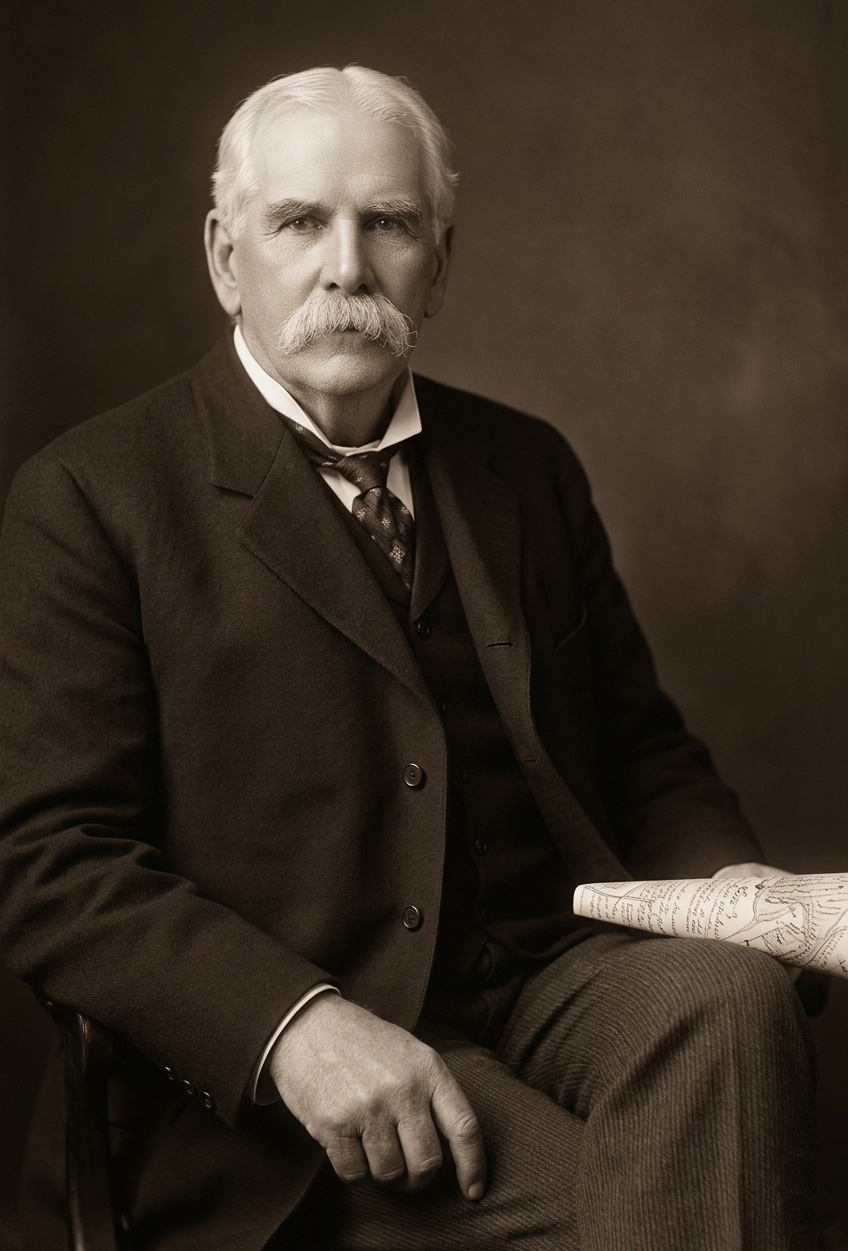
- Born: March 10, 1844; Ludlow Falls, Ohio
- Died: April 12, 1931 (aged 87); Pawhuska, Oklahoma

Laban J. Miles (March 10, 1844– April 12, 1931) was an American Indian agent at the Osage Agency for the Osage Nation and Kaw people.

== Early life and family ==
Major Laban J. Miles was born at Ludlow Falls, Ohio, March 10, 1844, to Benjamin and Prudence (Jones) Miles. He was raised a Quaker and on April 27, 1870, in West Branch, Cedar County, Iowa he married Agnes Randall Minthorn and together they had six children, Maude, Harriet, Theodore, Blanche, Oakley and Laura. In 1882, Laban Miles' nephew Herbert Hoover came to stay for a year with his family at the Osage Agency. Laban's wife, Agnes Randall (Minthorn) Miles was a sister of Huldah Randall (Minthorn) Hoover.
Laban's parents went to work at the Osage Agency for three years in 1873, Benjamin as Superintendent and Prudence as Matron of the Government School there. In 1878, they returned to their positions at the Osage Agency for another five years. In January 1883, Benjamin Miles established a Government Indian School at West Branch, Cedar county, Iowa. A year later he moved the school to Lee County, Iowa and transferred the school to the Trustees of White's Manual labor Institute.

== Indian agent ==
On June 24, 1878, Major Laban J. Miles was appointed by President Rutherford B. Hayes as an Indian Agent for the Osage and Kaw Tribes replacing Cyrus Beede. Major Laban J. Miles resigned on May 20, 1885, but on April 19, 1889, Miles was reappointed Superintendent of the Osage Agency and held that office until July 4, 1893.

== Death ==
Laban J. Miles died at his home in Pawhuska, Oklahoma, on April 12, 1931.

== Notes ==
"Wah'kon-tah: The Osage and the White Man's Road" by John Joseph Mathews, University of Oklahoma Press, 1932 was written using Major Laban J. Miles' journal as reference.

National Historic Site Laban Miles House
