= George Bingenheimer =

American investor and collector (1861–1920)

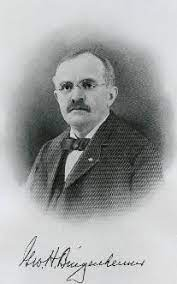
- Bingenheimer in 1885
- Born: George Henry Bingenheimer; April 18, 1861; Frankfort, Minnesota
- Died: December 24, 1920 (aged 59); Minneapolis, Minnesota

George Henry Bingenheimer (April 18, 1861 — December 24, 1920) was an early settler, drug store owner, and land developer for the city of Mandan, North Dakota. Active in local politics, he served as Morton County Treasurer (1882–1886), Sheriff (1889–1894), and as an Indian agent for Standing Rock from 1898–1903. Bingenheimer was an avid collector of Native American art and artifacts, and his extensive collection helped form the basis for the Smithsonian's National Museum of the American Indian.

== Early life ==
George Bingenheimer was born on April 18, 1861, in Frankfort, Minnesota. His parents, Jacob and Margaret Bingenheimer, had nine children. George was the fifth oldest among them. The other siblings had moved to Minnesota from Hesse, in central Germany, in 1849. Jacob Bingenheimer, George's father, later became one of the foremost flour millers in Minneapolis. In March 1880, George Bingenheimer arrived in Mandan, followed a year later by his brother Ferdinand. George initially worked at William Hollenback's drug store, but in October 1881, he and Ferdinand joined forces and established their own drug store, which was Mandan's first drug store. Eventually, they sold the store to D.R. Taylor, who remained in the business and is known as Taylor Drug today.

== Political career ==
George Bingenheimer was also involved in politics and attended multiple National Republican Conventions. He was chosen as the County Treasurer in 1882 and held the position until 1886. In 1885, he campaigned against the idea of western Morton County residents separating to create a new county. George Bingenheimer was a stockholder of the Pioneer Publishing Company. The Pioneer Publishing Co. was one of the first news companies established west of Missouri River.

== Standing Rock ==
George Bingenheimer took over Major Cramsie's position, as Indian agent at Standing Rock on March 11, 1898, and served there for the following five years. He served as an Indian Agent at Fort Yates in Standing Rock. George Bingenheimer later faced accusations of serving under the suspicion of revenue misappropriation, and ultimately left the Indian service because of so. He was later cleared of these charges. He proceeded to leave Standing Rock, however, the "Major" along with his name, stuck with Bingenheimer.

== Later life ==
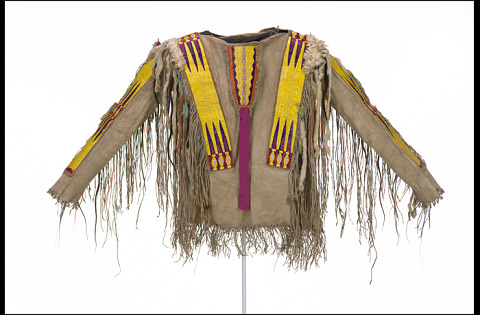
Men's shirt, Northern Plains, made of "hide, porcupine quills, feathers, horsehair, human hair, silk ribbon, rabbit skin/fur, weasel skin/fur, and metal items" and created by sewing, dying, quill plaiting or woven quillwork, and fringing (National Museum of the American Indian)

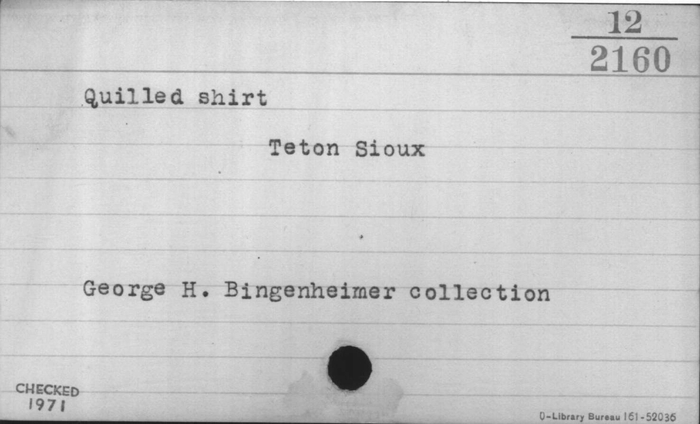
Original card catalog record for the shirt, attributing it to the Teton Sioux and the collection to George H. Bingenheimer (National Museum of the American Indian)

George then went on to marry Margaret Bowers, who was a Mandan school teacher. They bought their home, which is known as the Weigel Funeral Home today, originally in 1907. Bingenheimer was also a huge collector of Native American artifacts and memorabilia and goods. He started growing his collection from the time he started working at Standing Rock until many years after. He donated and sold portions of his collections to the State Historical Society of North Dakota in 1906. George and Margaret left Mandan in 1916 to Miles City, Montana. One of his possible contributions is a carved, wooden bow, which is now at the Smithsonian National Museum of the American Indian. Items that Bingenheimer possibly collected consisted of the "Button Buzzer", which was a type of toy or game created for children, and other types of clothing/garments and accessories.

Bingenheimer died in Minneapolis on December 24, 1920.

== Other important contributions ==
George Bingenheimer was also a Federal Marshal around the late 1890s. He was the builder of the Mandan Library and Mandan Hospital, which contributed greatly to the lives of the people living in the growing city. Bingenheimer sold a portion of his Plains Indian collection of art and artifacts to the North Dakota Museum, and the rest of his collection was acquired by the Smithsonian Institution.
