= David John Mosher Wood =

Indo-American agent and Methodist minister

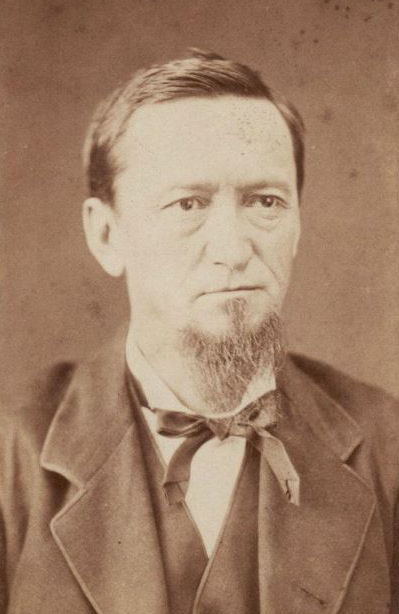
- Born: March 1, 1840 Mount Gilead, Ohio
- Died: August 16, 1918 (aged 78) Stillwater, Payne County, Oklahoma

David John Mosher Wood (March 4, 1840 – August 16, 1918) was an American Indian agent and Methodist minister.

He served in the military during the Civil War, was a Methodist minister and Indian agent appointed by President Benjamin Harrison.

== Early life and family ==
Wood was born at Mount Gilead, Ohio, March 1, 1840, eleventh child to David and Esther Ward (Mosher) Wood. He was a brother to Samuel Newitt Wood and Stephen Mosher Wood. On September 23, 1860, David was married to Eliza Mary Johnson, daughter of Jonathan Joshua Johnson and Joanna Cobb of Marion County, Ohio. She was born in Columbiana County, Ohio, December 27, 1840. David and Eliza then moved to Marion County, Ohio. On March 6, 1861, Eliza Mary Johnson was listed as married contrary to discipline in the Mount Gilead Monthly Meeting records. The Wood family were members of the Alum Creek Monthly Meeting. On February 12, 1862, their first son, Willie O. Wood, was born at Mahaska County, Iowa; he died the same day. On April 7, 1863, their second son, Samuel Newitt Wood, was born in Morrow County, Ohio. On December 11, 1863, their son Samuel N. Wood died at Leavenworth, Kansas. On September 8, 1864, their first daughter, Lula May Wood, was born at Paola, Miami County, Kansas. On October 1, 1870, their third son, John Berta "Berty" Wood, was born. On November 5, 1874, John "Berty" Wood died and was buried in Otter Creek Cemetery at Liberty Center, Warren County, Iowa. On April 27, 1880, their fourth son, Rolla Burton Wood, was born. On June 6, 1906, David John Mosher Wood was married to Adeline Mary (Snider) Reynolds; she was previously married to Norman Henry Reynolds.

== Military career ==
Wood's service in the Civil War began as a private in Co. D, 33rd Iowa Volunteer Infantry Regiment, he took part in the Battle of Newtonia in Newton County, Missouri. He was discharged from the 33rd on March 28, 1863, for promotion to full 2nd lieutenant in Company B., 15th Regiment Kansas Volunteer Cavalry. On October 19, 1864, Wood took part in the Battle of Lexington, in Lafayette County, Missouri. General Sterling Price’s forces collided with Union scouts and drove them back and engaged General James G. Blunt’s forces. The Union forces had to retreat to a defensive position near Little Blue River. On October 21, 1864, Wood took part in the Battle of Little Blue River. On October 22 and 23, 1864, Wood took part in the Battle of Byram's Ford, also known as the Battle of the Big Blue River, which was part of the larger Battle of Westport. On October 23, 1864, Wood took part in the Battle of Westport. On October 28, 1864, Wood took part in the Second Battle of Newtonia; General Sterling Price’s confederate cavalry force was in retreat after the previous defeat and had stopped to rest two miles south of Newtonia. They were spotted by General James G. Blunt’s Union cavalrymen, McLain’s Colorado light Artillery, supported by the 15th Kansas Cavalry opened on the rebels. It was a Union victory and Price fled into Indian Territory.

== Indian agent ==
On July 18, 1889, Wood was commissioned and appointed by President Benjamin Harrison to be agent for the Indians of the Ponca, Pawnee, Otoe, and Oakland Agency, in the Indian Territory replacing Elihu C. Osborne. These were four separate tribes; the Ponca, the Pawnee, the Tonkawa and the confederated tribe of Otoes and Missouria and had essentially four separate subagencies with their own individual government and business affairs. So Wood and family moved to Stillwater, Payne County, Oklahoma. On June 18, 1893, Wood was replaced by James P. Woolsey of Rogers, Arkansas, appointed by Grover Cleveland.

== Methodist Minister ==
On September 11, 1887, Wood was sent as a Methodist Episcopal Church missionary from the Des Moines conference to the Indian territory and was stationed at Catoosa in the Cherokee nation. On January 1, 1888, Wood assumed the duties in the Tulsa church until a permanent preacher could be assigned. On March 10, 1888, Wood attended the South Kansas Conference of the M. E. Church, where Bishop Bowman announced his transfer from the Des Moines, Iowa conference. It was around this time that he moved to the Pawnee reservation as a missionary. On October 18, 1888, the eighth conference of the Methodist Episcopal Church met at Catoosa, Oklahoma, where Wood was made superintendent of the territory south and west of Arkansas River and Pawhuska. On March 21–26, 1889, there was a Methodist Indian Mission Conference held in Tulsa, Oklahoma. Wood was appointed for the Pawnees. Sometime in 1892, Wood was admitted to the Oklahoma Conference of the Methodist Episcopal Church. On December 13, 1900, Wood and family moved to Glencoe, where Wood had accepted the position of pastor at the Glencoe M. E. Church.

== Death ==
On August 16, 1918, Wood died at Stillwater, Payne County, Oklahoma. He died at the home of his son, Rolla Wood. Brief funeral services were held at the house Sunday morning, conducted by Rev. E. V. DuBios, pastor of the First Methodist church, assisted by the Rev. Adolphus Carrion of Pawnee, full-blooded Sioux.

== Notes ==
David's brother, Joseph Mosher Wood, was a delegate from the Baltimore Yearly Meeting of the Society of Friends that petitioned President Ulysses S. Grant to take a more gentle approach with the American Indians. This led to Grant's Peace Policy in which he appointed members of the Society as Indian agents.
