= Absentee Shawnee Tribe of Indians =

American Indian tribe in Oklahoma, United States

Absentee Shawnee Tribe of Indians of Oklahoma
- official tribal flag

Total population
- 4,675 (2024)

Regions with significant populations
- United States ( Oklahoma)

Languages
- Shawnee, English, Yuchi

Religion
- Christianity, Native American Church, traditional tribal religion

Related ethnic groups
- Eastern Shawnee Tribe of Oklahoma, Shawnee Tribe, and Sac and Fox

The Absentee Shawnee Tribe of Indians of Oklahoma (or Absentee Shawnee) is one of three federally recognized tribes of Shawnee people. Historically residing in what became organized as the upper part of the Eastern United States, the original Shawnee lived in the large territory now made up of Pennsylvania, Kentucky, Tennessee, Ohio, Indiana, Illinois, and neighboring states. In total, they occupied and traveled through lands ranging from Canada to Florida, and from the Mississippi River to the eastern continental coast.

After Indian Removal, most of the people settled in Indian Territory (now the state of Oklahoma). In 1936, the Absentee Shawnee Tribe reorganized their government and became federally recognized. Their headquarters is in Shawnee, Oklahoma. Their tribal jurisdictional area includes land in Oklahoma in both Cleveland and Pottawatomie counties. The other federally recognized tribes are the Shawnee Tribe and the Eastern Shawnee Tribe of Oklahoma.

== Citizenship ==
There are 4,675 enrolled Absentee Shawnee tribal citizens as of June 30, 2024. Approximately 74% of citizens lived in Oklahoma as of 2020. Tribal enrollment is based on blood quantum criteria, with applicants required to have a minimum of one-eighth (1/8) documented Absentee-Shawnee blood to be accepted as citizens, as established by the tribal constitution. Though it is not a formal division, there is a social separation between two major groups of the tribe, based on different histories of their ancestors. Descendants of the traditionalist Big Jim Band have kept cultural traditions and ceremonies; they have their primary community in the Little Axe, or Norman area. The White Turkey Band historically had assimilated more, adopting cultural ways of the European-American majority. Today many of its families are based in the Shawnee area. Regardless of historical viewpoints, the bands cooperate for the future of the tribe.

== Locations and properties ==
The tribe operates its own housing authority and issues tribal vehicle tags. It owns a gas station, two smoke shops, two casinos, and the AST Health Center and Plus Care, in Norman or Shawnee, Oklahoma. Its casinos, both called Thunderbird Casino, are east of Norman, near the tribal headquarters in Shawnee. As of 2017, the tribe's economic impact is over $145 million. The tribe has 1,130 paid positions and paid $55 million to workers.

== Government ==
Map of Absentee Shawnee Tribe of Indians of Oklahoma's tribal jurisdictional area (OTSA) and nearby jurisdiction areas. Shared with the Citizen Potawatomi Nation.

The Absentee Shawnee Tribe has all the inherent powers of sovereignty held prior to the Constitution of the United States. Such powers include adopting and operating a form of government of its choosing, defining the conditions of tribal enrollment, regulating domestic relations of its citizens, levying taxes, regulating property within its jurisdiction, and controlling the conduct of citizens by legislation and a justice system.

Its chosen form of government evolved over the first half of the 20th century. In 1938, the current government was formalized under a constitution written to provide statutory authority. The current constitution was ratified on December 5, 1938, and it was last amended on August 13, 1988.

The tribal government is composed of two separate branches: the legislative/executive branch (also referred to as Executive Committee) and the judicial branch. In addition, an independent body, the 'Election Committee,' conducts annual elections.

The legislative/executive branch has five members, all elected at-large: Governor, Lieutenant, Secretary, Treasurer, and Representative. Terms are four years. The Executive Committee sets policy, administers government programs, and executes the will of the tribal membership.

The current administration includes the following:

- Governor: John Raymond Johnson
- Lieutenant Governor: Diane Ponkilla
- Secretary: Misty McGirt
- Treasurer: Joseph Blanchard
- Representative: Anthony Johnson

== History ==
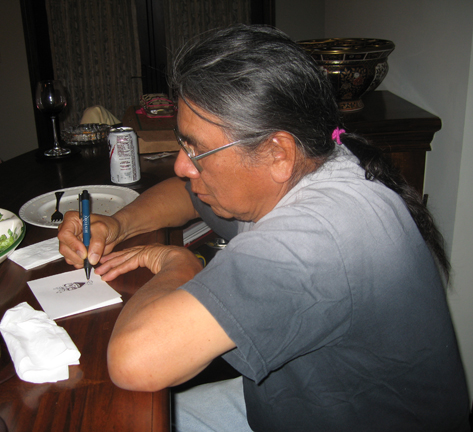
Absentee Shawnee enrolled member, artist Benjamin Harjo, Jr. sketching

The Shawnee are an Algonquian-speaking people, and at the time of European encounter, they had bands living in present-day Eastern United States and parts of the Southeastern United States.

During the American Revolutionary War, many Shawnee moved from the area later defined as the Northwest Territory near the Great Lakes to Cape Girardeau, Missouri; some later moved into Spanish Louisiana. These bands were later joined by other Shawnee groups from Alabama. Some relocated southward into Arkansas Territory, Spanish Texas, and French Louisiana after the 1803 Louisiana Purchase by the United States of former French-controlled lands west of the Mississippi River. Due to encroaching European-American settlement, the Shawnee in Missouri negotiated an 1825 treaty, ceding their Missouri lands for reservations in Kansas.

However, prior to the treaty, a group of Shawnee (later known as the Big Jim band) had already left the region to migrate to Texas Territory, then controlled by Spain. Collectively, the band would become known as Absentee Shawnee, as they were referred to as such in the provisional clause of an 1854 treaty regarding Kansas reservation lands. Later, the Texas-Mexico War compelled numerous Absentee Shawnee to leave Texas Territory and to relocate into Indian Territory of Oklahoma. Historians believe that other Shawnee bands, also once in Kansas, had already resettled in Indian Territory beginning around 1839, the year that the Cherokee Nation were removed from the Southeast to this territory.

In the late 19th century, an Indian Agent of the US government brought soldiers from Fort Reno to force the traditionalist Big Jim band of Absentee Shawnees out of the Deep Fork River area, southward to Hog Creek and Little River area near present-day Lake Thunderbird, Norman. Their descendants, federally recognized since 1936 as the Absentee Shawnee Tribe of Oklahoma, continued to live here, in communities now called Little Axe, and Shawnee.

In 1872, the US Congress gave the Absentee Shawnee title to shared lands occupied on the Citizen Potawatomi Nation-Absentee Shawnee Oklahoma Tribal Statistical Area (OTSA). In the late 19th century, the communal land was allotted to individual households in an effort to force the tribes to adopt subsistence farming and assimilate to mainstream European-American ways. They lost control of considerable land in the process.

In 1936, the tribe reorganized and gained federal recognition as the Absentee Shawnee Tribe of Oklahoma under the new Oklahoma Indian Welfare Act, with the current constitution ratified on December 5, 1938.

== Language ==
Since the early 21st century, the tribe has created the Cultural Preservation Department to support cultural and language preservation. They offer a Shawnee language class and immersion program for children. According to the Intertribal Wordpath Society, as of 2006, some 200 to 800 people still spoke the Shawnee language in Oklahoma. Pauline Wahpepah, a fluent native speaker, teaches Shawnee for the tribe.

George Blanchard, Sr, Governor of the Absentee Shawnee from 2009 to 2013, has more recently also been working on language programs and teaching both children and adults. Since 2014 he has worked as a language specialist at the Eastern Shawnee Cultural Preservation Department in Seneca, Missouri, near the Oklahoma border. He grew up speaking Shawnee and did not learn English until he was five years old. At Seneca, he teaches Headstart and elementary grade classes, as well as adults two evenings a week, to encourage families to use Shawnee at home. Since the early 21st century, he has also provided translations and language coaching on TV projects, such as Ric Burns’s 2009 PBS series We Shall Remain and the 2018 History Channel documentary series Frontiersmen.

== Flag and emblem ==
The official emblem was designed by Leroy White (October 4, 1928 – July 25, 2002), a great-grandson of Big Jim and direct descendant of Chief Tecumseh. His work was selected in a 1974 competition sponsored by the Absentee Shawnee for a tribal logo.

White said about his design:

- The yellow moon in the background represents one of God's many creations, which were always admired by Indian people.
- The two feathers symbolize two significant leaders of Shawnee people, Tecumseh and his brother, Tenskwatawa, the Prophet.
- The facial profile represents Tecumseh, a Shawnee leader revered for his strength of character and military accomplishments. Much of his adult life was dedicated to uniting the eastern tribes into an Indian confederacy to assert and defend their right to live in their native lands under their own laws and leaders. While he did not get to realize his dream, his spirit was never broken.
- The two stars denote the rank of brigadier general held by Tecumseh in the British Army. He died in action at the Battle of the Thames in 1813.
- Lastly, Li Si Wi Nwi was the chosen name of the Little Axe community of Absentee Shawnee, and its English translation is "Among the Shawnee."

Leroy White was born and raised in Little Axe, Oklahoma, on land allotted to his family in 1886, in the break-up of communal tribal lands. White was immersed from birth in the Shawnee language and traditions. In 1976 he was selected to succeed his uncle, Webster Little Jim, as the traditional chief of the Big Jim band of Absentee Shawnee Tribe. His interests included painting. In 1974, with the encouragement of his family, White had entered the contest sponsored by the Absentee Shawnee Tribe for design of a tribal logo. He included what he believed are the most important symbols to the Absentee Shawnee people. White won the contest, and his design was adopted as the official emblem of the Absentee Shawnee Tribe.

== Notable Absentee Shawnee ==
- Benjamin Harjo, Jr. (1945-2023), painter and printmaker
- Ernest Spybuck (1883–1949), artist and cultural historian
- Foster Hood (1923-2008), artist and actor

Preceded by Edwina Butler-Wolfe	Absentee Shawnee Tribal Governor; 2013–Present	Succeeded by John Johnson

== See also ==
- Shawnee language
- Stomp dance
