= Falter (disambiguation) =

Falter is an Austrian weekly news magazine.

Falter may also refer to:

- Falter (book), a non-fiction book by Bill McKibben

people with the surname:

- Arthur R. Falter (1906–1979), American politician from Illinois
- Bailey Falter (born 1997), American baseball player
- John Falter (1910–1982), American artist
- Jürgen W. Falter (born 1944), German political scientist
- Martin Falter (born 1983), Czech ice hockey player
- Vincent Falter (born 1932), retired U.S. Army major general
