= Shawnee =

Indigenous peoples of the Midwestern United States

Šaawano (singular), Šaawanooaki (plural)
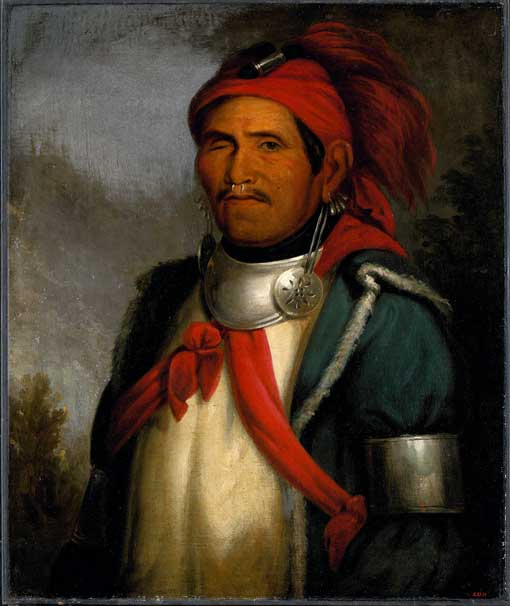
- The Shawnee Prophet, Tenskwatawa (1775–1836), c. 1820, portrait by Charles Bird King

Total population
- 7,584 enrolled

Regions with significant populations
- United States (Oklahoma), formerly Ohio, Pennsylvania, Indiana, and surrounding states

Languages
- Shawnee, English

Religion
- Indigenous religions

Related ethnic groups
- Miami, Menominee, Cheyenne

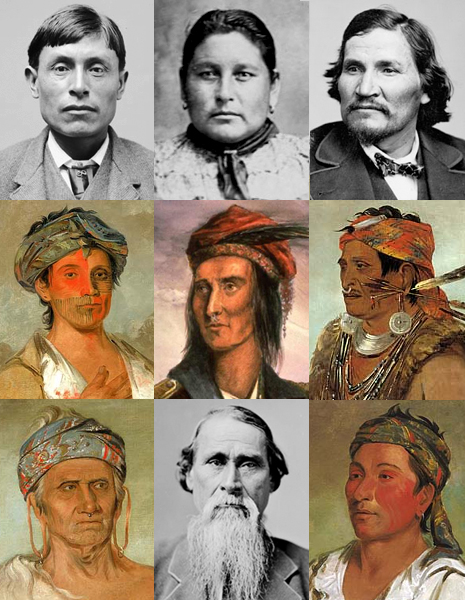
A collage of Shawnee people

The Shawnee (/ʃɔːˈni/ shaw-NEE) are a Native American people of the Northeastern Woodlands. Their language, Shawnee, is an Algonquian language.

The Shawnee precontact homeland was likely centered in southern Ohio. In the 17th century, they dispersed throughout Ohio, Illinois, Maryland, Delaware, and Pennsylvania. In the early 18th century, they were primarily concentrated in eastern Pennsylvania but later that century dispersed again across Pennsylvania, West Virginia, Kentucky, Ohio, Indiana, and Illinois, with a small group joining the Muscogee people in Alabama.

The Shawnee fought many wars to attempt to stay in their ancestral homelands, first against the British in the French and Indian War (1754–1763), Pontiac's War (1763), and Lord Dunmore's War (1774), then against the Americans in the American Revolutionary War (1775–1783), the Northwest Indian War (1786–1795), and Tecumseh's War and the War of 1812 (1810–1815). After the death of Tecumseh and the end of the War of 1812, the Shawnee signed several treaties ceding land to the U.S. federal government. The U.S. finally removed them under the 1830 Indian Removal Act to areas west of the Mississippi River; these lands would later become the states of Missouri, Kansas, and Texas. They were subsequently removed again to Indian Territory, which became the state of Oklahoma in the early 20th century.

Today, Shawnee people are enrolled in three federally recognized tribes: the Absentee-Shawnee Tribe of Indians of Oklahoma, Eastern Shawnee Tribe of Oklahoma, and Shawnee Tribe, all headquartered in Oklahoma.

== Shawnee Etymology ==
Shawnee has also been written as Shaawana and Shawanese. Individuals and singular Shawnee tribes may be referred to as šaawanwa, while the collective Shawnee people may be referred to as šaawanwaki or šaawanooki.

Algonquian languages include words similar to the archaic shawano (now: shaawanwa), meaning "south". However, the stem šawa- does not mean "south" in Shawnee, but rather "moderate, warm (of weather)": See Charles F. Voegelin, "šawa (plus -ni, -te) Moderate, Warm. Cp. šawani 'it is moderating...". In one Shawnee tale, "Sawage" (šaawaki) is the deity of the south wind. Jeremiah Curtin translates Sawage as 'it thaws', referring to the warm weather of the south. In an account and a song collected by C. F. Voegelin, šaawaki is attested as the spirit of the South, or the South Wind.

== Language ==
The Shawnee language is known as saawanwaatoweewe. In 2002, the Shawnee language, a part of the Algonquian family, was in decline but was still spoken by approximately 200 people. These included more than 100 Absentee Shawnee and 12 Shawnee Tribe speakers. By 2017, Shawnee language advocates, including tribal member George Blanchard, estimated that there were fewer than 100 speakers. Most fluent Shawnee speakers are over the age of 50.

The language is written in the Latin script, but attempts to create a unified spelling system have been unsuccessful. The Shawnee language has a dictionary, and portions of the Bible have been translated into Shawnee.

== History ==
=== Precontact history ===
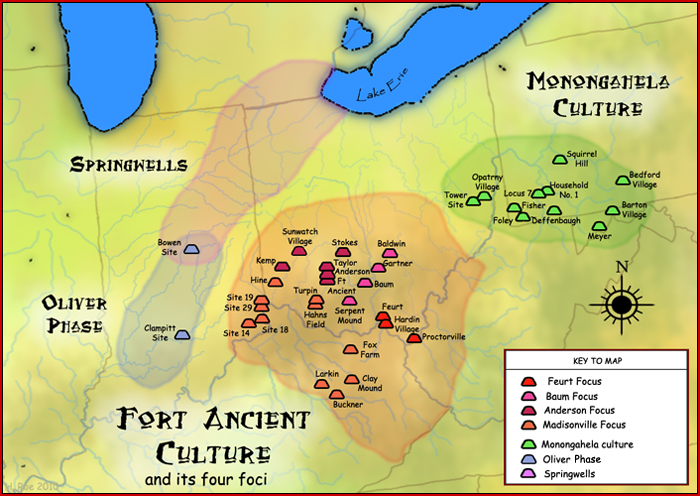
Fort Ancient Monongahela cultures

Some scholars have proposed that the Shawnee descend from the precontact Fort Ancient culture of the Ohio region, although this interpretation is not universally accepted. Other scholars suggest that the Shawnee entered the region at a later period and subsequently occupied Fort Ancient sites.

Fort Ancient culture flourished from c. 1000 to c. 1650 CE among populations that predominantly inhabited lands along both sides of the Ohio River in areas corresponding to present-day southern Ohio, northern Kentucky, and western West Virginia. Like contemporaneous Mississippian culture societies, Fort Ancient peoples constructed earthwork mounds as integral components of their religious, social, and political systems. Fort Ancient culture was once interpreted as a regional manifestation of Mississippian cultural influence; however, scholars now generally conclude that Fort Ancient culture (1000–1650 CE) developed primarily from the earlier Hopewell culture (100 BCE–500 CE). The Hopewell peoples likewise constructed mounds as central elements of their social, political, and religious organization. Among their most prominent monuments are large earthwork effigy mounds, including Serpent Mound in present-day Ohio.

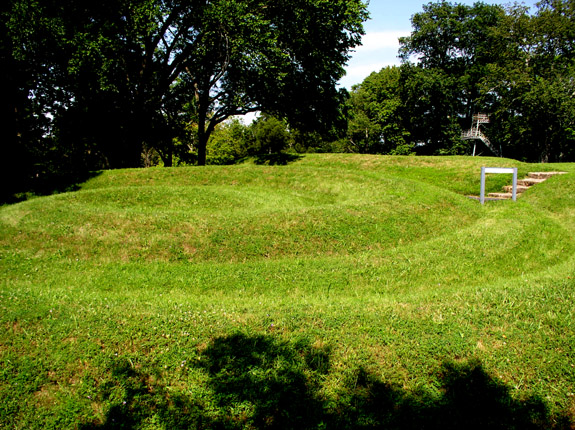
Serpent Mound, Peebles, Ohio

The ultimate fate of the Fort Ancient peoples remains uncertain. It is widely thought that their society, like that of Mississippian cultures farther south, was profoundly disrupted by successive waves of epidemic disease introduced through early contact with Spanish explorers during the 16th century. Archaeological evidence from the period after 1525 at the Madisonville site, the type site, indicates that village house sizes became smaller and less numerous. Additional findings suggest a departure from a previously "horticulture-centered, sedentary way of life".

A gap exists in the archaeological record between the most recent Fort Ancient sites and the earliest sites associated with the historic Shawnee. The latter were documented by European (French and English) archaeologists as occupying the region at the time of sustained contact. Scholars generally accept that similarities in material culture, artistic traditions, mythology, and Shawnee oral histories linking them to Fort Ancient peoples support the possibility of a cultural and historical connection between Fort Ancient society and the historical Shawnee. At the same time, evidence and oral traditions also associate Siouan-speaking nations with the Ohio Valley, reflecting the region's complex and multiethnic history.

The Shawnee regarded the Lenape (or Delaware) of the Mid-Atlantic region along the East Coast as their "grandfathers," reflecting a perceived ancestral relationship. Other Algonquian nations—particularly those in present-day Canada extending inland along the St. Lawrence River and around the Great Lakes—considered the Shawnee to represent their southernmost branch. Along the Atlantic seaboard, Algonquian-speaking tribes were historically concentrated primarily in coastal regions, extending from present-day Quebec southward to the Carolinas.

=== 17th century ===
Europeans reported encountering the Shawnee across a wide geographic area. One of the earliest possible references to the Shawnee appears on a 1614 Dutch map depicting a group identified as Sawwanew located just east of the Delaware River. Later 17th-century Dutch sources also place them in this general region. Accounts by French explorers from the same century more commonly situated the Shawnee along the Ohio River, where they were encountered during French expeditions originating from eastern Canada and the Illinois Country.

Based on historical accounts and later archaeological evidence, John E. Kleber describes Shawnee towns as follows:

"A Shawnee town might have from forty to one hundred bark-covered houses similar in construction to Haudenosaunee longhouses. Each village usually had a meeting house or council house, perhaps sixty to ninety feet long, where public deliberations took place."

According to English colonial legend, some Shawnee were believed to descend from a party sent by Chief Opechancanough, ruler of the Powhatan Confederacy from 1618 to 1644, to settle in the Shenandoah Valley. This party was reportedly led by his son, Sheewa-a-nee. Edward Bland, an explorer who accompanied Abraham Wood's expedition in 1650, wrote that during Opechancanough's lifetime there had been a conflict between a Chawan chief and a weroance of the Powhatan, who was also a relative of Opechancanough's family. Bland stated that the latter had murdered the former. The Shawnee were later "driven from Kentucky in the 1670s by the Haudenosaunee of Pennsylvania and New York, who claimed the Ohio valley as hunting ground to supply its fur trade. In 1671, the colonists Batts and Fallam reported that the Shawnee were contesting control of the Shenandoah Valley with the Haudenosaunee Confederacy (Iroquois) and were losing that contest.

Sometime prior to 1670, a group of Shawnee migrated to the Savannah River region. These Shawnee made contact with English colonists based in Charles Town, South Carolina, in 1674, and the two groups formed a long-lasting alliance. The Savannah River Shawnee became known to the Carolina English as the "Savannah Indians." At roughly the same time, other Shawnee groups migrated to Florida, Maryland, Pennsylvania, and additional regions south and east of the Ohio country. Pierre Le Moyne d'Iberville, founder of New Orleans and the French colony of La Louisiane, wrote in his journal in 1699 that the Shawnee (whom he spelled Chaouenons) were "the single nation to fear, being spread out over Carolina and Virginia in the direction of the Mississippi."

Historian Alan Gallay has suggested that Shawnee migrations during the mid-to-late 17th century were likely driven by the Beaver Wars, which began in the 1640s. During this period, nations of the Haudenosaunee Confederacy advanced westward to secure the Ohio Valley as hunting territory. The Shawnee became known for their extensive network of settlements, which stretched from Pennsylvania to Illinois and southward to Georgia. Among their documented villages were Eskippakithiki in Kentucky; Sonnionto (also known as Lower Shawneetown) in Ohio; Chalakagay near present-day Sylacauga, Alabama, Chalahgawtha at the site of modern Chillicothe, Ohio; Old Shawneetown, Illinois; and Suwanee, Georgia. Their language became a lingua franca for trade among numerous tribes, and the Shawnee emerged as influential leaders, initiating and sustaining intertribal resistance to European and Euro-American expansion.

=== 18th century ===
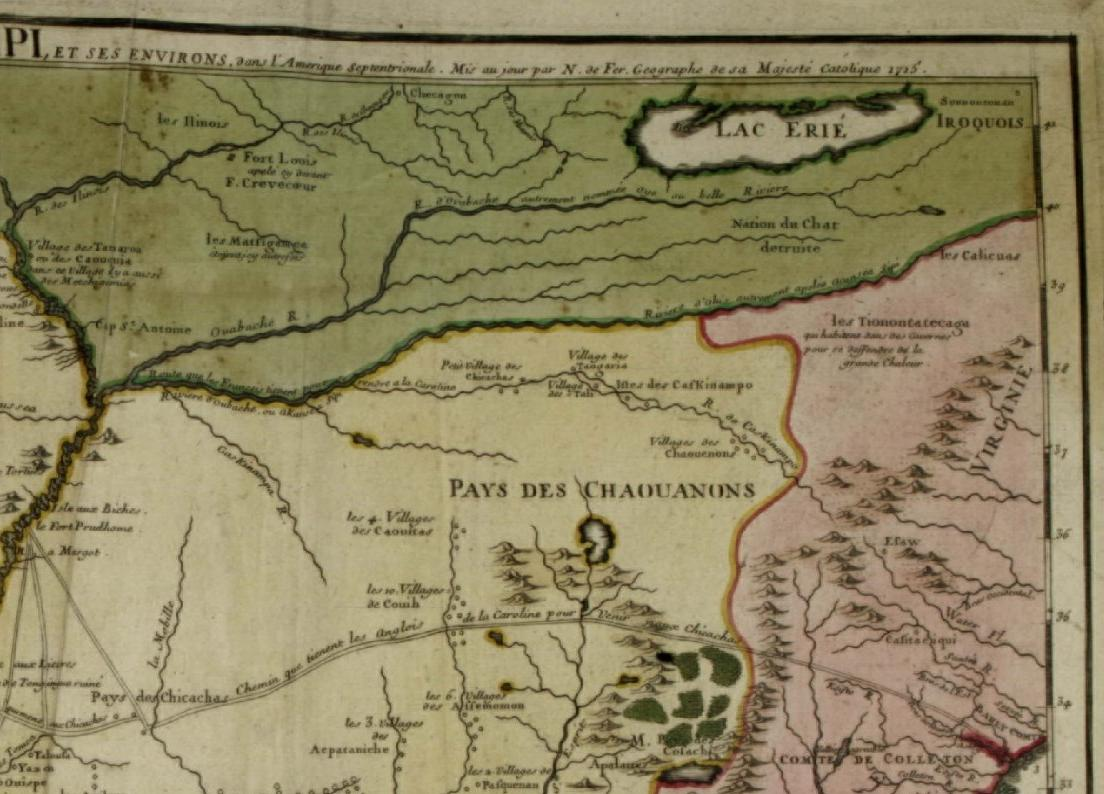
1715 map showing the land of the "Chaouanons" (Shawnee)

Some Shawnee occupied areas of central Pennsylvania. Having long been without a recognized chief, they requested in 1714 that Carondawana, an Oneida war chief, represent them before the Pennsylvania provincial council. Around 1727, Carondawana and his wife, a prominent interpreter known as Madame Montour, settled at Otstonwakin, located on the west bank at the confluence of Loyalsock Creek and the West Branch Susquehanna River.

By 1730, European American settlers had begun to arrive in the Shenandoah Valley of Virginia, where the Shawnee predominated in the northern portion of the valley. They were claimed as tributaries by the Haudenosaunee, or Six Nations of the Iroquois, to the north. The Haudenosaunee assisted some of the Tuscarora people from North Carolina—who were also Iroquoian speakers and distant relations—in resettling near what is now Martinsburg, West Virginia. Most of the Tuscarora migrated to New York and settled near the Oneida, becoming the sixth nation of the Haudenosaunee Confederacy; they declared their migration complete in 1722. During this same period, Seneca and Lenape war parties from the north frequently fought pitched battles with pursuing bands of Catawba from Virginia, who overtook them in Shawnee-inhabited regions of the valley.

By the late 1730s, increasing pressure from colonial expansion produced repeated conflicts. Shawnee communities were also affected by the expanding fur trade. While access to arms and European goods increased, the trade also introduced rum and brandy, contributing to serious social problems related to alcohol abuse. Several Shawnee communities in the Province of Pennsylvania, led by Peter Chartier, a Métis trader, opposed the sale of alcohol within their settlements. This opposition brought them into conflict with colonial governor Patrick Gordon, who faced pressure from traders to permit the sale of rum and brandy. Lacking effective protection, approximately 400 Shawnee migrated in 1745 from Pennsylvania to Ohio, Kentucky, Alabama, and Illinois in an effort to escape the traders' influence.

Prior to 1754, the Shawnee maintained a headquarters at Shawnee Springs in present-day Cross Junction, Virginia. The father of the later chief Cornstalk held his council there. Several additional Shawnee villages were located throughout the northern Shenandoah Valley, including at Moorefield, West Virginia, along the North River, and on the Potomac at Cumberland, Maryland. In 1753, Shawnee living along the Scioto River in the Ohio Country sent messengers to those remaining in the Shenandoah Valley, urging them to cross the Alleghenies and join their western communities; they did so the following year. The settlement known as Shannoah (Lower Shawneetown) on the Ohio River grew to approximately 1,200 inhabitants by 1750.

"[I] saw four Indian Chiefs of the Shawnee Nation, who have been at War with the Virginians this summer (i.e. 1774), but have made peace with them, and they are sending these people to Williamsburg as hostages. They are tall, manly, well-shaped men, of a Copper colour with black hair, quick piercing eyes, and good features. They have rings of silver in their nose and bobs to them which hang over their upper lip. Their ears are cut from the tips two thirds of the way round and the piece extended with brass wire till it touches their shoulders, in this part they hang a thin silver plate, wrought in flourishes about three inches diameter, with plates of silver round their arms and in the hair, which is all cut off except a long lock on the top of the head. They are in white men's dress, except breeches which they refuse to wear, instead of which they have a girdle round them with a piece of cloth drawn through their legs and turned over the girdle, and appears like a short apron before and behind. All the hair is pulled from their eyebrows and eyelashes and their faces painted in different parts with Vermilion. They walk remarkably straight and cut a grotesque appearance in this mixed dress."

— from the Journal of Nicholas Cresswell

Since the Beaver Wars, the Haudenosaunee Confederacy claimed the Ohio Country as a hunting ground by right of conquest and treated the Shawnee and Lenape who resettled there as dependent tribes. Independent Haudenosaunee bands from various nations also migrated westward and became known in Ohio as the Mingo. These three peoples—the Shawnee, the Delaware (Lenape), and the Mingo—developed close associations despite linguistic differences: the first two spoke Algonquian languages, while the third spoke an Iroquoian language.

After participating in the opening phase of the French and Indian War (also known as "Braddock's War") as allies of the French, the Shawnee shifted their alliance in 1758 and made formal peace with the British colonies at the Treaty of Easton. This treaty recognized the Allegheny Ridge (the Eastern Divide) as a mutual boundary. The peace proved short-lived. In 1763, following Britain's defeat of France and assumption of its North American territories east of the Mississippi River, Pontiac's War erupted. Later that year, the Crown issued the Proclamation of 1763, legally reaffirming the 1758 boundary as the western limit of British settlement and reserving lands beyond it for Native Americans. The Crown, however, struggled to enforce the boundary as Anglo-European settlers continued to move westward.

The Treaty of Fort Stanwix extended the colonial boundary westward, granting British colonists claims to lands in what are now West Virginia and Kentucky. The Shawnee did not consent to this agreement, which had been negotiated between British officials and the Haudenosaunee Confederacy, who asserted sovereignty over the territory. Although the Shawnee and other Native American tribes predominated in the region, they also used it as shared hunting grounds. Following the Stanwix treaty, Anglo-American settlement in the Ohio River Valley accelerated, often by boat along the Ohio River. Rising violence between settlers and Native Americans culminated in Lord Dunmore's War in 1774. British diplomats succeeded in isolating the Shawnee during the conflict, as the Haudenosaunee and Lenape remained neutral. The Shawnee confronted the Virginia colony with only limited support from Mingo allies. Lord Dunmore, royal governor of Virginia, launched a two-pronged invasion into the Ohio Country. Shawnee chief Cornstalk engaged one wing of the invasion and fought to a draw in the war's only major battle, the Battle of Point Pleasant. Under the Treaty of Camp Charlotte, which ended the war in 1774, Cornstalk and the Shawnee were compelled to recognize the Ohio River as their southern boundary, as previously established by the Fort Stanwix treaty. By this agreement, the Shawnee relinquished claims to hunting grounds in present-day West Virginia and Kentucky south of the Ohio River. Many Shawnee leaders, however, refused to recognize this boundary. Shawnee society, like that of many Native nations, was highly decentralized, and individual bands and towns typically made independent decisions regarding alliances.

=== American Revolution ===
When the United States declared independence from the British Crown in 1776, the Shawnee were divided in their response. They did not support the American rebel cause. Cornstalk led a minority faction that favored neutrality. Shawnee communities north of the Ohio River were particularly dissatisfied with American settlement in Kentucky. Historian Colin Calloway reports that most Shawnee ultimately allied with the British against the Americans, hoping to expel settlers from west of the Appalachian Mountains.

War leaders such as Blackfish and Blue Jacket joined forces with Dragging Canoe and a band of Cherokee along the lower Tennessee River and Chickamauga Creek in resistance to colonial expansion in that region. Some colonists referred to this Cherokee group as the Chickamauga, after the river along which they lived during what later became known as the Cherokee–American wars, fought during and after the American Revolution. However, they were not a separate tribe, as some contemporary and later accounts suggested.

Following the American Revolution and during the Northwest Indian War, the Shawnee collaborated with the Miami to form a powerful military alliance in the Ohio Valley. Together, they led a broader confederation of Native American warriors seeking to expel U.S. settlers from the region. After their defeat by U.S. forces at the Battle of Fallen Timbers in 1794, most Shawnee bands signed the Treaty of Greenville the following year. Under the terms of the treaty, they were compelled to cede large portions of their homeland to the United States. Other Shawnee groups rejected the agreement and migrated independently to Missouri west of the Mississippi River, where they established settlements along Apple Creek. The French referred to this community as Le Grand Village Sauvage.

=== Tecumseh's War and the War of 1812 ===
In the early 19th century, the Shawnee leader Tecumseh gained prominence for organizing the intertribal alliance later known as Tecumseh's confederacy in opposition to American expansion into Native American lands. The resulting conflict became known as Tecumseh's War. The two principal adversaries in the conflict—Tecumseh and General William Henry Harrison—had both previously participated as junior figures in the 1794 Battle of Fallen Timbers. Tecumseh did not sign the 1795 Treaty of Greenville. Nevertheless, many Native American leaders in the region accepted the treaty's terms, and for roughly the next decade organized intertribal resistance to American hegemony diminished.

In September 1809, Harrison, then governor of the Indiana Territory, invited representatives of the Potawatomi, Lenape, Eel River people, and Miami to a council at Fort Wayne. During the negotiations, Harrison offered substantial subsidies in exchange for land cessions to the United States. After two weeks of discussion, Potawatomi leaders persuaded the Miami to accept the agreement as an act of reciprocity, noting that the Potawatomi had previously accepted treaties less favorable to themselves at the Miami's request. The assembled tribes ultimately signed the Treaty of Fort Wayne on September 30, 1809, ceding more than 3,000,000 acres (12,000 km^{2}) to the United States, primarily along the Wabash River north of Vincennes, Indiana.

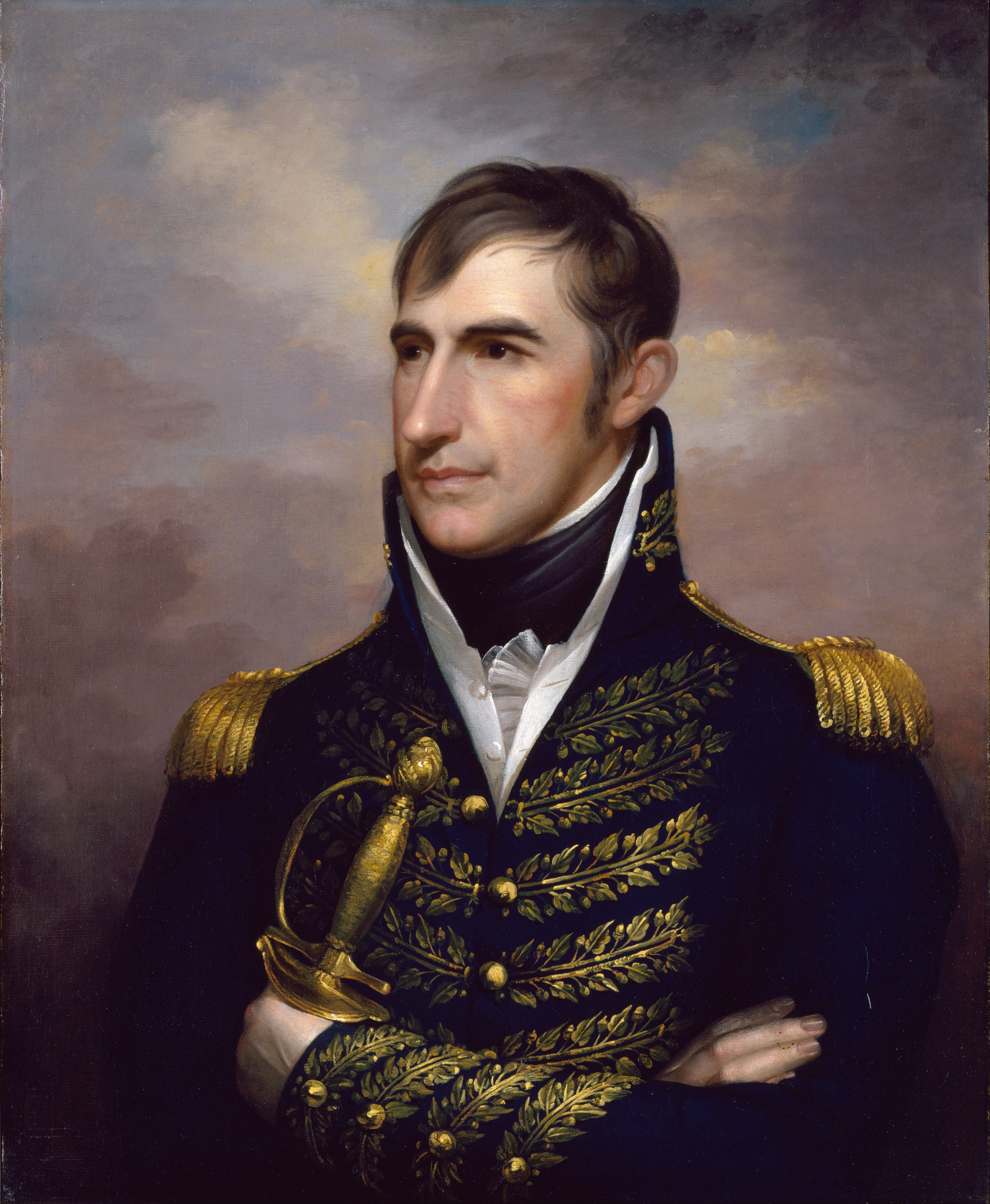
Portrait of William Henry Harrison, as the Congressional delegate from the Northwest Territory in 1800

Tecumseh strongly objected to the Treaty of Fort Wayne, arguing that Native American land was held collectively by all tribes, a principle previously articulated by the Shawnee leader Blue Jacket and the Mohawk leader Joseph Brant. In response, Tecumseh expanded upon the religious and political teachings of his brother Tenskwatawa, a spiritual leader known as The Prophet, who called upon Native peoples to return to their ancestral traditions. Tecumseh increasingly linked these teachings to the formation of a broad intertribal alliance. He traveled extensively, urging warriors to reject accommodationist leaders and to join the resistance centered at Prophetstown. In August 1810, Tecumseh led approximately 400 armed warriors to confront Harrison at Vincennes. There, Tecumseh demanded that Harrison invalidate the Treaty of Fort Wayne, threatening violence against the chiefs who had signed it. Harrison refused, asserting that the Miami were the rightful owners of the land and therefore entitled to sell it if they chose. Tecumseh departed peacefully but warned Harrison that he would seek an alliance with the British should the treaty remain in force.

==== Great Comet of 1811 and Tekoomsē ====
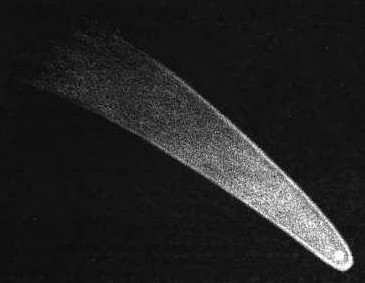
The Great Comet of 1811, as drawn by William Henry Smyth

In March, the Great Comet of 1811 appeared. Over the following year, tensions between American settlers and Native Americans increased rapidly. Four settlers were killed along the Missouri River, and in a separate incident, Native Americans seized a boatload of supplies from a group of traders. In response, Harrison summoned Tecumseh to Vincennes to explain the actions attributed to his allies. In August 1811, the two leaders met, during which Tecumseh assured Harrison that the Shawnee intended to remain at peace with the United States.

After this meeting, Tecumseh traveled to the Southeast in an effort to recruit allies against the United States among the "Five Civilized Tribes". His name, Tekoomsē, has been translated as meaning "Shooting Star" or "Panther Across the Sky".

Tecumseh told the Choctaw, Chickasaw, Muscogee, and many others that the comet of March 1811 had signaled his coming. He further stated that the people would soon witness additional signs confirming that the Great Spirit had sent him.

As Tecumseh continued his travels, both sides prepared for the Battle of Tippecanoe. Harrison assembled a force consisting of army regulars and militia to confront the Native confederacy. On November 6, 1811, Harrison led approximately 1,000 men toward Prophetstown, Indiana, intending to disperse Tecumseh's confederacy. Early the following morning, forces led by The Prophet launched a premature attack on Harrison's camp near the Tippecanoe River along the Wabash. Harrison repelled the assault, forcing the Native forces to withdraw and abandon Prophetstown. Harrison's troops subsequently burned the village before returning home.

==== New Madrid earthquake ====
On December 11, 1811, the New Madrid earthquake shook Muscogee lands and much of the Midwestern United States. Although interpretations of the event varied among different tribes, many agreed that the powerful earthquake carried spiritual significance. The earthquake and its subsequent aftershocks contributed to the growth of the Tecumseh resistance movement, as the Muscogee and other Native American peoples viewed the event as a sign that the Shawnee cause should be supported and that Tecumseh had successfully foretold such a phenomenon.

The Indians were filled with great terror ... the trees and wigwams shook exceedingly; the ice which skirted the margin of the Arkansas river was broken into pieces; and most of the Indians thought that the Great Spirit, angry with the human race, was about to destroy the world.

— Roger L. Nichols, The American Indian

==== Tribal involvement in the War of 1812 ====
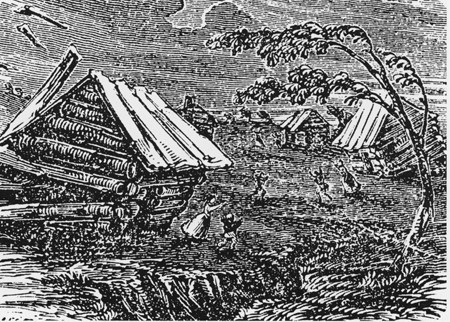
The New Madrid earthquake was interpreted by the Muscogee as a reason to support the Shawnee resistance.

The Muscogee who joined Tecumseh's confederation were known as the Red Sticks. They represented the more conservative and traditional segment of Muscogee society, as their communities in the Upper Towns were more geographically isolated from European-American settlements. They resisted cultural assimilation. Conflict developed between the Red Sticks and the Lower Creek, and their divisions escalated into a civil war known as the Creek War. This conflict became part of the broader War of 1812 when open fighting broke out between American forces and the Red Stick faction of the Creek.

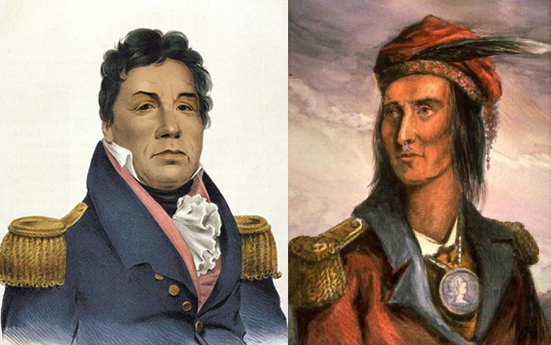

Portraits of the Choctaw chief Pushmataha (left) and Tecumseh.
These white Americans ... give us fair exchange, their cloth, their guns, their tools, implements, and other things which the Choctaws need but do not make ... They doctored our sick; they clothed our suffering; they fed our hungry ... So in marked contrast with the experience of the Shawnees, it will be seen that the whites and Indians in this section are living on friendly and mutually beneficial terms.
—Pushmataha, 1811 – Sharing Choctaw History.
---------------------
Where today are the Pequot? Where are the Narragansett, the Mohican, the Pocanet and other powerful tribes of our people? They have vanished before the avarice and oppression of the white man, as snow before the summer sun ... Sleep not longer, O Choctaws and Chickasaws ... Will not the bones of our dead be plowed up, and their graves turned into plowed fields?
—Tecumseh, 1811

After William Hull's surrender of Detroit to British forces during the War of 1812, General William Henry Harrison assumed command of the U.S. Army of the Northwest. He undertook an effort to recapture the city, which was defended by British Colonel Henry Procter along with Indigenous allies, including the Shawnee. A substantial detachment of Harrison's army was defeated at the Battle of Frenchtown along the River Raisin on January 22, 1813. Most of the captured soldiers were taken to Amherstburg in Upper Canada, but Procter left behind those too severely wounded to travel, guarded only lightly. On January 23, between 100 and 200 Native American warriors killed as many as 60 wounded American prisoners, many of them Kentucky militiamen. Although the Shawnee participated in the Battle of Frenchtown, it is unlikely that they took part in the killing of wounded prisoners. The incident became known as the "River Raisin Massacre." The defeat at Frenchtown ended Harrison's winter campaign against Detroit, and the phrase "Remember the River Raisin!" became a rallying cry among American forces.

In May 1813, Procter and Tecumseh besieged Fort Meigs in northern Ohio. Indigenous forces defeated American reinforcements arriving during the siege, but the fort's garrison held out. Over time, the Native warriors began to disperse, compelling Procter and Tecumseh to withdraw to Canada. A second offensive against Fort Meigs in July also failed. Procter and Tecumseh then attempted to capture Fort Stephenson, a small American outpost on the Sandusky River. After being repulsed with heavy losses, the British and Tecumseh abandoned their Ohio campaign.

On Lake Erie, Master Commandant Oliver Hazard Perry engaged a British squadron at the Battle of Lake Erie on September 10, 1813. His decisive victory secured American control of the lake, improved morale following earlier defeats, and forced British forces to withdraw from Amherstburg and Detroit. Harrison subsequently launched an invasion of Upper Canada, culminating in the American victory at the Battle of the Thames on October 5, 1813. Tecumseh was killed during the battle, and his death effectively ended the Indigenous alliance with Britain in the Detroit region. With American control of Lake Erie, British forces could no longer supply their Indigenous allies, many of whom withdrew from the conflict. The United States maintained control of the region for the remainder of the war.

=== Aftermath ===
The Shawnee in Missouri migrated south from the United States into Mexico, settling in the eastern part of Spanish Texas. They became known as the "Absentee Shawnee". They were joined during this migration by some Delaware (Lenape). Although they maintained a close alliance with the Cherokee led by The Bowl, their chief, John Linney, remained neutral during the 1839 Cherokee War.

After Texas achieved independence from Mexico under American leadership, the new republic decided to force the removal of the Shawnee from its territory. In recognition of their earlier neutrality, Texan President Mirabeau Lamar compensated the Shawnee for their improvements and crops. Despite this compensation, they were compelled to relocate to the Arkansas Territory. The Shawnee later settled near present-day Shawnee, Oklahoma. They were joined by Shawnee expelled from Kansas (see below), who shared similar traditionalist views and beliefs.

In 1817, the Ohio Shawnee signed the Treaty of Fort Meigs, ceding their remaining lands in exchange for three reservations in Wapaughkonetta, Hog Creek (near Lima), and Lewistown, Ohio. They shared these reservations with some Seneca people who had migrated westward from New York.

Through a series of treaties, including the Treaty of Lewistown of 1825, the Shawnee and Seneca agreed to exchange their lands in western Ohio for territory west of the Mississippi River in what later became Indian Territory. In July 1831, the Lewistown group of Seneca–Shawnee departed for Indian Territory, in present-day Kansas and Oklahoma.

The main body of Shawnee in Ohio followed Black Hoof, who resisted repeated efforts to force his people to relinquish their homeland. After Black Hoof's death, the remaining 400 Ohio Shawnee at Wapaughkonetta and Hog Creek surrendered their lands and relocated to the Shawnee Reserve in Kansas. This movement occurred largely under terms negotiated by Joseph Parks (1793–1859), who had been raised in the household of Lewis Cass and later served as a leading interpreter for the Shawnee.

After Missouri joined the Union in 1821, the Treaty of St. Louis led in 1825 to the forced relocation of approximately 1,400 Missouri Shawnee from Cape Girardeau along the west bank of the Mississippi River to southeastern Kansas, near the Neosho River.

By 1833, only Black Bob's band of Shawnee continued to resist removal. They settled in northeastern Kansas near Olathe and along the Kansas (Kaw) River in Monticello near Gum Springs. The Shawnee Methodist Mission was established nearby to serve the tribe. Around 200 Ohio Shawnee who followed the prophet Tenskwatawa had joined their Kansas relatives in this area by 1826.

During the mid-1830s, two companies of Shawnee soldiers were recruited into United States service to fight in the Seminole War in Florida. One company was led by Joseph Parks, who had previously assisted in negotiating land-cession treaties and was commissioned as a captain. Parks was a substantial landholder in both Westport, Missouri and Shawnee, Kansas. He was also a Freemason and a member of the Methodist Episcopal Church. In Shawnee, Kansas, a Shawnee cemetery was established in the 1830s and remained in use until the 1870s; Parks was among the most prominent individuals interred there.

In the 1853 Indian Appropriations Bill, the United States Congress allocated $64,366 to fulfill treaty obligations to the Shawnee, including annuities, education, and other services. An additional $2,000 was appropriated jointly for the Seneca and the Shawnee.

During the American Civil War, Black Bob's band fled Kansas and joined the Absentee Shawnee in Indian Territory in order to escape the conflict. After the war, the Shawnee in Kansas were expelled and forced to relocate to northeastern Oklahoma. The Shawnee descendants of the former Lewistown group became known as the "Eastern Shawnee".

The former Kansas Shawnee became known as the "Loyal Shawnee" (some attribute this designation to their support of the Union during the war; others suggest it reflects their status as the last group to leave their Ohio homelands). This group came to be regarded by the United States as part of the Cherokee Nation. They were also known as the "Cherokee Shawnee" and were settled on portions of Cherokee land in Indian Territory.

On June 7, 2024, at the site of the former Shawnee town of Old Chillicothe along U.S. Route 68 in Xenia Township, Greene County, Ohio, the Great Council State Park was opened with the participation of the three federally recognized Shawnee tribes: the Shawnee Tribe, the Eastern Shawnee Tribe of Oklahoma, and the Absentee Shawnee Tribe of Oklahoma.

== Federal recognition ==
In the late 20th century, the "Loyal" or "Cherokee" Shawnee initiated a movement to obtain federal recognition as a tribe independent of the Cherokee Nation. This recognition was granted through an act of the United States Congress, and the tribe is now officially known as the "Shawnee Tribe". Today, the majority of members of the three federally recognized Shawnee tribes, the "Shawnee Tribe", the Eastern Shawnee Tribe of Oklahoma, and the Absentee-Shawnee Tribe of Indians of Oklahoma, reside in Oklahoma.

== State-recognized tribe ==
The state of Alabama recognizes an organization, the Piqua Shawnee Tribe, as a state-recognized tribe under the Davis–Strong Act. Ohio does not recognize any Shawnee tribes or any other state-recognized tribes. Kentucky likewise has no mechanism for state recognition of tribes.

== Unrecognized groups who claim Shawnee descent ==
Dozens of unrecognized organizations self-identify as having Shawnee ancestry. These organizations are not federally recognized tribes nor state-recognized tribes.

The Cultural Preservation Department of the Absentee Shawnee Tribal Historic Preservation Office has stated that, within ancestral settlement areas including but not limited to Ohio, Kentucky, West Virginia, Indiana, and Alabama, there are individuals who claim Shawnee ancestry. The department noted that while such claims are not inherently problematic, concern arises when individuals or groups use these claims to exploit Shawnee culture for personal gain, particularly among members of the public who may be unaware of the significant political and cultural distinctions separating federally recognized Shawnee tribes from those of alleged Shawnee ancestry.

Ben Barnes, chief of the Shawnee Tribe, has written that "groups claiming to be tribal sovereigns has reached a new level of concern for the Shawnee Tribe and other tribal nations." He further stated:

There are currently 36 unestablished Shawnee "tribes" operating as 501(c)(3) non-profits across the country. Their 501(c)(3) designations allow them to solicit donations and participate in grants meant for Tribal nations. They pose as spokespeople for our ancestors at historic sites, state historical societies, and university campuses causing significant harm to our identity, culture, and reputation. These groups are violating the sacred, ancient places of our ancestors. They perform their ideas of our ceremonies on top of our burial mounds and have stolen our language, customs, and ceremonies.

The United Remnant Band of the Shawnee Nation of Bellefontaine, Ohio, has been the subject of state-level consideration. In 1979 and 1980, the Ohio state legislature held hearings regarding state recognition of the United Remnant Band. The band submitted historical and genealogical documentation to the state in support of its claim of descent from the historical Shawnee. The Ohio General Assembly conducted hearings and heard testimony from multiple parties. In 1980, the 113th Ohio General Assembly adopted a "Joint Resolution to recognize the Shawnee Nation United Remnant Band," passed by the Ohio Senate during the Regular Session, Am. Sub. H.J.R. No. 8, 1979–1980. This measure was a congratulatory resolution and carried no legal force. An Ohio attorney general's office spokesperson later explained that "the resolution has no force of law in the state of Ohio… It was basically a ceremonial resolution."

== Social and kinship groups ==
Before contact with Europeans, the Shawnee had a patrilineal social system, in which descent and inheritance were traced through the paternal line. This differed from the kinship systems of many other Native American tribes, which were matrilineal. In matrilineal systems, children were considered members of their mother's family and clan, and inheritance and property passed through the female line.

According to the mid-19th-century historian Henry Harvey, the Shawnee were ruled by kings, whom he referred to as sachema [or sachems], who succeeded to office through a matrilineal line. Under this system, a king's own children would not inherit his position. Instead, succession passed to the sons of his brother through the mother, or to the sons of his sister, and subsequently to the sons of her daughter. Women did not inherit the position directly. Harvey suggested that this form of succession was favored because a woman's sons were always considered unquestionably legitimate.

The five divisions, or septs, of the tribe were commonly known as:

- Chillicothe (Principal Place), Chalahgawtha, Chalaka, Chalakatha; the principal division of "Tschillicothi," appointed by the first leading Illini or man, Kwikullay
- Hathawekela, Thawikila
- Kispoko, Kispokotha, Kishpoko, Kishpokotha; from ishpoko, related to the Ispogi, meaning swamps or marshy lands in Muscogee usage, particularly associated with Tukabatchi
- Mekoche, Mequachake, Machachee, Maguck, Mackachack, etc.; Mackochee
- Pekowi, Pekuwe, Piqua, Pekowitha; Pickywanni or Pickquay

War chiefs were also hereditary and descended through the maternal line within the Kispoko division.

A 1935 study noted that the Shawnee consisted of five septs and were also organized into six clans or name groups based on kinship. Each clan embodied specific spiritual values and held a recognized role within the broader confederacy. Each name group was present within all five divisions, and every Shawnee belonged to both a division and a clan or name group.

The six name groups were:

- Pellewomhsoomi (Turkey name group), representing bird life
- Kkahkileewomhsoomi (Turtle name group), representing aquatic life
- Petekoθiteewomhsoomi (Rounded-feet name group), representing carnivorous animals such as dogs and wolves, or animals with rounded paws
- Mseewiwomhsoomi (Horse name group), representing herbivorous animals such as horses and deer
- θepatiiwomhsoomi (Raccoon name group), representing animals with tearing paws, such as raccoons and bears
- Petakineeθiiwomhsoomi (Rabbit name group), representing gentleness and peacefulness

Each sept or division maintained a principal village where its chief resided, and this settlement was typically named after the division itself. By tradition, each Shawnee division and clan performed specific functions on behalf of the entire tribe. By the time these kinship structures were recorded by European American observers, many of these long-standing social traditions were already in decline and are therefore not well understood. Disruption and repeated displacement of the Shawnee from the 17th through the 19th centuries contributed to changes in the roles of the divisions.

Today, the United States government recognizes three Shawnee tribes, all located in Oklahoma:

- The Absentee-Shawnee Tribe of Indians of Oklahoma, consisting primarily of the Hathawekela, Kispokotha, and Pekuwe divisions
- The Eastern Shawnee Tribe of Oklahoma, composed largely of the Mekoche division
- The Shawnee Tribe, formerly regarded as part of the Cherokee Nation, composed mainly of the Chaalakatha and Mekoche divisions; Petakineeθiiwomhsoomi (Rabbit name group) stands alone as the Tail, or final group

As of 2008, there were 7,584 enrolled Shawnee, the majority of whom lived in Oklahoma.

== Notable historic Shawnee ==
Shawnee individuals from the 20th and 21st centuries are listed under their respective federally recognized tribes.

- Big Hominy (Meshemethequater, 1690–1758), respected warrior noted for participating in peace conferences that helped prevent warfare between English settlers and the Shawnee
- Black Bob (Wawahchepaehai or Wawahchepaekar), 19th-century leader and war chief active in Ohio
- Black Hoof (Catahecassa, 1740–1831), respected Shawnee chief who believed adaptation to European-American culture was necessary for his people's survival
- Black Snake (Peteusha) and Big Snake (Shemanetoo), leaders active in Lord Dunmore's War, the American Revolutionary War, and the Northwest Indian War
- Blackfish (Chiungalla, 1729–1779), Shawnee chief of the Chillicothe division
- Blue Jacket (Waweyapiersenwaw, "Blue Jacket", 1743–1810), prominent leader in the Northwest Indian War and an early supporter of Tecumseh
- Peter Chartier (Wacanackshina, "White One Who Reclines", 1690–1759), French-Canadian/Shawnee leader who opposed the sale of alcohol in Shawnee communities and fought on the French side during the French and Indian War
- Chiksika (Chiuxca, "Black Stump", 1760–1792), Kispoko war chief and elder brother of Tecumseh
- Cornstalk (Hokolesqua, 1720–1777), Shawnee leader during Lord Dunmore's War
- George Drouillard (1773–1810), French-Canadian/Shawnee who served as a scout on the Lewis and Clark Expedition
- Kakowatcheky (d. ca. 1755), influential Shawnee chief and political leader
- Kekewepelethy ("Captain Johnny", d. c. 1808), principal civil chief of the Shawnee in the Ohio Country during the Northwest Indian War
- Captain Logan (Spemica Lawba, "High Horn", c. 1776–1812), noted scout and interpreter who served on the American side during the War of 1812
- Neucheconeh (d. ca. 1748), chief of the western Pennsylvania Shawnee who opposed unrestricted alcohol sales in Shawnee communities
- Nonhelema (1720–1786), sister of Cornstalk, known for assisting in the compilation of a dictionary of the Shawnee language
- Opessa Straight Tail (Wapatha, 1664–1750), chief of the Pekowi band who signed multiple peace treaties with William Penn before leading his people west to the Ohio River Valley around 1727
- Tecumseh (c. 1768–1813), Shawnee leader who, with his brother Tenskwatawa, sought to unite tribes west of the Appalachians against expanding European-American settlement
- Tenskwatawa ("The Open Door", 1775–1836), Shawnee prophet and younger brother of Tecumseh

== See also ==
- Battle of Tippecanoe Outdoor Drama – Outdoor play performed in Indiana, United States
