= Saunemin =

Saunemin may refer to:

- Saunemin, Illinois, village
- Saunemin Township, Livingston County, Illinois
