= Prophetstown =

Prophetstown may refer to

In Illinois, USA:

- Prophetstown, Illinois
- Prophetstown Township, Whiteside County, Illinois
- Prophetstown State Recreation Area

In Indiana, USA:

- Prophet's Town or Prophetstown, a multiethnic indigenous village and the site of the 1811 Battle of Tippecanoe
- Prophetstown State Park, near the battle site
