= Prophetstown State Recreation Area =

State park in Illinois, USA

Prophetstown State Park
- IUCN category V (protected landscape/seascape)
- Location within Illinois Location within the United States
- Location: Whiteside County, Illinois, USA
- Nearest city: Prophetstown, Illinois
- Coordinates: 41°40′19″N 89°55′26″W
- Area: 53 acres (21 ha)
- Established: 1947
- Governing body: Illinois Department of Natural Resources
- Website: Official Website

Prophetstown State Park is an Illinois state park on 53 acres (21 ha) in Whiteside County, Illinois, United States. Situated on south bank of the Rock River adjoining modern Prophetstown, Illinois, it was the site of a native American village founded by Ho-Chunk chief Wabokieshiek (also known as White Cloud) along the Sauk Trail and populated in the early 19th century by Native Americans of various tribes who did not wish to evacuate across the Mississippi River as whites moved to the area. It became a strategic target during the Black Hawk War. Illinois militia general Samuel Whiteside ordered the recently abandoned village burned on May 10, 1832.

Pursuant to the efforts of newspaperman and 10-term Prophetstown mayor George S. Brydia, who also served many terms as a representative in the Illinois General Assembly, the state park was founded in 1947. Gov. William G. Stratton formally dedicated the park on September 18, 1953.

It has a campground and other facilities, but may be closed (especially before May 1 annually) due to flooding or budget constraints.
