= Kempton, Illinois =

Kempton
- Village
- Location of Kempton in Ford County, Illinois
- Coordinates: 40°56′8″N 88°14′15″W
- Country: United States
- State: Illinois
- County: Ford

Area
  - Total: 0.17 sq mi (0.43 km^{2})
  - Land: 0.17 sq mi (0.43 km^{2})
  - Water: 0 sq mi (0.00 km^{2})
- Elevation: 732 ft (223 m)

Population (2020)
  - Total: 176
  - Density: 1,068/sq mi (412.5/km^{2})
- Time zone: UTC-6 (CST)
  - Summer (DST): UTC-5 (CDT)
- ZIP code: 60946
- Area code: 815
- FIPS code: 17-39441
- GNIS feature ID: 2398335

Kempton is a village in Ford County, Illinois, United States. The population was 176 at the 2020 census.

== History ==
A post office was established at the site of Kempton in 1869 and called Sugar Loaf. The name of the post office was changed to Kempton in 1878, when the village was founded and named after its founder, Wright Kemp. Arthur R. Falter (1906–1979), Illinois state legislator and businessman, was born on a farm near Kempton. David Hatcher Childress, famously featured in over 100 episodes of Ancient Aliens on the History Channel lives in Kempton and Camp Verde, Arizona and is another famous resident of Kempton.

== Geography ==
According to the 2021 census gazetteer files, Kempton has a total area of 0.17 square miles (0.44 km^{2}), all land.

== Demographics ==
Historical population
Census	Pop.	Note	%±
1880	114		—
1890	201		76.3%
1900	409		103.5%
1910	269		−34.2%
1920	266		−1.1%
1930	289		8.6%
1940	259		−10.4%
1950	255		−1.5%
1960	252		−1.2%
1970	263		4.4%
1980	265		0.8%
1990	219		−17.4%
2000	235		7.3%
2010	231		−1.7%
2020	176		−23.8%
U.S. Decennial Census

As of the 2020 census there were 176 people, 127 households, and 60 families residing in the village. The population density was 1,066.67 inhabitants per square mile (411.84/km^{2}). There were 97 housing units at an average density of 587.88 per square mile (226.98/km^{2}). The racial makeup of the village was 96.02% White, 0.00% African American, 0.00% Native American, 0.00% Asian, 0.00% Pacific Islander, 2.84% from other races, and 1.14% from two or more races. Hispanic or Latino of any race were 2.84% of the population.

There were 127 households, out of which 25.2% had children under the age of 18 living with them, 31.50% were married couples living together, 7.87% had a female householder with no husband present, and 52.76% were non-families. 25.20% of all households were made up of individuals, and 17.32% had someone living alone who was 65 years of age or older. The average household size was 3.02 and the average family size was 2.50.

The village's age distribution consisted of 25.2% under the age of 18, 13.2% from 18 to 24, 38.8% from 25 to 44, 11.9% from 45 to 64, and 10.7% who were 65 years of age or older. The median age was 35.5 years. For every 100 females, there were 69.5 males. For every 100 females age 18 and over, there were 71.7 males.

The median income for a household in the village was $60,703, and the median income for a family was $77,857. Males had a median income of $41,250 versus $42,917 for females. The per capita income for the village was $26,727. About 10.0% of families and 28.1% of the population were below the poverty line, including 41.3% of those under age 18 and 0.0% of those age 65 or over.
