= Wabokieshiek =

Native American leader (c. 1794–c. 1841)

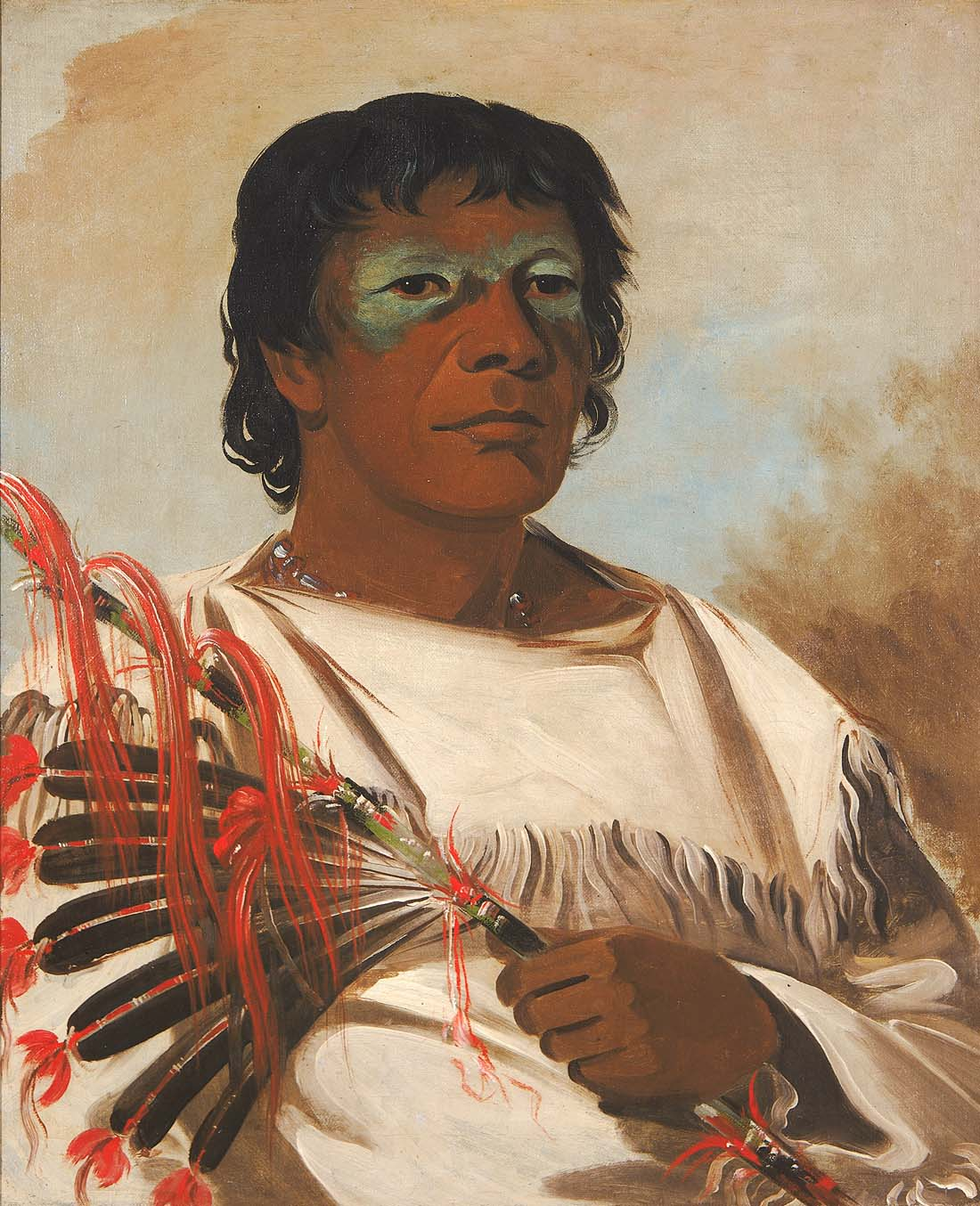

Wabokieshiek (translated White Cloud, The Light or White Sky Light in English) (c. 1794 – c. 1841) was a Native American army commander of the Ho-Chunk (Winnebago) and Sauk tribes in 19th century Illinois, playing a key role in the Black Hawk War of 1832. Known as a medicine man and prophet, he is sometimes called the Winnebago Prophet.

Wabokieshiek was born as Poweshiek to a Sauk father and a Ho-Chunk mother in the vicinity of Prophetstown, Illinois, which is named after him. Like his father, he was considered a Sac chief, and was also very influential among the Ho-Chunk, and he was known for his promotion of a traditional way of life among the local tribes. However, his influence waned after he promised/prophesied to Sauk/Fox chief Black Hawk that the British and other tribes (such as the Ho-Chunk and Potawatomi) would aid him against the United States in what became the Black Hawk War, a prediction that proved false. At the end of the war, on August 27, 1832, Wabokieshiek was taken prisoner along with the remnant of Black Hawk's band. The prisoners were sent to Washington, D.C. (meeting with Andrew Jackson) and then to Fort Monroe, Virginia in April, 1833. On June 5, 1833, they were sent back West to be released; Wabokieshiek and his son were released at Prairie du Chien, Wisconsin. After this time, he lived quietly until he died circa 1841.

Wabokieshiek is sometimes confused with Red Cloud, a Lakota chief, and Mahaska, an Ioway also called White Cloud.
