= Arthur R. Falter =

American teacher, businessman, and politician

Arthur Raphael Falter (June 15, 1906–July 2, 1979) was an American teacher, businessman and politician who served in the Illinois House of Representatives in 1961 and 1962. Falter was born on a farm near Kempton, Illinois. He went to the local public schools and to Illinois Wesleyan University. Falter lived in Saunemin, with his wife and family. He taught school and was in the grain business. He also supervised the operation of the grain elevators. He was a Republican. Falter died at Fairbury Hospital in Saunemin from a long illness.
