= Saunemin Township, Livingston County, Illinois =

Coordinates: 40°53′01″N 88°24′40″W

Saunemin Township
- Township
- Location in Livingston County

- Livingston County's location in Illinois
- Country: United States
- State: Illinois
- County: Livingston
- Established: November 3, 1857

Area
  - Total: 43.11 sq mi (111.7 km^{2})
  - Land: 43.11 sq mi (111.7 km^{2})
  - Water: 0 sq mi (0 km^{2}) 0%

Population (2020)
  - Total: 612
  - Density: 14.2/sq mi (5.48/km^{2})
- Time zone: UTC-6 (CST)
  - Summer (DST): UTC-5 (CDT)
- FIPS code: 17-105-67808

Saunemin Township is located in Livingston County, Illinois, United States. As of the 2020 census, its population was 612 and it contained 267 housing units. It is named after, and contains, Saunemin, Illinois.

== Geography ==
According to the 2021 census gazetteer files, Saunemin Township has a total area of 43.11 square miles (111.65 km^{2}), all land.

== Demographics ==
As of the 2020 census there were 612 people, 271 households, and 229 families residing in the township. The population density was 14.20 inhabitants per square mile (5.48/km^{2}). There were 267 housing units at an average density of 6.19 per square mile (2.39/km^{2}). The racial makeup of the township was 93.95% White, 0.16% African American, 0.98% Native American, 0.00% Asian, 0.00% Pacific Islander, 0.65% from other races, and 4.25% from two or more races. Hispanic or Latino of any race were 4.25% of the population.

There were 271 households, out of which 38.00% had children under the age of 18 living with them, 69.00% were married couples living together, 8.12% had a female householder with no spouse present, and 15.50% were non-families. 14.40% of all households were made up of individuals, and 7.00% had someone living alone who was 65 years of age or older. The average household size was 2.68 and the average family size was 2.89.

According to the 2020 American Community Survey, township's age distribution consisted of 26.5% under the age of 18, 7.2% from 18 to 24, 22.3% from 25 to 44, 28.3% from 45 to 64, and 15.7% who were 65 years of age or older. The median age was 35.7 years. For every 100 females, there were 90.1 males. For every 100 females age 18 and over, there were 92.5 males.

The median income for a household in the township was $55,729, and the median income for a family was $58,750. Males had a median income of $51,250 versus $27,500 for females. The per capita income for the township was $24,127. About 9.6% of families and 13.4% of the population were below the poverty line, including 17.7% of those under age 18 and 4.4% of those age 65 or over.

Historical population
Census	Pop.	Note	%±
2000	690		—
2010	666		−3.5%
2020	612		−8.1%
U.S. Decennial Census
