= George S. Brydia =

American journalist, salesman, and politician

Member of the Illinois House of Representatives
- In office 1939–1965

Personal details
- Born: George Sidney Brydia; June 27, 1887 Saunemin, Illinois, U.S.
- Died: June 5, 1970 (aged 82) Prophetstown, Illinois, U.S.
- Party: Republican
- Occupation: Politician, journalist, salesman

George Sidney Brydia (June 27, 1887 – June 5, 1970) was an American journalist, salesman, and politician.

Born in Saunemin, Illinois, Brydia was educated in the Fairbury, Illinois public schools. He worked as a reporter for the Fairbury Local Record newspaper and was a linotype operator. In 1908, Brydia moved to Prophetstown, Illinois and was a traveling salesman. He served as mayor of Prophetstown and was involved with the Republican Party. Brydia served in the Illinois House of Representatives from 1939 until 1965. Brydia died at Prophets Riverview Center in Prophetstown, Illinois.
