= Vincent Falter =

U.S. Army major general (1932–2024)

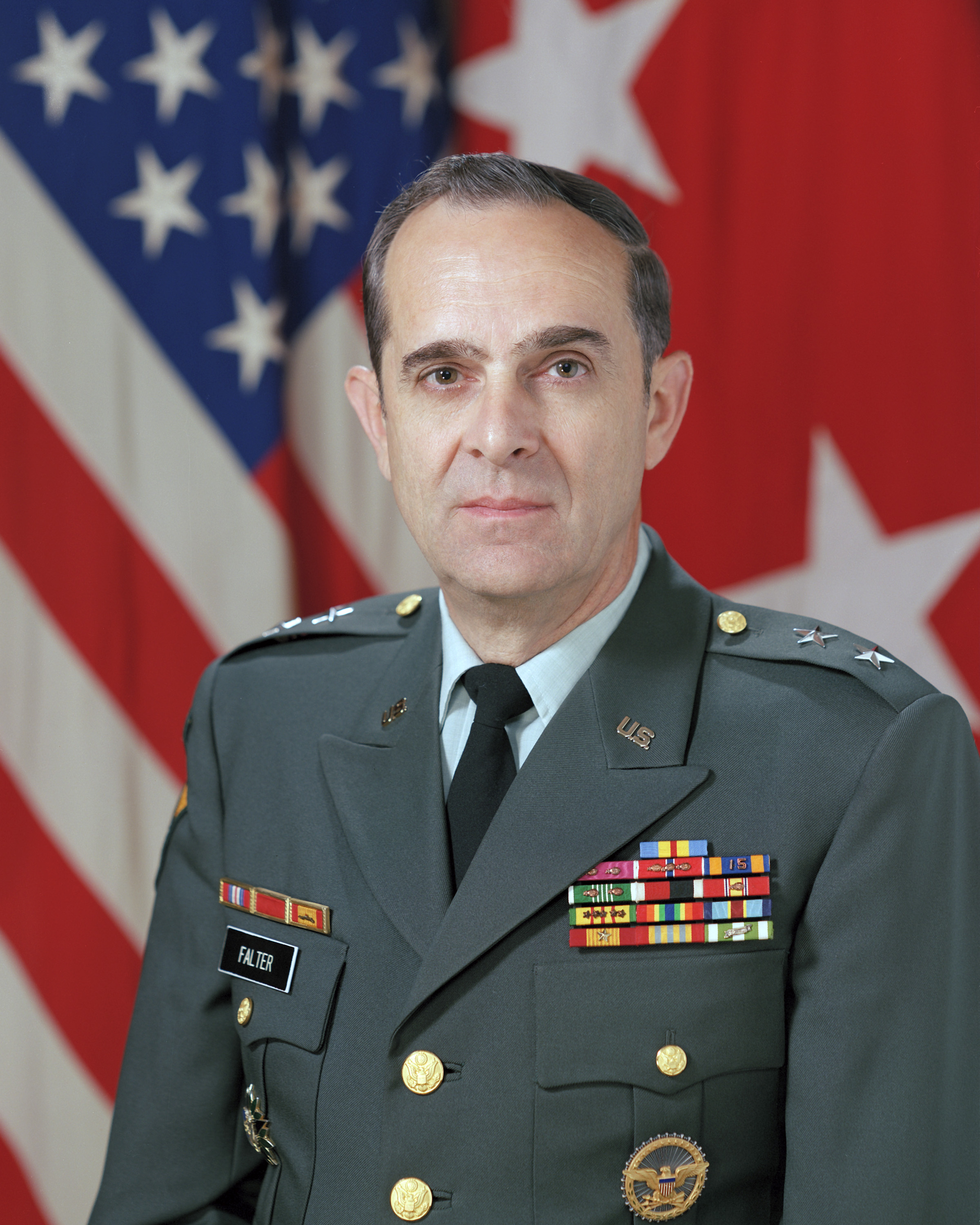
- Born: 20 December 1932; Akron, Ohio U.S.
- Died: 17 September 2024 (aged 91)
- Military career
- Allegiance: United States
- Branch: United States Army
- Service years: 1953–1987
- Rank: Major General
- Commands: United States Army Military Personnel Center
- Conflicts: Vietnam War
- Awards: Defense Distinguished Service Medal (2); Army Distinguished Service Medal; Legion of Merit (3); Bronze Star Medal (4); Air Medal (15)

Vincent Eugene Falter (20 December 1932 – 17 September 2024) was a major general in the United States Army. He served as Commanding General of the United States Army Military Personnel Center. He enlisted in the Army in May 1953 and was commissioned in May 1954 after graduating from Field Artillery Officer Candidate School. He later completed a B.Ed. degree in military science at the University of Nebraska Omaha in 1963 and earned a M.P.A. degree from Shippensburg State College. Falter died at home on 17 September 2024, at the age of 91.
