= Saunemin, Illinois =

- Village
- Village of Saunemin
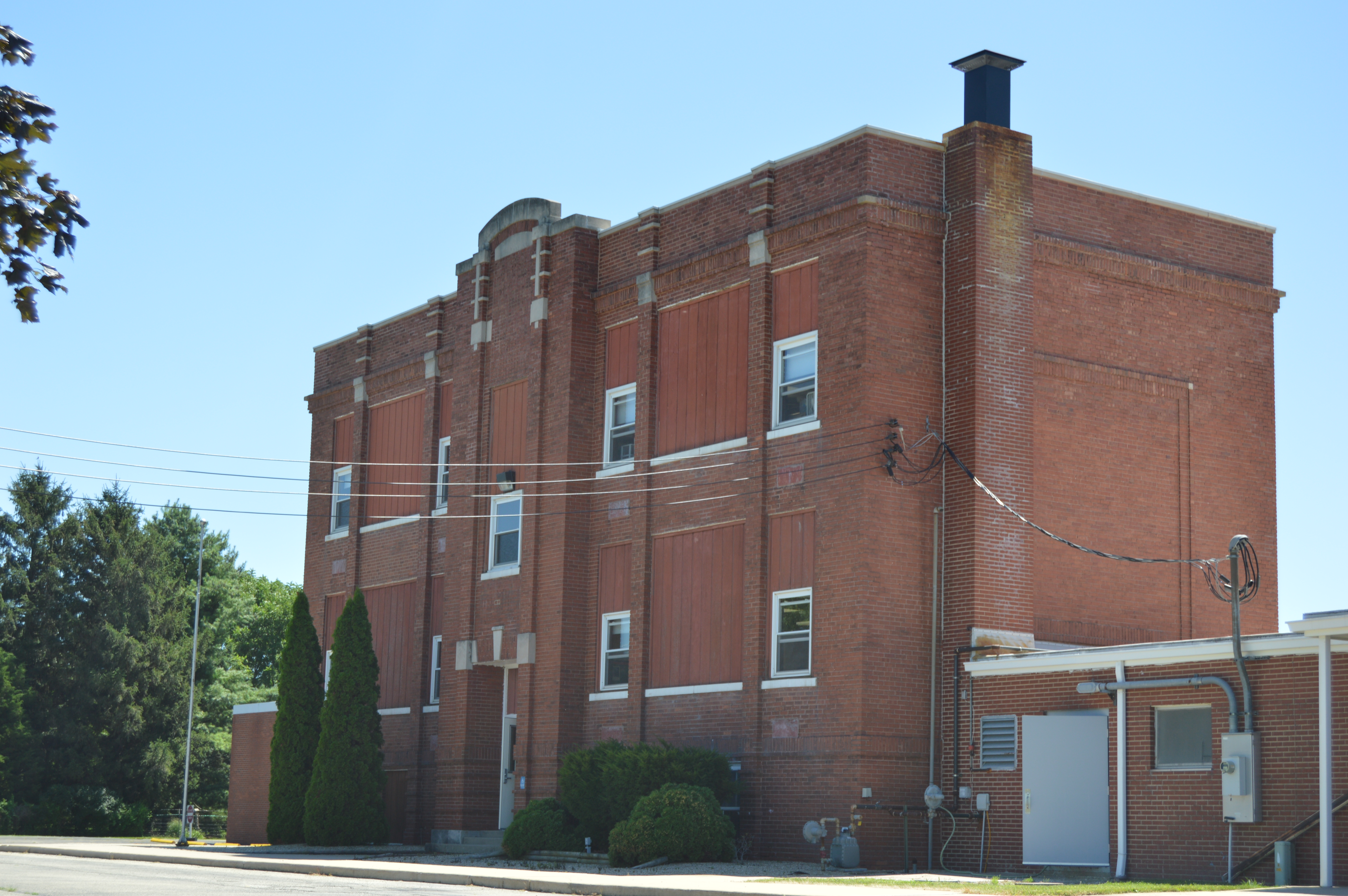
- Saunemin Elementary School
- Interactive map of Saunemin, Illinois
- Coordinates: 40°53′34″N 88°24′21″W
- Country: United States
- State: Illinois
- County: Livingston
- Township: Saunemin
- Founded: November 3, 1857
- Elevation: 686 ft (209 m)

Population (2020)
  - Total: 396
- ZIP code: 61769
- Area code: 815
- GNIS feature ID: 2399763
- FIPS Code: 17-67795

Saunemin is a village in Livingston County, Illinois, United States. As of 2020 the population was 406.

== Geography ==
Saunemin is located in eastern Livingston County. Illinois Route 116 passes through the southern side of the village, leading west 12 miles (19 km) to Pontiac, the county seat, and east 26 miles (42 km) to Ashkum. The village limits extend west along Route 116 to the crossroads with Illinois Route 47, which leads north 15 miles (24 km) to Dwight and south 10 miles (16 km) to Forrest.

According to the 2021 census gazetteer files, Saunemin has a total area of 0.23 square miles (0.60 km^{2}), of which 0.23 square miles (0.60 km^{2}) (or 99.14%) is land and 0.00 square miles (0.00 km^{2}) (or 0.86%) is water.

== Demographics ==
Historical population
Census	Pop.	Note	%±
1880	228		—
1890	366		60.5%
1900	350		−4.4%
1910	357		2.0%
1920	360		0.8%
1930	376		4.4%
1940	341		−9.3%
1950	338		−0.9%
1960	392		16.0%
1970	415		5.9%
1980	463		11.6%
1990	399		−13.8%
2000	456		14.3%
2010	420		−7.9%
2020	406		−3.3%
U.S. Decennial Census

As of the 2020 census there were 406 people, 129 households, and 108 families residing in the village. The population density was 1,742.49 inhabitants per square mile (672.78/km^{2}). There were 161 housing units at an average density of 690.99 per square mile (266.79/km^{2}). The racial makeup of the village was 91.87% White, 0.25% African American, 1.48% Native American, 0.00% Asian, 0.00% Pacific Islander, 0.74% from other races, and 5.67% from two or more races. Hispanic or Latino of any race were 5.67% of the population.

There were 129 households, out of which 39.5% had children under the age of 18 living with them, 62.02% were married couples living together, 14.73% had a female householder with no husband present, and 16.28% were non-families. 13.95% of all households were made up of individuals, and 6.20% had someone living alone who was 65 years of age or older. The average household size was 3.30 and the average family size was 3.09.

The village's age distribution consisted of 30.9% under the age of 18, 9.8% from 18 to 24, 16.6% from 25 to 44, 30.9% from 45 to 64, and 11.8% who were 65 years of age or older. The median age was 37.4 years. For every 100 females, there were 89.5 males. For every 100 females age 18 and over, there were 79.7 males.

The median income for a household in the village was $56,250, and the median income for a family was $61,000. Males had a median income of $51,094 versus $16,667 for females. The per capita income for the village was $20,457. About 15.7% of families and 19.9% of the population were below the poverty line, including 17.9% of those under age 18 and 10.6% of those age 65 or over.

== Notable people ==
- George S. Brydia, journalist, salesman, and politician; born in Saunemin
- Albert Cashier, a transgender man who enlisted in the army during the American Civil War
- Arthur R. Falter, businessman and politician
- Ira M. Lish, businessman, Representative and Senator of Illinois
