= Prophetstown, Illinois =

Prophetstown
- City
- Location of Prophetstown in Whiteside County, Illinois

- Location of Illinois in the United States
- Coordinates: 41°40′13″N 89°56′05″W
- Country: United States
- State: Illinois
- County: Whiteside

Area
  - Total: 1.37 sq mi (3.54 km^{2})
  - Land: 1.34 sq mi (3.47 km^{2})
  - Water: 0.027 sq mi (0.07 km^{2})
- Elevation: 630 ft (190 m)

Population (2020)
  - Total: 1,946
  - Density: 1,453.3/sq mi (561.11/km^{2})
- Time zone: UTC-6 (CST)
  - Summer (DST): UTC-5 (CDT)
- ZIP code: 61277
- Area code: 815
- FIPS code: 17-61977
- GNIS feature ID: 2396287
- Website: prophetstownil.org

Prophetstown is a city in Whiteside County, Illinois, United States. As of the 2020 census, Prophetstown had a population of 1,946.

== Geography ==
According to the 2010 census, Prophetstown has a total area of 1.394 square miles (3.61 km^{2}), of which 1.37 square miles (3.55 km^{2}) (or 98.28%) is land and 0.024 square miles (0.06 km^{2}) (or 1.72%) is water.

== History ==
An 1825 treaty established an unnamed "Winnebago village" about 40 miles above the mouth of the Rock River as a boundary point of the Winnebago, corresponding to the location of Prophetstown.

Prophetstown occupies the site of the village of the Winnebago prophet, which the Illinois volunteers destroyed on May 10, 1832, in the first act of hostility in the Black Hawk War. Prophetstown was named for Wabokieshiek (White Cloud), the prophet who lived upon the land. Wabokieshiek served as an advisor to Black Hawk and took part in the Black Hawk War. Wabokieshiek and his followers, the Sauk people, resided where the current Prophetstown State Park (of Illinois) is now located. They left the land in 1832 as the Black Hawk War ended, when Wabokieshiek was taken captive by the United States. This area is now a state park, but at one time it held a community of 14 villages.

== Demographics ==
Historical population
Census	Pop.	Note	%±
1870	276		—
1880	803		190.9%
1890	694		−13.6%
1900	1,143		64.7%
1910	1,083		−5.2%
1920	1,159		7.0%
1930	1,353		16.7%
1940	1,469		8.6%
1950	1,691		15.1%
1960	1,802		6.6%
1970	1,915		6.3%
1980	2,141		11.8%
1990	1,749		−18.3%
2000	2,023		15.7%
2010	2,080		2.8%
2020	1,946		−6.4%
U.S. Decennial Census

=== 2020 census ===
As of the 2020 census, Prophetstown had a population of 1,946. The median age was 44.1 years. 22.3% of residents were under the age of 18 and 23.7% of residents were 65 years of age or older. For every 100 females there were 100.0 males, and for every 100 females age 18 and over there were 95.1 males age 18 and over.

0.0% of residents lived in urban areas, while 100.0% lived in rural areas.

There were 785 households in Prophetstown, of which 27.8% had children under the age of 18 living in them. Of all households, 45.5% were married-couple households, 19.5% were households with a male householder and no spouse or partner present, and 26.9% were households with a female householder and no spouse or partner present. About 33.2% of all households were made up of individuals and 19.0% had someone living alone who was 65 years of age or older.

There were 878 housing units, of which 10.6% were vacant. The homeowner vacancy rate was 3.9% and the rental vacancy rate was 13.4%.

Racial composition as of the 2020 census
Race	Number	Percent
White	1,800	92.5%
Black or African American	24	1.2%
American Indian and Alaska Native	2	0.1%
Asian	7	0.4%
Native Hawaiian and Other Pacific Islander	0	0.0%
Some other race	10	0.5%
Two or more races	103	5.3%
Hispanic or Latino (of any race)	70	3.6%

=== 2000 census ===
As of the census of 2000, there were 2,023 people, 809 households, and 533 families residing in the city. The population density was 1,484.5 inhabitants per square mile (573.2/km^{2}). There were 865 housing units at an average density of 634.7 per square mile (245.1/km^{2}). The racial makeup of the city was 97.92% White, 0.89% African American, 0.10% Native American, 0.10% Asian, 0.25% from other races, and 0.74% from two or more races. Hispanic or Latino people of any race were 1.14% of the population.

There were 809 households, out of which 25.5% had children under the age of 18 living with them, 56.1% were married couples living together, 7.4% had a female householder with no husband present, and 34.0% were non-families. 31.6% of all households were made up of individuals, and 17.8% had someone living alone who was 65 years of age or older. The average household size was 2.31 and the average family size was 2.89.

In the city, the population was spread out, with 21.4% under the age of 18, 7.2% from 18 to 24, 25.2% from 25 to 44, 23.3% from 45 to 64, and 23.0% who were 65 years of age or older. The median age was 43 years. For every 100 females, there were 93.4 males. For every 100 females age 18 and over, there were 88.3 males.

The median income for a household in the city was $37,452, and the median income for a family was $47,589. Males had a median income of $33,828 versus $21,438 for females. The per capita income for the city was $19,572. About 3.9% of families and 9.5% of the population were below the poverty line, including 8.4% of those under age 18 and 4.0% of those age 65 or over.

== Education ==
Prophetstown-Lyndon-Tampico Community Unit School District 3 is the public school district. Prophetstown Elementary School and the 6-12 Campus are in this municipality.

== Notable people ==
- Bret Bielema (1970–), head football coach for the University of Illinois
- George S. Brydia (1887–1970), journalist and politician; served as mayor of Prophetstown
- Claude A. Fuller, former third district congressman from Arkansas; born in Prophetstown in 1876
- Paul E. Rink (1916–2000), Illinois state legislator and judge; born on a farm near Prophetstown
- Vesta Stoudt (1891-1966), inventor of modern duct tape.

== See also ==
- List of cities in Illinois
