= John Strong (Michigan politician) =

American politician (1830–1913)

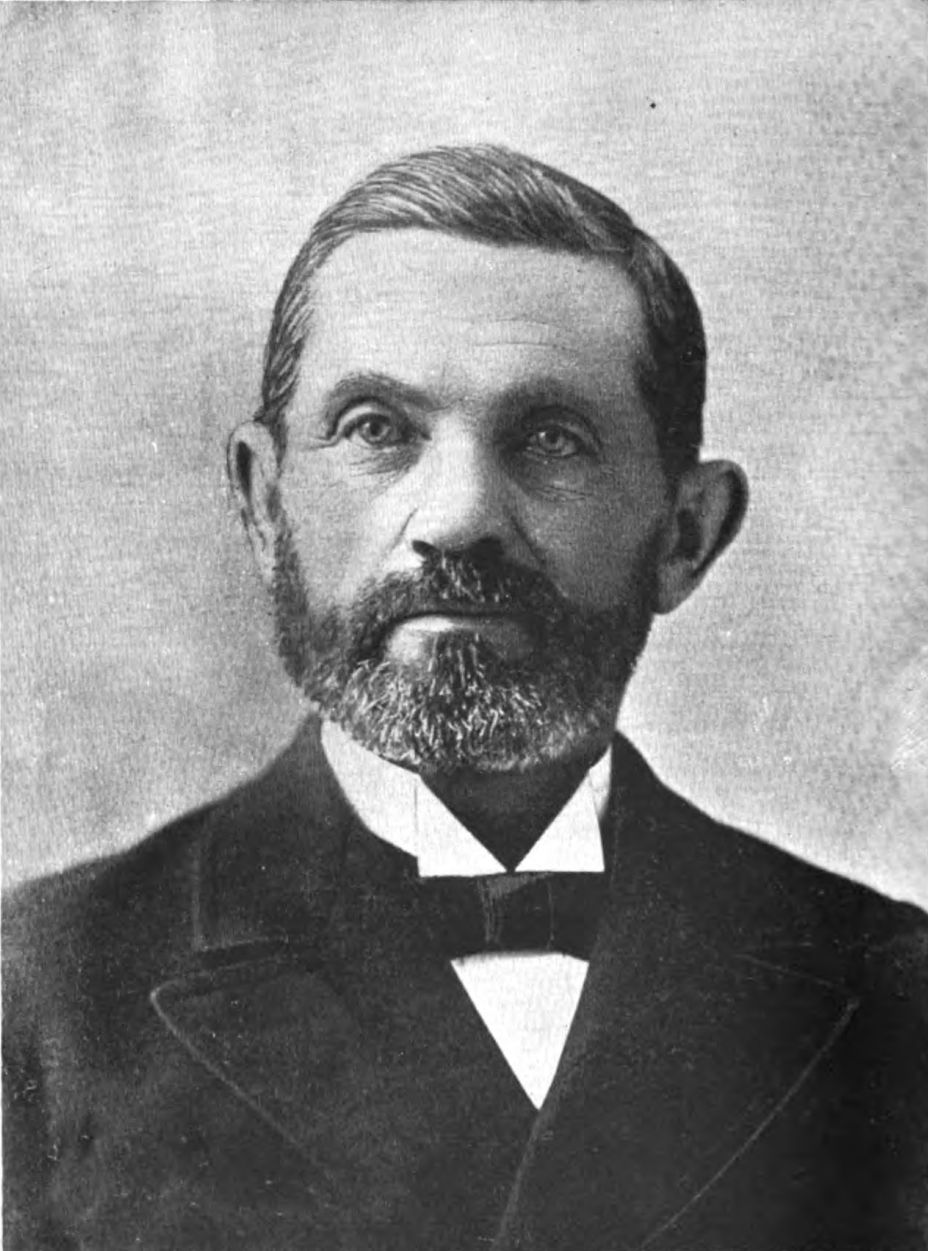
John Strong c. 1893

John Strong, Jr. (April 7, 1830 – April 2, 1913) was an American Democratic politician from the U.S. state of Michigan.

== Early life and family ==
Strong, the son of John Strong Sr. (1798–1881), from Wroxton, Oxfordshire, England, was a first generation American born in a log cabin in Greenfield Township, Michigan, which is now part of Detroit. He received a common school education and engaged in farming. In 1863, he moved to Monroe County where he founded South Rockwood and engaged in milling, manufacturing barrel staves, heading, lumber, merchandising, farming and raising cattle. During a sawmill accident, he lost two fingers on his right hand. He married Emily Buhl, the sister of two Detroit mayors, Frederick and Christian H. Buhl. His nephew John Strong Haggerty (1866–1950) served as Michigan Secretary of State from 1927 to 1931.

== Politics ==
In 1860, Strong was elected as a Democrat to the Michigan House of Representatives from Wayne County (2nd district), just as his father had been from 1835 to 1836, and served from 1861 to 1862. In 1878, he was again elected to the state house, yet instead from Monroe County (2nd district) and served from 1879 to 1880. In 1880, he was elected to the Michigan Senate from the 5th district and served from 1881 to 1884.

In 1890, Strong was elected as the 26th lieutenant governor of Michigan and served under Governor Edwin B. Winans from 1891 to 1893. He was the first Democrat to be elected to the office of lieutenant governor in Michigan since Andrew Parsons thirty-eight years earlier. In 1912, he served as an alternate delegate from Michigan to the Democratic National Convention which nominated for U. S. President Woodrow Wilson who won in the general election.

== Death ==
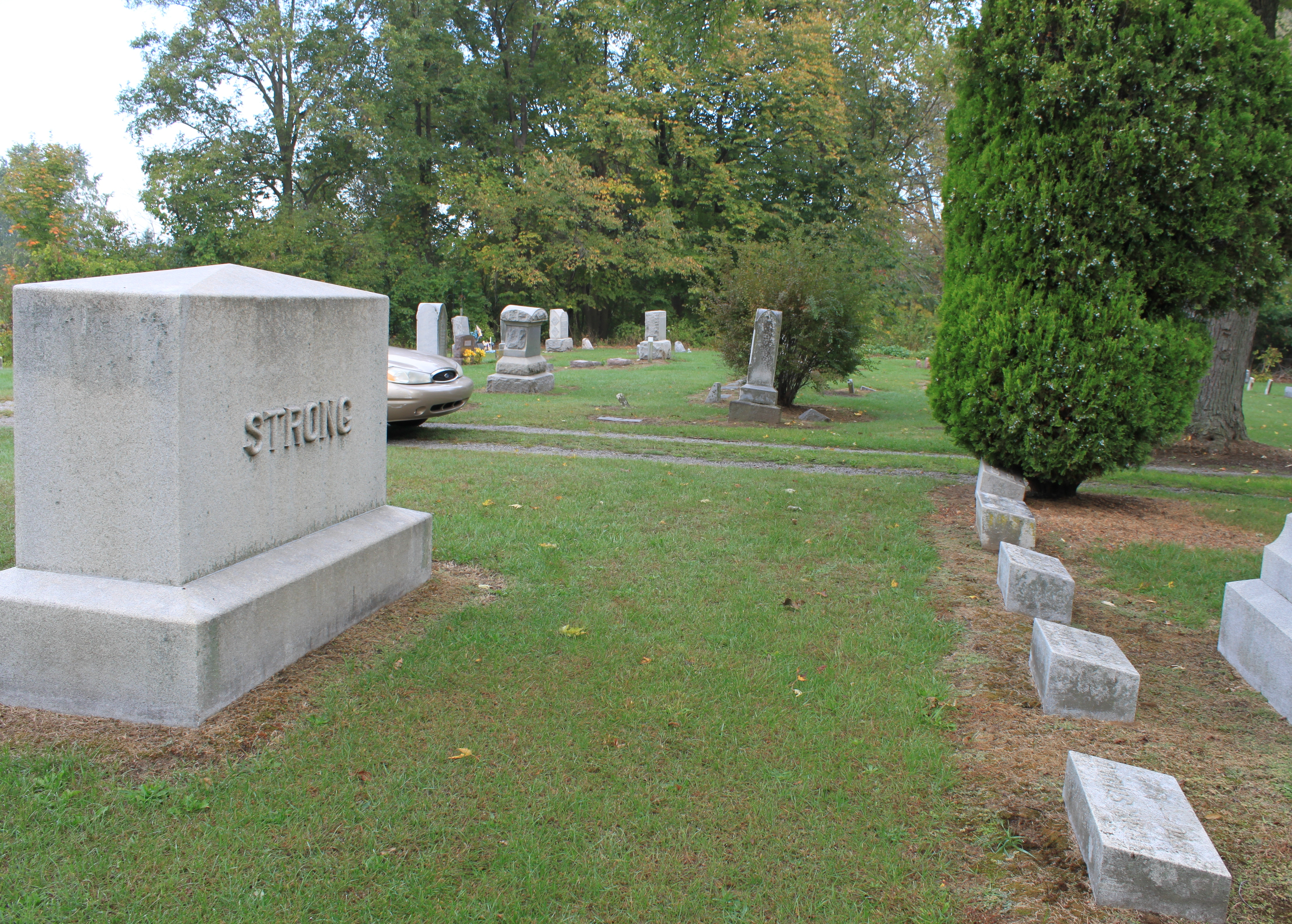
Strong family gravesite. John Strong's headstone is at the end of the row directly underneath an evergreen tree.

During his life Strong became a member of Freemasons. He died in South Rockwood just five days before his eighty-third birthday and one month after Wilson's first inauguration. He is interred at Riverside Cemetery of South Rockwood.

Political offices
Preceded by William Ball	Lieutenant Governor of Michigan; 1891–1893	Succeeded by J. Wight Giddings
