= John Strong Sr. =

American politician

John Strong

Member of the Michigan House of Representatives from the Wayne County district
- In office November 2, 1835 – January 1, 1837

Personal details
- Born: November 26, 1798 Wroxton, Oxfordshire, England
- Died: February 23, 1881 (aged 82) Greenfield Township, Michigan
- Party: Democratic

John Strong Sr. (November 26, 1798 – February 23, 1881) was an English–American farmer and politician who served one term in the Michigan House of Representatives, and was an early settler of Greenfield Township, Michigan.

== Biography ==
John Strong was born on November 26, 1798, in Wroxton, Oxfordshire, England. He studied for the ministry, but did not find it to his liking. After his father's death, he emigrated to the United States, arriving in the early 1820s, likely in 1825. He settled in Greenfield Township, Michigan (now within the city boundaries of Detroit) by 1826, after a year spent living near Chatham, Ontario. He was a farmer, and as one of the few educated men in the area, he assisted the Native American and French residents with business and legal matters, and he also sold many small tracts of land to incoming German colonists.

Strong was a Democrat, and was elected to the Michigan House of Representatives in the first election following adoption of the state constitution in 1835, and served through 1836. He was supervisor of Greenfield Township in 1836 and 1836.

Strong died in Greenfield Township on February 23, 1881,

=== Family ===
In 1827, Strong married Isabella Campbell, who was born in Scotland on January 25, 1810. They had six children: John Jr., Ann, George, Isabella, Elizabeth, and Sarah. Isabella Strong died on October 29, 1840.

John Strong Jr. was elected to both the state house and senate, and also served as lieutenant governor of Michigan. Elizabeth's son John S. Haggerty served as Michigan Secretary of State.
