= Springwells Township, Michigan =

- Former civil township
- Former location within the state of Michigan Former location within the United States
- Coordinates: 42°19′00″N 83°09′00″W
- Country: United States
- State: Michigan
- County: Wayne
- Organized: 1818
- Disestablished: 1926
- Time zone: UTC-5 (Eastern (EST))
  - Summer (DST): UTC-4 (EDT)

Springwells Township was a civil township in Wayne County, in the U.S. state of Michigan. All of the land is now incorporated as part of the cities of Detroit and Dearborn.

== History ==
Springwells Township was formed by an act of the territorial governor Lewis Cass on January 5, 1818, but the township was not organized until 1827, at which time it was bordered by Hamtramck Township and Detroit to the east, Oakland County to the north, Bucklin Township to the west (later Redford Township and Dearborn Township), Ecorse Township to the southwest, and the Detroit River to the southeast. In 1833, Greenfield Township was organized from northern and southwestern portions of Springwells, reducing its size significantly. In 1873, the part of Greenfield Township south of what would become Tireman Avenue was transferred to Springwells Township.

In 1842, the U.S. Army began construction of Fort Wayne at the Detroit River, now listed in the National Register of Historic Places.

The township was named for the many natural springs in the area. Earlier, French explorers had named the area "Belle-Fontaine," French for "Beautiful Fountain." In 1815, the "sand hill at Springwells" was the site of the signing of the Treaty of Springwells, which was attended by future U.S. President William Henry Harrison.

According to the research of author Richard Bak, there was a series of unsolved deaths in the 1880s that occurred under suspicious circumstances. These events have gone largely forgotten, but stand amongst Wayne County's greatest unsolved crimes of all time.

Springwells Township ceased to exist when the remainder was incorporated as a city in 1924.

== Settlements of the former Springwells Township ==
- Delray – incorporated as a village in November 1897. Together with Woodmere, the village was annexed to the City of Detroit in April 1906.
- Fort Wayne – surrounding area annexed by City of Detroit in 1885.
- Springwells – became a village in 1919, a city in 1924, renamed Fordson in 1925, consolidated with Dearborn in 1928.
- Woodmere – incorporated as a village in July 1901, and was located near the 250 acre Woodmere Cemetery that had been established following the American Civil War. Together with Delray, the village was annexed to City of Detroit in April 1906.

== Historical timeline ==
=== European exploration and colonization ===
- 1603 French lay claim to unidentified territory in this region, naming it New France.
- July 24, 1701 Antoine de la Mothe Cadillac and his soldiers first land at what is now Detroit.
- November 29, 1760 The British take control of the area from France.
- 1780 Pierre Dumais clears farm near what is today's Morningside Street in Dearborn's South End.

=== Early U.S. history ===
- 1783 – By terms of the Treaty of Paris ending the American Revolutionary War, Great Britain cedes territory south of the Great Lakes to the United States, although the British retain practical control of the Detroit area and several other settlements until 1797.
- 1787 – Territory of the US north and west of the Ohio River is officially proclaimed the Northwest Territory.
- December 26, 1791 – Detroit environs become part of Kent County, Ontario.
- 1796 – Wayne County is formed by proclamation of the acting governor of the Northwest Territory. Its original area is 2,000,000 square miles (5,200,000 km^{2}), stretching from Cleveland, Ohio, to Chicago, Illinois, and northwest to Canada.
- May 7, 1800 – Indiana Territory, created out of part of Northwest Territory, although the eastern half of Michigan including the Dearborn area, was not attached to Indiana Territory until Ohio was admitted as a state in 1803.
- January 11, 1805 – Michigan Territory officially created out of a part of the Indiana Territory.
- June 11, 1805 – Fire destroys most of Detroit.
- November 15, 1815 – Boundaries of Wayne County redrawn, county split into 18 townships.
- January 5, 1818 – Springwells Township established by Gov. Lewis Cass.
- October 23, 1824 – Bucklin Township created by Gov. Lewis Cass. The area ran from Greenfield to approximately Haggerty and from Van Born to Eight Mile.
- 1826 – Conrad Ten Eyck builds Ten Eyck Tavern at Michigan Avenue and Rouge River.
- 1827 – Wayne County's boundaries changed to its current 615 square miles (1,593 km^{2}).
- April 12, 1827 – Springwells and Bucklin townships formally organized and laid out by gubernatorial act.
- October 29, 1829 – Bucklin Township split along what is today Inkster Road into Nankin (west half) and Pekin (east half) townships.
- March 21, 1833 – Pekin Township renamed Redford Township.
- March 31, 1833 – Greenfield Township created from north and west sections of Springwells Township, including what is now today east Dearborn.
- April 1, 1833 – Dearborn Township created from southern half of Redford Township south of Bonaparte Avenue (Joy Road).
- October 23, 1834 – Dearborn Township renamed Bucklin Township.
- March 26, 1836 – Bucklin Township renamed Dearborn Township.
- January 26, 1837 – Michigan admitted to the Union as the 26th state. Stevens T. Mason is first governor.
- 1837 – Michigan Central Railroad extended through Springwells Township. Hamlet of Springwells rises along railroad.
- April 5, 1838 – Village of Dearbornville incorporates. Village later unincorporated on May 11, 1846.
- 1849 Detroit annexes Springwells Township east of Brooklyn Street.
- April 2, 1850 – Greenfield Township annexes another section of Springwells Township.
- February 12, 1857 – Detroit annexes Springwells Township east of Grand Boulevard.
- March 25, 1873 – A portion of Greenfield Township south of Tireman is transferred to Springwells Township.
- May 28, 1875 – Postmaster general changes name of Dearbornville post office to Dearborn post office, hence changing the city's name.
- 1875 – Detroit annexes another section of Springwells Township.
- June 20, 1884 – Detroit annexes Springwells Township east of Livernois.

=== Incorporation as village ===
- March 24, 1893 Village of Dearborn incorporates.
- 1906 Detroit annexes another section of Springwells Township.
- 1916 Detroit annexes more of Springwells Township, forming Dearborn's eastern boundary.
- December 9, 1919 Springwells Township incorporates as the Village of Springwells.
- October 16, 1922 Springwells Township (Village?) annexes small section of Dearborn Township east of present-day Greenfield Road.
- December 27, 1923 Voters approve incorporation of the City of Springwells. It officially became a city April 7, 1924.
- September 9, 1924 Village of Warrendale incorporates.
- April 6, 1925 Warrendale voters and residents of remaining Greenfield Township approve annexation by Detroit.
- May 26, 1925 The Village of Dearborn annexes most of Dearborn Township.
- December 23, 1925 The City of Springwells changes its name to the City of Fordson.
- September 14, 1926 Election approves incorporation of village of Inkster from an eastern portion of Nankin Township and a western portion of Dearborn Township, causing the unincorporated part of Dearborn Township to be separated into two unconnected sections.

=== Formation of Dearborn's Historic Springwells Park Neighborhood ===
On February 14, 1927, Village of Dearborn residents voted to become a city. The following year on June 12, 1928, voters approved consolidation of the City of Dearborn (population 9,000), City of Fordson (population 33,000) and part of Dearborn Township consolidated into the City of Dearborn. On January 9, 1929, Clyde M. Ford was elected as the first mayor of Dearborn. The Historic Springwells Park Neighborhood was established in 1939 by Edsel B. Ford to provide company executives and auto workers with upscale housing accommodations.

== Notable natives ==
- Eddie Cicotte, baseball pitcher and member of the Black Sox who threw the 1919 World Series
- Henry Ford, American industrialist and founder of Ford Motor Company.
