= Fort Wayne (Detroit) =

- U.S. National Register of Historic Places
- Michigan State Historic Site
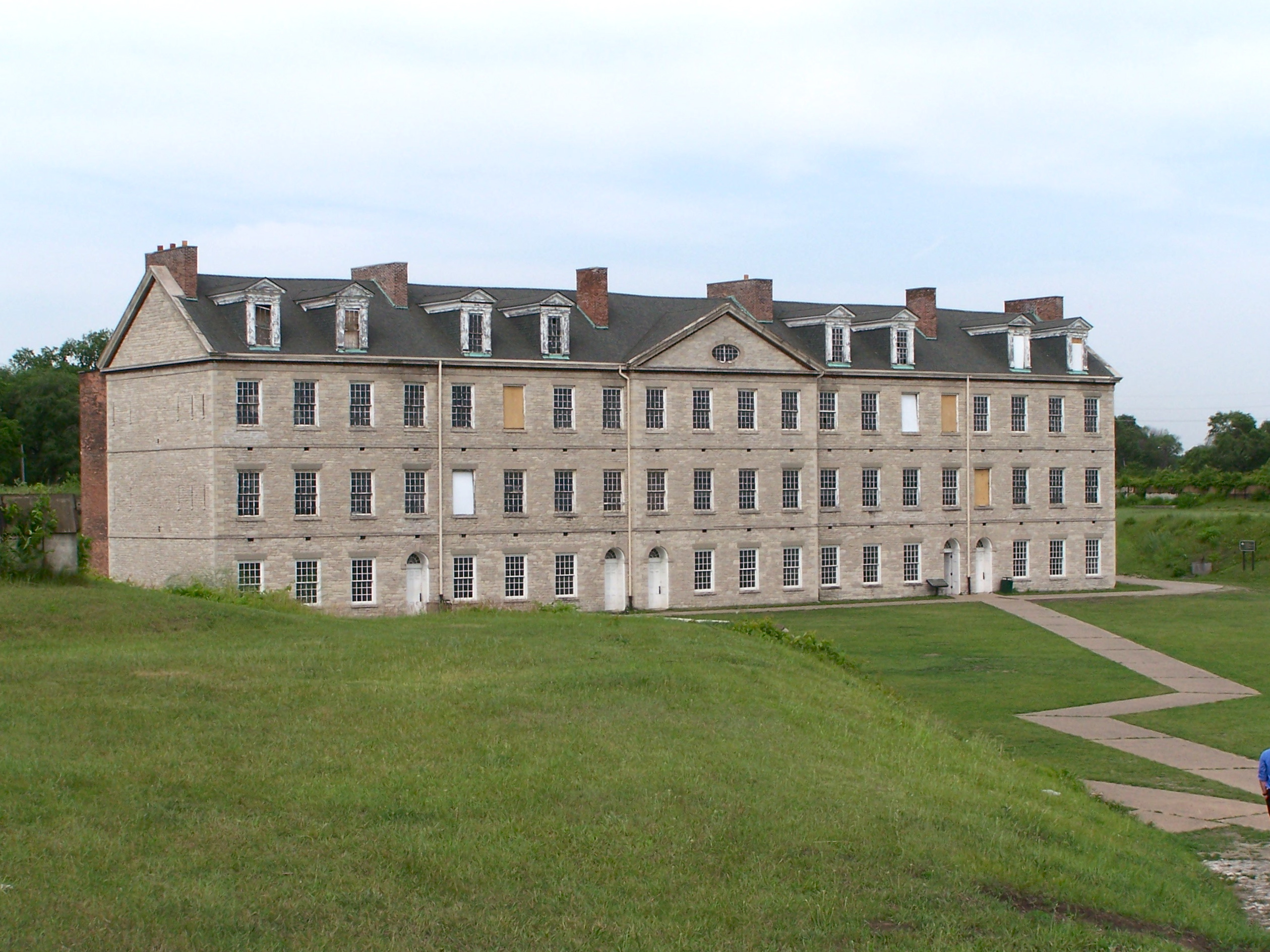
- Original barracks at Fort Wayne
- Interactive map
- Location: 6053 West Jefferson Avenue; Detroit, Michigan
- Coordinates: 42°17′57″N 83°05′50″W
- Area: 96 acres (39 ha)
- Built: 1842–51
- Architect: Montgomery C. Meigs
- NRHP reference No.: 71000425

Significant dates
- Added to NRHP: May 6, 1971
- Designated MSHS: February 19, 1958

Fort Wayne is located in the city of Detroit, Michigan, at the foot of Livernois Avenue in the Delray neighborhood. The fort is situated on the Detroit River at a point where it is under half a mile to the Ontario shore. The original 1848 limestone barracks (with later brick additions) still stands, as does the 1845 fort (renovated in 1863 with brick exterior facing). On the grounds but outside the original fort are additional officers quarters, a recreation building, a theater, commissary, guard house, garage, and stables. A large warehouse and the post fire station were torn down in 1976 and the two-story hospital was torn down in 2007.

The fort's original extent was 96 acres (39 ha). Since the 1970s, 83 acres (34 ha), including the original fort and a number of buildings, has been operated by the city of Detroit. The remaining area is operated by the U.S. Army Corps of Engineers as a boatyard. The fort was designated a Michigan State Historic Site in 1958, listed on the National Register of Historic Places in 1971, and designated as a City of Detroit Historic Neighborhood District in 2016.

== Background ==
Fort Wayne is Detroit's third fort. The first, Fort Pontchartrain du Detroit, was built by the French in 1701 near current day Hart Plaza. This fort, built by Cadillac, was manned by the French until they surrendered it to the British in 1760 during the French and Indian War. The British constructed the second fort, Fort Lernoult, a few years later, centered on current day Fort and Shelby streets. They manned the post until 1796 when the United States assumed control over the site and renamed it Fort Shelby. Following the end of the War of 1812, Fort Shelby fell into disrepair, and in 1826 the City of Detroit purchased and demolished it.

The site of Fort Wayne originally consisted of a high sand mound with freshwater springs along the marshy waterfront of the Detroit River; it is from this geography that Springwells Township (later annexed into the City of Detroit) took its name. The site has a history going back to at least 750 AD. Approximately 19 Native American burial mounds were present in the immediate area, as well as a larger mound at the mouth of the Rouge River. The present bastioned fort was built atop one of these burial mounds. In the early 20th century, the sole remaining burial mound at Fort Wayne was excavated by archaeologists from the University of Michigan and was found to contain human remains dating over 900 years old. A type of pottery found there is unique to the site; it was subsequently dubbed "Wayne Ware."

When Cadillac founded Fort Pontchartrain, later known as Fort Detroit, he also purportedly made arrangements with the local Potawatomi people to set up a village at the future site of Fort Wayne for purposes of trading; this was occupied and thriving by 1710.

The opening shots of the War of 1812 were fired in the vicinity of the fort's future site, the "sand hill at Springwells". Although war had not yet been officially declared, Michigan militiamen bombarded the town of Sandwich, Upper Canada (later annexed into Windsor), on July 4, 1812. Later in the course of the war, British general Isaac Brock crossed the narrowest part of the Detroit River with his troops and landed on the future Fort Wayne site before marching to Detroit. In the ensuing Siege of Detroit, American general William Hull, believing himself completely surrounded and outnumbered, surrendered Fort Shelby to the British without offering any resistance. The British later abandoned the fort and American troops reoccupied it. In 1815, the future Fort Wayne site was where American government and the local Native American tribal leaders met to sign the Treaty of Springwells, which marked the end of hostilities between the government and tribes that allied with the British during the war. Among those present for the signing of the treaty were territorial governor Lewis Cass and General William Henry Harrison.

In the late 1830s, small, short-lived rebellions occurred in Canada to protest corruption within its colonial government. Many Americans believed there was widespread Canadian support for these rebellions and formed volunteer militias to overthrow Canada's colonial government. This led to a series of militia attacks on Canada known as the Patriot War. American troops were mustered to suppress the American volunteers and maintain America's official neutrality in the conflict. However, at the same time, the United States government realized there was a lack of fortifications along the northern border to repel a potential British attack, and in particular, no counterpart to the British Fort Malden located in Amherstburg. In 1841, Congress appropriated funds to build a chain of forts stretching from the east coast to the Minnesota Territory, including one at Detroit..

Soon afterward, the Army sent Lieutenant Montgomery C. Meigs to Detroit. Meigs bought riverfront farm property three miles below Detroit, in Springwells Township, at the point on the Detroit River closest to Canada. Construction of the fort began in 1842, with Meigs overseeing. The original fortifications were cedar-revetted earthen walls. The fort was completed in 1851 at a cost of $150,000. The Army named the new fort for Revolutionary War hero General "Mad" Anthony Wayne, who had taken possession of Detroit from the British in 1796.

== Architecture and construction ==
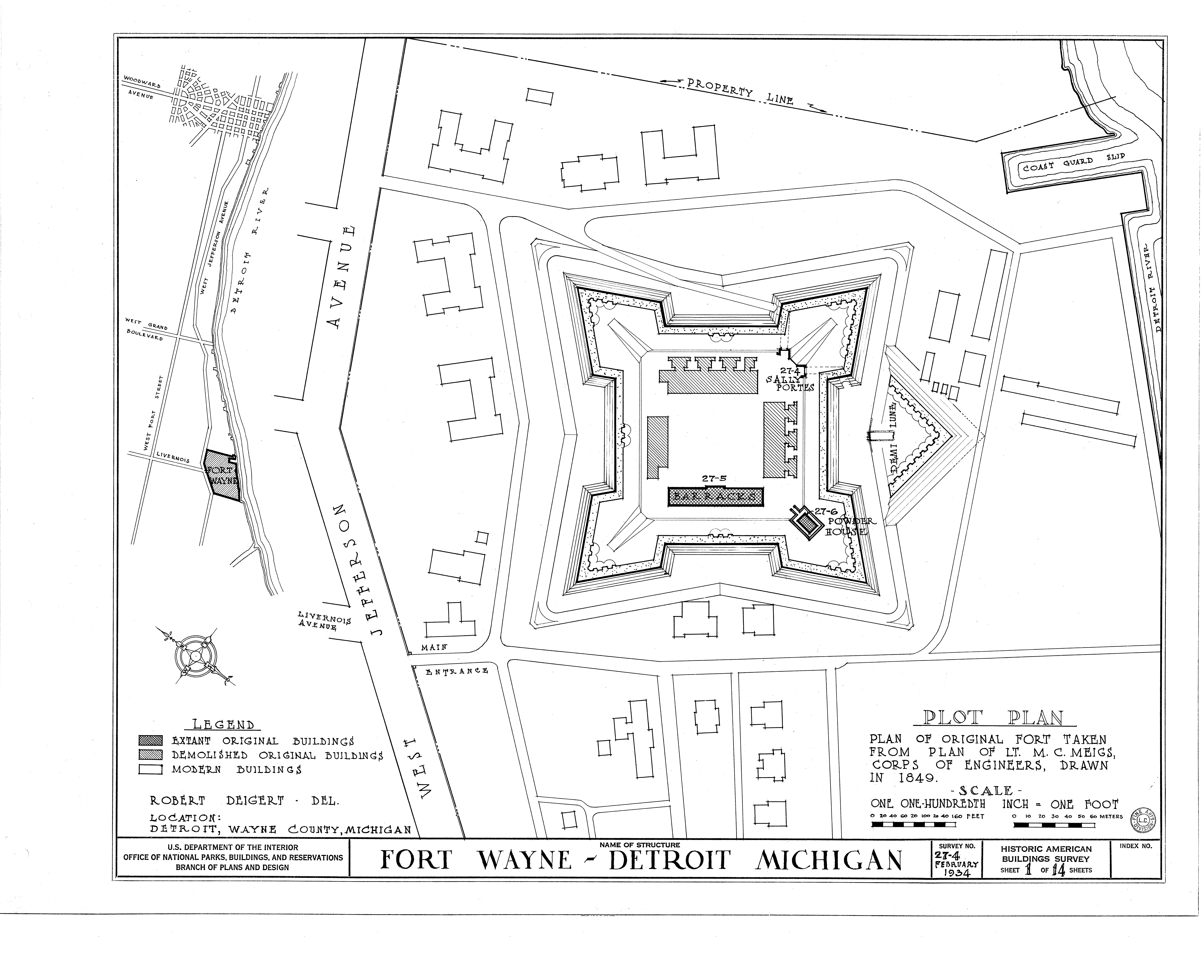
Original layout of Fort Wayne

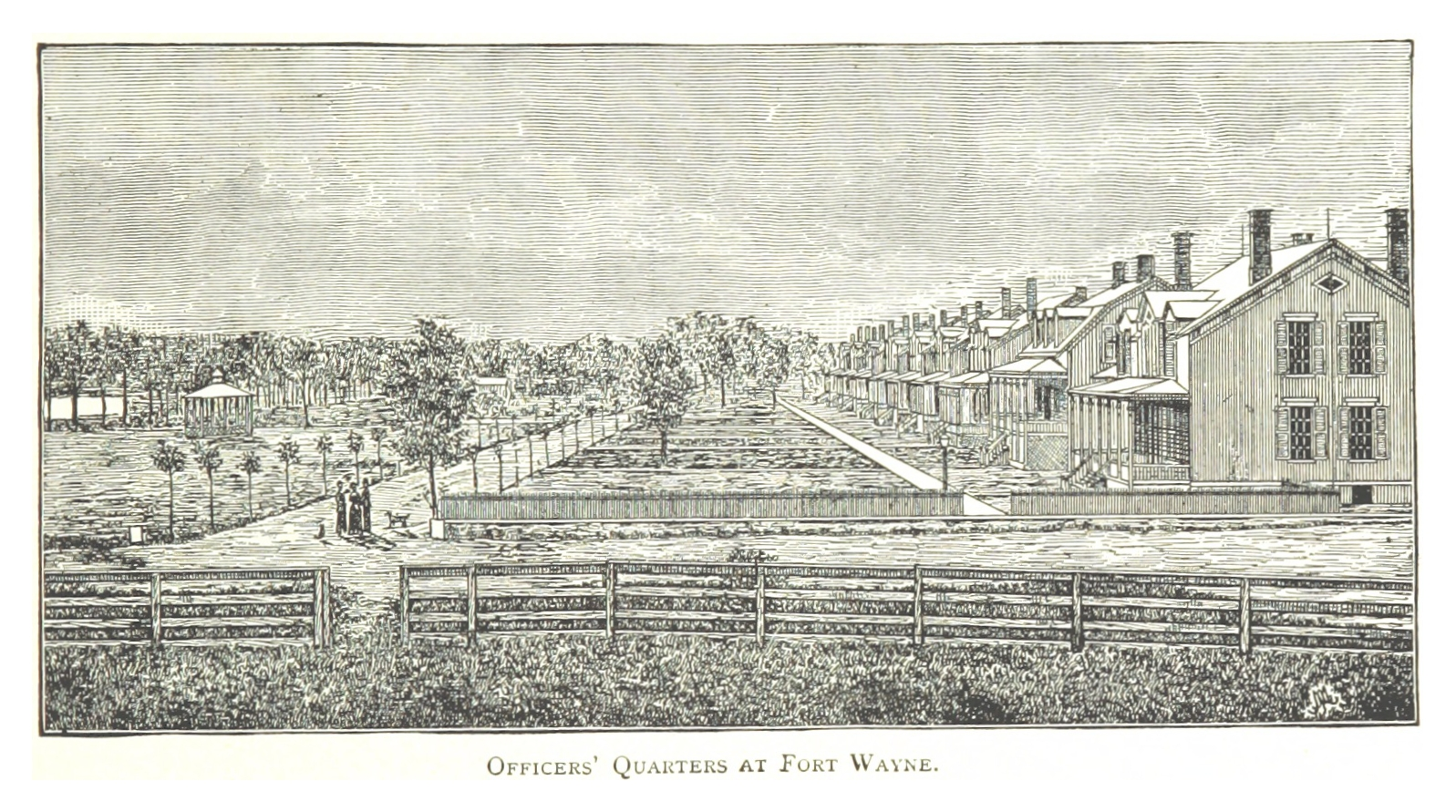
The Officers' Quarters in an 1884 drawing by Silas Farmer

The original fort is a bastioned rectangle with walls of earthen ramparts faced with cedar, covering vaulted brick casemates that contain embrasures (openings) for antipersonnel flank howitzers. The design was based on fortifications developed by Sebastian Vauban, a 17th-century French military engineer, and taught by Dennis Hart Mahan at the U.S. Military Academy. Artillery emplacements are atop the walls, designed for 10-inch (250 mm) cannon mounted to fire over the parapet, although there is no indication that artillery intended for the fort was ever installed. There is a dry moat surrounding the fort, and a demilune facing the river.

Although the fort today is substantially similar to the original construction, some changes have been made. Starting in 1863, under the supervision of Thomas J. Cram, the walls of the fort were reconstructed, replacing the original cedar facing with brick. The new scarp (outside wall) used the semi-detached scarp concept developed by French engineer Lazare Carnot. His concepts were also used in the gently-sloping counterscarp embankment, designed to facilitate counterattacks during a siege. While the original sally port in the southeast bastion still exists, a motor gate was added in 1938. This arched entrance was constructed through the fort's walls to accommodate vehicular traffic; later, the arches were removed to fit larger trucks.

Within the fort (and built at approximately the same time) is a Federal style, 3 1/2-story limestone troop barracks, consisting of five independent but adjacent sections - each intended to house one company. Each section contains a ground floor mess, two floors of barracks rooms, and an attic. Brick additions were added to the rear of the building in 1861, housing washrooms and kitchens. Next to the barracks is a powder magazine, also constructed of limestone. Additional buildings originally built within the fort, such as officer's housing, have long since been destroyed.

Numerous additional buildings have been built on fort grounds outside of the fort. A row of wooden Victorian officer's homes was built in the 1880s. In 1937, these homes were completely refurbished and clad in brick by WPA workers. One home was restored in the 1980s to its original appearance. A Spanish–American War guardhouse, built in 1889, is in the center of the fort grounds. The guard house was restored in 1984. In 1890, a brick hospital was built, with a later addition in 1898. In 1905, a new guardhouse, still in use today, was built near the gate to the fort grounds. Around the same time, four barracks buildings for enlisted men were built, as well as a service club (1903), headquarters (1905), and post office. By 1928, duplex housing for senior NCOs had been constructed. In 1939, more NCO houses were built in a row facing Jefferson Avenue.

== Historical use ==
=== Construction to the American Civil War ===
Before any cannon had been installed at the newly constructed Fort Wayne, the United States and Britain peacefully resolved their differences, eliminating the need for a fort on the Detroit River. Fort Wayne remained unused for a decade after its initial construction, manned only by a single watchman. There is evidence suggesting that the fort was a final stop on the Underground Railroad during these dormant years, as the Irish farmer who lived next to the fort's demilune operated a small ferry to Canada to supplement his income, the only such ferry in this part of the city at that time.

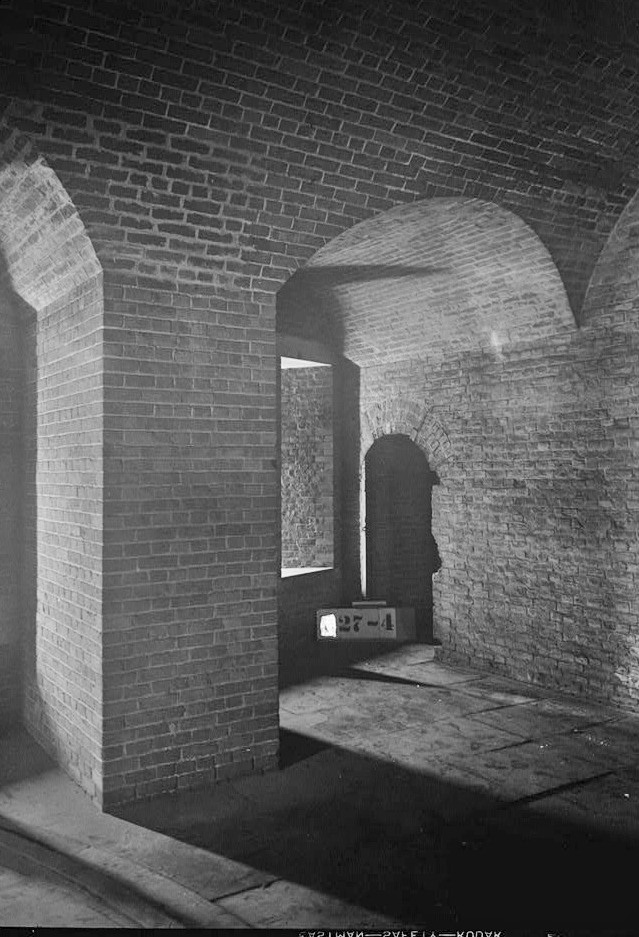
Gun emplacement, 1934

In 1861, the American Civil War again made Fort Wayne relevant. British sympathy for the Confederacy renewed fears of an attack from Canada, leading to a reconstruction and strengthening of the fort walls. Two weeks after the beginning of the war, the Michigan 1st Volunteer Infantry Regiment was mustered into service at Fort Wayne. For the rest of the Civil War, the fort served as a mustering center for troops from Michigan, as well as a place for veterans to recover from their wounds. Alfred Gibbs was the first commander to occupy the fort, serving his parole at Fort Wayne after being captured by the Confederacy.

=== Spanish-American War ===
After the Civil War, Fort Wayne served as a garrison post, with regiments rotated from the western frontier for rest. In 1875, the city of Detroit annexed a portion of Springwells Township; in 1884, it annexed more of Springwells Township east of Livernois Avenue, including all land adjacent to Fort Wayne.

During the Spanish–American War, troops from the fort headed to Cuba and the Philippines. The fort's guardhouse also housed the first telephone exchange in southwestern Detroit.

=== World Wars I and II ===
During the Red Scare following World War I, the fort served as a temporary detention center for accused communists awaiting trial. During the Great Depression, the fort was opened to homeless families and it housed the Civilian Conservation Corps.

During World War I, Fort Wayne had become instrumental in the acquisition of cars, trucks, and spare parts for the military. This motor vehicle supply function reached its peak in World War II, when Fort Wayne was designated Motor Supply Depot and additional buildings were constructed for warehousing and shipping. At that time, the Fort Wayne Ordance Depot was the largest motor supply depot in the entire world, the command center controlling the flow of materiel from the automobile factories to the citywide network of storage and staging facilities, which included the Michigan State Fairgrounds, and the Port of Detroit terminal. Every single tank, truck, jeep, tire, or spare part that was sent to the fronts of World War II from the Detroit factories came through Fort Wayne. At that time, there was a railroad spur along the riverfront, docks for large ships, and over 2,000 (mostly civilian women) workers were employed; the drivers and mechanics of the Red Ball Express were also trained here. Fort Wayne served as home to Italian prisoners of war (POWs) captured during the North African Campaign, who were employed as servants, cooks, and janitors. After Italy's surrender, the POWs were given the chance to return to Italy, but many chose to remain and settle in Detroit.

=== Cold War Era ===
At the end of World War II, plans were made to close the fort. In 1948, the fort and original barracks were turned over to the City of Detroit's Historical Commission for operation as a military museum. In the 1950s, anti-aircraft guns were installed at the fort, later upgraded to Nike-Ajax missiles. During the Cold War, Fort Wayne served as an entrance station for the armed services, with thousands of enlistees and draftees being sworn in during the Korean War and Vietnam War. The fort was again used to provide housing to displaced families after the 1967 12th Street Riot, with the last families staying at the fort until 1971.

The remainder of Fort Wayne was turned over piecemeal to the city of Detroit, with the last bit of property delivered in 1976 as part of the Federal Lands to Parks program.

== Current use ==
From 1949 until 2006, the Fort Wayne Military Museum was operated by the Detroit Historical Museum. Since early 2006, the fort has been operated by the Detroit Recreation Department, assisted by the Historic Fort Wayne Coalition, and the Detroit Historical Society.

The fort hosts historic reenactments, soccer league matches, and other events. Areas can be rented for special events such as family reunions. Also on the grounds are the remaining ancient Native American burial mound and, formerly, the Tuskegee Airmen National Historical Museum.

Detroit City Football Club (DCFC) played their first match in 2012 at Historic Fort Wayne. Their adult recreation league currently plays on the soccer fields.

Spurred in part by construction of the new Gordie Howe International Bridge, nearby, the fort has been studied for possible inclusion in the national park system. The National Park Service has previously assisted in identifying ways to preserve the fort and draw visitors. Among the possibilities, the fort could become part of River Raisin National Battlefield Park, based in Monroe, to the southwest.

In 2019, Fort Wayne hosted the Finish Line of the 31st season (subtitled Reality Showdown) of the long-running CBS's reality competition The Amazing Race.

== Gallery ==
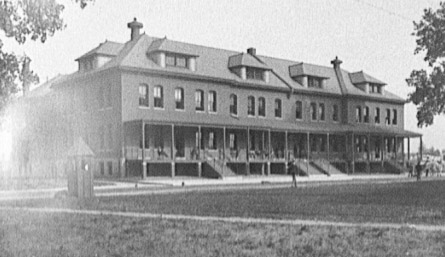
Officers' Quarters, c. 1900

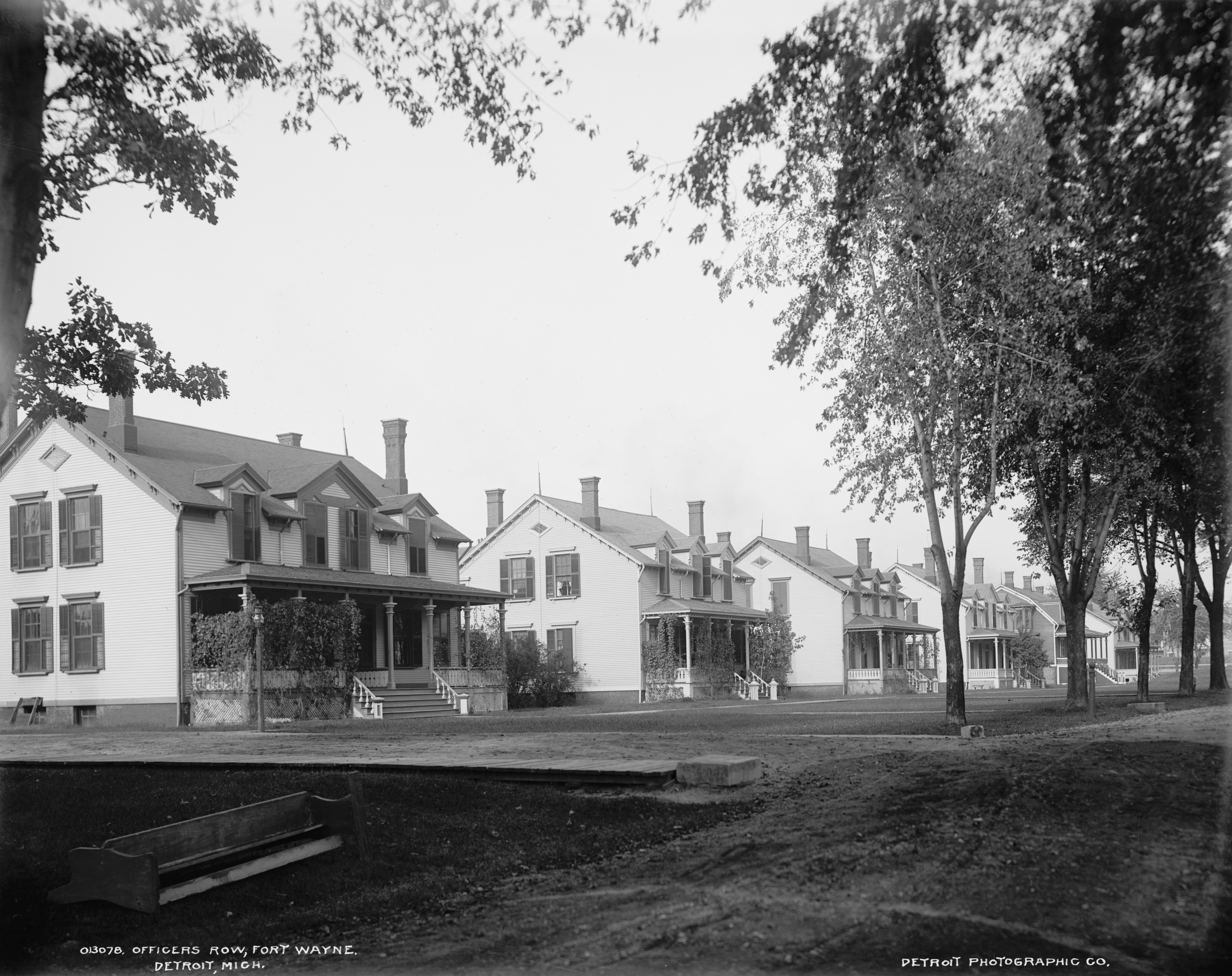
Officers' Row, c. 1900

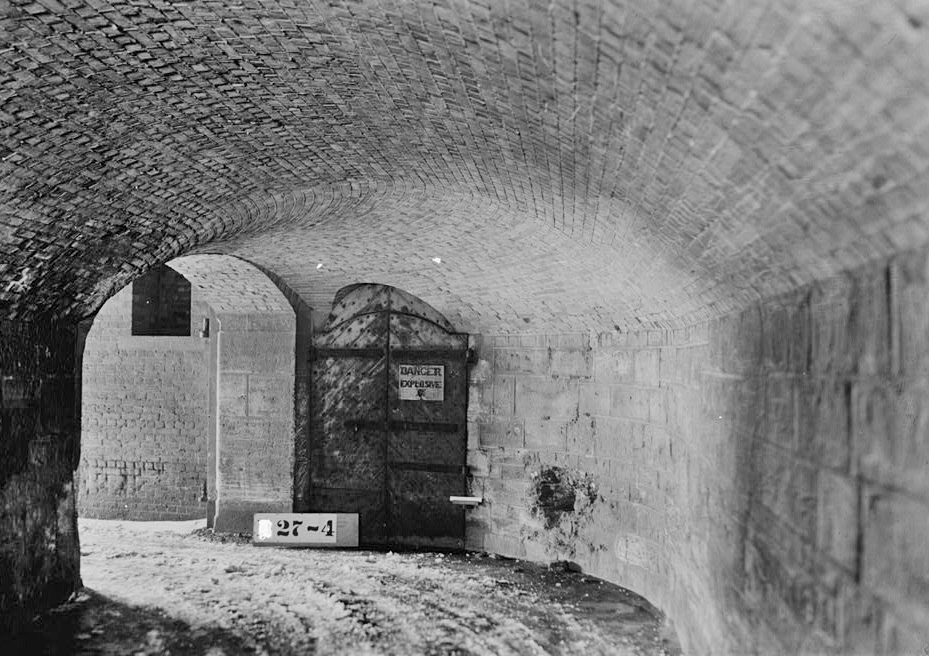
Sally Port, 1934

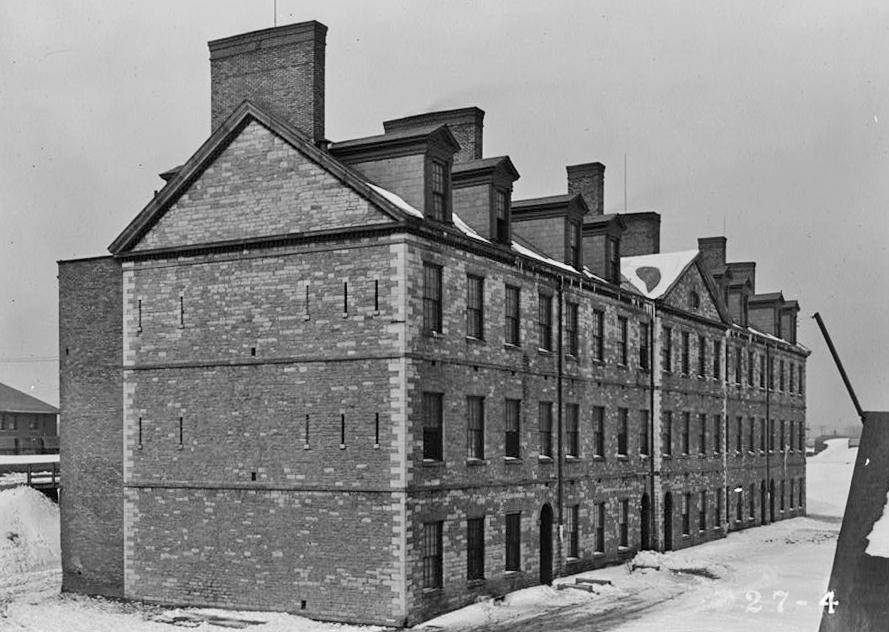
Fort Wayne Barracks, 1934

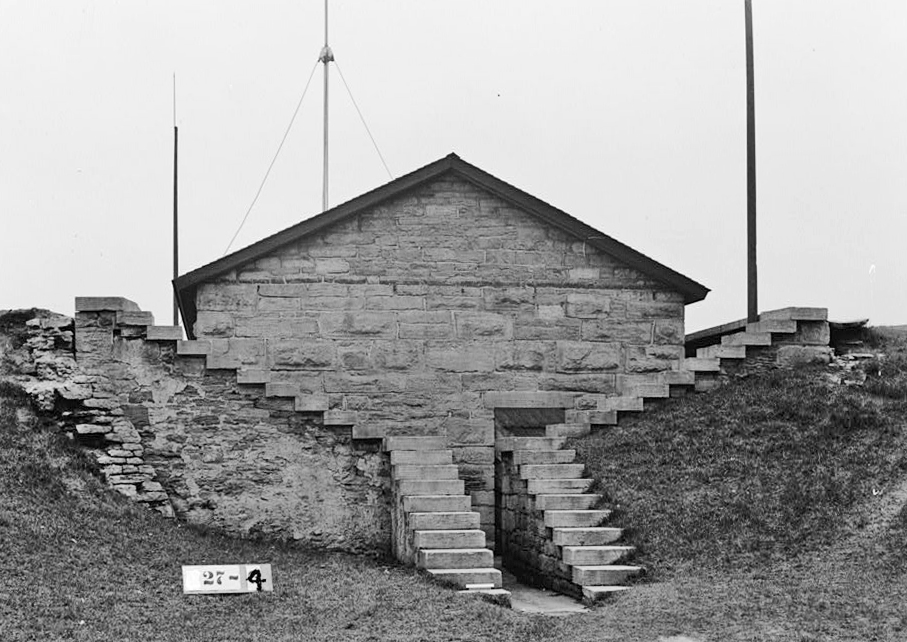
Powder House, 1934

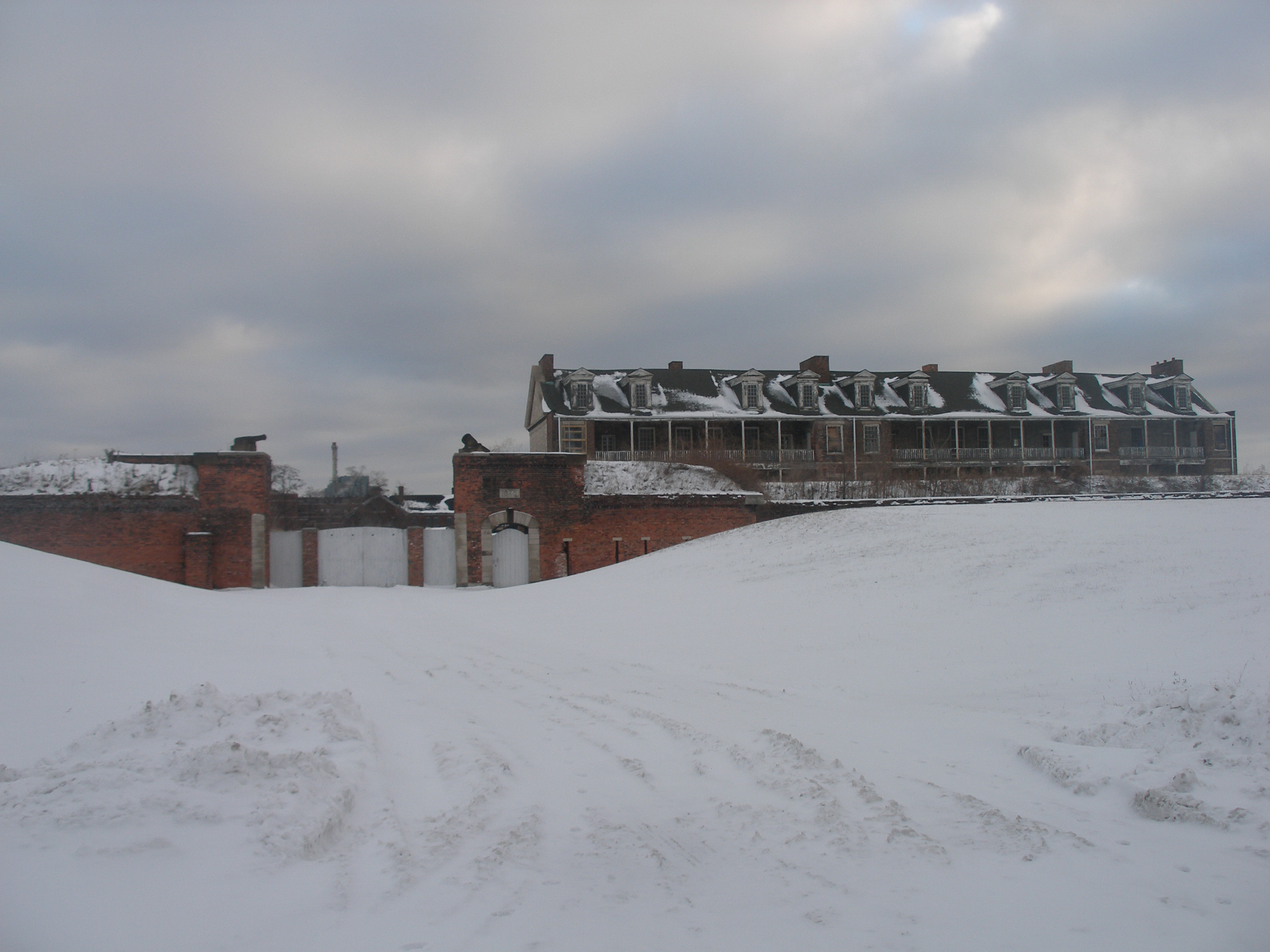
Main Barracks in January 2011

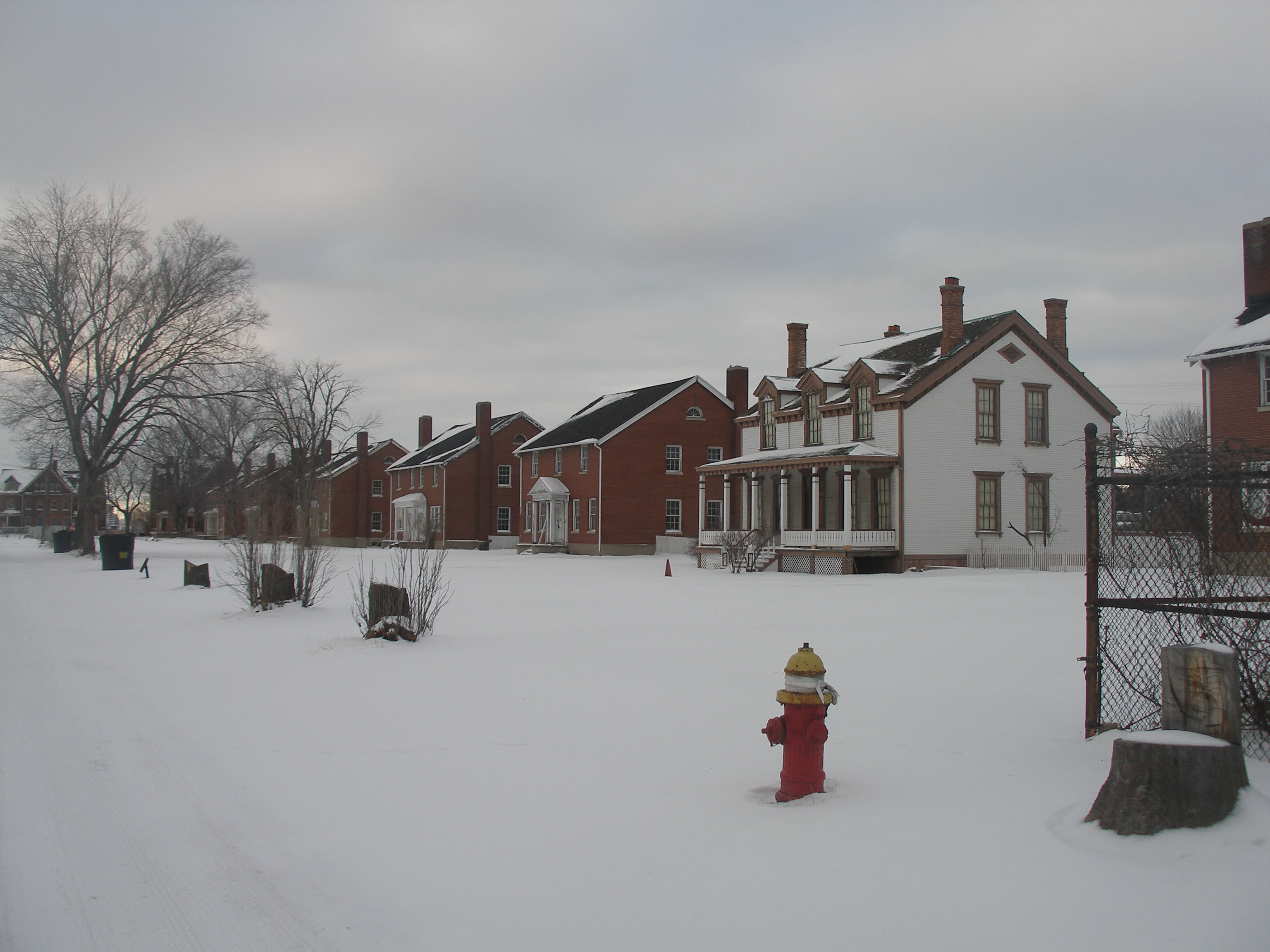
Officers' Row in January 2011

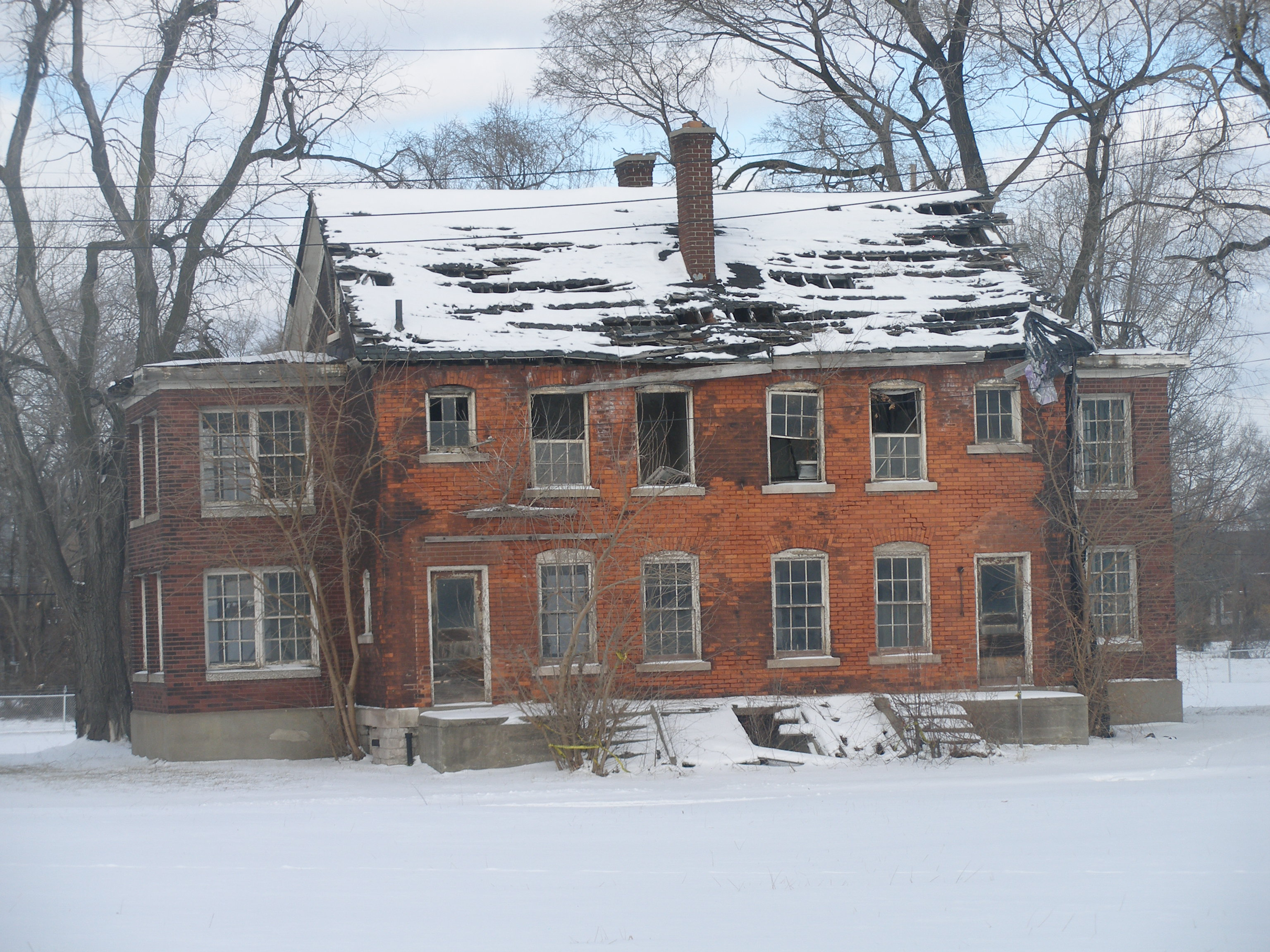
A building on Officers' Row in disrepair. January 2011

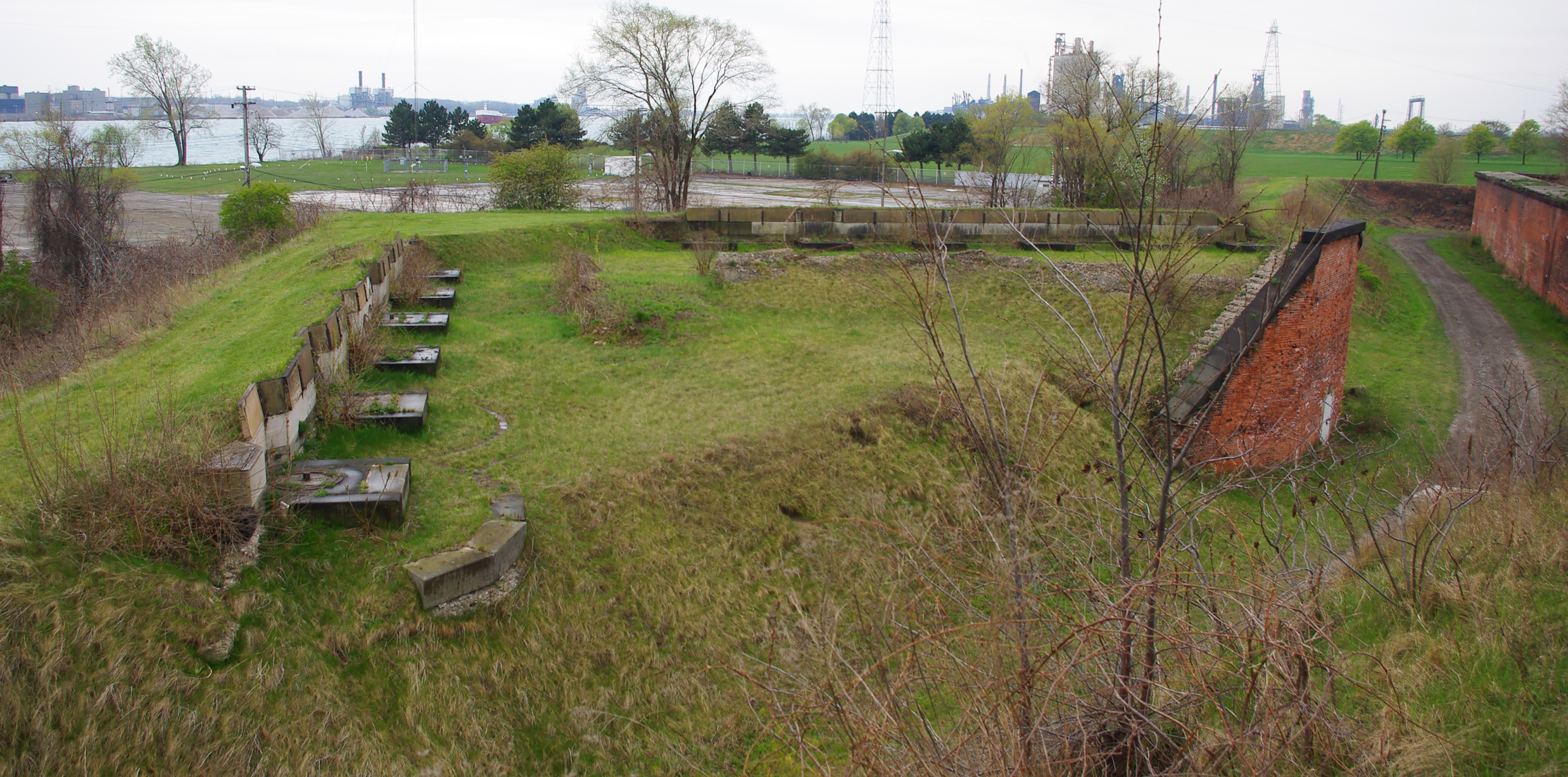
Ravelin (demilune), 2021
