= Treaty of Greenville (1814) =

1814 treaty between the United States and Native Americans

The Treaty of Greenville (1814) was called A treaty of peace and friendship between the United States of America and the tribes of Native Americans called the Wyandots, Delawares, Shawanoese, Senacas and Miamies. It was concluded at Greenville, Ohio on July 22, 1814, to provide peace among the tribes, and with the U.S., as well as an alliance between these Tribes and the U.S. against Great Britain during the War of 1812.

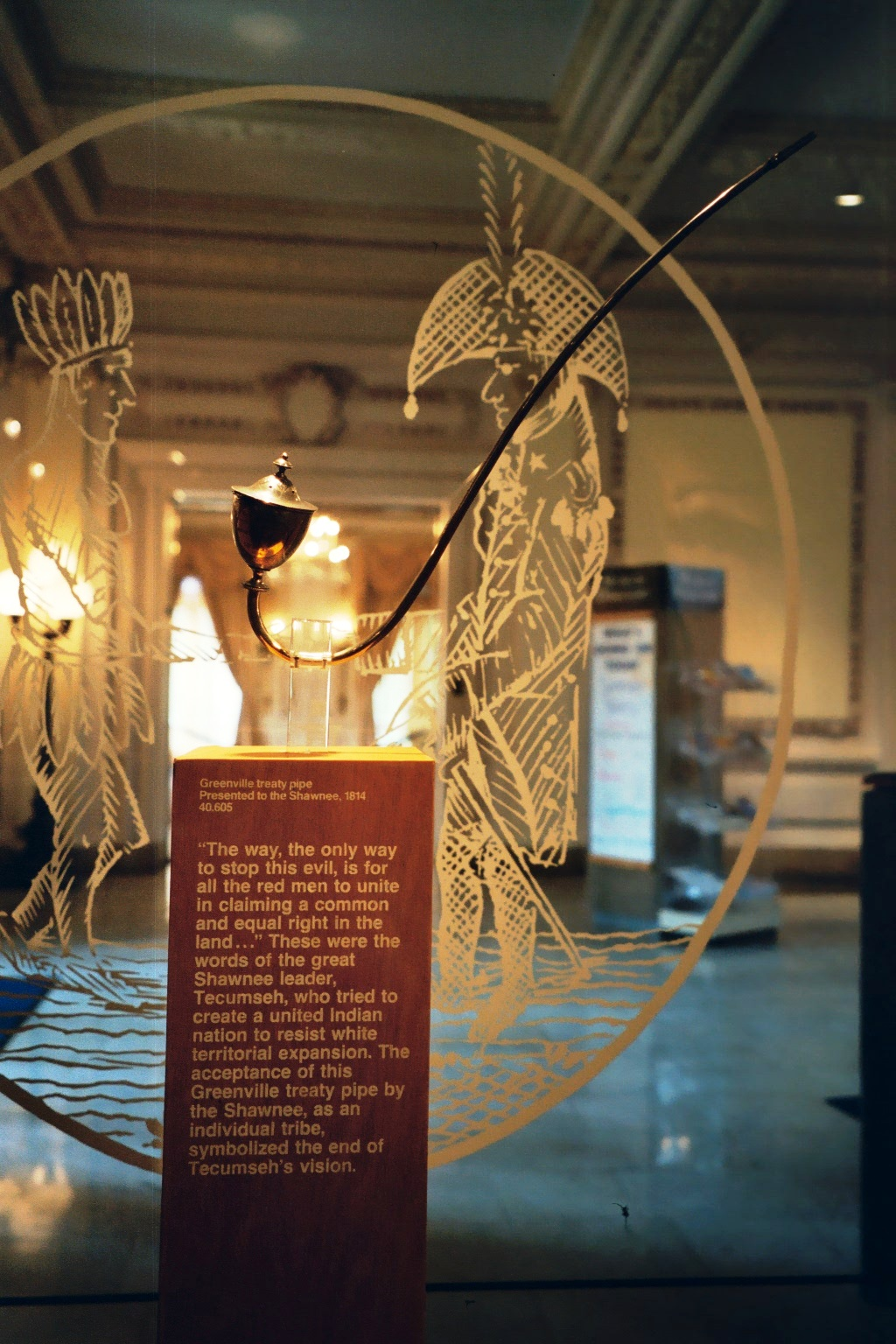
A pipe presented to the Shawnees at the Treaty of Greenville in 1814

== Terms ==
Article I established peace between the Miami, Potawatomi, Ottawa, and Kickapoo with the U.S., Wyandot, Delaware, Shawnee, and Seneca. Article II called for the tribes to give aid to the U.S. in the war against Great Britain and its Native American allies and not to make an independent peace. Article III had the tribes acknowledge themselves under the protection of the U.S. and no other power. In Article IV, the U.S. promised to respect their boundaries with the Native American Nations established before the war if the other conditions of the treaty were performed.

== See also ==
- List of Indian treaties
- Treaty of Spring Wells
