= Treaty of Spring Wells =

1815 treaty between the United States and Native Americans

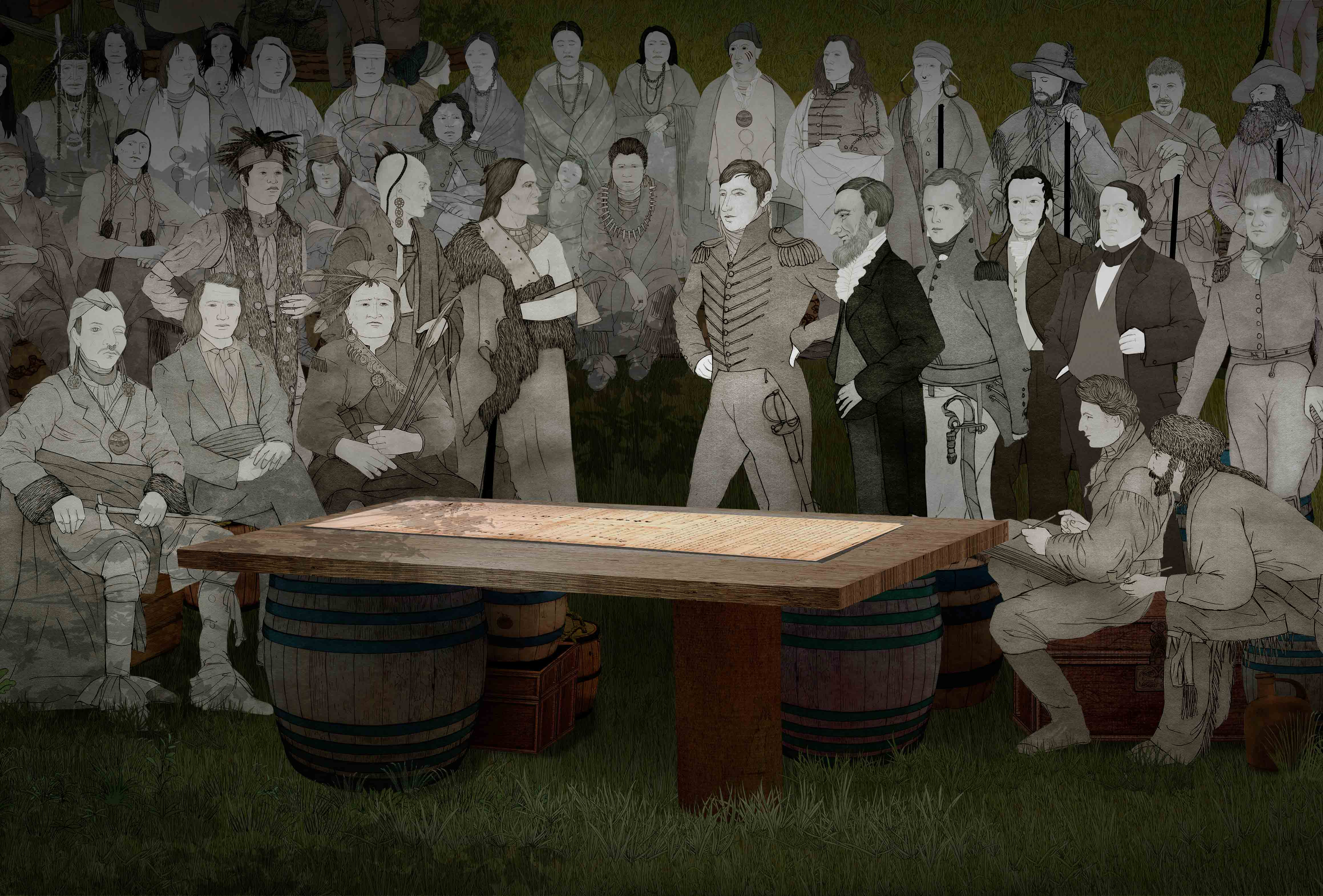
Reconstruction of the negotiations, made by the Valencian Museum of Ethnology.

The Treaty of Spring Wells was an agreement between the United States and the Wyandot, Lenape, Seneca, Shawnee, Miami, Ojibwe, Odawa, and Potawatomi Native Americans, ending the conflict between the U.S. and these Native Americans that was part of the War of 1812. It was signed on September 8, 1815, at the present site of the Fort Wayne historical site in Detroit, Michigan.

The object of the treaty was to absolve the Native Americans for supporting Great Britain in the War of 1812 and secure their future allegiance to the United States. The treaty officially ended all hostilities between the U.S. and the Native Americans, and reaffirmed the 1795 Treaty of Greenville, "and all subsubsequent treaties to which they were, respectively, parties." The U.S. agreed to restore to the Native Americans all of their possessions, rights, and privileges as of 1811. In return, the Native Americans agreed to place themselves under the protection of the U.S. government only, and repudiate any association with Britain.

The U.S. also "agree[d] to pardon such of the chiefs and warriors of said tribes as may have continued hostilities against them until the close of the war with Great Britain."

The negotiations for the U.S. were conducted by treaty commissioners William Henry Harrison, Duncan McArthur and John Graham. Native leaders who signed the treaty included Tarhe (Wyandot), Pacanne (Miami), and Black Hoof (Shawnee).

== See also ==
- List of Native American treaties
- Treaty of Greenville (1814)
