= Greenfield Township, Michigan =

- Former civil township
- Former location within the state of Michigan Former location within the United States
- Coordinates: 42°24′00″N 83°10′00″W
- Country: United States
- State: Michigan
- County: Wayne
- Organized: 1833
- Disestablished: 1926
- Time zone: UTC-5 (Eastern (EST))
  - Summer (DST): UTC-4 (EDT)

Greenfield was a civil township of Wayne County, Michigan; it was created from a portion of neighboring Springwells Township in 1833. Greenfield eventually encompassed the survey township T1S R11E. It even had its own police force. By 1875, a series of annexations to Detroit and Highland Park had begun; by 1926, the township of Greenfield had ceased to exist.

Today, Greenfield Road follows the former western township boundary between Greenfield and Redford Township. 8 Mile road was the northern boundary of Greenfield Township. Tireman Avenue follows the former southern boundary between Greenfield and Springwells Township.

== Settlements of the former Greenfield Township ==
- Cassandra
- Greenfield
- Howlett
- Sherwood
- Strathmoor
- Whitewood (later Highland Park)
- Yew

== Noteworthy ==
In 1863, American industrialist Henry Ford was born in southern Greenfield Township; Ford's future wife, Clara Jane Bryant, was born four miles to the north, in 1866. The Bryant home stood at the intersection of Greenfield Road and Grand River Avenue.
