= Indiana Territory in the War of 1812 =

History of Indiana
- The seal of Indiana reflects the state's pioneer era

Historical Periods
- Pre-history: until 1670
- French Rule: 1679–1763
- British Rule: 1763–1783
- U.S. Territorial Period: 1783–1816
- Indiana Statehood: 1816–present

Major Events
- Tecumseh's War War of 1812: 1810–1815
- Constitutional convention: June 1816
- Polly v. Lasselle: 1820
- Capitol moved to Indianapolis: 1825
- Passage of the Mammoth Internal Improvement Act: 1831
- State Bankruptcy: 1841
- 2nd Constitution: 1851
- Civil War: 1860–1865
- Gas Boom: 1887–1905
- Harrison elected president: 1888
- KKK scandal: 1925

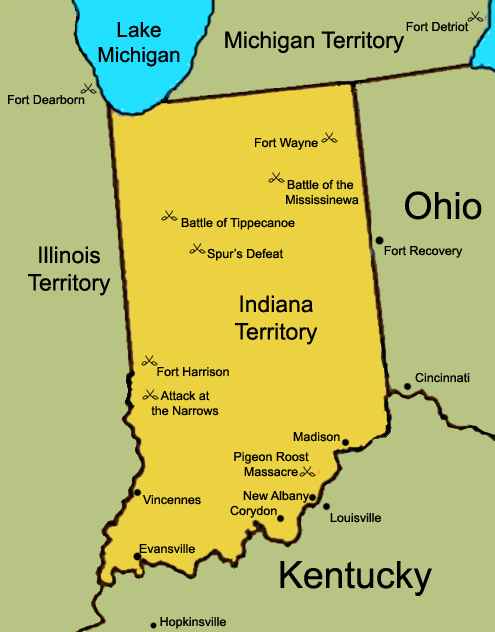
A map of the War of 1812 in the Indiana Territory

During the War of 1812, the Indiana Territory was the scene of numerous engagements which occurred as part of the conflict's western theater. Prior to the war's outbreak in 1812, settlers from the United States had been gradually colonizing the region, which led to increased tensions with local Native Americans and the outbreak of Tecumseh's War. In 1811, Tecumseh's confederacy, formed in response to encroachment by White American settlers, was defeated by U.S. forces at the Battle of Tippecanoe. After the conflict broke out, most Native Americans in the region joined forces with the British Empire and attacked American forces and settlers in concert with their British allies.

Numerous American citizens from Indiana enlisted in United States Army and militia units during the war, including the Indiana Rangers, and served in various theaters. In September 1812, months after the war's outbreak, British-allied Native Americans laid siege to two U.S. military forts in Indiana, Fort Harrison and Fort Wayne. Both sieges were unsuccessful as the besiegers were eventually forced to withdraw due to a lack of reinforcements. In November 1812, U.S. forces were defeated in Indiana by Native Americans at the Battle of Wild Cat Creek, but achieved a success next month at the Battle of the Mississinewa.

In 1813, violent skirmishes between U.S. troops and settlers and Native Americans increased, and in April the indecisive Battle of Tipton's Island occurred. William Henry Harrison, the unpopular governor of Indiana, led U.S. military efforts in the western theater. After the United States Navy defeated a smaller Royal Navy force at the Battle of Lake Erie in September 1813, British forces under the command of Henry Procter were forced to abandon Detroit and retreated into Upper Canada. American forces under Harrison's command pursued them and defeated a combined British-Indian force at the Battle of the Thames, killing Shawnee leader Tecumseh. The war resulted in the collapse of British proposals for an Indian barrier state and the solidification of U.S. control over Indiana.

== Background ==
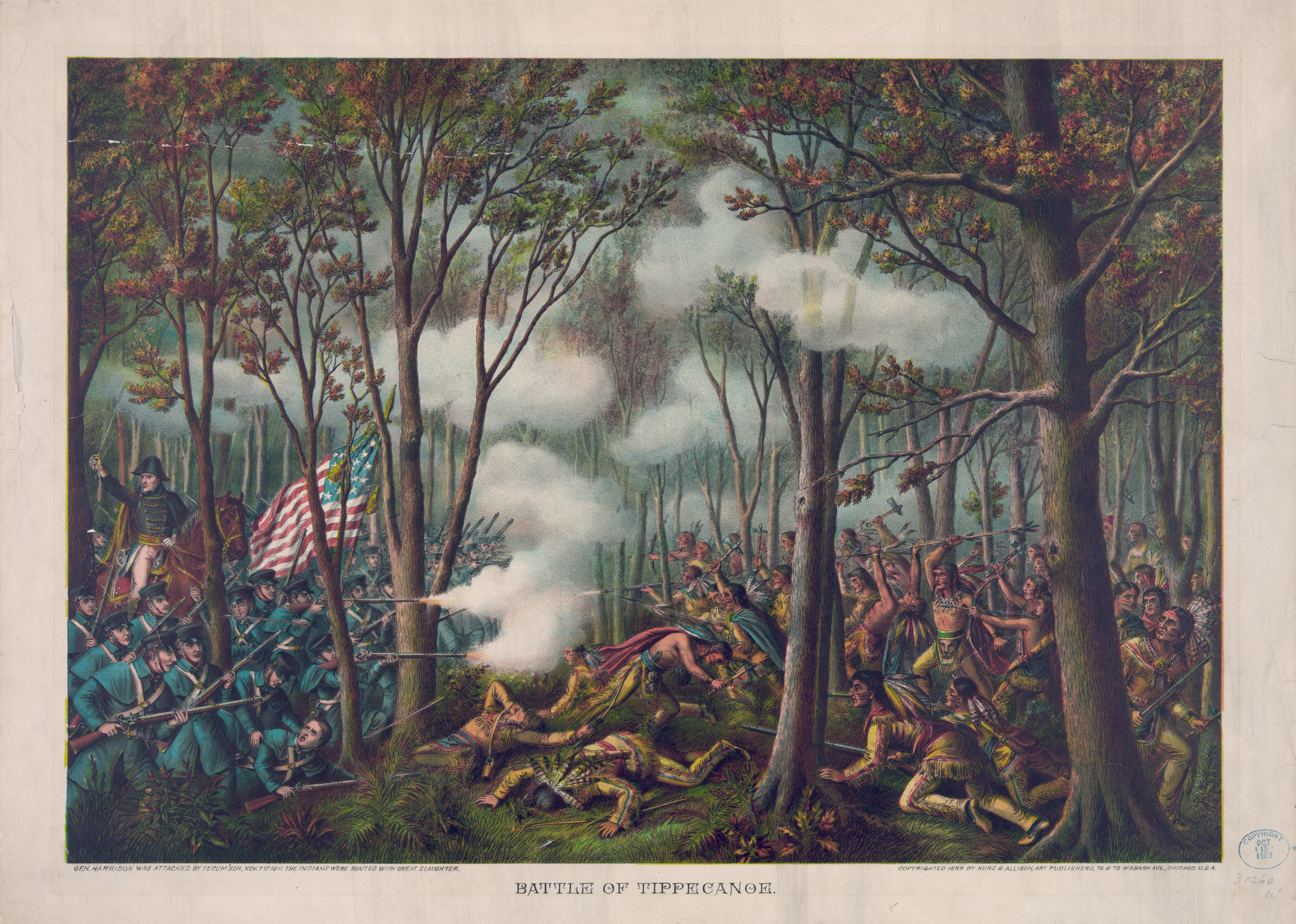
Battle of Tippecanoe

Beginning with the 1809 Treaty of Fort Wayne, tensions between the settlers in the Indiana Territory and the Indians began to increase dramatically. The events led to the Battle of Tippecanoe on November 6, 1811, during what is known as Tecumseh's War. In the battle William Henry Harrison led the territorial militia and army regulars against the forces of Tecumseh's Confederacy at Prophetstown. The confederacy's defeat was a major blow to their plans for a larger uprising, but left the tribes looking to outward sources of support. The British accepted an alliance with the tribes and the conflict merged with the War of 1812 in the following year.

Henry Clay and his supporters in Congress attacked and denounced the British who had supplied firearms to the western tribes and the Battle of Tippecanoe further raised tensions between the United States and Great Britain. Although Tecumseh publicly claimed to be at peace with the United States, he was privately encouraging his followers to prepare for war. He sent messengers to the British to attempt to stir them, reporting that the Americans were amassing troops for an invasion of Canada.

== War of 1812 ==
=== 1812 ===
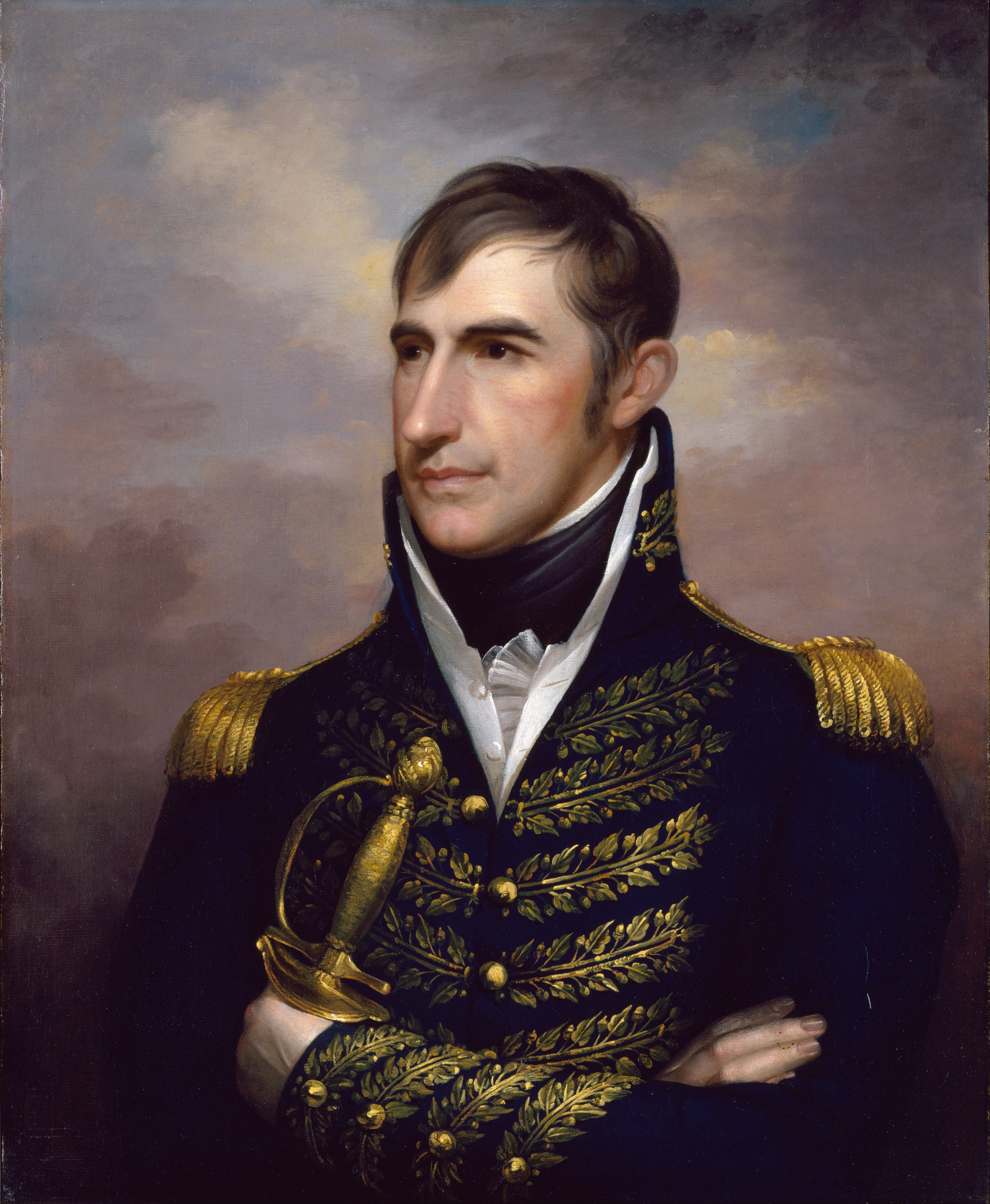
William Henry Harrison

Just before the start of the war in June, Territorial Governor William Henry Harrison had left the territory for army reinforcements, leaving Secretary John Gibson to govern in his absence. As it became apparent that hostilities would soon break out, Gibson ordered the militia to organize and sent emergency riders to inform Harrison of the situation and to return him to the territory as soon as possible. July and August gave Harrison several impediments to defending Indiana. First, Chief Little Turtle died on July 14, which meant that the United States lost one of the Indian leaders they could rely on to maintain peace. This was followed three days later by British forces gaining control of Lake Michigan by the capture of the American fort at Mackinac Island. The Potawatomi allies of the British captured Fort Dearborn at what is now Chicago on August 15, massacring the defenders of the fort, including William Wells, the adopted son of Little Turtle. The British and their allies captured Fort Detroit on August 16, putting British forces on the northern border of Indiana. On August 18 the Indians led by Tecumseh refused to listen to Harrison's request for a peace council.

With the impending onset of hostilities, Harrison sought military assistance from neighboring Kentucky. After being appointed brigadier general of the Kentucky militia on August 22, Harrison went to attain the force in order to defend the Indiana territorial government at Vincennes. Harrison had resigned his military commission in December 1811, but with the help of Kentucky governor Charles Scott, he was able to recruit Kentucky citizens to help defend Indiana; citizens in Ohio and Indiana had heard of the lack of camp provisions and chose not to be burdened by such hardships. It is believed Harrison sought military command due to losing popularity in the territory, particularly for supporting slavery in the territory. During September the Territorial Legislature met and Dennis Pennington introduced a bill to move the capitol from Vincennes because of its proximity to the Indians. The bill was passed and plans were put in place to begin selecting a new capitol and to evacuate the territorial records. The resolution stated: "Resolved: That the capitol be removed from Vincennes, because it is dangerous to continue longer here on account of threatened depredations of the Indians, who may destroy our valuable records."

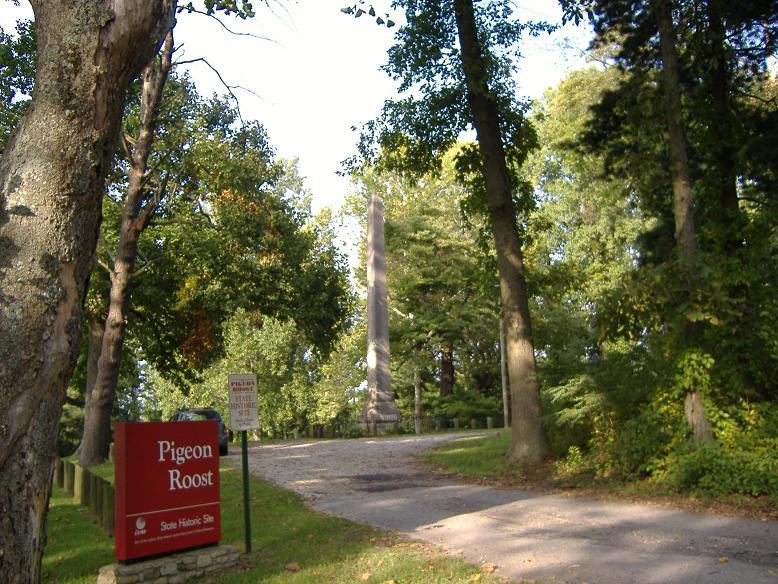
Pigeon Roost State Historic Site

September saw additional attacks across the territory. On September 3 in northern Clark County, Shawnees slaughtered the villagers of Pigeon Roost. Early September saw two separate attacks on Fort Harrison and Fort Wayne, but this time the defenders were able to repel the attack. The Siege of Fort Harrison, where the defenders were commanded by Zachary Taylor, resulted in the first land victory for American forces during the war; it was the heaviest assault the Indians threw at American defenders. Harrison himself relieved the Siege of Fort Wayne. On September 17, Harrison was given command of all American troops in the Northwest Territories as a brevet major general, replacing General James Winchester, and ordered to retake Detroit. Throughout the second half of the month Miamis continued sending emissaries to persuade the Delaware tribe to attack Americans.

The American forces struck back in November. Prophetstown was again destroyed on November 22 by General Samuel Hopkins, backed by attacking the deserted Tippecanoe River villages of the Kickapoo and Winnebago. The Battle of the Mississinewa saw forces under Colonel John B. Campbell further attack the Indians, but with his troops devastated by frostbite, Campbell took his men to Greenville. The Indians were not aided by the British in their assaults in Indiana, as the dry summer hindered efforts to send 600 British troops to Fort Wayne down the Maumee River. On December 28 Harrison resigned from his office as territorial governor; the position was not filled until Thomas Posey was given the office in April 1813.

=== 1813 ===
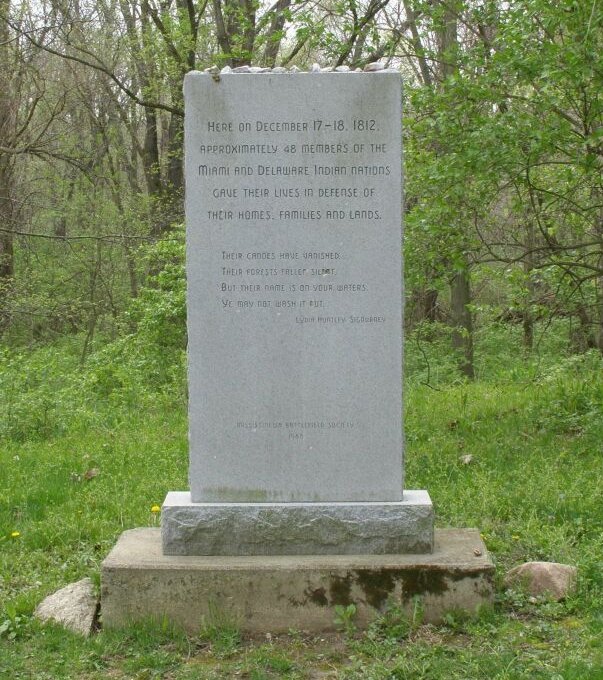
Mississinewa memorial

To combat the threat of Native American attacks, several companies of mounted Indiana Rangers were organized. Each company was 100 men strong. The un-uniformed troops carried their own provisions, and carried a knife and long knives to fight. These forces sought out Indian villages to avenge previous Indian attacks. There were several skirmishes between Native Americans and Rangers, such as the Battle of Tipton's Island, but they were smaller than the major clashes of 1812.

In July 1813, a large punitive expedition left Fort Vallonia and destroyed the well-developed Miami city at the confluence of the Wabash and Mississinewa Rivers. The town was deserted in advance of the army, however, and no Americans Indians were encountered during the entire expedition. That expedition was led by Colonel William Russell 7th regiment. He and 800 mounted rangers and riflemen traveled from Ft. Vallonia to as far north as Fort Wayne burning a British and Indian fort on the Wabash River. Then traveled south to Prophetstown and setting it afire once more. The expedition then made their way back to Vincennes. Officers with Colonel Russell include Colonel Joseph Bartholomew of Indiana.

On May 1, 1813, the territorial legislature relocated the capitol to Corydon, Indiana, a town near Kentucky that was central within the populated portion of the territory, yet farther from the Indians than the other candidate towns. On September 29, 1813, Harrison was able to drive British forces from Detroit, forcing the British to retreat into Canada. After defeating the British again at the Battle of the Thames, Harrison chose to retire to Ohio, never again to live in Indiana.

== Aftermath ==
From the American Revolutionary War to the end of the War of 1812, British agents operating from Canada had worked to instigate Native American tribes against the United States as part of an effort to create a pro-British Indian barrier state to block American expansion westward. In the Treaty of Ghent, Great Britain agreed not to arm nor trade with American Indians in the United States and dropped the proposal of a barrier state. The first decade of the 19th century was a time of relative peace between the white settlers in southern Indiana territory and the Native American nations in the rest of the territory. Although the United States hoped to acquire more of this land for settlement, it had an official policy of coexistence with the native tribes. Following the massacres and destruction of villages from 1811 to 1813, however, the United States adopted a removal policy. The punitive actions of the War of 1812 gave the United States firm control over Indiana Territory. This led to rapid settlement and development of the territory when peace was declared, and Indiana was admitted to the Union on December 11, 1816.

== Sources ==
- Allison, Harold (1986). The Tragic Saga of the Indiana Indians. Paducah: Turner Publishing Company. ISBN 0-938021-07-9.
- Dillon, John Brown (1859). A History of Indiana, from Its Earliest Exploration by Europeans to the Close of the Territorial Government, in 1816. Bingham & Doughty.
- Gresham, Matilda (1919). Life of Walter Quintin Gresham 1832–1895. Rand McNally & company.
- Langguth, A. J. (2006). Union 1812:The Americans Who Fought the Second War of Independence. New York: Simon & Schuster. ISBN 0-7432-2618-6.
- Mahon, John K. (1991). The War of 1812. Da Capo Press. ISBN 0-306-80429-8.
- Wilson, George R.; Thornbrough, Gayle (1946). The Buffalo Trace. Indiana Historical Society Publications, volume 15, number 2. Indianapolis: Indiana Historical Society.
