= Western theater of the War of 1812 =

Area of interest during the War of 1812

The Western theater of the War of 1812 was a theater of war during the War of 1812 between the United States and the United Kingdom. Far from the Atlantic Coast and large cities, logistics and communication were more challenging in the western territories and the United States frontier. For many Native American nations involved, this war was a continuation of the defense of their lands against encroaching settlers.

== Course of the War ==
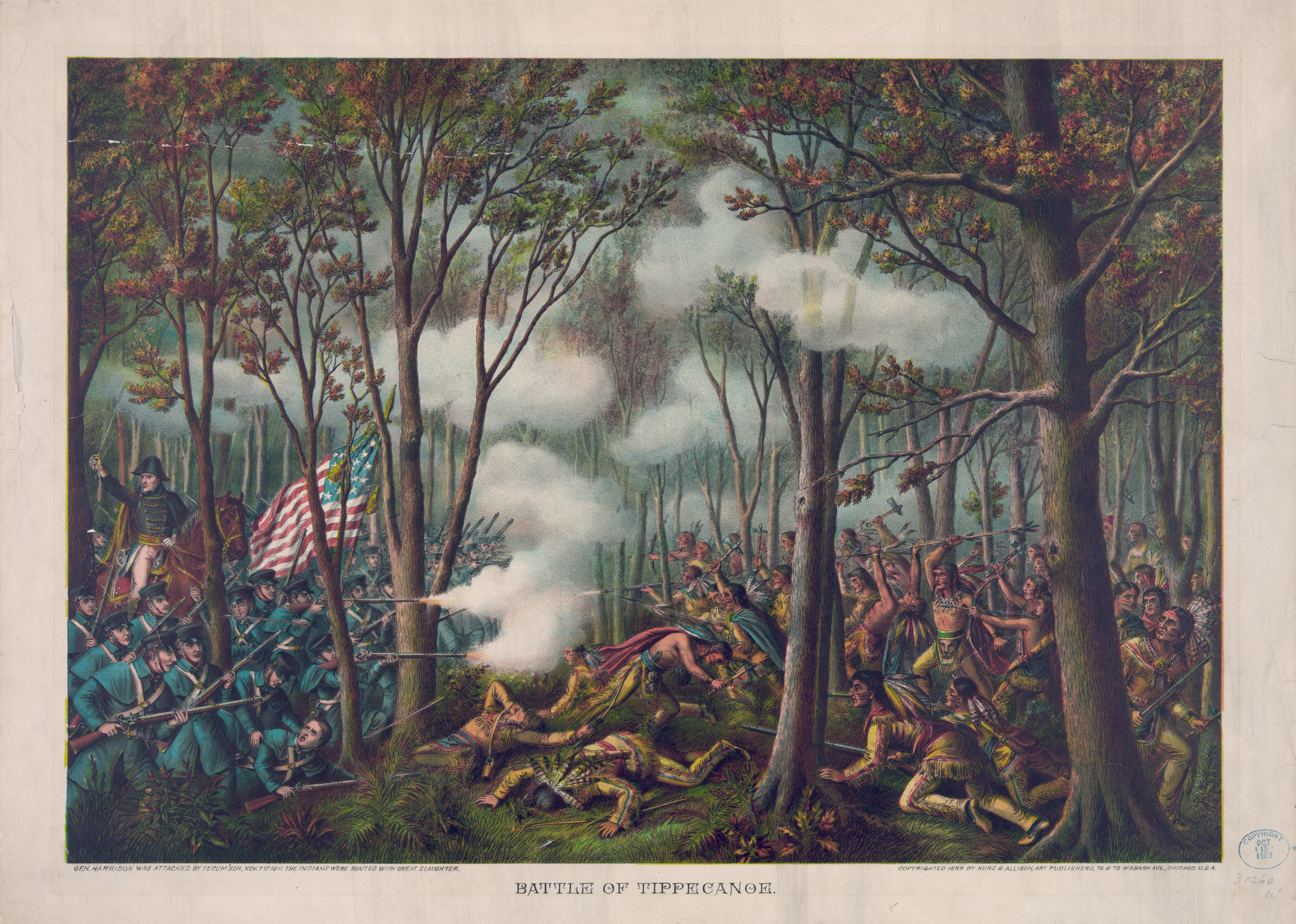
1811 Battle of Tippecanoe

Following the Northwest Indian War of the 1790s, the United States made it a policy to gradually remove Native Americans from the region and sell the land to white settlers. Ohio achieved statehood in 1803, and William Henry Harrison, governor of the Indiana Territory, pressed groups of Native Americans to sell more territory to the United States. In response, Shawnee leader Tecumseh built a pan-tribal movement to resist further encroachment. While Tecumseh was away in Autumn of 1811, Harrison attacked Propetstown and dispersed the people living there. Kentucky governor Charles Scott declared the battle as evidence of "British intrigue."

Following the battle, the United States began a military buildup in anticipation of a wider conflict. Congress authorized six new companies of rangers, five of which were expected to maintain the peace in the Northwest region. The United Kingdom, meanwhile, reduced their supply of lead and gunpowder to their Native American allies, which was intended to maintain the fur trade, but was also needed for combat. Tecumseh's War and the related Peoria War merged with the War of 1812 in the Western theater, much as the Creek War became intertwined with the Southern theater.

At the time war was declared, Fort Belle Fontaine was the headquarters of the Department of Louisiana, which included Fort Madison, Fort Massac, Fort Osage, and Fort Knox (Vincennes, Indiana). Although Fort Belle Fontaine was frequently threatened, it was never attacked. The United States abandoned the other forts during or soon after the War of 1812.

=== 1812–1813: Detroit ===
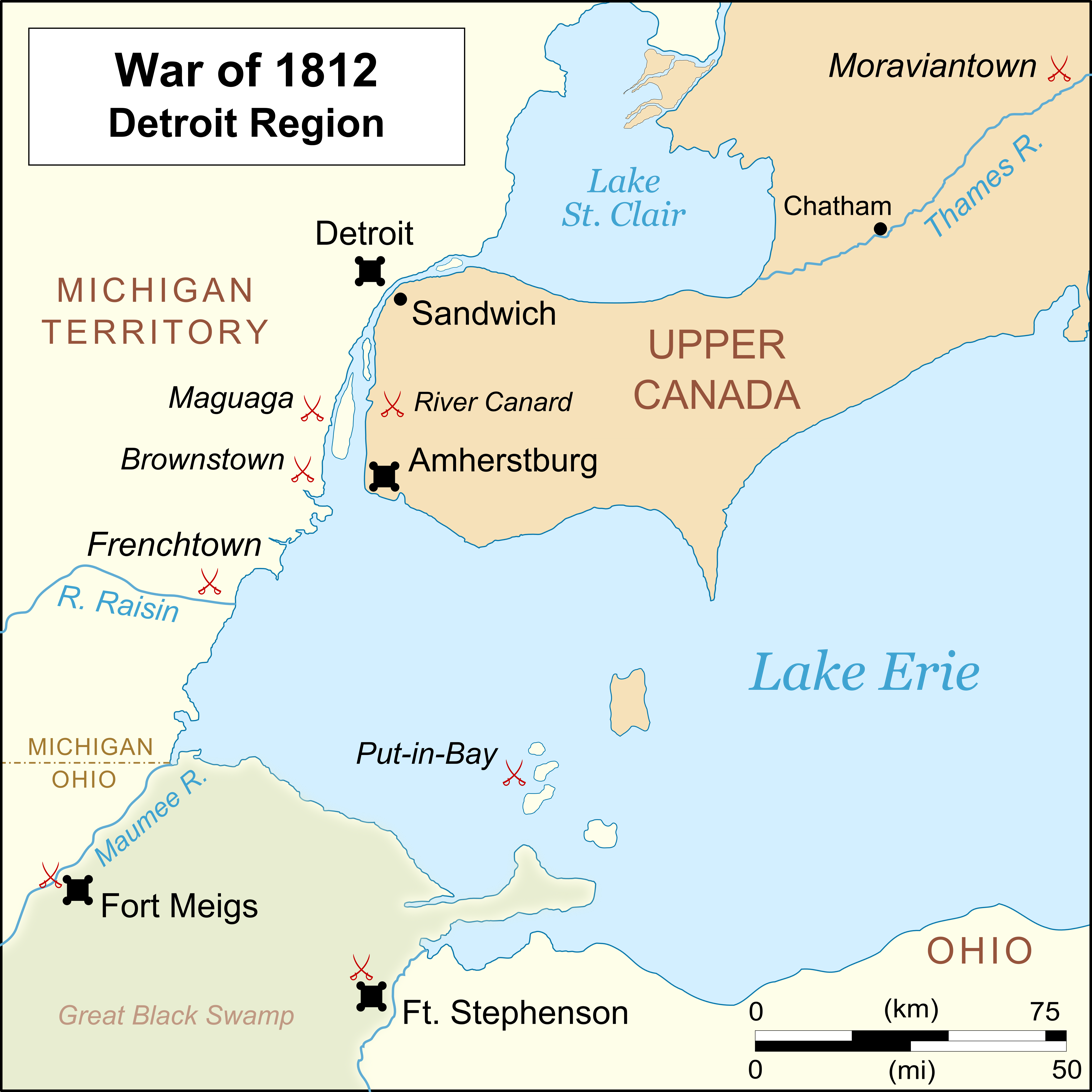
Detroit region 1812–1813

When the United States declared war in June 1812, the British forces in Canada received the news before their American counterparts in the Western United States. Major-General Sir Isaac Brock issued orders to initiate offensive operations against American forces. The resulting Siege of Fort Mackinac in July was the first major land engagement of the war. The next month, at the Battle of Brownstown, a combined force of British and First Nations warriors defeated a United States force when the militia fled. Brock and Tecumseh joined forces to capture Fort Detroit from the United States just weeks later. General James Winchester was ordered to retake Detroit, but when he failed to take decisive action, William Henry Harrison- now appointed as a Major General- was given command of the Army of the Northwest.

That same August, a Native American force composed primarily of Potawatomi captured Fort Dearborn from the United States. In September 1812, Native Americans coordinated simultaneous attacks on United States posts across the region, including Fort Harrison, Pigeon Roost, and Fort Madison, and Fort Wayne. Fort Madison, remote on the west bank of the Mississippi River, was abandoned by the U.S. Fort Harrison remained under siege for a week before it was relieved by a company of infantry and militia from Vincennes. General Harrison marched from Cincinnati to relieve Fort Wayne, then planned his attack on Fort Detroit.

Meanwhile, U.S. forces under Major General Samuel Hopkins- commander of frontier forces- launched a punitive campaign against Kickapoo villages. In November, Hopkins marched them to the site of the 1811 Battle of Tippecanoe, and found Prophetstown being rebuilt. They destroyed Prophetstown, but were lured into an ambush and endured heavy losses, forcing Hopkins to resign. Harrison also ordered punitive attacks against the Miami people, who he blamed for Fort Dearborn and Fort Wayne. A month later, in January 1813, Harrison's army was defeated at the Battle of Frenchtown, and prisoners were killed. The defeat ended Harrison's campaign against Detroit until the following Autumn, but "Remember the River Raisin!" became a rallying cry for the Americans.

With Detroit secure, the United Kingdom and their Native allies now launched an offensive of their own. In May 1813, Colonel Henry Procter and Tecumseh set siege to Fort Meigs in northwestern Ohio. Although the U.S. militia suffered heavy losses, the Native American and Canadian fighters returned to their homes, forcing Procter and Tecumseh to return to Canada. Along the way they attempted to capture Fort Stephenson, a small American post on the Sandusky River near Lake Erie. They were repulsed with serious losses, marking the end of the British Ohio campaign.

That September, the United States Navy defeated the British in the Battle of Lake Erie, allowing the U.S. freedom of movement on the lake. General Harrison returned to capture the now isolated Detroit, which was abandoned by Major General Procter. Proctor also burned Fort Malden, which was rebuilt and occupied by the United States. Harrison pursued Procter until 5 October, where they met at the Battle of the Thames, near Moraviantown. Tecumseh was killed in this battle, and his confederacy fell into disarray. After these losses, the United Kingdom found it more difficult to move people, equipment, and trade goods to western outposts. This, in turn, made it more difficult to maintain alliances with Native American nations in the region. Therefore, the British re-routed their supply lines overland to Georgian Bay, and from there to Fort Mackinac.

=== 1814–1815: Mackinac and Prairie du Chien ===
Key locations in 1814–1815

Although smaller skirmishes between the United States and Native American continued after the United States secured Lake Erie and Detroit, the western war after 1813 largely centered around Fort Mackinac and Fort Shelby, which guarded the Wisconsin and Mississippi Rivers near modern day Prairie du Chien, Wisconsin. William Clark led a force of Army regulars and militia from Fort Belle Fontaine up the Mississippi River. They fought a small Sac force near Rock Island, then continued to Prairie du Chien. A small Canadian garrison withdrew, and Clark had the fort rebuilt, leaving 65 soldiers of the 24th Infantry Regiment under Lieutenant Joseph Perkins and an 80-man river gunboat named the Governor Clark.

British Lieutenant Colonel Robert McDouall arrived at Fort Mackinac and sent an expedition under William McKay to capture Prairie du Chien in July 1814. The force consisted of militia, Native Americans, and residents from Green Bay and Prairie du Chien who supported United Kingdom. They had one 3-pound cannon, which was ineffective against the fort, but was able to damage the Governor Clark riverboat, which floated downstream. Lieutenant Perkins surrendered on 20 July on the condition that they be permitted to return to Fort Belle Fontaine, and the fort was renamed Fort McKay.

The United States dispatched an expedition under Major John Campbell to recapture the fort, but 400 Sac, Fox, and Kickapoo warriors under Black Hawk ambushed them on 22 July at the Battle of Rock Island Rapids. Campbell was able to retreat when the Governor Clark floated downstream into the battle.

That same July, the United States sent naval vessels to recapture Fort Mackinac. McDouall and Native American defenders ambushed them and forced them to retreat. The United States ships destroyed a British fort at Nottawasaga Bay and left two armed schooners to blockade Mackinac. The blockade worked for a time, but made the British garrison desperate. In September, the British captured the USS Tigress and then used it to capture the USS Scorpion. The U.S. continued to raid Ontario from Fort Detroit and Fort Malden, however, and were frequently assisted by Canadians who sided with the United States. One of the largest raids was led by Brigadier General Duncan McArthur, who captured or destroyed so many horses and food stuffs that it set back British operations that Winter.

In September 1814, the Sauk, Fox, and Kickapoo, supported by part of Prairie du Chien's British garrison, repulsed a second American force led by Major Zachary Taylor in the Battle of Credit Island. These victories enabled the Sauk, Fox, and Kickapoo to harass American garrisons further south, which led the Americans to abandon Fort Johnson, in central Illinois Territory.

== Aftermath ==
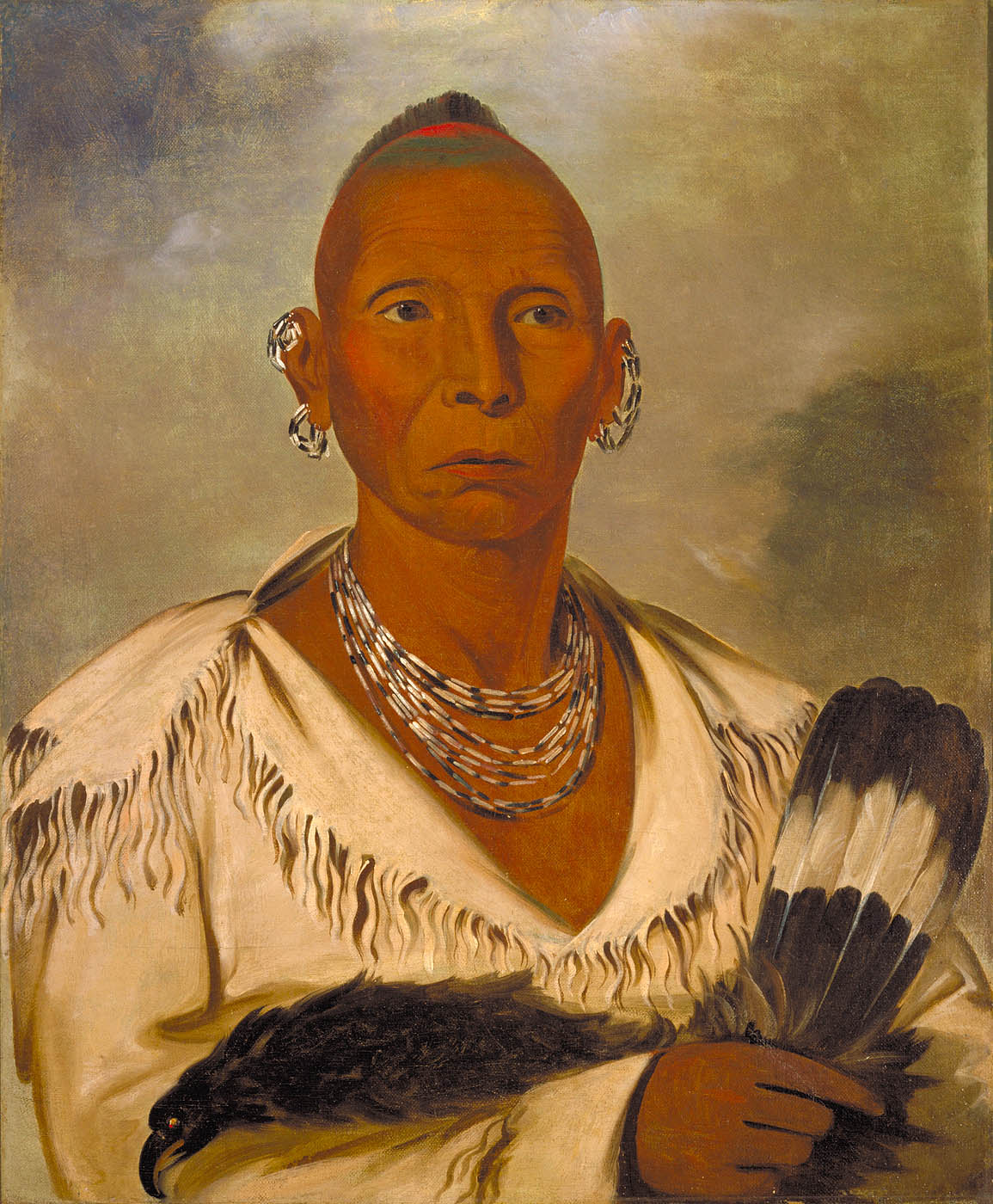
1832 portrait of Black Hawk by George Catlin.

William Henry Harrison resigned his command in May 1814, and turned his attention back towards Indian removals. He declared that the Native Americans "deserved no mercy," but requested supplies to relieve their "immediate and pressing wants." He called for a grand council in Greenville, Ohio that July, where he forced Native American leaders to sign an agreement aligning them with the United States against the British. Harrison wrote that when the war was over, the United States would be able to acquire their lands cheaply.

The War of 1812 officially ended in February 1815, but it took months for word to reach the western outposts and villages. The British returned Mackinac and other captured territory to the United States after the war. Native Americans were excluded from treaty negotiations. The United States and United Kingdom largely returned to their pre-war status, and the United States was now able to focus their military strength on the Native Nations. The Sauk continued to fight in the West. They raided outposts at Cote Sans Dessein in April 1815 and the Battle of the Sink Hole in May. Black Hawk signed a peace treaty with the United States in 1816, but a decade later when the United States used that treaty to claim Sauk lands east of the Mississippi River, the Black Hawk War began.
