= Pigeon Roost massacre =

1812 attack on a frontier settlement in Indiana Territory

- Part of the War of 1812 and the American Indian Wars
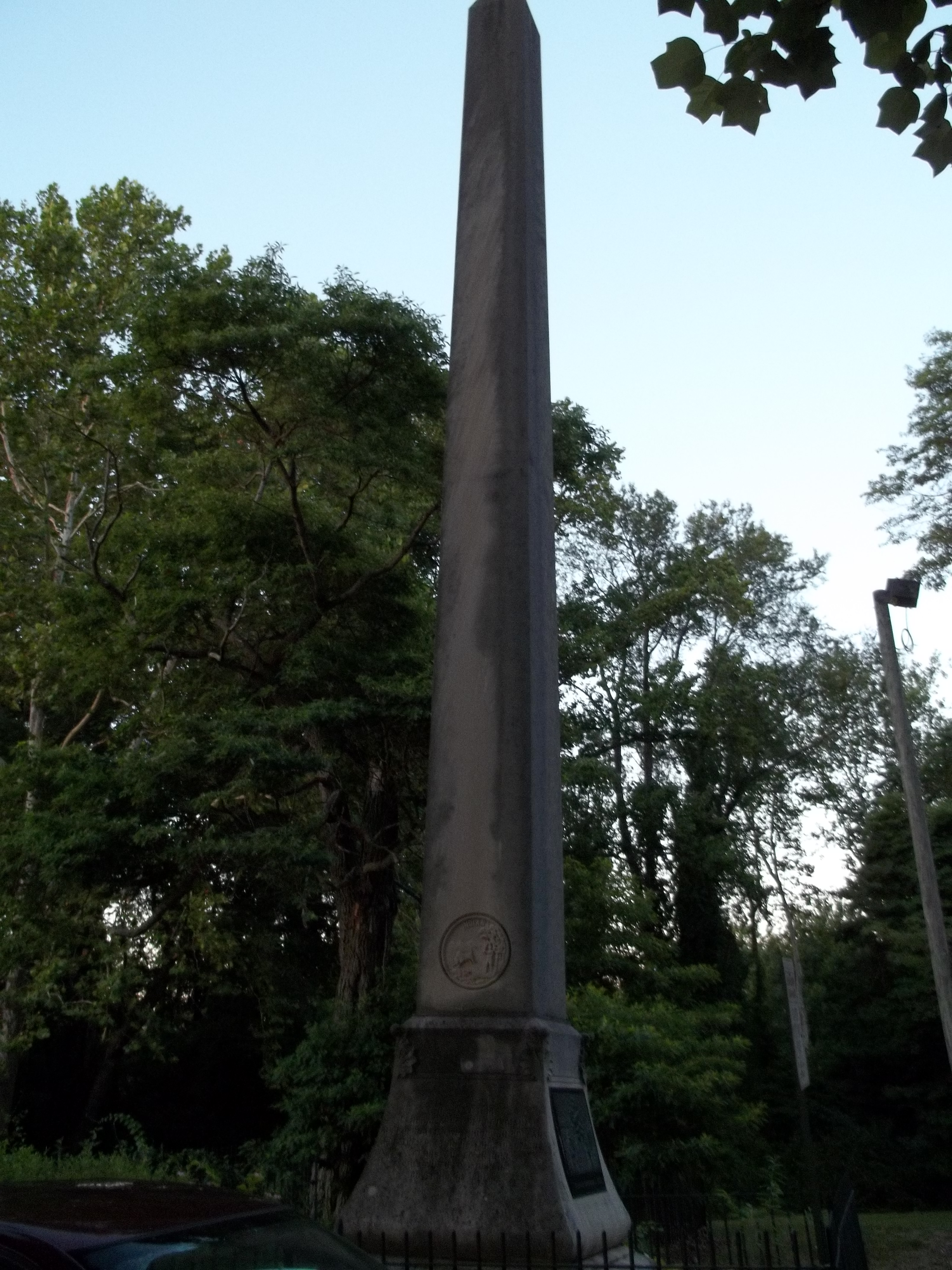
- The 1904 memorial obelisk at the massacre site

- Pigeon Roost (Indiana) Location within Indiana
- Location: 38.617181°N 85.773709°W; Pigeon Roost, near present-day Underwood, Clark County (now Scott County), Indiana Territory
- Date: September 3, 1812
- Target: Settlers of the Pigeon Roost settlement
- Attack type: Mass murder
- Deaths: 24 settlers; 4 attackers
- Perpetrator: Native American war party (mostly Shawnee)

The Pigeon Roost massacre was a Native American attack on the frontier settlement of Pigeon Roost in Indiana Territory on September 3, 1812, shortly after the outbreak of the War of 1812. A war party—mostly Shawnee, possibly including some Delaware and Potawatomi—killed twenty-four settlers, including fifteen children, and carried off two children; four of the attackers were killed. It was the first Native American attack on settlers in Indiana during the war. The settlement lay in what was then Clark County (now Scott County), about a mile north of present-day Underwood.

== Background ==
Pigeon Roost was established in 1809 by William E. Collings (1758–1828) and was settled mainly by families from Kentucky. Named for the passenger pigeons common in the area, it consisted of a single line of cabins running about a mile north of present-day Underwood. The nearest Native village lay some 20 miles north, near the Muscatatuck River, and its people are not believed to have taken part in the attack. The closest blockhouses were at Vienna to the north and one built by Zebulon Collings to the south, near present-day Henryville.

== Attack ==
On the afternoon of September 3, 1812, a small war party led by a man recorded as Missilemotaw (or Missilimetaw) attacked the settlement, in an action that appeared coordinated with that month's assaults on Fort Harrison and Fort Wayne. The raiders first killed two hunters near the settlement, then struck the cabins. The family of Elias Payne—his wife and seven children—were killed; Payne and his brother-in-law Isaac Coffman were killed in the nearby woods. The Collings family suffered heavily: Henry Collings and his pregnant wife were killed, and the wife and seven children of his brother Richard, then serving under General William Henry Harrison, were among the dead. A sister of William Collings, married to John Biggs, hid in a thicket with her children and smothered her infant's cries to avoid discovery; the child died of suffocation. In all, twenty-four settlers, including fifteen children, were killed and two children taken; four of the attackers died.

== Pursuit ==
Surviving settlers fled to Zebulon Collings's blockhouse, and the war party withdrew before the militia could respond. More than a hundred militiamen under Major John McCoy mustered the next day and followed the raiders to the Muscatatuck River, where the trail was lost. A party of Indiana Rangers from Washington County under Captain Henry Dawalt later intercepted them at Sand Creek, in present-day Bartholomew County; one ranger, John Zink, was killed, but the raiders escaped. The reputed leader, Missilemotaw, was captured on September 20, 1813, and under threat of death confessed to leading the raid.

== Interpretations ==
Historians have offered differing explanations for the attack, and its early accounts have been described as culturally biased by modern standards. The raid is commonly placed within the wider War of 1812 conflict between the United States and British-allied Native Americans. Some accounts treat Pigeon Roost as a vulnerable target struck while many of its men were away serving under William Henry Harrison; others hold that the settlement was deliberately singled out. A local-grievance interpretation appears in Lewis C. Baird's 1909 history of Clark County, which states that "bad blood" had arisen after the Collings boys took a fawn from the Natives and refused to return it.

== Aftermath and memorials ==
The Pigeon Roost settlement was rebuilt but eventually abandoned. Most of the victims were buried in a common grave. In 1904 the State of Indiana appropriated $2,000 for a 44-foot (13 m) obelisk memorial, dedicated October 1, 1904. The site became an Indiana state historic site in 1929, and the Indiana Historical Bureau placed a state historical marker there in 2004; the grounds are maintained as the Pigeon Roost State Historic Site.

== See also ==
- Indiana in the War of 1812
