= United States Rangers in the War of 1812 =

United States Rangers
- Active: 1 January 1812 – 15 June 1815
- Country: United States
- Allegiance: United States Army
- Branch: Cavalry
- Type: Light cavalry
- Role: Reconnaissance
- Size: 17 companies authorized
- Engagements: Tecumseh's War; War of 1812

Commanders
- Notable commanders: Captain Nathan Boone

United States Rangers were originally raised for Tecumseh's War, but they continued to serve against hostile Indians after the United States declaration of war against Great Britain. A total of 17 independent companies were authorized from Kentucky, Ohio, Indiana, Illinois and Missouri. The Rangers were neither militia, nor regulars, but formed part of the war establishment of the United States as volunteers.

== Formation ==
In readiness for possible Indian depredations after the Battle of Tippecanoe, the United States Congress established the United States Rangers, January 2, 1812. The act was renewed in 1813, and the number of ranger companies increased several times during the War of 1812. The President of the United States selected which state or territory should have the benefit of raising ranger companies. The Rangers were not militia, but formed part of the war establishment of the United States Army.

== Organization ==
The 1812 Act authorized the President to raise up to six companies of rangers, either volunteers or men enlisted for a one-year period. Two companies from Ohio, the rest from Kentucky, Indiana and Illinois. In June, the secretary of war, William Eustis, reported that he had deployed the six companies at the frontiers of Ohio, Indiana, Illinois and Louisiana. In July an additional company was authorized, and in February 1813 ten additional companies. Four of the new companies to be raised in Indiana, three in Illinois, and three in Missouri. Each company would consist of 1 captain, 1 first lieutenant, 1 second lieutenant, 1 ensign, 4 sergeants, 4 corporals, and 60 privates; the officers to be paid the same as the same grade in the army, the men $1 a day if furnishing a horse, otherwise $0.75. No field officers (majors, lieutenant colonels, and colonels) or general officers were authorized or appointed.

Rangers from Indiana, Illinois and Missouri
Date	Officers	Non-commissioned officers	Soldiers
Feb. 1, 1813	4	8	61
Jan. 13, 1814	4	11	91
July 23, 1813	4	11	104
May 15, 1815	13	28	271
Oct. 20, 1815	5	11	81

In 1813, the Congress decided that each of the ten companies organized under the 1813 Act would consist of 1 captain, 1 first lieutenant, 1 second lieutenant, 1 third lieutenant, 1 ensign, 5 sergeants, 8 corporals, and 90 privates.

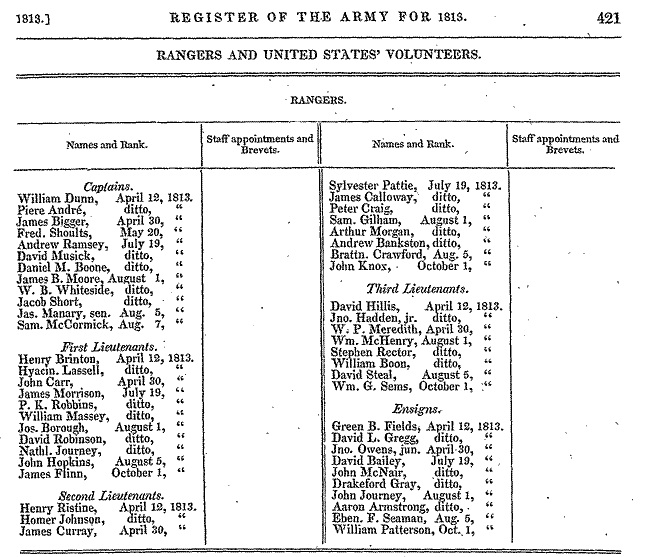
Ranger Officers 1813.

Rangers Officers 1813
Captains	First Lieutenants	Second Lieutenants	Third Lieutenants	Ensigns
12	11	11	8	10

== Operations ==
The rangers were established with the expressed mission of protecting the frontier from the Indians. They should be organized, armed and equipped in such a manner as the nature of the service required. The rangers scouted the frontier, and should disperse any hostile Indian war parties encountered. Rangers operated in Ohio, Illinois Territory, Indiana Territory, and Missouri Territory. The Ohio, Illinois and Indiana Rangers came under the operational control of Colonel William Russell of the 7th U.S. Infantry, while governor Benjamin Howard controlled the operations of the Missouri Rangers.

=== Ninian Edwards’ Raid ===
Ninian Edwards gathered 350 mounted rangers and volunteers near Edwardsville and personally led an expedition north to Peoria. His senior staff included many of the territory's most prominent citizens. These included Nathaniel W. Pope, territorial secretary, Benjamin Stephenson, Thomas Carlin, future Illinois Governor, and William, Elias, and Nelson Rector. The company was divided into two smaller regiments, one commanded by Stephenson acting as Colonel, the other by a Rector brother. Edwards and his army of Rangers and Volunteers departed Fort Russell from Edwardsville on October 18, 1812. After crossing into Logan County, Edwards’ army encountered two deserted Kickapoo villages near present-day Salt Creek, formerly known as the Saline Fork of the Sangamon River. The regiment discovered native artwork, some of which depicted the scalping of American settlers. The regiment burned both abandoned villages. After burning the two Kickapoo villages on the Sangamon River along the way, the Americans advanced on Peoria itself. The village the army was preparing to attack was recently developed at the head of Peoria Lake and inhabited by Piankashaw and Kickapoo Natives likely led by Chief Pemwatome. At dawn, the army of rangers and volunteers advanced. Edwards inflicted a devastating defeat to the Native American village. Edwards’ army seized eighty horses, some recently stolen from Saint Clair County, silver ornaments, 200 brass kettles, guns, and six scalps believed to belong to the women and children of the settler O’Neal family from Missouri. Edwards estimated that approximately thirty Native peoples were killed in the raid, although later estimates from the Kickapoo suggested the number was closer to eighty. The Americans had completed their raid before returning to Edwardsville on October 31, 1812.

=== Samuel Hopkin’s Raid ===
American Brigadier General Samuel Hopkins conducted a raid against the Native American enemies by targeting their village bases. Hopkins had 1,200 troops including regulars, militias, a company of Rangers, and some scouts. On November 11, 1812, Hopkins and his raiding force departed fort Harrison. The American raiding force destroyed 40 huts of Prophetstown and destroyed 160 huts of a Kickapoo village. The American raiders cut down all the growing corn they came across. Detachments of the American force split up for pursuit of the fleeing Indians. One detachment of Rangers fell into an Indian ambush and 18 Rangers were killed. Hopkins and the rest of his raiding force all withdrew safely back to fort Harrison after completing their raid. Hopkins believed he had crippled the indian enemy’s ability to survive in the winter by destroying their village bases and corn supplies from their successful raid.

=== Engagement at Africa Point ===
On April 18, 1813, during the fortification phase of Fort LaMotte, two barrel coopers Isaac Brimberry and Thomas Kennedy went up 'Africa Point', a knoll surrounded by swamp on the Wabash River, to procure some wood. American Rangers came across Indian canoes pulled on the shore of the river. Both Rangers Brimberry and Kennedy reported their sightings to the Fort LaMotte commander, Captain Pierce Andrews. Andrews sent up a squad of Rangers as skirmishers with the timber party to look after the Indians. The rangers divided themselves into two groups, a six-man party going in advance while the other stayed back and acted as a reserve. On Africa Point the advance group was ambushed and fired upon by the Kickapoo Indians. During the ensuing battle, the American Ranger party retreated suffering 4 dead and the 2 badly wounded who escaped back to the fort. Upon hearing rifle fire, the rear guard fell back to the fort as well. The Indians had 5 killed.

=== Ranger patrol fighting off Indian attack ===
On July 4, 1813. Eleven American Rangers who were patrolling were attacked by an equivalent force of Winnebagos. The Rangers fought them off and rode off when the skirmish ended. But the Winnebagos followed them and attacked them again. The Rangers withdrew back to Fort Mason with a total number of casualties numbering 1 killed and 3 fatally wounded. Later, the Rangers. Entered out of Fort Mason finding 2 dead bodies of the enemy Winnebagos that attacked them. Otherwise, further casualties of the enemy Winnebagos could not be determined.

=== Ranger patrol engages Indians on boats ===
After the July 4, 1813, engagement of a ranger patrol with attacking Winnebagos. 150 Missouri Rangers came to the scene finding 2 dead enemy Indian warriors on July 9, 1813. Then the Missouri Rangers saw two or three canoes carrying at least 30 Indians. The Rangers believed these were the same enemy combatants that attacked the ranger patrol on July 4, 1813, and were headed to attack more settlements. The Rangers opened fire on the Indians driving the canoes to an island on Illinois shore, possibly what is now called Saverton Island. Both sides kept up a heavy fire until an Indian raised a blue cloth. The Rangers ceased fire. But the Indians opened fire again. The Rangers returned fire until the surviving Indians disappeared. It was thought only two or three Indians escaped.

=== Ambushing Shawnee Native Americans at Tipton’s Island ===
In April 1813, during the War of 1812, a Shawnee war party killed two white settlers eight miles from Fort Vallonia. The war party continued towards the fort, killing another settler and wounding three more. The Shawnee then put some distance between themselves and the fort, but were soon pursued by 30 Indiana Rangers under Major John Tipton known as "Corydon's Yellow Jackets". The Shawnee crossed the flooded Driftwood River and, thinking they had lost their pursuers, set up camp on an island in the east fork of the White River, just northeast of modern day Seymour. One of Tipton's scouts located the trail, however, and the rangers cautiously approached the river. Major Tipton ordered the rangers to maintain absolute silence, and tied one ranger to a tree when he kept talking. The Rangers took ambush positions along the bank of the river and opened fire. The Shawnee were taken by surprise, but returned fire for about half an hour. Few casualties were suffered due to the firing distance across the river and the shelter provided by the wooded island. One Shawnee was killed and several were wounded, but three Shawnees drowned when they tried to swim across the flooded White River. The Rangers could not pursue the Shawnee across the river, so they returned to Fort Vallonia. There was a victory celebration, but as details of the skirmish emerged, it was determined to be a small engagement against a war party that managed to escape. "Tipton's Island" became a term of ridicule.

=== Joseph Bartholomew’s Raid ===
On June 11, 1813. Bartholomew once conducted a raid against British-allied Delaware Native American towns. He set out with 137 mounted Indiana Rangers. Bartholomew and his rangers raided the Native American Delaware villages destroying 1000 bushels of corn, capturing 3 horses, surprising and killing one Native American warrior. However, a ranger was critically wounded by another Native American warrior who fired on the rangers from concealment and ran off. After Bartholomew and his rangers destroyed the food supplies. They withdrew back to Fort Vallonia. The wounded Indiana ranger who was also brought back to the fort later died from his wounds.

=== Colonel William Russell’s Raid ===
Colonel William Russell used the Rangers to supplement his infantry in the 1812 Peoria War. Colonel Russell once led a raid on July 1, 1813, with a large force of mounted raiders including Indiana Rangers and other riflemen which traveled 500 miles through the Indiana territory destroying hostile Indian villages. Joseph Bartholomew who was a commander of the Indiana Rangers accompanied Russell on this raid. The Americans had located an Indian stockade fort in Miami County Indiana and he burned it to the ground. Russell and his mounted raiders destroyed at least 5 enemy village bases. This raid lasted for about one month. After completing the raid, Russell and his fellow mounted raiders withdrew safely back to Fort Harrison. Not one American was lost in the raiding campaign.

=== Captain DuBois and his mission to recover horses ===
After Colonel William Russell got back from his raid. William Russell heard of Native American activity. So he sent Captain DuBois and a force of rangers. The Native American enemy stole a number of horses and took off. Captain DuBois and a party of rangers pursued them and overtook them, recovering 3 horses but did not spot a single Native American. Captain DuBois, Captain John Andre, and 16–18 rangers pursued further. The rangers discovered a horse trail and captured an Indian spy. The rangers kept him in the rear while moving on. Then the rangers put him in the front and dispatched him. Which gave notice to the Indians and caused them to abandon their horses. The Rangers recovered 5 horses. After recovering 8 horses, all the rangers returned back to American lines on August 2, 1813.

=== Nathan Boone’s Patrol ===
On August 7, 1813. Nathan Boone and sixteen Rangers went on a patrol across Mississippi to gather intelligence to the north between the river and Illinois. Nathan Boone and his Rangers patrolled for 2 days but found nothing. At night, the Rangers camped. A fellow Ranger who acted as a sentry reported that he believed enemy Indian combatants were lurking in the darkness surrounding their camp. Nathan doubled his sentries, ordered his men to sleep away from the fire, and placed them behind trees around the camp. Near midnight, the Indians numbering at least 60 warriors launched a full scale surprise attack and opened heavy fire into the camp from one side. Both the Ranger sentries were shot and wounded. The Rangers fell back firing into the darkness where they saw muzzle flashes and heard loud voices. The Rangers took cover behind the trees on the other side of camp. Nathan crouched behind a tree and realized his rangers were outnumbered. The Rangers behind their trees frantically reloaded and fired trying to see their enemy in the darkness. Nathan shouted his men to full back from tree to tree. Nathan and his rangers ran off into the brush to safety. Nathan and his rangers rallied into a circle behind some trees. The rangers held their position behind their trees while the Indians were busy looting the camp. In the morning, the Indians had left with loot and as many ranger horses they could take. Nathan and his rangers found only half their mounts. Nathan and his rangers withdrew back to base to inform their commander of confirmed intelligence that the Native American threat persisted still. The American Rangers only suffered 2 slightly wounded.

=== Engagement at Longwoods ===
There were two American raiding groups that took part during this engagement of Longwoods in Canada on March 4, 1814. The first raiding group consisted of Michigan rangers led by Captain William Gill and Michigan Militia Dragoons led by Captain Lee. The Michigan militia/rangers on horses foraged and gathered intelligence. They looted farms they passed for livestock, grain, and anything else that came of use. The raiders received intelligence that a Canadian Militia force was heading to find them. The Michigan mounted raiders quickly withdrew and rendezvoused with the second American raiding group consisting of American Army commander Andrew Holmes with his horse mounted regulars. Together, the Americans withdrew further, and set up an entrenched breastwork position. The Canadian militia, together with a number of British-allied Native Americans, went to attack the American entrenched position. The American Rangers, Militia, and Regulars were covered and hidden behind their breastwork while opening heavy accurate fire on the enemy force who had very little cover. After inflicting substantial casualties on the enemy, the American mounted raiders withdrew quietly at night back to American lines. The Canadians and Native Americans lost 14 killed, 51 wounded, 1 captured, and 1 missing. The American raiding force including their Rangers lost 4 killed and 3 wounded.

=== Andrew Westbrook’s raid in Canada ===
On January 31, 1814. Pro-American Canadian Andrew Westbrook and his force with American Michigan rangers made a bold move against the Delaware settlement of Canada, crossing the frozen Thames to swoop down and capture a British Canadian leader Capt. Daniel Springer, (1st Oxford) but also four other Canadian militia officers- Col Francois Baby(1st Kent), Capt. Belah Brigham (1st oxford), and Lt. John Dolson (1st Kent). With these men safely arrested, Westbrook burned his own house/possessions, and gathered as many provisions as possible. Then led his wife and family to Detroit. Unfortunately, his wife died in an accident on the way across the St. Clair River. Andrew Westbrook’s fellow American Michigan rangers raided additional nearby barns and houses for loot and provisions for their return trip.

=== Engagement at Indian Creek ===
On July 10, 1814. A group of 10 Indian warriors in Illinois conducted a raid killing one woman and her six children. The 10 warriors took off after completing their raid. Samuel Whiteside and his fellow 70 Rangers went in pursuit to exact retribution for the murder of the woman and her six children. At a place later called Indian Creek, the Rangers attacked the Indians and killed 9 Indian warriors. But one Indian warrior got away and escaped.

== Disbandment ==
The United States Rangers were retained in service until June 15, 1815, when they were disbanded.
