= Battle of Wild Cat Creek =

1812 battle between Native Americans and the United States

- Part of the War of 1812
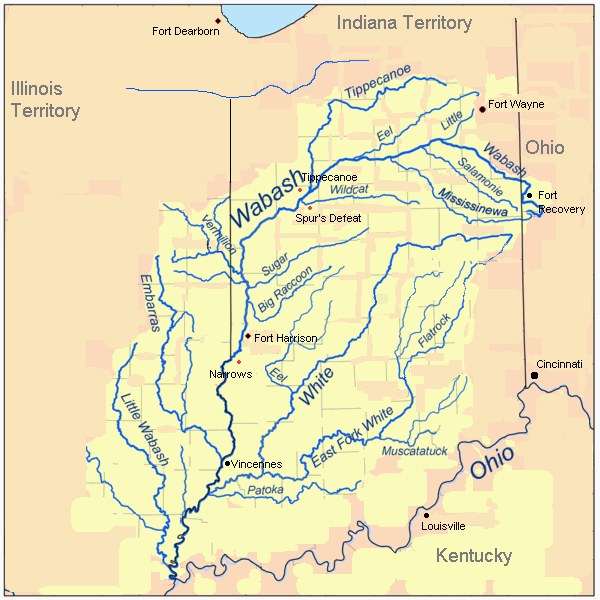
Date	November 21-22, 1812
Location	Wildcat Creek (Indiana)
Result	Native American victory

Belligerents
Indigenous Confederacy: Kickapoo; Winnebago; Shawnee	United States; 7th Infantry; Kentucky Infantry; Indiana Rangers

Commanders and leaders
	Samuel Hopkins Kumakskau Shawnee brother of Tecumseh in command

Strength
1,200	1,250

Casualties and losses
None	17 killed 3 wounded

The Battle of Wild Cat Creek was the result of a November 1812 punitive expedition against Native American villages during the War of 1812. It has been nicknamed "Spur's Defeat", which is thought to refer to the spurs used by the soldiers to drive their horses away from the battle as quickly as possible. The campaign is sometimes referred to as the Second Battle of Tippecanoe.

== Second Tippecanoe campaign ==
Following several defeats and massacres in 1812, notably the Fort Dearborn Massacre and the Pigeon Roost Massacre, a joint punitive campaign was sent to Illinois Territory under the commands of Major General Samuel Hopkins and Colonel William Russell. Russell, coming from the Siege of Fort Harrison, led a force of Illinois militia and Indiana Rangers, and was successful in destroying a hostile Kickapoo village on Peoria Lake. Russell had to retreat to Cahokia, however, when he could not locate the forces under Hopkins. Hopkins could not get his Kentucky militia to engage, and had been driven back to Vincennes when the Kickapoo started a prairie grass fire.

Hopkins was humiliated by his loss, and discharged the Kentucky militia under his command. He then raised a new army, consisting of three regiments of Kentucky Infantry, one company of the 7th Infantry under Major Zachary Taylor, a troop of Indiana Rangers, and a company of scouts. Hopkins left Vincennes on 11 November 1812 and marched north, following the same route William Henry Harrison had taken in 1811.

When the army reached the site of the Battle of Tippecanoe, they found that some of the United States' dead had been exhumed and scalped. The bodies were reburied before the army proceeded to Prophetstown, which it reached on 19 November. Prophetstown had been destroyed in the 1811 Battle of Tippecanoe, but was now partially rebuilt, with an even larger Kickapoo village nearby. All residents and provisions had been evacuated as the army approached. The army burned the villages to the ground.

A Winnebago village was found nearby, on Wildcat Creek, and Hopkins decided to attack it. Colonel Miller led 300 men and destroyed the evacuated village. On November 21, as a scouting party explored the creek, they were fired upon, and the entire force retreated to rejoin the main army, leaving behind the body of a soldier named Dunn.

The next day, 22 November, Colonels Miller and Wilcox accompanied Captain Beckes and sixty Indiana Rangers to recover Dunn's body. After riding about six miles up Wildcat Creek, they found a dead comrade's head stuck on a pole and a Native standing beside the head taunting them. Thirteen Indiana Rangers were outraged by this and chased the rider, but he managed to stay ahead of them, and led them into a narrow canyon. Here, Kickapoo, Winnebago, and Shawnee warriors ambushed the Rangers. Within two minutes, twelve men and several horses were dead or dying. Many of the officers were killed, and the Rangers fled. One man who escaped did so by spurring his horse to gallop faster, hence the naming of the battle "Spur's Defeat".

One man, Benoit Besayon, had been a long-time trader with the Indian villages in the area, and was captured alive in the canyon. He was judged to be a traitor, and sentenced to be burned at the stake. As the fire was lit, however, a friend took pity on him and shot him.

The American losses on November 21–22 were seventeen killed and three wounded.

Scouts learned that a large force of Native Americans were gathering to fight Hopkins' army, and they prepared to do battle as soon as possible. Bitter cold set in, however, and a snowstorm threatened the expedition. When the Indian camp was reached on 24 November, it was deserted. Hopkins turned back, stopping at Fort Harrison to recover from the weather before proceeding to Vincennes. By the time they reached Fort Knox, two hundred men were suffering from sickness or frostbite. Hopkins became so depressed from his successive losses that he resigned. Hopkins was brought before a Court of Inquiry for his actions in the Illinois Territory and Prophetstown. He was cleared of any wrongdoing by the military tribunal and later ran for the Senate.

== Modern investigations ==
Although it has been claimed there was no significant importance to this battle, General William Henry Harrison's military operational plan reflects the overall importance of the expedition. Hopkin's mission was twofold. First, he wanted to drive the hostile Kickapoos to Canada in response to the Fort Dearborn Massacre. Second, he wanted to burn Prophetstown again to drive the Aboriginal Confederacy also towards Canada and out of the Northwest Territories. Hopkin's men encountered 200 mounted Indian warriors which they had never experienced before. This and the weather were the two factors that drove Hopkin's expedition back to Fort Harrison.

The actual site of this esoteric American defeat is unknown. The Carroll County Historical Association has erected a historic marker at the intersection of W 550 S Rd. and S 800 W Rd. in the town of Pyrmont (40.4673532, −86.6800204) noting that the site is "in a nearby ravine". Purdue University and Indiana State archaeologists and historians suggest that there is little scholarly interest in the site and the event because of its lack of importance. Local amateur reenactment groups have taken an interest in commemorating the event. However, the found site has been verified by archeologists donating their time to have found the skirmish site and possible burial location of the 18 men.
