= Wildcat Creek (Indiana) =

River in Indiana, United States

Coordinates: 40°28′14″N 86°51′28″W

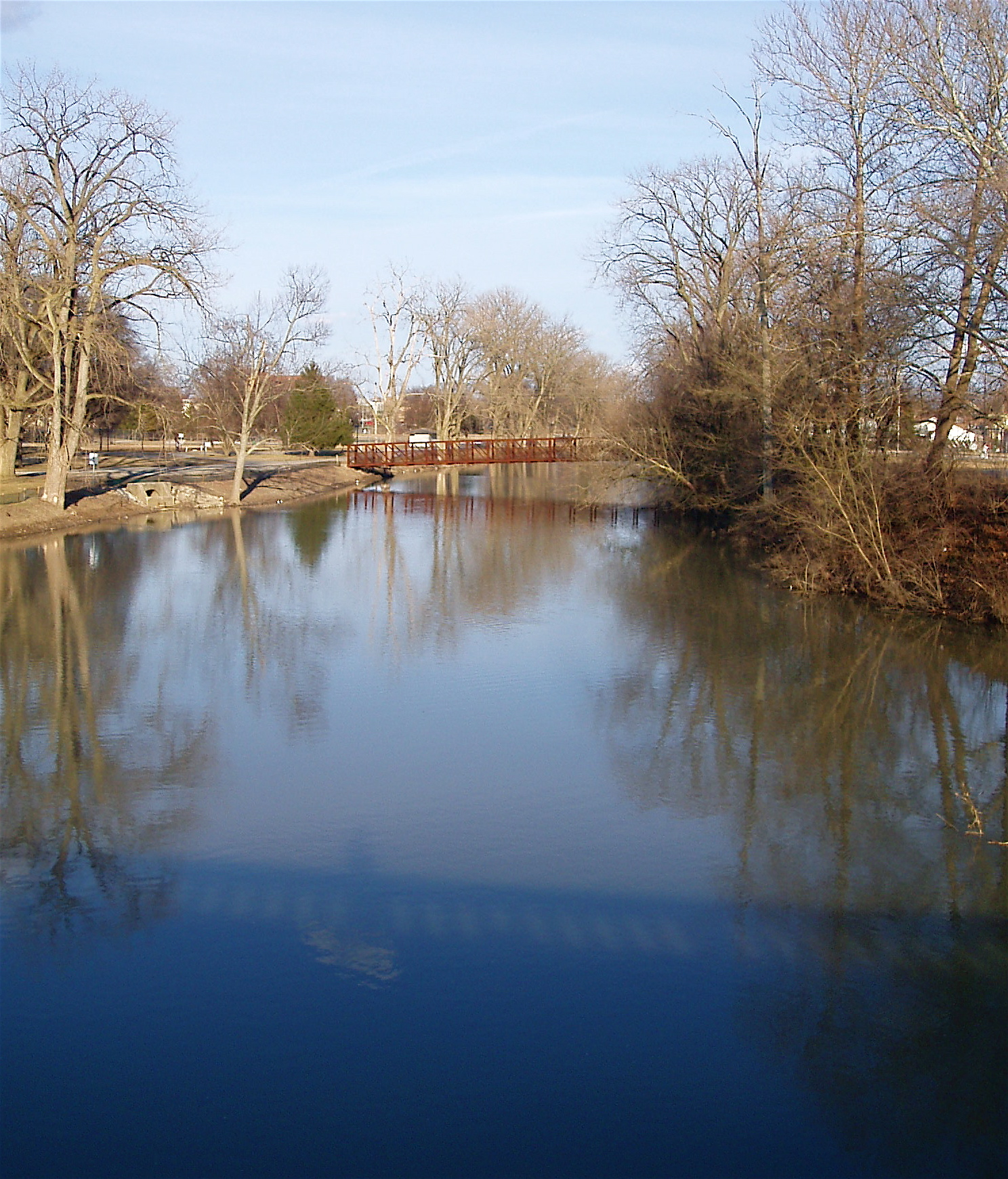
Wildcat Creek at Foster Park, Kokomo

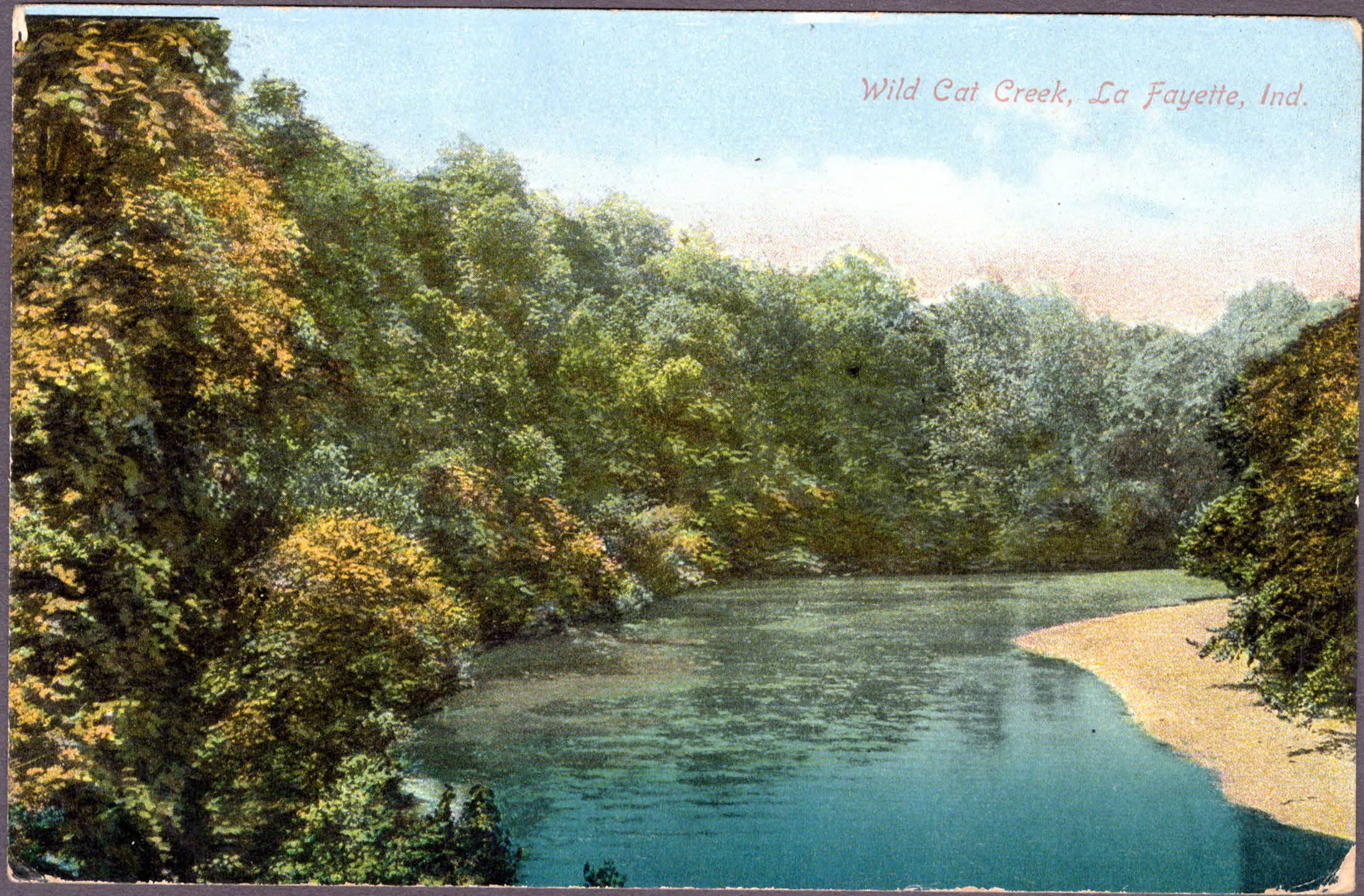
Wild Cat Creek, Lafayette, Indiana

Wildcat Creek is a tributary of the Wabash River in north-central Indiana. The stream is 84 miles (135 km) long and drains an area of 804.2 square miles (2,083 km^{2}). Wildcat Creek consists of three main forks-North, South, and Middle. All forks flow in a general east–west direction through varied topography and land uses, including cropland, pasture, forest and developed areas.

The major tributaries of the Wildcat are the Little Wildcat Creek and the Kokomo Creek. This creek would be known as a river in most areas of the United States due to its width. At its mouth, the estimated mean annual discharge of Wildcat Creek is 817.79 cubic feet per second (23.157 m^{3}/s), according to the US Environmental Protection Agency.

In November 1812, an American military force was defeated in the Battle of Wild Cat Creek, sometimes known as "Spur's Defeat".

The Wildcat travels through Greentown, Kokomo and Burlington before joining the Wabash River near Lafayette. Just west of Greentown, the creek becomes the Kokomo Reservoir. The Wildcat Guardians, a private environmental/recreational organization, works to keep the creek free of litter and debris.

Wildcat Creek is also a Group 5 waterway below dams in Kokomo, and due to high mercury and PCB content, fish are not to be consumed west of the dam.

In February 2014, the Wildcat Creek was featured on CBS Evening News for its ice dam jams, because of the frigid winter season.

== See also ==
- List of rivers of Indiana
