= Indiana Rangers =

- Active: 1807–1809; 1811; 1812–1815
- Disbanded: 1809 (first time); 1811 (second time); June, 1815 (third time)
- Country: United States
- Allegiance: United States; Indiana Territory
- Branch: Indiana Territorial Militia
- Type: Infantry (1807–1809, 1811, 1812–1815); Dragoons (1812–1815)
- Role: Protect Indiana Territory from Indian attacks
- Size: 3 divisions (1807–1809): 1st Division; 2nd Division; 3rd Division 6 companies (1812–1815): (divisions and companies total troops were at their highest approximately 400 men)
- Part of: Territorial Governor William Henry Harrison
- Garrison/HQ: Cuzco, Indiana Territory; Vincennes, Indiana Territory; Fort Vallonia, Indiana Territory
- Equipment: Rifle musket scalping knife tomahawk sword
- Engagements: Battle of Tippecanoe (1811); War of 1812: Peoria War (1812); Second Tippecanoe Campaign (1812); Battle of Wild Cat Creek (1812); Battle of Tipton's Island (1813)

Commanders
- Current commander: Major John Tipton
- Ceremonial chief: Captain William Hargrove
- Colonel of the Regiment: Captain James Bigger

The Indiana Rangers, also known as the Indiana Territorial Mounted Rangers, were a mounted militia formed in 1807 and operated in the early part of the 19th century to defend settlers in Indiana Territory from attacks by Native Americans. The rangers were present at the Battle of Tippecanoe, and served as auxiliaries to the army during the War of 1812. At the peak of their activities they numbered over 400 men.

== History ==
=== Origins ===
==== First formation of Rangers ====
In 1807, the Larkins family was travelling along the Buffalo Trace when they were attacked by a band of Native Americans. The father was killed, and Mrs. Larkins and her five children were taken into captivity. The incident sparked outcries for better protection along the route, and Territorial Governor William Henry Harrison organized the Rangers to provide a fast response to attacks, primarily as a deterrent to random American Indian raids. The Rangers were modeled on the mounted troops used by General Anthony Wayne at the Battle of Fallen Timbers. The primary objective of the Rangers was to safeguard the Buffalo Trace, the main transportation route between Louisville, Kentucky and the Indiana Territory's capital of Vincennes, Indiana (and Illinois Territory), starting on April 20, 1807.

==== Beginning of Ranger Operations ====
The first Indiana Rangers who patrolled the road in 1807 did so on foot. The Rangers had three divisions: Captain William Hargrove's 1st Division patrolled from the Wabash River to French Lick. The 2nd Division patrolled from French Lick to the Falls of the Ohio. One of their bases was at Cuzco, Indiana. The 3rd Division secured an area East along the Ohio River to Lawrenceburg, Indiana, on the Ohio border. All Rangers were paid $1 per day, and were required to supply their own horse, ammunition, tomahawk, a large and small knife, and a leather belt.

==== Final operations and disbandment ====
Although the mounted militia units lacked uniformity, the men—and sometimes women—were well trained. In keeping with their mission, the Indiana Rangers were involved in numerous incidents involving Native Americans. Native Americans and white settlers were considered to be at peace during this time, and the early Rangers were so effective that clashes between Native Americans and white settlers effectively ended. Harrison disbanded the Indiana Rangers in 1809.

=== War of 1812 ===
==== Reformation of the Indiana Rangers ====
As tensions between U.S. settlers and Native Americans increased, the Indiana Rangers were reactivated. Two Rangers companies were raised and stationed in Vincennes, Indiana. Prior to the War of 1812, an Indiana Rangers detachment under Captain William Hargrove detained a British subject they believed was supporting indigenous resistance to white American settlers in Indiana. Resistance to U.S. colonization in the Indiana Territory by Native Americans became more frequent after the outbreak of war, which led to attacks such as the Pigeon Roost raid. During the war, the Rangers were used to augment larger American armies.

==== Battle of Wild Cat Creek ====
General Samuel Hopkins utilized the Rangers in his Second Tippecanoe Campaign (1812), where several were killed at the Battle of Wild Cat Creek.

==== Ambushing Shawnee Native Americans at the Battle of Tipton's Island ====
In April 1813, during the War of 1812, a Shawnee war party killed two white settlers eight miles from Fort Vallonia. The war party continued towards the fort, killing another settler and wounding three more. The Shawnee then put some distance between themselves and the fort, but were soon pursued by 30 Indiana Rangers under Major John Tipton known as "Corydon's Yellow Jackets".

The Shawnee crossed the flooded Driftwood River and, thinking they had lost their pursuers, set up camp on an island in the east fork of the White River, just northeast of modern-day Seymour. One of Tipton's scouts located the trail, however, and the rangers cautiously approached the river. Major Tipton ordered the rangers to maintain absolute silence, and tied one ranger to a tree when he kept talking. The Rangers took ambush positions along the bank of the river and opened fire. The Shawnee were taken by surprise, but returned fire for about half an hour. Few casualties were suffered due to the firing distance across the river and the shelter provided by the wooded island. One Shawnee was killed and several were wounded, but three Shawnees drowned when they tried to swim across the flooded White River.

The Rangers could not pursue the Shawnee across the river, so they returned to Fort Vallonia. There was a victory celebration, but as details of the skirmish emerged, it was determined to be a small engagement against a war party that managed to escape. "Tipton's Island" became a term of ridicule.

==== Joseph Bartholomew's Raid ====
On June 11, 1813, Indiana General Joseph Bartholomew led a force of 137 Rangers to patrol the White River. Bartholomew and his Rangers raided the Native American Delaware villages destroying 1000 bushels of corn, and capturing 3 horses. No Native Americans were seen during the raid, until they found and attacked two Native Americans at a campfire. One was killed and the other escaped, after critically wounding a Ranger. The Rangers withdrew to Fort Vallonia. The wounded ranger, a man named Hays, was brought back to the fort and later died from his wounds.

==== Colonel William Russell's Raid ====
Colonel William Russell used the Rangers to supplement his infantry in the 1812 Peoria War.

That July, Rangers under General Bartholomew supplemented Colonel Russell's mounted force, which traveled 500 miles through the Indiana territory destroying hostile Indian villages. The Americans had located an Indian stockade fort in Miami County Indiana and he burned it to the ground. Russell and his mounted raiders destroyed at least 5 enemy village bases. This raid lasted for about one month. After completing the raid, Russell and his fellow mounted raiders withdrew safely back to Fort Harrison. No Native Americans were seen during the expedition, and no one in Russell's force was lost in the campaign.

==== Further Formations of Rangers and final disbandment ====
In 1813, the federal government authorized an additional four Ranger companies to secure Indiana Territory. The new companies consisted of 100 men each, and as before, they armed and equipped themselves. The officers of the rangers were paid the same as those regular army officers of the same rank. Those with horses were paid a dollar a day, and those without horses were paid 75 cents a day. Following the end of the War of 1812, the Indiana Rangers were discharged from military service in June, 1815.

== Legacy ==
=== People ===
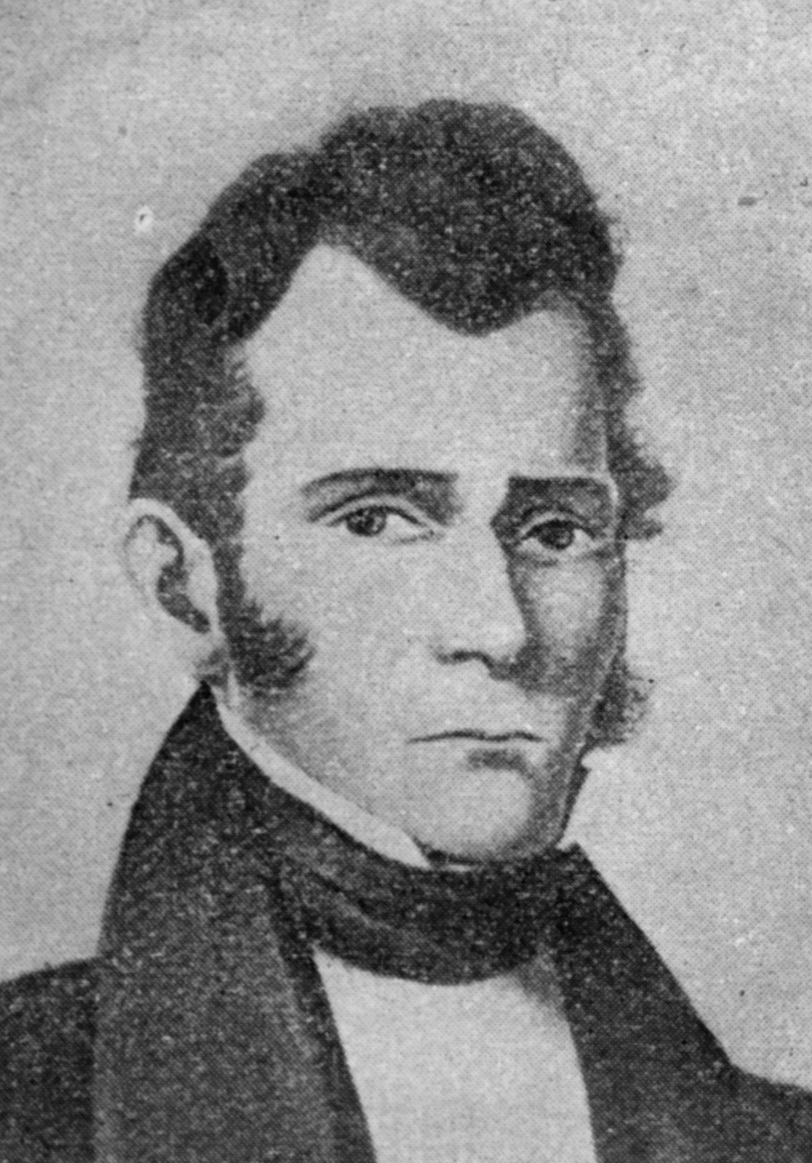
John Tipton was a Major with the Indiana Rangers.

One of the new ranger companies authorized in 1813 was commanded by Captain James Bigger, a veteran of the 1811 Battle of Tippecanoe, although he later had to go to court for recognition of his services with the Rangers. Another of the new rangers was John Ketcham, who built Ketcham's Fort and would later become a judge.

John Tipton served as a major in command of two companies of rangers at Fort Vallonia during the War of 1812. He would later become a United States senator, and is the namesake of Tipton and Tipton County, Indiana.

=== Organizations ===
The Indiana Rangers inspired the creation of the more famous Texas Rangers.

The 151st Infantry Regiment traces its heritage to the pre-statehood Indiana Rangers. The motto of the regiment, "Wide Awake – Wide Awake!" was earned at the Battle of Tippecanoe. Delta Company (Ranger) was the only National Guard Infantry unit to serve intact in Vietnam during the Vietnam War, and called itself the Indiana Rangers.

== See also ==
- United States Rangers in the War of 1812
- Texas Rangers
- Colorado Rangers

== Sources ==
- Allison, Harold (1986). The Tragic Saga of the Indiana Indians. Paducah: Turner Publishing Company. ISBN 0-938021-07-9.
- Barr, Arvil S. (1918). "Warrick County Prior to 1818". Indiana Magazine of History (March 1918). Indiana University, Dept. of History.
- Dean, Thomas (1919). "Journal of Thomas Dean". Indiana Historical Society Publications. v. 6 (1916–19). Indiana Historical Society.
- Ferguson, Rich (2008). "Spur's Defeat by Shawnee in November 1812".
- Wilson, George R.; Thornbrough, Gayle (1946). The Buffalo Trace. Indiana Historical Society Publications, volume 15, number 2. Indianapolis: Indiana Historical Society.
