= Battle of Tipton's Island =

- Part of the War of 1812 and Tecumseh's War
- Major (later Brigadier General) John Tipton, commander of the Indiana Rangers during the engagement.
Date	April 1813
Location	East Fork of the White River (near modern-day Seymour, Indiana)
Result	Indecisive

Belligerents
United States: Indiana Rangers ("Corydon's Yellow Jackets")	Shawnee

Commanders and leaders
John Tipton	Unknown

Strength
30 rangers	Unknown war party

Casualties and losses
None (3 settlers killed, 2 wounded prior to pursuit)	1 killed 3 drowned Several wounded

The Battle of Tipton's Island was a minor engagement fought in April 1813 during the War of 1812 between a detachment of mounted Indiana Rangers and a Shawnee war party. The skirmish took place on an island situated in the East Fork of the White River, located just northeast of modern-day Seymour, Indiana.

Triggered by a series of fatal Native American raids against American homesteaders near Fort Vallonia, the action was led by Major John Tipton. While initially celebrated by local settlers as a defensive triumph, the engagement was ultimately deemed indecisive because the main Shawnee force successfully retreated across the flooded river with minimal casualties. In the decades following the War of 1812, the phrase "Tipton's Island" briefly entered the regional lexicon as a term of ridicule for an over-hyped military achievement.

== Background ==
Following the Battle of Tippecanoe in 1811 and the formal outbreak of the War of 1812, conflicts escalated sharply between American pioneers and Native American tribes allied with the British Empire in the Indiana Territory. Regional instability peaked on September 3, 1812, with the Pigeon Roost massacre in neighboring Clark County (now Scott County), where 24 settlers were killed in a surprise raid.

In response to the pervasive threat of frontier raids, territorial authorities established a defensive perimeter of blockhouses, prominently including Fort Vallonia in Jackson County. Companies of mounted local militia, known as the Indiana Rangers, were deployed to patrol the southern frontier.

In April 1813, a Shawnee war party bypassed Fort Vallonia's immediate defenses, killing two white settlers approximately eight miles from the fortification. The party advanced closer to the fort, killing a third settler and wounding two others. Following the attacks, the Shawnee withdrew northeastward to put distance between themselves and the fort's garrison.

== Pursuit and engagement ==
Upon learning of the killings, Major John Tipton mobilized a force of 30 rangers from a unit historically designated as "Corydon's Yellow Jackets." The rangers tracked the raiding party through a swampy bottomland area known locally as "Rapp's bottoms." The Shawnee forces crossed the swollen, flooded waters of the Driftwood River channel and, believing they had evaded their pursuers, established a temporary camp on a heavily wooded island in the East Fork of the White River.

One of Tipton's advance scouts discovered the fresh trail, guiding the rangers cautiously toward the riverbank directly opposite the island. To ensure a tactical surprise, Tipton ordered his men to maintain absolute silence. According to regional lore and historical logs, when one ranger repeatedly refused to stop speaking, Tipton had the man temporarily tied securely to a tree to prevent him from alerting the camp.

The rangers took up defensive concealed positions along the riverbank and initiated a coordinated volley of gunfire into the island camp. Although caught completely by surprise, the Shawnee forces quickly utilized the dense island timber for cover and returned fire across the water channel. The ensuing firefight lasted for approximately thirty minutes. Because of the significant distance across the flooded river and the heavy defensive cover on both sides, the exchange yielded few direct casualties. One Shawnee warrior was killed on the island and several others were wounded. In an effort to abandon the exposed island position, a portion of the war party attempted to swim across the turbulent, flooded currents of the White River, resulting in three additional Shawnee drowning.

== Aftermath and legacy ==
Unable to cross the dangerous floodwaters to pursue the surviving warriors or secure the island, Tipton ordered his rangers to break off the engagement and return south to Fort Vallonia. Upon arrival, the garrison initially staged an enthusiastic victory celebration, crediting Tipton with halting the immediate raiding threat.

However, as subsequent details of the skirmish emerged, the engagement's tactical limitations became apparent to the local populace. Because the primary Shawnee war party had successfully extracted themselves from the ambush with minimal battlefield losses, critics categorized the expedition as a minor, over-celebrated skirmish. Consequently, the idiom "Tipton's Island" evolved into a satirical colloquial term throughout southern Indiana during the mid-19th century, used to mock an exaggerated victory or an anticlimactic achievement.

Despite the immediate political ribbing, the action did not derail Tipton's trajectory. He later rose to the rank of Brigadier General in the Indiana Militia, served as a United States Indian Agent, and was eventually elected as a United States Senator representing Indiana.

== See also ==
- Indiana Territory in the War of 1812
- Tecumseh's War
