= Fort Harrison, Indiana =

War of 1812 era stockade located in the modern city of Terre Haute, Indiana

Coordinates: 39°30′31″N 87°24′40″W

Siege of Fort Harrison
- Part of the War of 1812
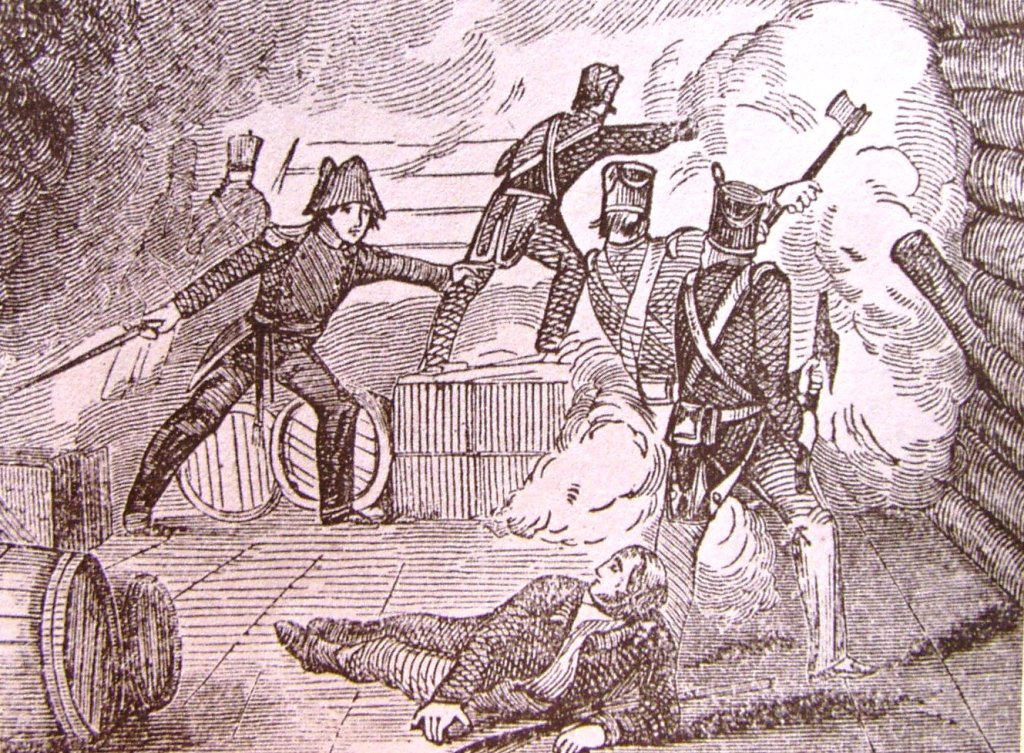
- Captain Zachary Taylor defending Fort Harrison in the War of 1812
Date	September 4–15, 1812
Location	Terre Haute, Indiana, Indiana Territory
Result	American victory

Belligerents
Native Americans Miami Potawatomi Kickapoo Winnebago	United States

Commanders and leaders
Joseph Lenar Stone Eater	Captain Zachary Taylor

Strength
600	20 healthy, 30 sick

Casualties and losses
Unknown – believed to be several killed or wounded	2 killed before battle (civilians); 3 killed, 3 wounded during battle; 18 killed, 2 wounded in supply trains

Fort Harrison was a War of 1812 era stockade constructed in October 1811 on high ground overlooking the Wabash River on a portion of what is today the modern city of Terre Haute, Indiana, by forces under command of General William Henry Harrison. It was a staging point for Harrison to encamp his forces just prior to the Battle of Tippecanoe a month later. The fort was the site of a famous battle in the War of 1812, the siege of Fort Harrison, in September 1812 that was the first significant victory for the US in the war. The fort was abandoned in 1818 as the frontier moved westward.

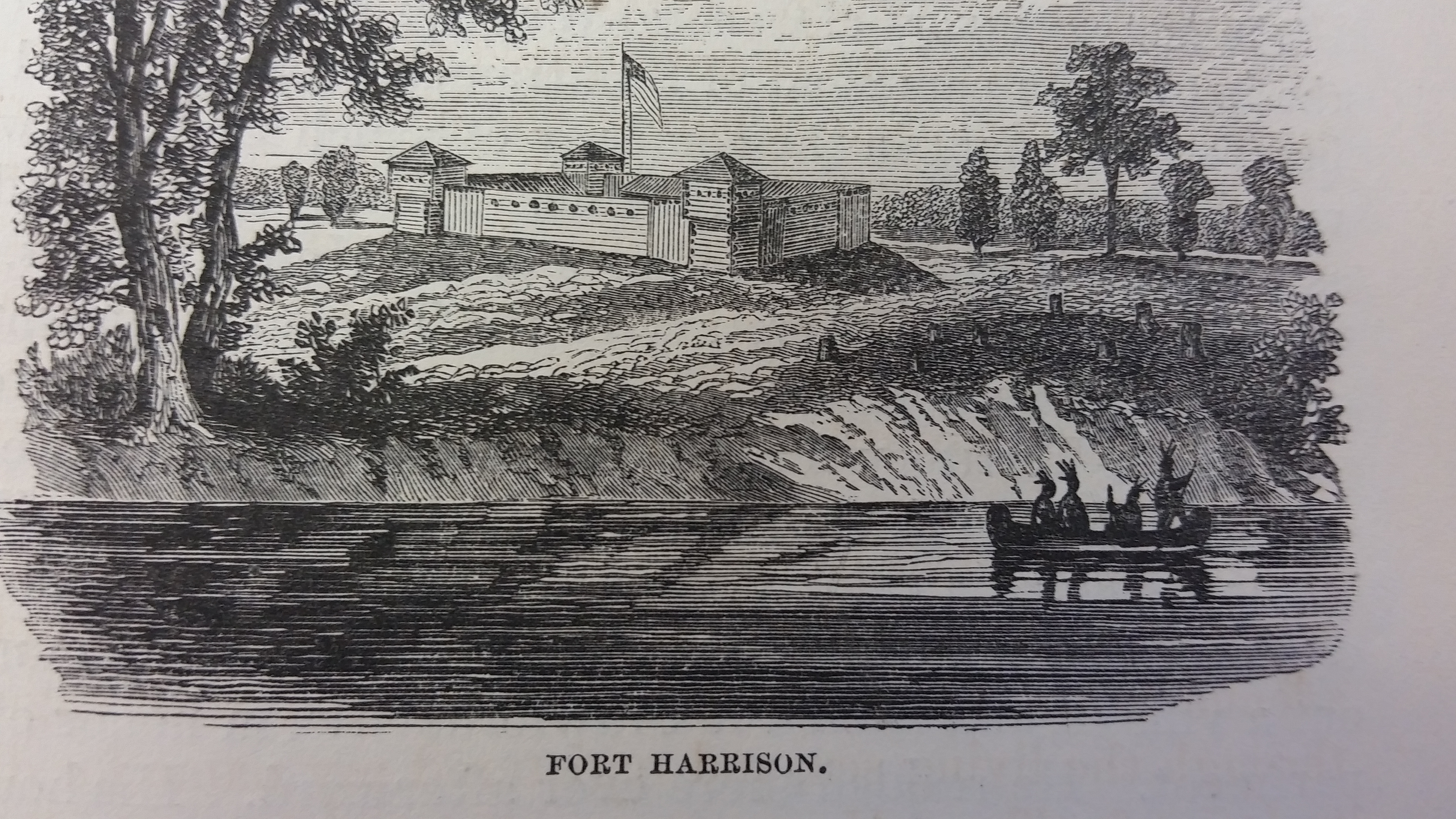
Fort Harrison

== Background ==
In 1811, while General William Henry Harrison marched his army north From Vincennes to meet the Indians at the Battle of Tippecanoe, the army encamped on the high grounds of Terre Haute and constructed a fort overlooking the Wabash River. Harrison had long advocated building a fort in the strategic location.

The fort protected the army's supply lines, as well as the capital of the Indiana Territory downstream in Vincennes. The site, located in present-day Vigo County, Indiana, at the northern edge of Terre Haute, was only two miles from the Wea village of Weauteno. It was said to be the location of a historic battle involving the Illiniwek, and was initially called Camp Bataille des Illinois. Major Joseph Hamilton Daveiss proposed that the stockade be named Fort Harrison in General Harrison's honor. The fort was finished October 28, 1811, and had a 150 feet (46 m) stockade encircling the post. Leaving the fort and a small garrison under Colonel James Miller, Harrison led his army to the Tippecanoe battleground, where it confronted an army led by the Shawnee prophet, Tenskwatawa.

When the army returned, Harrison left Captain Josiah Snelling in command of Fort Harrison, in reward for his performance at Tippecanoe. Snelling served as commandant of the fort from November 11, 1811, until May 1812. During that winter, the fort was shaken by the 1811–12 New Madrid earthquakes. Snelling was later transferred to Fort Detroit.

After the outbreak of the War of 1812, Captain Zachary Taylor, future President of the United States, was ordered by Harrison to leave Fort Knox and assume command of Fort Harrison. The United States had suffered a series of defeats immediately after war was declared, at the hands of the British, Canadians, and Indians. These victories helped motivate other native tribes to take up campaigns against remote American outposts.

== Siege of Fort Harrison ==
The siege of Fort Harrison was an engagement that lasted from September 4 to 12, 1812. it was won by an outnumbered United States force garrisoned inside the fort against a combined Native American force near modern Terre Haute, Indiana. It was the first American land victory during the War of 1812.

On September 3, 1812, a band of Miami arrived and warned Captain Taylor that they would soon be attacked by a large force of Native Americans. That evening, shots were heard, but Taylor was hesitant to send out a scout party. He only had 50 men in his garrison, and sickness had reduced the number of effective soldiers to only 15. In the morning, a party was dispatched and discovered the bodies of two white settlers, the Doyle brothers. The brothers were buried, and the party reported back to Fort Harrison.

Captain Taylor, with his 15 able soldiers and about 5 healthy settlers, made ready for the expected attack. Each of the 20 men was issued sixteen rounds to fire. That day, September 4, a force of 600 Potawatomi (under Chief Pa-koi-shee-can), Wea (under War Chief Stone Eater), Shawnee, Kickapoo and Winnebago warriors approached Fort Harrison. A party of 40 men under command of Kickapoo Chief Namahtoha approached under a flag of truce and asked to parley with Taylor the next morning. Taylor agreed, and the Indian force retreated to camp for the night.

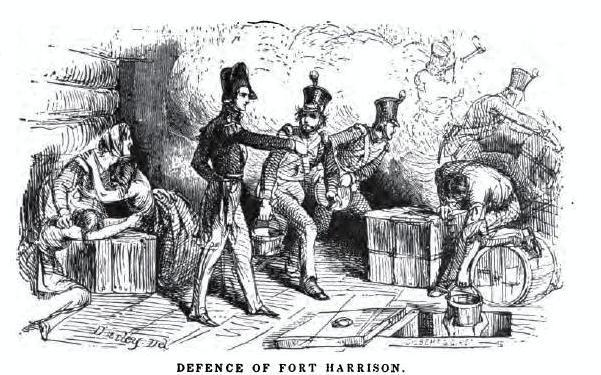
Illustration showing the Battle of Fort Harrison

That night, a warrior crawled up and set the blockhouse on fire. When the sentries opened fire on the arsonist, the 600-strong Indian war party attacked the west side of the fort. Taylor ordered the fort's surgeon and a handful of defenders to control the fire. The blockhouse, which was attached to the barracks, had a store of whiskey, which soon ignited, and the fire raged out of control. Taylor admitted in his report that the situation looked hopeless, and two of his healthy men fled the fort. Warning the fort that "Taylor never surrenders!", the captain organized a bucket brigade to fight the fire before it destroyed the fort's picket walls. One woman, Julia Lambert, even lowered herself down into the fort's well to fill buckets more quickly.

The fire did serve one purpose, in that it illuminated the night, revealing the attackers. The fire left a 20-foot-wide (6 m) gap in the outer wall, which the garrison temporarily sealed with a 5-foot-high (1.5 m) breastwork. The remaining few of the garrison returned the fire of the Indians so fiercely that they were able to hold off the attack. All remaining invalids were armed to maintain defense, while healthy men were put to work repairing the hole left in the fort's walls. The fort was repaired by daybreak of September 5. The Indian force withdrew just beyond gun range and butchered area farm animals within sight of the fort. The garrison and settlers inside the fort, meanwhile, had lost most of their food in the fire, had only a few bushels of corn, and faced starvation.

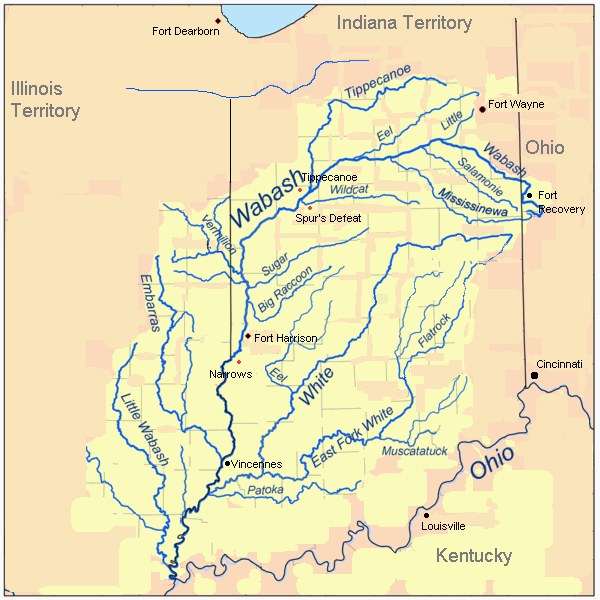
Indiana in 1812

News of the siege arrived in Vincennes as Colonel William Russell was passing through with a company of regular infantry and a company of rangers, on their way to join Ninian Edwards, governor of Illinois Territory. Colonel Russell's companies joined with the local militia and 7th Infantry Regiment and marched to the relief of Fort Harrison. Over 1000 men arrived from Vincennes on September 12, and the Indian force departed. The next day, however, a supply train following Colonel Russell was attacked in what became known as the Attack at the Narrows in modern Sullivan County, Indiana.

=== Attacks at the Narrows ===
Following the relief army to Fort Harrison was a party of thirteen soldiers under Lieutenant Fairbanks of the Seventh Infantry escorting a supply wagon loaded with flour and meat. On September 13, 1812, the supply wagon was ambushed by a Potawatomi war party at a section of the trail known as The Narrows, an area near modern Fairbanks, Indiana, which has many ravines that serve as tributaries to Prairie Creek. When the ambush was launched, the draft horses panicked and ran away with the wagon. Only two men – the wagoneer, John Black, and Private Edward Perdue – managed to escape back to Fort Knox alive, although Perdue was discharged due to the severe wounds he received. Luckily for the two survivors, the Potawatomi gave chase to the runaway supply wagon. Eleven soldiers and all the provisions were lost to the United States, and several Potawatomi warriors had been killed or wounded.

A second column of two supply wagons and fifteen soldiers under Lieutenant Richardson set out from Vincennes two days after the first wagon, following the same trail, and unaware of the fate of the first. When the Potawatomi learned that a second supply train was approaching, they set up the same ambush. On September 15, after the initial attack, Richardson realized he was out-manned, and ordered a retreat. The wagons were left behind to be plundered, which may have saved the lives of the retreating soldiers. Even so, seven men had been killed, and another had been badly wounded.

A battalion under Major McGary discovered the bodies a few days later, and proceeded to Fort Harrison to inform Colonel Russell of the attacks and – more importantly to the half-starved survivors at Fort Harrison – the missing supply wagons.

The Potawatomi party left the Narrows, and attacked the house of a settler named Issac Hutson on September 16, in what became known as the Lamotte Prairie Massacre. Hutson was away, but his wife and four children were all killed.

== Aftermath ==
Artwork for "Fort Harrison March," a campaign song for Zachary Taylor's successful 1848 presidential campaign

- The Battle of Fort Harrison is considered the first land victory of the United States during the War of 1812. The same day, Gen. Harrison's forces relieved Fort Wayne, which eliminated the last Indian threat to Indiana Territory for the remainder of the war.
- In retaliation for the attack on Fort Harrison and the Pigeon Roost Massacre, Colonel Russell continued on to Illinois with the Indiana Rangers and led an expedition against the Kickapoo on Peoria Lake.
- For his services at Fort Harrison, Zachary Taylor received a brevet promotion to major.
- The fort was rebuilt in 1815/16 with a blockhouse at each corner, and abandoned in 1818 after peace was established in Indiana territory.
- Since both William Henry Harrison and Zachary Taylor commanded Fort Harrison, Indiana historians later referred to it as "The Fort of Two Presidents."
- In 1970, the cemetery of the fort was discovered 200 yards south of where the fort was believed to have been sited.
- Many years after the battle, a man found Lieutenant Fairbanks' sword stuck in a log. It was given to the Indiana State Museum.
- Two active infantry battalions of the Regular Army (1-1 Inf and 2-1 Inf) perpetuate the lineages of detachments the old 7th Infantry that were at the siege of Fort Harrison.

== See also ==
- Indiana Territory in the War of 1812
- List of battles fought in Indiana
- List of forts in Indiana
