= John Tipton =

American politician (1786–1839)

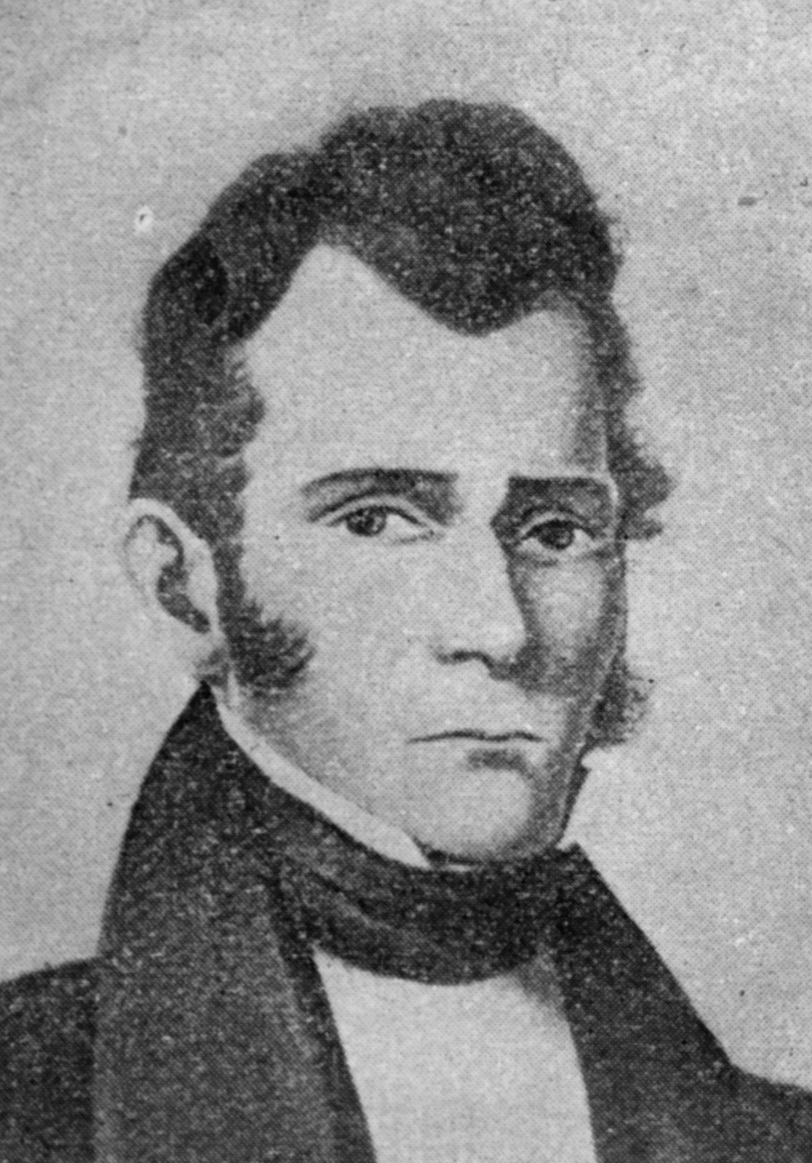
- John Tipton from Who-When-What Book, 1900

United States Senator from Indiana
- In office January 3, 1832 – March 3, 1839
- Preceded by: Robert Hanna
- Succeeded by: Albert S. White

Member of the Indiana House of Representatives
- In office 1819–1823

Personal details
- Born: August 14, 1786 Sevier County, Tennessee
- Died: April 5, 1839 (aged 52) Logansport, Indiana
- Party: Democratic

Military service
- Branch/service: Militia
- Unit: Yellow Jackets
- Commands: Indiana Rangers
- Battles/wars: Tecumseh's War • Battle of Tippecanoe; War of 1812 • Battle of Tipton's Island • Siege of Fort Wayne

John Shields Tipton (August 14, 1786 – April 5, 1839) was from Tennessee and became a farmer in Indiana; an officer in the 1811 Battle of Tippecanoe, and veteran officer of the War of 1812, in which he reached the rank of Brigadier General; and politician. He was elected to the Indiana General Assembly in 1819, and in 1831 as US Senator from the state of Indiana, serving until 1838. He was appointed as US Indian Agent and was selected to lead the militia in removing Menominee's band of Potawatomie in 1838; they were relocated to Kansas, Indian Territory.

== Early life ==
Tipton, a son of Joshua and Janet Shields Tipton, was born in what is now Sevier County, Tennessee. When Tipton was only 6 years old his father was killed by Native Americans. His great uncle, also named John Tipton, was a prominent man in the area. When Tipton was an infant, his uncle's house was besieged by supporters of an effort to create the 14th state in Northeastern Tennessee called the State of Franklin.At the age of 17, Tipton moved to Harrison County, Indiana. In 1806 he married his 1st cousin Martha Shields, a daughter of John Shields of Lewis and Clark fame. He became a farmer. Fighting various Native American tribes in the area, he commanded a militia unit of the Yellow Jackets in the Battle of Tippecanoe campaign in 1811.

== War of 1812 ==
=== Serving at Fort Vallonia ===
He served as Major in command of two companies of Indiana Rangers at Fort Vallonia during the War of 1812 with Great Britain.

=== Engagement at Tipton's Island ===
This engagement at Tipton's Island took place in April 1813 against a Shawnee war party. During the War of 1812, the Shawnee were allied to the British. A Shawnee war party killed 3 white American settlers and wounded a few more near the American Fort of Vallonia. The Shawnee party then fled. An American militia group of 30 men from the Indiana territory known as the Indiana Rangers were led by Major John Tipton pursuing the Shawnee war party. The Shawnee party who thought they had lost their pursuers set up camp on an island in the east fork of the White River. John Tipton and his militia tracked down the Shawnee group. Major Tipton ordered his rangers to maintain absolute silence, and tied one ranger to a tree when he kept talking. The militia rangers silently advanced further and quietly took positions along the bank of the river. The American militia rangers opened fire taking the Shawnee by surprise. The Shawnee and American militia rangers fired at each other for about half an hour. One Shawnee was killed. The Shawnee then escaped across the flooded White River, but 3 Shawnee warriors drowned to death when trying to swim to safety. Several other Shawnee were wounded while escaping. The militia rangers could not pursue the Shawnee across the river. So John Tipton and his Indiana Rangers of the Indiana militia who suffered no casualties withdrew back to Fort Vallonia.

=== Battle of Stoney Creek ===
On the 6th of June 1813, he fought at the Battle of Stoney Creek, Ontario, Canada.

=== Promotion at the end of the War ===
When peace was declared, Tipton was promoted to Brigadier-General.

== Aftermath ==
Tipton's marriage eventually fell apart and he was divorced in 1816. He entered politics, being elected as a member of the Indiana State House of Representatives and serving two terms, from 1819 to 1823. During this time, he founded the town of Columbus, Indiana originally known as Tiptonia. Tipton was later appointed as the highway commissioner for the State of Indiana and was assigned to building a highway from Indianapolis, Indiana to Louisville, Kentucky. When the road approached Columbus, Tipton constructed the first bypass road ever built; it detoured south around the west side of Columbus en route to Seymour. He also participated in commissions to establish a new state capital for Indiana and to set the boundaries between Indiana and Illinois. In 1823, he was appointed as the United States Indian agent for the Potawatomi and Miami tribes.

In 1825, he married again, this time to Matilda Spencer, the daughter of the late Captain Spier Spencer. Her father died at the Battle of Tippecanoe in 1811.

In 1831, Tipton was elected by the state legislature to a seat in the United States Senate from Indiana to fill the unexpired term of James Noble who had died. He was reelected to a full term in 1832. A member of the United States Democratic Party, Tipton was a strong supporter of Andrew Jackson.

He served as chairman of the committees on roads and canals and Native American affairs from 1837 to 1839. In 1838, at the behest of Governor David Wallace, Tipton was selected as captain of the militia to organize the forced removal of 859 Potawatomi from the vicinity of Plymouth, to which they had agreed by treaty. He started the group on the two-month-long "Trail of Death" to Kansas. More than 40 of the Natives died, most of them children.

== Death and legacy ==
Tipton declined to run for reelection due to poor health, and his term expired a month before his death. He died in Logansport, Indiana by heart failure. He is interred in Mount Hope Cemetery in Logansport, Indiana.

The towns of Tipton, Indiana, and Iowa, and Tipton County, Indiana are named after him.

U.S. Senate
Preceded by Robert Hanna	U.S. senator (Class 1) from Indiana; 1832–1839; Served alongside: William Hendricks and Oliver H. Smith	Succeeded by Albert S. White
