= Samuel Hopkins (Kentucky politician) =

American politician

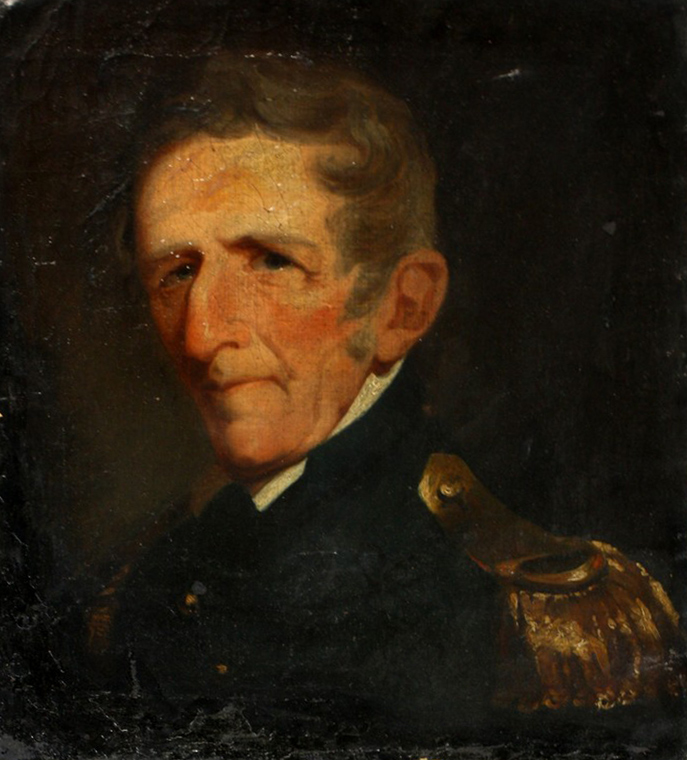
- Oil on canvas painting of Samuel Hopkins

Member of the U.S. House of Representatives from Kentucky's 5th district
- In office March 4, 1813 – March 3, 1815
- Preceded by: Henry Clay
- Succeeded by: Alney McLean

Member of the Kentucky Senate
- In office 1809–1813

Member of the Kentucky House of Representatives
- In office 1800–1806

Personal details
- Born: April 9, 1753 Albemarle County, Virginia Colony
- Died: September 16, 1819 (aged 66) Henderson, Kentucky
- Party: Democratic-Republican

Military service
- Allegiance: United States
- Branch/service: Continental Army; Kentucky Militia
- Rank: Major General
- Commands: Commander in chief of the Western Frontier
- Battles/wars: American Revolutionary War; War of 1812

Samuel Hopkins (April 9, 1753 – September 16, 1819) was an American lawyer, soldier, and politician who served as the U.S. representative from Kentucky's 5th congressional district. Hopkin's served on the staff of General George Washington during the American Revolutionary War and later settled in Kentucky. Here he served in both the state house and state senate. He served as a Major General of the Kentucky Militia during the War of 1812 and was elected to the 13th Congress as a Democratic-Republican.

== Biography ==
Samuel Hopkins was born in Albemarle County in the Virginia Colony, the son of Dr. Samuel Hopkins and Isabella Taylor Hopkins. He served in the Revolutionary War under the command of George Washington as part of the 10th Virginia Regiment. He saw action at the battles of Trenton, Princeton, Brandywine and was seriously injured during the Battle of Germantown where his battalion was nearly destroyed. Hopkins was promoted to Lieutenant Colonel and led the 10th Virginia during the Siege of Charleston. He was captured during the siege and later released in an exchange.

In 1796, Hopkins moved to Kentucky and settled on the Ohio River in 1797 at a point then called Red Banks. He was an agent of the Transylvania Company and surveyed the area which was eventually established as Henderson Country. Here he studied law, was admitted to the bar, and began his political career. He was appointed Chief Justice of the First Court of Criminal Law and Chancery in 1799 and served until his resignation in 1801. He served as a member of the State House of Representatives in 1800, 1801, and 1803–1806 and later served in the Kentucky State Senate from 1809 to 1813. He supported the Kentucky and Virginia Resolutions and was sympathetic to Aaron Burr during his trials for alleged treason.

In 1812, Hopkins was appointed Commander in Chief of the western frontier (Illinois and Indiana Territory), with the rank of major general. He participated in the Peoria War and was the commander at Spur's Defeat; after these series of losses, he resigned from active duty.

Hopkins was elected as a Democratic-Republican to the Thirteenth Congress (March 4, 1813 – March 3, 1815). He was not a candidate for renomination in 1814.

Samuel Hopkins retired to his country estate, Spring Garden, near Henderson, Kentucky, and died there September 16, 1819. He was interred in the family burying ground at Spring Garden.

Hopkinsville, Kentucky, was named for him by the Kentucky Assembly in 1804, as was Hopkins County, Kentucky two years later.

U.S. House of Representatives
Preceded by Henry Clay	Member of the U.S. House of Representatives from Kentucky's 5th congressional district 1813–1815	Succeeded by Alney McLean
