= William Russell (Kentucky politician) =

American politician

Colonel William Russell III (March 6, 1758 – July 3, 1825) was a soldier, pioneer, and politician from Virginia and Kentucky.

He was born in Culpeper County, Virginia to William Russell and Tabitha (Adams) Russell. William Sr. was a prominent citizen of southwestern Virginia and served as a colonel in the Continental Army during the American Revolutionary War. In 1773, the elder Russell took his family, including William Jr., westward in the first attempt to establish a permanent white settlement in Kentucky. The attempt, guided by Daniel Boone, was abandoned after a fatal attack by American Indians. Boone's son, James Boone, and Henry Russell, a son of William Russell, were captured and tortured to death by the Native Americans.

During the American Revolution, William Russell Jr. was a captain in the Virginia militia, taking part in the Battle of Kings Mountain as an aide to Colonel William Campbell. At the war's end, he moved to Kentucky, settling in 1783 in Fayette County on land granted to his father for military service.

Russell served again as a colonel of Kentucky militia in the Northwest Indian War. During the War of 1812, he was colonel of the 7th Infantry Regiment, taking part in the Siege of Fort Harrison and the Peoria War. Colonel Russell led a raid on July 1, 1813, with at least 700 mounted rangers and traveled 500 miles through the Indiana territory destroying hostile Indian villages. He had located an Indian stockade fort in Miami County, Indiana and he burned it to the ground. Russell and his mounted raiders destroyed five enemy village bases. This raid lasted for about one month. After completing the raid, Russell and his fellow mounted raiders withdrew safely back to Fort Harrison. Not one American soldier was lost in the raiding campaign.

Russell was a delegate in the Virginia state House of Representatives in 1790 and 1791, and after Kentucky's statehood, he served in the lower house in 1792, from 1796 to 1800, in 1802, and finally 1823.

Russell County, Kentucky and Fort Russel Township, Illinois is named for him, but Russellville, Kentucky and Russell County, Virginia were named for his father.
