= Pigeon Roost State Historic Site =

Site of an 1812 massacre of settlers by Native Americans in Indiana, United States

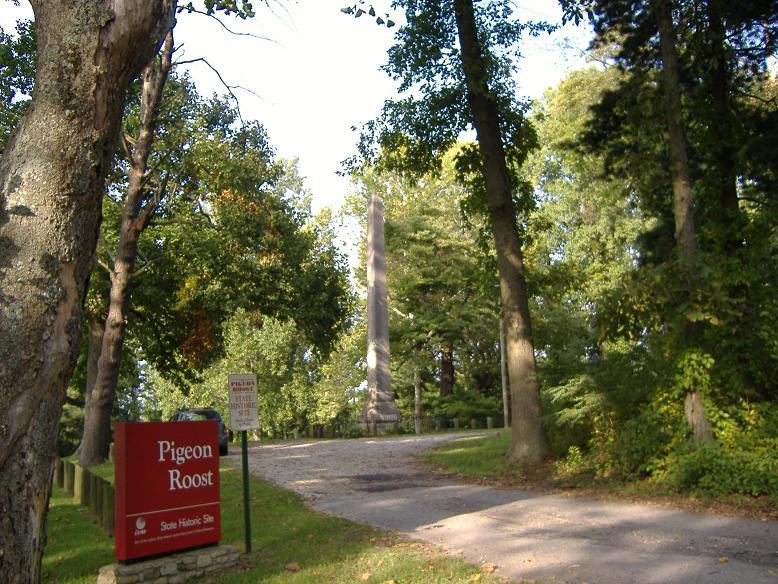

Pigeon Roost State Historic Site is located between Scottsburg and Henryville, Indiana, United States. A one-lane road off U.S. Route 31 takes the visitor to the site of a village where Native Americans massacred 24 settlers shortly after the War of 1812 began.

== Pigeon Roost Village ==
Pigeon Roost was established in 1809 by William E. Collings (1758–1828), and consisted mainly of settlers from Kentucky. Collings and his large family held the original land grants in what is now Nelson County, Kentucky, signed by the Governor of Virginia, Patrick Henry. These land grants were deemed illegal. After the passage of the Northwest Ordinance, many squatters moved across the Ohio River and occupied Shawnee lands in southern Indiana. Families living in what is today Scott, Clark, Jefferson and Washington Counties still can often trace their ancestry back to these early settlers.

The town was named Pigeon Roost because of the great number of passenger pigeons in the area. The settlement consisted of a single line of cabins stretching north and south approximately one mile north of the present town of Underwood. The nearest Native village was located some 20 miles north near the Muskatatuck River. None of the Natives from this settlement are believed to have taken part in the attack on Pigeon Roost. The closest forts (called "blockhouses") were one to the north in Vienna in present-day Scott County and another built by Zebulon Collings to the south near what is now Henryville in Clark County.

== Pigeon Roost massacre ==
Pigeon Roost Massacre
- Part of the War of 1812 and the American Indian Wars
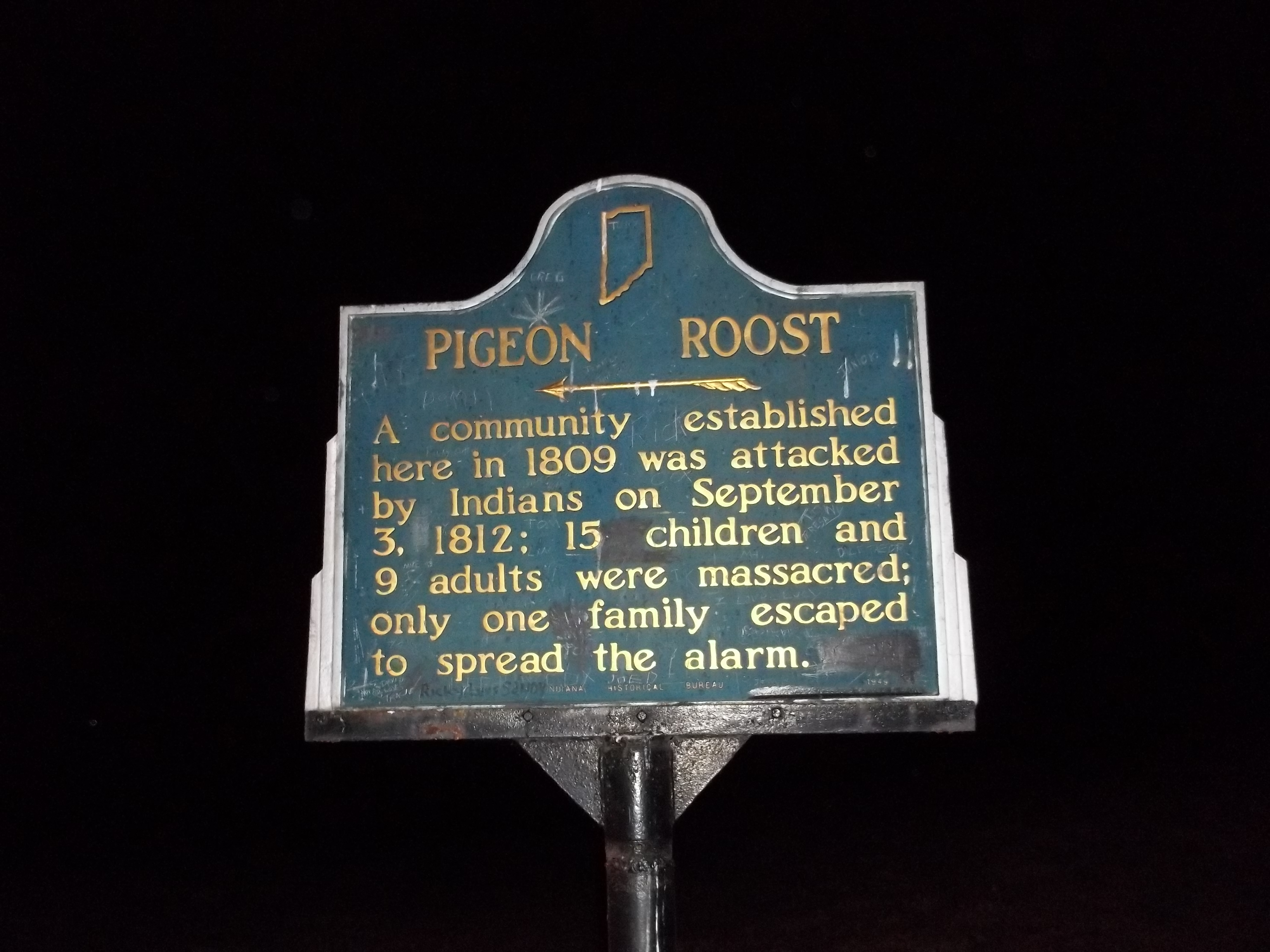
- Indiana historical marker
- Location: 38.617181°N 85.773709°W; Between Scottsburg, Vienna Township, Scott County, Indiana and Henryville, Monroe Township, Clark County, Indiana, US
- Date: September 3, 1812 –
- Attack type: Mass murder
- Deaths: 24 christian settlers 4 Shawnee warriors
- Perpetrators: Mostly Shawnees possibly some Delawares and Potawatomis

On September 3, 1812, a small party of Indigenous people (mostly Shawnee, but possibly including some Delawares and Potawatomis) led by Missilimetaw (or Missilemotaw), made a surprise attack on the village, which appeared to be coordinated with attacks on Fort Harrison (near Terre Haute, Indiana) and Siege of Fort Wayne the same month. In all, twenty-four settlers, including fifteen children, were killed, and two children were taken. Only four of the Native American party were killed.

The Native Americans first came across two hunters near Pigeon Roost and attacked them. They then proceeded to the village, where they struck the cabin of Elias Payne. According to hear-say, Payne's wife and seven children were all killed and scalped; Elias was later found by the Natives in the woods with his brother-in-law Isaac Coffman, and they, too, were killed. Elias Payne had been only wounded, but with no one to tend his wounds, he bled to death. Payne's grave was later destroyed during construction of Interstate 65.

Some settlers managed to escape to the blockhouse of Zebulon Collings, but the Collings family lost many members. Henry Collings was killed and his pregnant wife stabbed to death. According to a journal entry by Henry's brother-in-law, George Heinrich Crist, "Henry lived to tell that little Kill Buck shot him". Henry Collings's brother, Richard, was serving in the army under General William Henry Harrison, but his wife and seven children were among the dead. There is little documented evidence for most of the accounts offered.

William Collings' actions during the attack have been the subject of conjecture. One account has him killing four Natives single-handedly and then holding off the remainder of the attackers with broken or unloaded rifles. Another version says Collings and his youngest son sneaked out the back of his cabin and hid in a nearby cornfield, until they finally were able to escape to Zebulon Collings's blockhouse. A third account (from a journal of George Heinrich Crist, Jr) states Capt. John Norris was at the home William Collings. "If Captain John Norris had not been at Uncle Williams, him and John and Lydia would most likely been killed."

The wife of John Biggs, a sister of William Collings, heard the war party approach her cabin, and fled with her three children to hide in a thicket. The raiders could tell the cabin had just been evacuated, so they burned it and searched for the family. As one of the Natives approached the thicket, the youngest child began to whimper, and Mrs. Biggs stuffed her shawl into the infant's mouth to keep it from betraying their hiding place. When the raiding party moved on, the Biggs family was able to reach Zebulon Collings's blockhouse, but the infant had died of suffocation.

As news of the massacre spread, the other Pigeon Roost settlers fled and assembled at Zebulon Colling's blockhouse. The Native war party left before the local militia, based in Charlestown, could react. Over one hundred militiamen, led by Major John McCoy, mustered the next day, and followed the attackers as far as the Muscatatuck River, where the trail was lost. Some militia men believed they would have fared better had they been led by General Joseph Bartholomew, who was away from home. A force of Indiana Rangers from Washington County, Indiana under Captain Henry Dawalt intercepted the Pigeon Roost raiders at Sand Creek (in modern Bartholomew County, Indiana). One of the rangers, John Zink, was shot and later died, but the war party was able to escape with only a few casualties.

According to contemporary reports, the leader of the attack was rumored to be a Native named Missilemotaw. He was captured on September 20, 1813, and under threat of death confessed he had led the raid. He claimed to be a close confidant of the Native chieftain Tecumseh and told his captors the British had been supplying the Natives with arms and equipment since 1809 in preparation for war.

The massacre was the first Native American attack against U.S. settlers in Indiana during the War of 1812. It is sometimes stated to be part of the larger conflict between the U.S. and Native Americans in the Northwest Territory, though other historians point to previous interactions between the Natives and their victims as a source of motivations behind the massacre. One of the massacre's victims reported the name of his assailant prior to succumbing to his wounds, proving his acquaintance with the attacker. According to historian Lewis Baird, "The Pigeon Roost massacre was not an Native raid as has been so often stated. The Natives passed through the little hamlet which was the nucleus of Vienna and never harmed a soul, while there. There had been bad blood between the Collins family and the Natives for some time. The Collins boys had stolen a fawn from the Natives and refused to give it up, and from this cause and possibly some other, the whole trouble originated. Those other than Collinses were killed only because they lived in that neighborhood. Neither before nor after the massacre were other white people harmed, showing conclusively that it was only a local fight and giving no cause for alarm to other settlers."

The Pigeon Roost settlement was rebuilt, but was eventually abandoned. Most of the victims were buried in a mass grave, to include members of the Collings and Richey families. Indiana Ranger John Zink was buried in Salem, Indiana's Brock Cemetery.

== Memorials ==
In 1904 the state of Indiana authorized $2,000 to build a memorial to the victims of the Pigeon Roost Massacre. It is a 44-foot-tall (13 m) obelisk and the area was made a state historic site in 1929.

Recently, new historic markers were placed on US-31 at the entrance to the site and a picnic shelter was built. The state has turned the site over to Scott County. This year a log cabin was built on the site, similar to the ones that would have been built by the early settlers. An annual picnic is held on the site, the second Sunday in September.

== Gallery ==
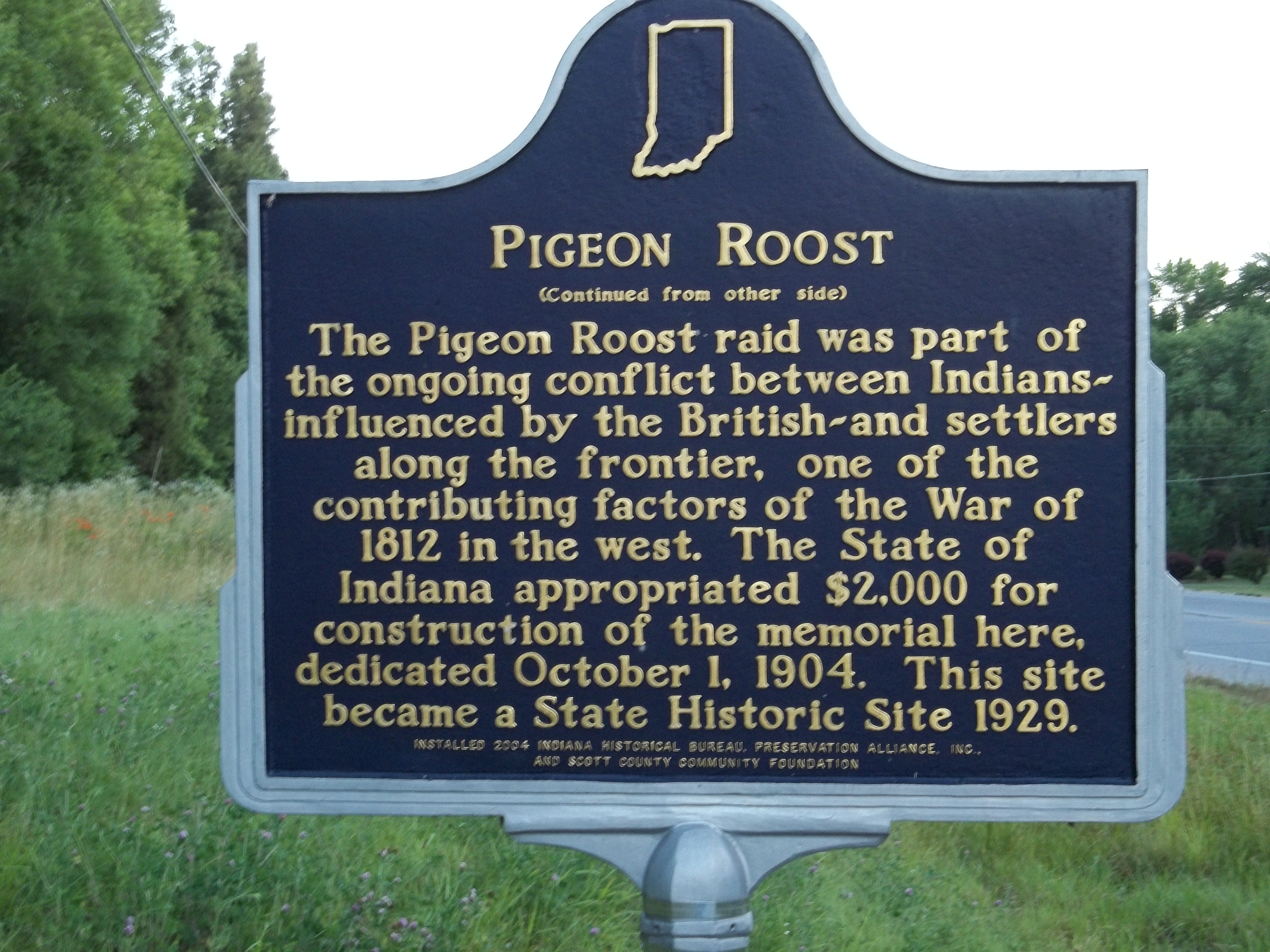
Historical marker for the Pigeon Roost settlement on IN state Hwy 31.

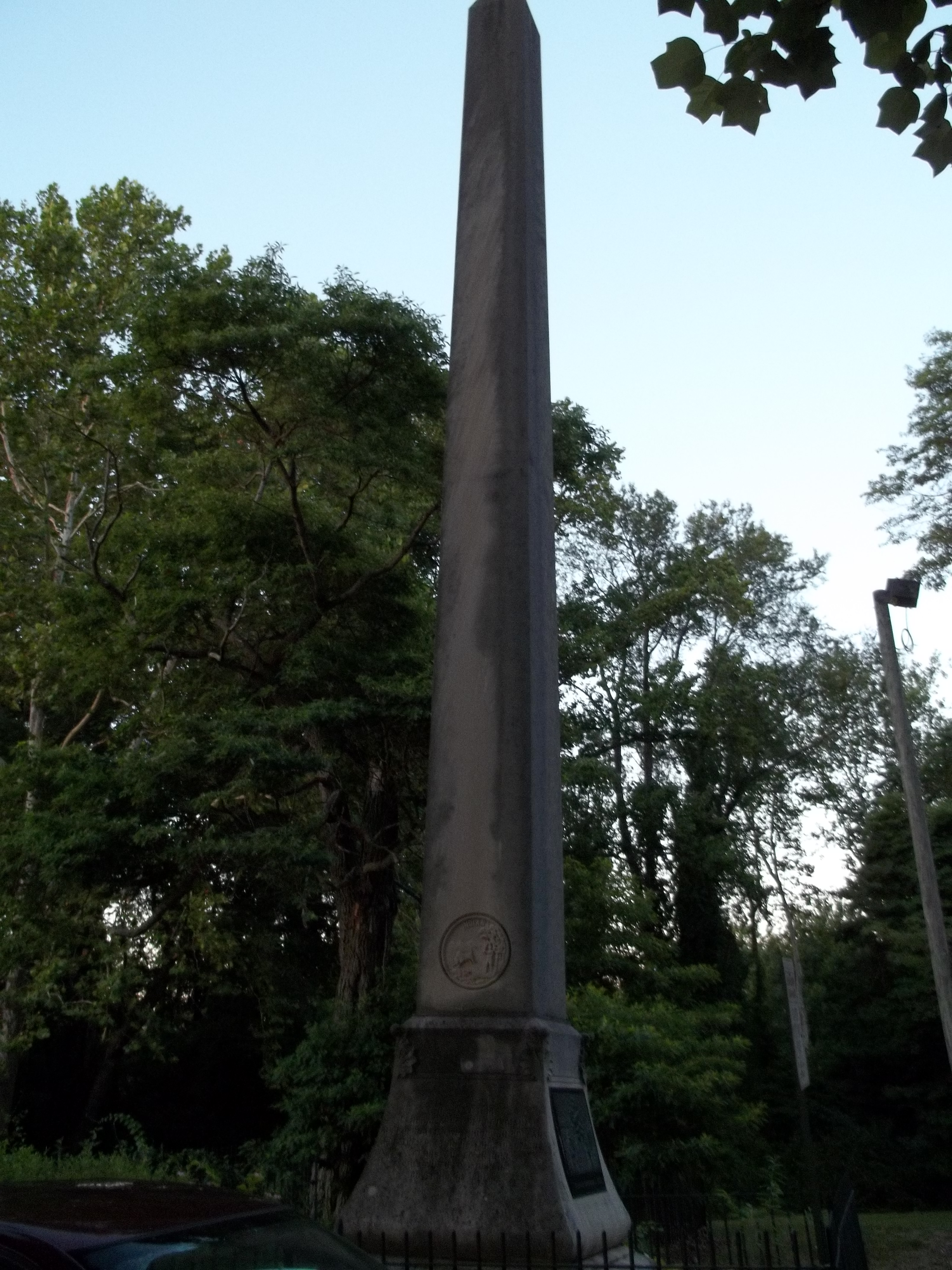
40 ft tall Memorial made of Bedford limestone, raised in 1903 and dedicated October 1, 1904

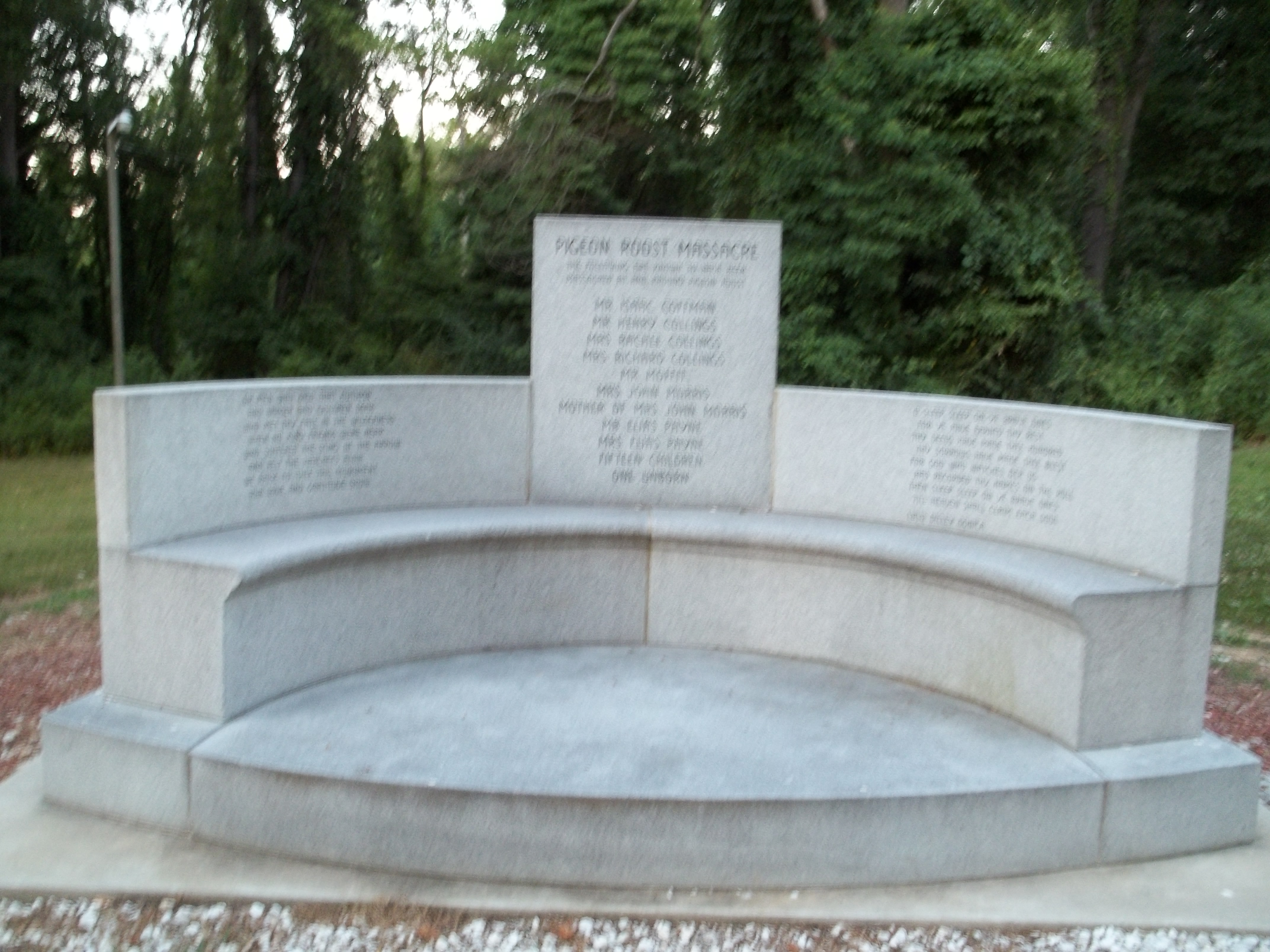
Memorial to the families of the Pigeon Roost attack, located next to the Sassafras tree.

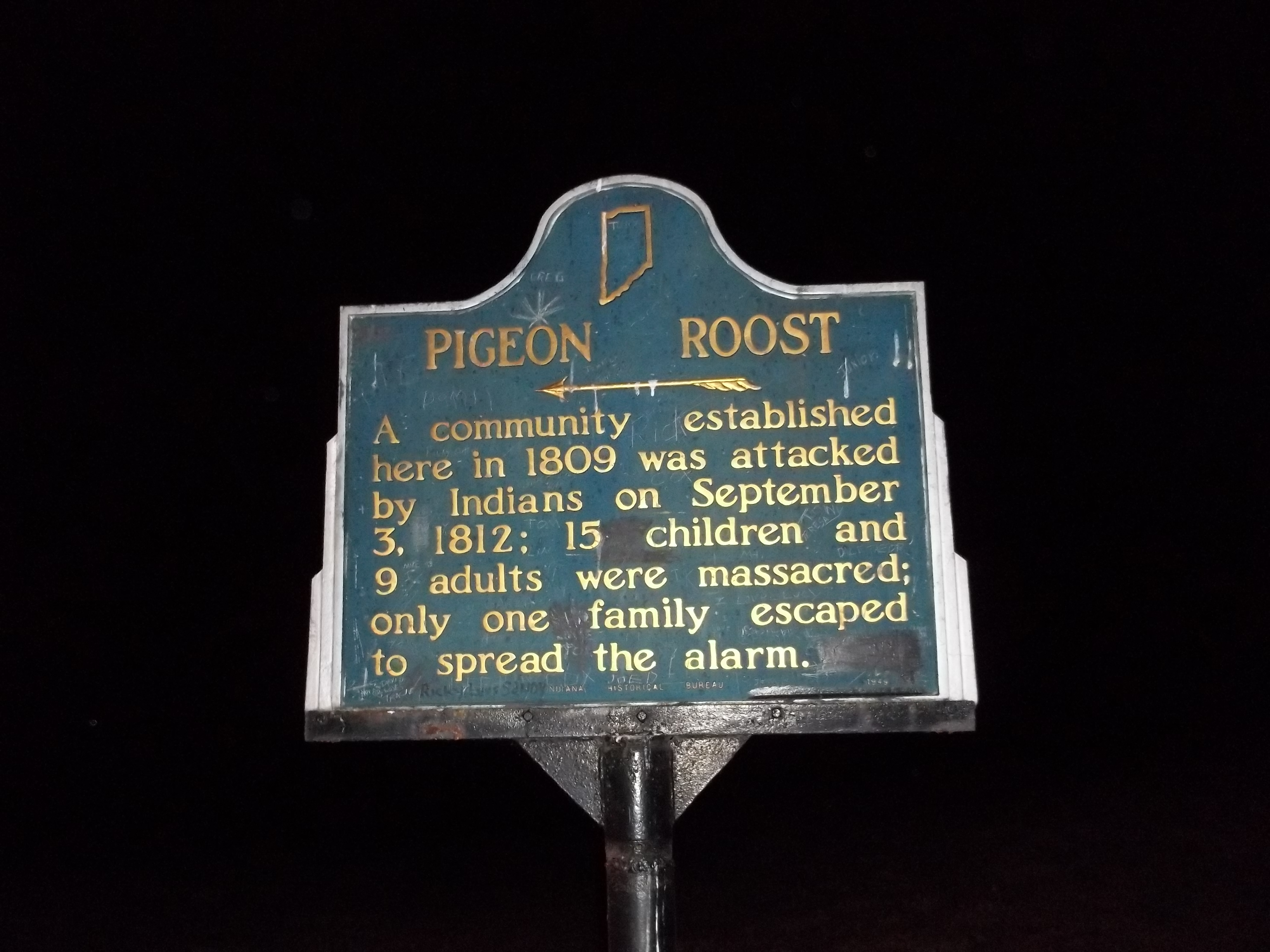
Marker located next to memorial, with massacre information.
