= Campbell's Island, Illinois =

Island and settlement in Rock Island County, Illinois

Campbell's Island
- Unincorporated community
- Location of Campbell's Island within Illinois Campbell's Island (the United States)
- Coordinates: 41°32′26″N 90°25′48″W
- Country: United States
- State: Illinois
- County: Rock Island County
- Township: Hampton Township

Area
  - Total: 0.74 sq mi (1.91 km^{2})
  - Land: 0.45 sq mi (1.17 km^{2})
  - Water: 0.28 sq mi (0.73 km^{2})
- Elevation: 568 ft (173 m)

Population (2020)
  - Total: 275
  - Density: 606.4/sq mi (234.12/km^{2})
- Time zone: UTC-6 (CST)
  - Summer (DST): UTC-5 (CDT)
- FIPS code: 17-10786
- GNIS feature ID: 28064664

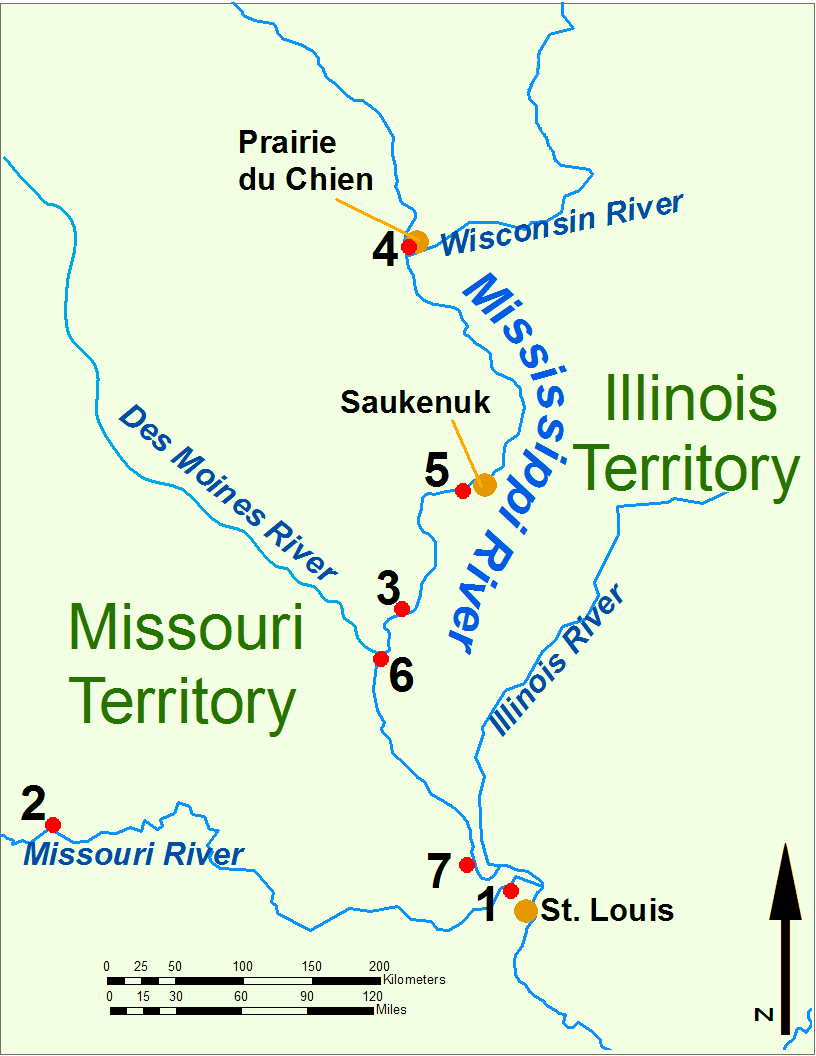
The Upper Mississippi River during the War of 1812. 1: Fort Bellefontaine U.S. headquarters; 2: Fort Osage, abandoned 1813; 3: Fort Madison, defeated 1813; 4: Fort Shelby, defeated 1814; 5: Battle of Rock Island Rapids, July 1814 and the Battle of Credit Island, Sept. 1814; 6: Fort Johnson, abandoned 1814; 7: Fort Cap au Gris and the Battle of the Sink Hole, May 1815.

Campbell's Island is an island and unincorporated community in the Mississippi River. The island is located in Hampton Township, Rock Island County, Illinois. It is adjacent to the city of East Moline and is connected to the city by a bridge. It is the site of the Campbell's Island State Memorial, a listed historic site overseen by the Illinois Historic Preservation Agency.

As of the 2020 census, Campbell's Island had a population of 275.

== History ==
=== War of 1812 ===
Campbell's Island was the site of the Battle of Rock Island Rapids, one of the westernmost battles of the War of 1812, when a band of approximately 500 Sauk warriors allied with the British Army clashed on July 19, 1814, with an American force led by Lieutenant John Campbell of the 1st U.S. Regiment of Infantry. Campbell was leading three gunboats along the Mississippi River to carry military supplies to Fort Shelby, located at the present site of Prairie du Chien, Wisconsin. One boat carried 42 people – soldiers of the 1st U.S. Regiment of Infantry and members of their families. The other two boats carried 66 U.S. Rangers. The British-allied Indians attacked the flotilla in their canoes and forced Campbell to turn back. The American loss was 8 men of the 1st Regiment killed and 16 wounded;4 Rangers killed and 8 wounded. This victory helped to enable the Sauk to maintain their control over the Quad Cities area for almost 20 more years. The Campbell's Island State Memorial, dedicated in 1908, commemorates this battle.

However, the movement of Euro-American militiamen and families into northwestern Illinois continued, and in the Black Hawk War of 1832 the Sauk were decisively defeated. The Quad Cities area was "opened to settlement," and Campbell's Island was named in honor of the loser of the 1814 battle, John Campbell.

Five currently active infantry battalions of the Regular Army (1-1 Inf, 2-1 Inf, 1-3 Inf, 2-3 Inf and 4-3 Inf) perpetuate the lineages of elements of the old 1st and 7th Infantry Regiments that were at the Battle of the Rock Island Rapids.

=== Early 1900s ===
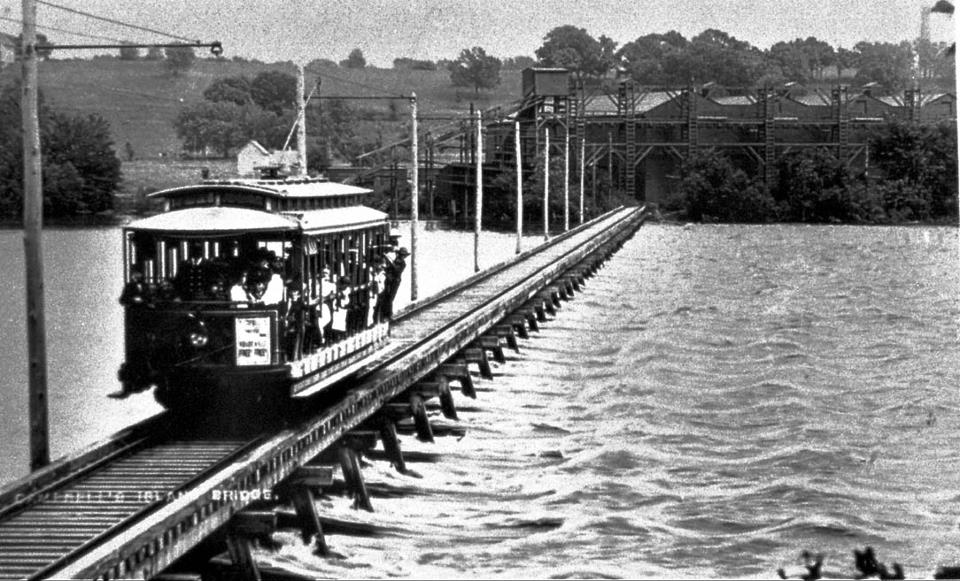
Streetcar connecting Campbell's Island to Watertown (now East Moline)

At the turn of the 20th century, Campbell's Island was bought by a streetcar company who intended to build an amusement park which would have covered the island. In 1904 the first streetcar bridge was constructed atop a closing dam that had been built by the Army Corps of Engineers in 1899.

Campbell's Island was a popular resort area in the early to mid 20th century. Cottages were available for rent, and some of the more affluent built their own summer cabins. Extra streetcars were added to the island in the mornings and afternoons to accommodate seasonal residents traveling to and from work in the cities.

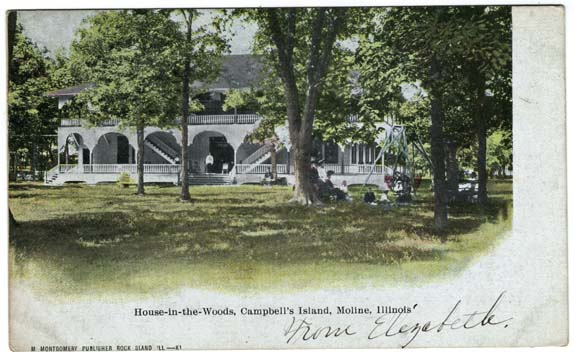
House-In-The-Woods Inn, 1907

The House-In-the-Woods, built in 1904, offered dining on the first floor and orchestra concerts in the ballroom on the second floor. It was destroyed by fire in 1911, but rebuilt the following spring and eventually renamed The Campbell's Island Inn. In the late 1950s the inn became the Ship's Wheel Boat Club, encompassing a visitor's dock and marina. After surviving flood damage in 1965, the boat club and marina burned down in 1979.

=== Today ===
The size and shape of Campbell's Island has been somewhat variable in historic times, due to additions and subtractions created by the power of the Mississippi River. Today, the island is approximately 1.25 miles (2 km) long and 0.5 miles (0.8 km) wide. It is the home of a suburban community that dwells on a ring road that circles the island. The low-lying Campbell's Island is subject to flooding, and many of the island homes are raised, built on stilts, or otherwise constructed so as to minimize damage during periods of high water such as the Great Flood of 1993. The bridge to East Moline was built in 1938 and completely rebuilt in 1999.

The Rock Island Rapids, a riffle in the Upper Mississippi River after which the 1814 battle was named, has disappeared. The riffle was replaced in 1934 by Lock and Dam No. 15, an engineering structure several miles downstream from Campbell's Island.

== Demographics ==
Historical population
Census	Pop.	Note	%±
2020	275		—
U.S. Decennial Census

Campbell's Island first appeared as a census designated place in the 2020 U.S. census.

=== 2020 census ===
Campbell's Island CDP, Illinois – Racial and ethnic composition Note: the US Census treats Hispanic/Latino as an ethnic category. This table excludes Latinos from the racial categories and assigns them to a separate category. Hispanics/Latinos may be of any race.
Race / Ethnicity (NH = Non-Hispanic)	Pop 2020	% 2020
White alone (NH)	247	89.82%
Black or African American alone (NH)	1	0.36%
Native American or Alaska Native alone (NH)	1	0.36%
Asian alone (NH)	0	0.00%
Native Hawaiian or Pacific Islander alone (NH)	0	0.00%
Other race alone (NH)	0	0.00%
Mixed race or Multiracial (NH)	8	2.91%
Hispanic or Latino (any race)	18	6.55%
Total	275	100.00%

== Education ==
It is in the East Moline School District 37 and the United Township High School District 30.
