= Battle of Prairie du Chien =

- Part of the War of 1812
Date	July 17–20, 1814
Location	Prairie du Chien, Illinois Territory, United States 43°02′40″N 91°08′50″W
Result	British-Indigenous victory

Belligerents
Indigenous: Menominee; Ho-Chunk; Meskwaki; United Kingdom	United States

Commanders and leaders
William McKay	Joseph Perkins

Strength
c. 650 (77 Canadian militia)	61 Army regulars 140 volunteers

Casualties and losses
3 wounded	7 wounded prisoners 53 captured

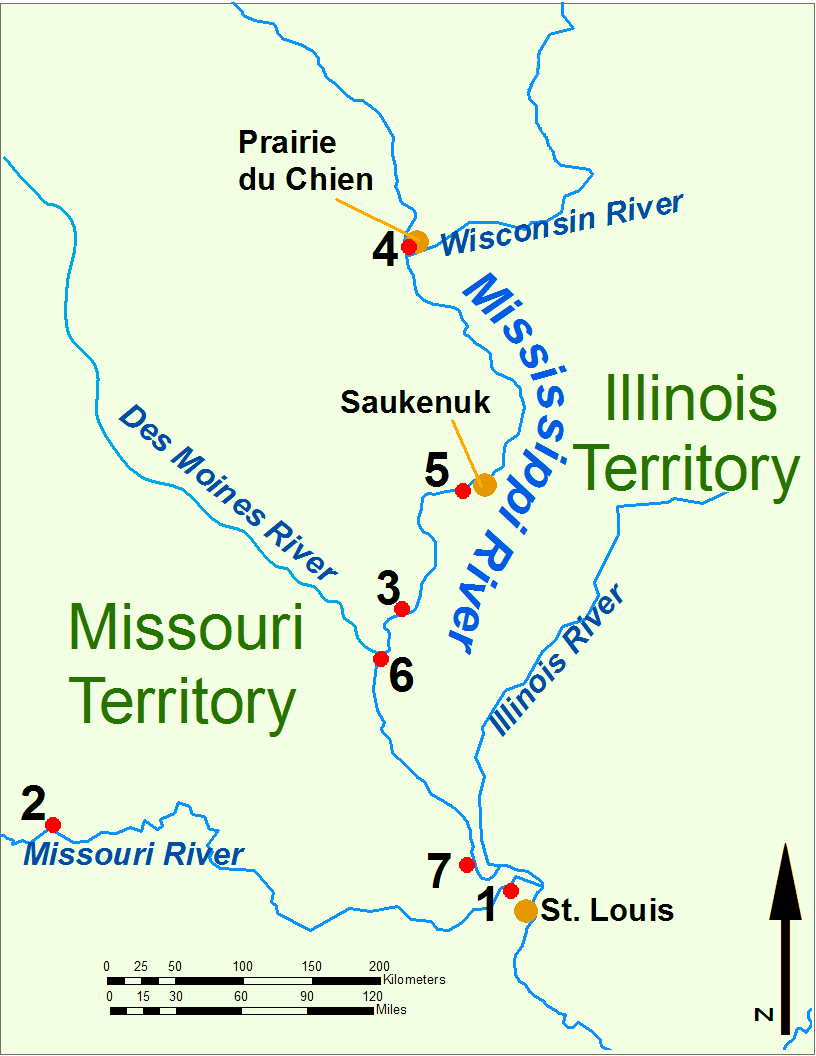
The Upper Mississippi River during the War of 1812. 1: Fort Belle Fontaine, the U.S. headquarters; 2: Fort Osage, abandoned 1813; 3: Fort Madison, defeated 1813; 4: Fort Shelby, defeated 1814; 5: Battle of Credit Island, September 1814; 6: Fort Johnson, abandoned 1814; 7: Fort Cap au Gris and the Battle of the Sink Hole, May 1815.

The Battle of Prairie du Chien (Note: Sometimes referred to as the Siege of Prairie du Chien.) was a British victory in the far western theater of the War of 1812. During the war, Prairie du Chien was a small frontier settlement with residents loyal to both American and British causes. By 1814, both nations were anxious to control the site because of its importance to the fur trade and its strategic location at the intersection of the Mississippi River and the Fox-Wisconsin Waterway, a transportation route linking the Mississippi with the Great Lakes.

== Background ==
=== American moves ===
Although Prairie du Chien became a part of the United States following the Treaty of Paris in 1783, the Americans made little effort to maintain a presence in the far western settlement. Thus, it remained largely under British influence into the 19th century. In the spring of 1814, American forces decided to secure the location, realizing that if it fell to the British, there would be no obstacle to a British attack on St. Louis. William Clark, the governor of Missouri Territory, organized a force in St. Louis that included 61 regulars from the 7th Infantry under Brevet Major Zachary Taylor and 140 volunteers who agreed to join the force for sixty days under the command of Frederick Yeizer and John Sullivan. Shortly after the force was assembled, Taylor left for personal reasons. In his place, Lieutenant Joseph Perkins of the 24th Infantry took command of the regulars. On May 1, Governor Clark and the combined forces under Perkins, Yeizer and Sullivan began moving up the Mississippi River en route to Prairie du Chien. On May 17, they scattered some Sauk warriors who attempted to bar their passage at the Rock Island rapids.

The American force arrived in Prairie du Chien on June 2. A few days later, on June 6, they began building a fort on a large mound north of the main village. The fort was named Fort Shelby in honor of Governor Isaac Shelby of Kentucky. Seeing that construction of the small wooden fort was underway, Governor Clark left to return to St. Louis on June 7. The Americans made steady progress on the fort, and although the defenses were unfinished, the barracks were occupied by June 19. Around the time that the fort was being occupied, the sixty-day terms of service for the volunteers led by Yeizer and Sullivan expired. Most of these men went home with Sullivan, although Yeizer and some men in his company agreed to stay aboard the American river gunboat Governor Clark, a thirty-two oar, fourteen gun wooden vessel anchored in the Mississippi River beside Fort Shelby.

Upon their arrival at Prairie du Chien, the American force captured some Winnebago. According to the Winnebago chief Tete de Chien, the Americans gave these prisoners food, then shot them while they were eating. Tete de Chien also said that Clark had another four Indians, including Tete de Chien's brother and the wife of a Sioux chief, imprisoned and shot after inviting them to meet with him. Clark later wrote that several Winnebago men had been shot while trying to escape. The historian Gillum Ferguson says that "Exactly what happened is impossible to determine". However, this incident encouraged the Indians of the region to support the British and oppose the Americans.

=== British moves ===
Word of the American advance reached the British at Fort Mackinac on Mackinac Island, Michigan on June 21. Lieutenant Colonel Robert McDouall, commanding the post, did not want the Americans to gain a foothold in the northwest, fearing that it would disrupt the British fur trade as well as Britain's numerous alliances with the region's Indigenous tribes. To respond to the American threat, he dispatched a force consisting of the Mississippi Volunteers (a militia unit numbering 63 men led by Captains Joseph Rolette, Thomas G. Anderson, and Pierre Grignon), 14 men of the Michigan Fencibles (a locally-raised regular unit) and several hundred Menominee, Ho-Chunk and Meskwaki warriors. Perhaps the most important part of the force was a brass 3-pounder gun, under the charge of Sergeant James Keating of the Royal Artillery. Captain William McKay of the Michigan Fencibles was made a local Lieutenant Colonel and put in command of the force. Having collected additional militia volunteers and Indigenous en route, McKay's force eventually numbered about 650 men.

== Battle ==
On July 17, the British force arrived at Prairie du Chien. Late in the morning, Thomas Anderson approached Fort Shelby to deliver Perkins a note demanding the Americans' unconditional surrender. Perkins refused and prepared to defend the fort. The battle began early in the afternoon when the British 3-pounder gun opened fire. The gun damaged the Governor Clark and compelled it to retreat downriver. The boat carried the Americans' cannon and a substantial supply of goods and ammunition, as well as the volunteers still under the command of Frederick Yeizer.

With the gunboat gone, the British concentrated their fire on Fort Shelby, but the British cannon proved less effective. The Americans and the British maintained a steady exchange of gunfire throughout the next day, but to no avail for either side. However, by the third day of battle the Americans inside Fort Shelby were beginning to run short of ammunition and other supplies. More pressing, the well inside the fort had run dry, and an attempt to deepen it led to its total collapse. Meanwhile, upset at the lack of progress, Colonel McKay began making plans to break the stalemate by firing red hot cannonballs into the fort to set it ablaze. Lieutenant Perkins offered to surrender if the British would guarantee his men's safety. McKay agreed but asked that Perkins delay formal surrender until the next day so that he could ensure that the Indian forces accompanying the British would not threaten the Americans.

On July 20, the Americans officially surrendered and vacated the fort. Under the terms of the surrender, the British were given control of the fort and the Americans' arms, ammunition, and provisions, while the American troops were allowed to return to St. Louis. 60 Americans of the 7th Infantry were captured, 7 of them wounded, while the British force had 3 Indigenous warriors wounded.

Perkins had been able to send messages asking for help to St. Louis. Major John Campbell had hastily led 120 assorted regulars and rangers up the river in six boats, but was ambushed by several hundred Sauk, Meskwaki and Kickapoo at the Rock Island Rapids on 22 July. He was able to fight his way clear when the Governor Clark unexpectedly arrived. Campbell's force had suffered 35 casualties.

== Aftermath ==
The British force took possession of Fort Shelby, which was renamed Fort McKay. Meanwhile, the Americans had returned to St. Louis by August 6. In September, the United States sent a second force upriver towards Prairie du Chien to recapture the fort, but it was turned back at the Battle of Credit Island. Despite suffering shortage of rations during the winter, the British (now commanded by Captain Andrew Bulger) maintained a presence at Fort McKay until word of the Treaty of Ghent reached Prairie du Chien in the spring of 1815. The treaty returned Prairie du Chien to the United States, so the British force abandoned the fort on May 25, burning it in their retreat. In the following year, the United States constructed Fort Crawford over the site of the battle in order to gain tighter control over the land.

Two active infantry battalions of the Regular Army (1-1 Inf and 2-1 Inf) perpetuate the lineages of detachments of the old 7th Infantry that were at the Battle of Prairie du Chien.
