= Bellefontaine =

Bellefontaine or "belle fontaine" is French for "beautiful fountain".

== Populated places ==
=== France ===
- Bellefontaine, Jura, in the department of Jura
- Bellefontaine, Manche, in the department of Manche
- Bellefontaine, Martinique, in the overseas department of Martinique
- Bellefontaine, Val-d'Oise, in the department of Val-d'Oise
- Bellefontaine, Vosges, in the department of Vosges

=== United States ===
- Bellefontaine/Governor Markham, Pasadena, California, a historic neighborhood in West Pasadena, California
- Belle Fontaine, Baldwin County, Alabama, an unincorporated community
- Belle Fontaine, Mobile County, Alabama, an unincorporated community
- Bellefontaine, Mississippi, an unincorporated community
- Bellefontaine, Missouri, an unincorporated community
- Bellefontaine, Ohio, a city

=== Elsewhere ===
- Belle Fontaine, Haiti
- Bellefontaine, Wallonia, in Bièvre, Belgium
- Bellefontaine, Wallonia, in Tintigny, Belgium

== Forts ==
- Fort Belle Fontaine, a historic site in Missouri, United States
- Fort Belle Fontaine County Park, in St. Louis, Missouri

== Other ==
- Bellefontaine Cemetery, in St. Louis, Missouri
- Bellefontaine Mansion, a historic mansion in Lenox, Massachusetts; see Canyon Ranch
- Bellefontaine, a metro station in Toulouse

== See also ==
- Bellfountain (disambiguation)
