= Linsey-woolsey =

Coarse woven fabric of linen and wool

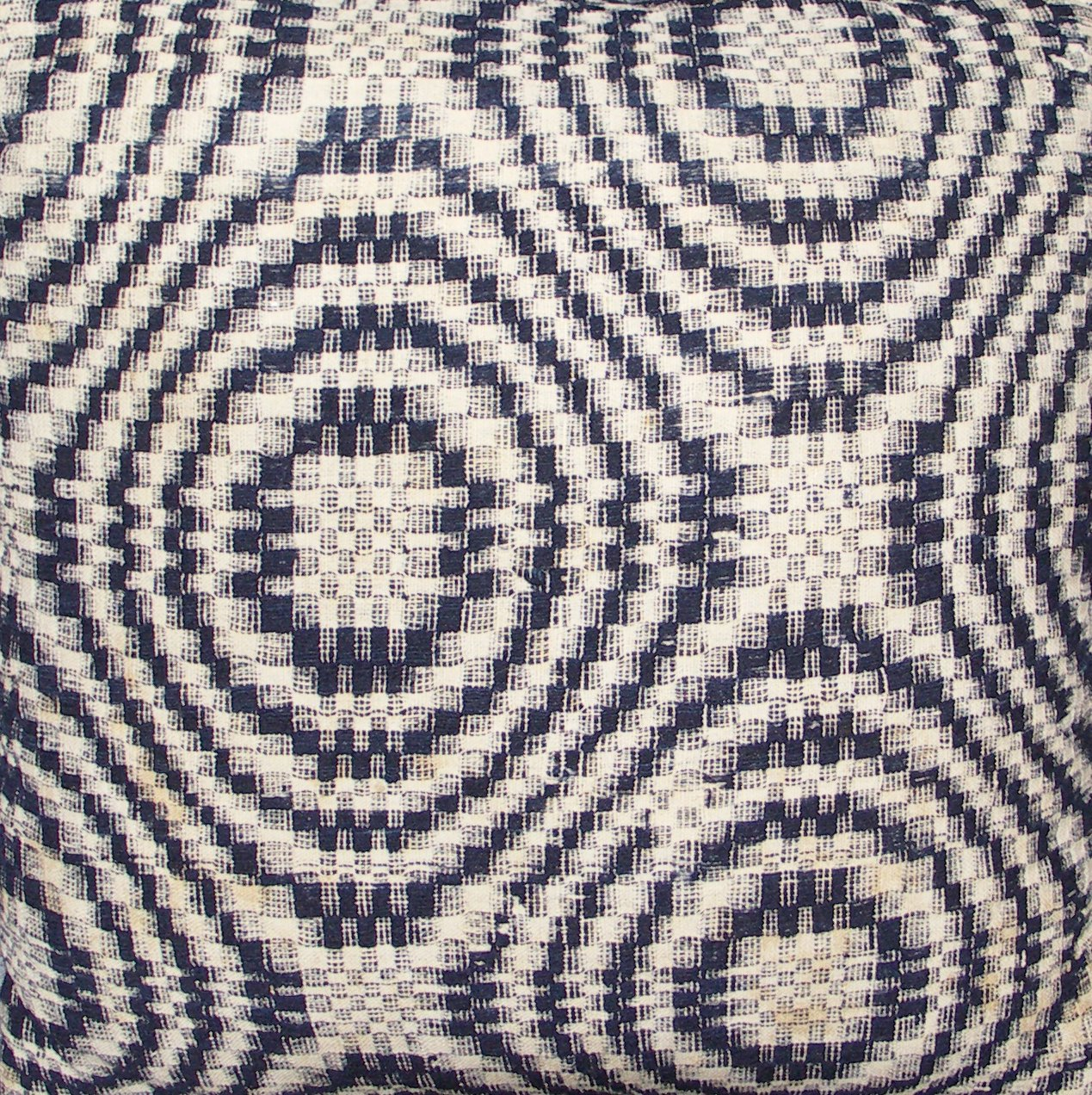
Colonial American linsey-woolsey

Linsey-woolsey (less often, woolsey-linsey or in Scots, wincey) is a coarse twill or plain-woven fabric woven with a linen warp and a woollen weft. Similar fabrics woven with a cotton warp and woollen weft in Colonial America were also called linsey-woolsey or wincey. The name derives from a combination of lin (an archaic word for flax, whence "linen") and wool. This textile has been known since ancient times. Known as shatnez (שַׁעַטְנֵז) in Hebrew, the wearing of this fabric was forbidden in the Torah and hence Jewish law.

== History ==
Mentions of a linsey-woolsey appear in late medieval sources in the Netherlands, as well as in other north-western European areas in the proceeding couple hundred years. In French, it went by "tiretaine", Danish "thirumtej", and by other names in other languages. These names were anglicised as "turtein" or "tartan" (not to be confused with tartan patterns). Hemp would also have been used together with the linen in warp yarns at this time.

The coarse fabric called stuff woven at Kidderminster from the 17th century, originally a wool fabric, may have been of linsey-woolsey construction later on. Linsey-woolsey was an important fabric in the Colonial America due to the relative scarcity of wool in the colonies. Many sources say it was used for whole-cloth quilts, and when parts of the quilt wore out the remains would be cut up and pieced into patchwork quilts. Some sources dispute this and say that the material was too rough and would have been used instead for clothing and occasionally for light blankets. It was also used as a ground fabric for needlepoint.

Linsey-woolsey was valued for its warmth, durability, and cheapness, but not for its looks.

Linsey-woolsey is also sometimes used to refer to 18th century woven coverlets or bed coverings made with a linen warp and woollen weft. The term is sometimes incorrectly applied to glazed textiles.

Linsey-woolsey continues to be woven today in small quantities for historical recreation and Colonial period decorating uses.

"Linsey-woolsey" was also used as an expression in Early Modern English to mean "nonsense" or "gibberish", i.e. some sort of verbal mishmash; cf. Shakespeare: "But what linsey-woolsey hast thou to speak to us again?" (All's well that ends well, IV:1)

== See also ==
- Stuff (cloth)
- Calamanco
- Linen
- Weaving
- Woollen
- Shatnez
