= House at 2212 W. River Drive =

Historic house in Iowa, United States

- U.S. National Register of Historic Places
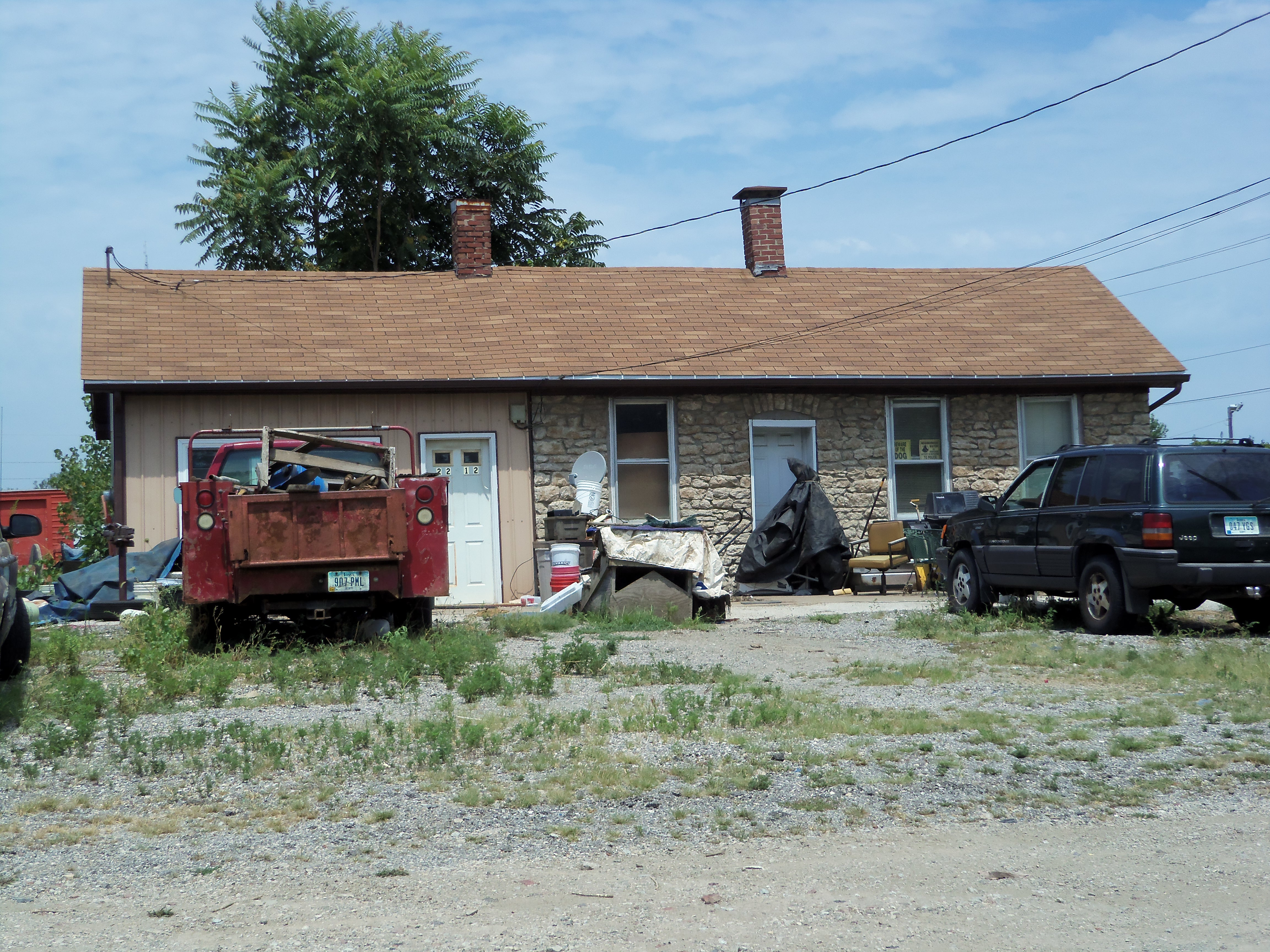

- Location within Iowa Location within the United States
- Location: 2212 W. River Dr. Davenport, Iowa
- Coordinates: 41°30′34″N 90°36′26″W
- Area: about 1 acre (0.40 ha)
- Built: 1855
- MPS: Davenport MRA
- NRHP reference No.: 84000309
- Added to NRHP: November 1, 1984

The House at 2212 W. River Drive is a historic building located in the West End of Davenport, Iowa, United States. This small house is one of the few buildings from the city's earliest decades to remain in existence. The original portion of the house on the east side is constructed of local limestone, which was available in abundance in the years before industrialization made other building materials available. It was built in the vernicle style, which was popular in Davenport until the years immediately prior to the Civil War. The area where the house is located was west of the city limits when it was built. It became a popular recreation area with the development of Suburban Island, now known as Credit Island, which is immediately to the south. The residence has been listed on the National Register of Historic Places since 1984.

== See also ==
- National Register of Historic Places in west Davenport, Iowa
