= United States Government Fur Trade Factory System =

The United States Government Fur Trade Factory System was a system of government non-profit trading with Native Americans that existed between 1795 and 1822.

The factory system was set up on the initiative of George Washington who thought it would neutralize the influence of British traders doing business on United States territory. As an honest alternative to private trade it would also further the prestige of the United States among Native Americans. Thomas Jefferson shared Washington's expectations, but was also hoping that leading men of the Indian Nations would go into debt and be forced to cede land to pay it off.

Private interests generally criticized the factory system. American Fur Company was hurt by competition from the government's trading houses and began a campaign to have them closed down. In 1821, Senator Benton of Missouri, who stood in a close relationship with that company's owner, John Jacob Astor, started hearings with the aim to abolish the factory system and open the fur trade for uninhibited private enterprise and profit-making. Among the system's defenders were the future Vice President Richard Mentor Johnson and the future President Martin Van Buren. Nevertheless, Congress abolished the government fur trade factories in 1821, giving the government one year to liquidate the system.

== Background ==
The United States had inherited the concept of government regulation of Indian trade from Britain. Continental Congress outlawed unlicensed trade with the Indian Nations in 1776 and the Confederation Congress added stricter regulations in 1786. Indian agents were only to issue licenses to citizens whose moral characters were vouched for by the appropriate governors. The licenses were issued for one year periods only and cost $500 per period. A bond of $5,000 had to be given to ensure compliance with alcohol and firearms rules. Subsequent Nonintercourse Acts of 1790, 1793, 1796 and 1802 modified these laws. Licence fees were eliminated, lighter penalties were introduced for non-observance of regulations and the moral character clause was removed.

The Jay Treaty of 1794 gave British subjects the right to acquire licenses for trading on United States territory. The Treaty of Ghent 1815 did not renew the right of the British to follow the trade across the international border and the guaranteed access to the Mississippi River that was granted them in the Jay Treaty. Through the lobbying of John Jacob Astor, Congress in 1816 outright banned foreigners from the fur trade other than in a subordinate capacity.

== Legislative history ==
In his 1793 State of the Union address, president George Washington suggested that a scheme of trading without profit with the Indian Nations would gain their friendship and fealty. The president repeated his idea in the next annual message to Congress and in 1795 a bill was passed for a limited test of the plan in the form of a $50,000 appropriation for trade goods to be sold at locations decided by the president. The following year a definite system was established by law. The president was to appoint factors residing at government trading posts and selling goods in the Indian country. They were prohibited from trading on their own behalf and had to give account of all money, goods and furs received and sold. An additional funding of $150,000 gave a total capital of $200,000 to the factory system. The trade goods were to be sold at prices that maintained the principal sum but gave no profit. An annual amount of $8,000 was allotted for maintenance of the physical assets. The law was limited to two years plus the duration of Congress.

When the law of 1796 expired on March 4, 1799, the factories continued in operation anyway. In 1802, President Jefferson pointed out that the enabling act had become invalid and Congress subsequently renewed it until March 4, 1803. In 1803, the law was extended for another two years plus the duration of Congress. In 1805 the act again expired, regardless of which Congress appropriated an additional $100,000 for setting up several new fur trade posts. The law was again renewed in 1806, now also authorizing the President to establish factories on both side of the Mississippi River. The capital was set to $260,000 and an annual allocation of $13,000 for staffing was given. In 1809, the capital was increased to $300,000 with further appropriations for clerks and factors. In 1811, a year before the formal expiration of the 1809 act, the law was renewed. Renewals of the act then took place in 1815, 1817, 1818, 1819, 1820 and 1821.

== Objectives ==
Washington recommended the factory system to Congress because he believed it would undercut the influence of British traders in the Indian country. As it would protect Native Americans from fraud and deceit it would enhance the prestige of the United States among them. The Department of the Treasury optimistically reported in 1800 that the Indian Nations were pleased with the government trading houses because through them they were sure to find a buyer for their furs as well as a fair treatment. Sale of alcohol was prevented and the business of the North West Company, the largest Montreal trading firm, was cut short.

In a message to Congress in 1802, Jefferson claimed that the government factories undersold private and foreign interest, driving them away and thereby ridding the Indian country of a class of men that undermined the United States in the eyes of the Native Americans. Recommending an expansion of the factory system, he portrayed it as a means of making the Native Americans adopt a sedentary lifestyle. Once settled as agriculturalists they would be willing to sell surplus land not needed for hunting. On several occasions, Jefferson wrote to various officials that the job of the trading posts was to encourage indebtedness beyond the leading men's personal ability to pay thereby goading them into surrender land to get rid of the debt. Several treaties ceding land to the United States also clearly state that the Indian Nations were selling in order to get rid of debts run up at a federal factory.

== Organization ==
Office of Indian Trade
Agency overview
- Formed: 1806
- Dissolved: 1821
- Type: Government procurement and distribution agency
- Jurisdiction: United States Government
- Headquarters: Georgetown, Washington D.C.
- Agency executives: John Shee, 1806; John Mason, 1806-1816; Thomas L. McKenney, 1816-1821
- Parent department: United States Department of the Treasury 1806-1811; United States Department of War 1811-1821

At the very beginning, the Purveyor of Public Supplies was in charge of buying the merchandise to be sold at the government factories and also for selling the furs and other items received in trade. Military agents of the War Department usually handled transportation of the goods. In 1796, John Harris, the Keeper of Military Stores in Philadelphia, took over the reception and selling of goods obtained in trade. The Purveyor of Public Supplies continued to buy merchandise for the factories. In 1801, William Irvine, Superintendent of Military Stores, was appointed Agent for the fur trading factories in addition to the office he already held. He was to receive and sell goods received and give the Secretary of War estimates of merchandise needed by the factories. When he died in 1804, George Ingels, Military Storekeeper at Philadelphia was appointed Acting Superintendent of Military Stores and Acting Agent for the Indian Factories. In 1805, William Davy was appointed Principal Agent for Indian Factories. He was to handle both the purchase of merchandise for the factories and the disposal of goods received from them, thereby also assuming the job previously done by the Purveyor of Public Supplies.

In 1806, John Shee was appointed Superintendent of Indian Trade, in charge of both the purchase of merchandise for the factories and the disposal of goods received from them. At first his office was called "Office of the Superintendent of Indian Trade" but from 1808 "Office of Indian Trade" or "Indian Trade Office". The office was first established in Philadelphia, but was required by law to move to the District of Columbia. Shee were not willing to move with it and John Mason was appointed Superintendent and the Office was moved to Georgetown. In 1816, Mason was replaced by Thomas L. McKenney. The Office of Superintendent of Indian Trade was under the supervision of the Secretary of the Treasury until 1811 when it was moved from the Treasury to the War Department.

Factors were in immediate charge of the several factories. They received merchandise which they traded in exchange for Native American goods, mostly furs and skins. Other employees of the factory system, many on a part-time-basis, handled purchasing and transportation in Philadelphia, New York, New Orleans, Savannah, Albany and St. Louis. The furs received in trade at the factories were from 1806 to 1809 sold at public auction. This ended because the market became oversupplied and the prices low.

== Operations ==
President Washington insisted that government trade with the Indian Nations be free of fraud and extortion, supply merchandise plentifully and without delay and provide a market for Native American goods at fair and stable prices. The merchandise was limited to products of the domestic market and hence not always of the highest quality. They were often inferior to products imported from England by private merchants. The Embargo Act of 1807 and the Non-Intercourse Act of 1809 made it more difficult for private traders to acquire foreign goods. British traders avoided that problem as their import from England went to Montreal and from there to Pittsburgh, down the Ohio and up the Mississippi.

The merchandise included blankets, strouds, siamoise cotton, mammoodies cotton, calamanco, Bocking bay, pullicats, rumals, shalloons, guns, gunpowder, lead, axes, knives, gorgets, kettles, tin cups, cowbells, maul rings, hoes, frying pans, arm bands, shirts, earbobs, silk stock, tinsel hatbands, Jew's harps, side-saddles, wampum, trinkets, coffee, and food items. Transportation of merchandise to the factories was a costly, laborious and many times inefficient procedure, often requiring several transshipments. Merchandise bought at Philadelphia, and later Georgetown, was received by forwarding agents in New Orleans, St. Louis or Detroit who distributed them to the factories by boats, wagons or pack horses.

The merchandise was primarily sold at the factories, but the factors also sent out traders to reach Native Americans who lived far away. In trade, the factories received furs, skins, beeswax, tallow, bear oil, feathers and other products. Soldiers, private traders, travelers and others paid in cash. The trade goods were shipped to New Orleans, St. Louis and Detroit. Some items were sold there, but most of it was shipped to Philadelphia and later Georgetown. Merchandise was sold at a 68% markup over market costs. Non-Native Americans were charged 10% more. Business at the factories reflected the general economic situation in the country. After the War of 1812 there was a steady rise in the volume of business until the Panic of 1819. The factory at Green Bay, Wisconsin showed a decline in business already in 1818, as a result of the establishment of the American Fur Company in the area.

== Criticism and support ==
The factory system was routinely denounced by its rivals in the private sector. It happened that private traders told Native Americans that the goods sold at the factories were intended to be gifts from the government, but that the factors sold them for their own personal gain. The frontier press regularly censured the factory system and prominent businessmen added their political influence to its detractors. The American Fur Company was hurt by competition from the government trading houses and began a campaign to have them closed down. In 1815, Governor Edwards of the Illinois Territory presented criticism that originated with the fur trader Auguste Chouteau of St. Louis. The gist of it was that the factor's lack of profit interest made them lax businessmen. In addition, the federal appointees were ignorant of Native American ways and languages.

Supporters of the government's involvement in the fur trade were usually found among philanthropists, government officials and among most of the factors themselves. Its existence was upheld by several Congress committees and of Congress itself. The Superintendent of Indian Trade, Thomas McKenney, was the most vigorous defender of the factory system. He regarded private traders as the root of most evil in the Indian country and wanted the factory system to be a means for "civilizing" Native Americans. George C. Sibley, a vehement critic of fur traders and fur trading companies agreed with the Superintendent in his assessment of the negative effects of the private fur trade.

Madison's administration did not share the trust in private business expressed by many critics of the factory system. In 1816, Secretary of the Treasury, William H. Crawford proposed more stringent regulations for private fur traders. Nor did the Monroe administration trust the unselfishness of private interests. Secretary of War, John C. Calhoun urged stricter licence requirements for private fur traders in 1818. According to him, aliens and other dishonest fortune hunters were debauching the Native Americans through illegal whiskey.

== Abolishment ==
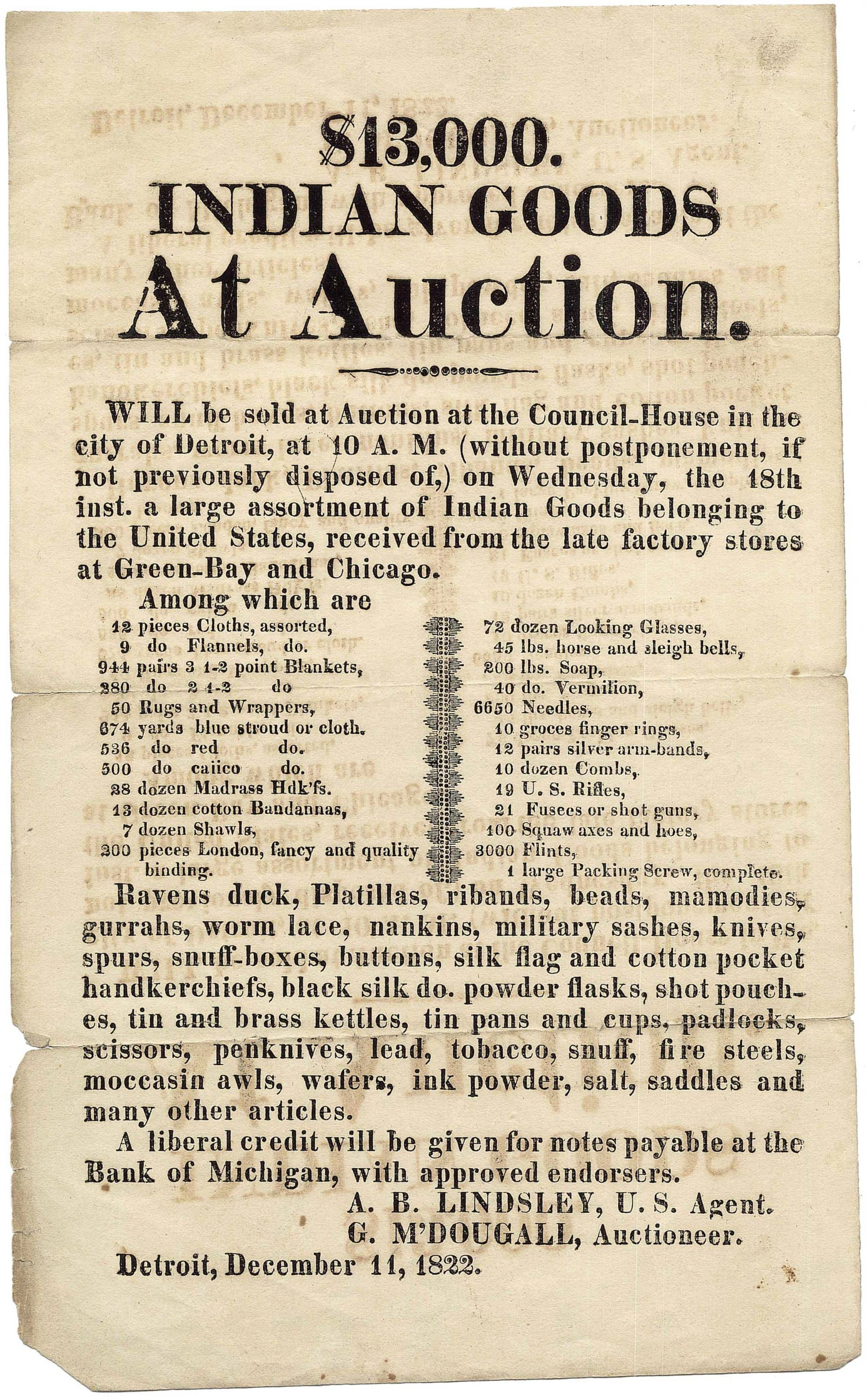
Broadside advertising the sale at auction of merchandise remaining from the government factories at Chicago and Green Bay.

In 1821, Thomas Hart Benton of Missouri, chairman of the Committee on Indian Affairs, started hearings with the aim to abolish the factory system and open the fur trade for uninhibited private enterprise. Benton claimed that as a citizen of a frontier state he had a better understanding than most of the systems supporters of how it worked. However, other motives can also be found. Among his constituents were several powerful fur traders. Benton was on a retainer from the American Fur Company as their lawyer and acted as John Jacob Astor's spokesperson in the Senate, while that role in the House was filled by John Floyd of Virginia. At this point in time he was also in considerable pecuniary difficulties due to a bank failure in Missouri.

Benton argued that the factory system had been established to contest the influence of the British fur traders that made business on United States territory under the Jay Treaty. But now, when that treaty was superseded and the law kept alien fur traders away there was nothing that motivated government factories. Instead, the system proved the inherent unfitness of the federal government to conduct commercial business. It was full of undetected abuse. Trade goods provided by the government did not meet the needs of its Native American customers. The merchandise was purchased at excessive costs at inconvenient locations from eastern businessmen, when suitable articles could have been found at lower prices in Pittsburgh or St. Louis thereby also saving on transportation costs. The sale of furs at Georgetown meant that the government received lower prices than if they had been sold in St Louis. The matter was referred to the Indian Affairs Committee which heard testimony from interested parties, fur traders, Indian agents, factors and the Superintendent of Indian Trade.

Some of the witnesses that faulted the factory system and its employees were individual traders and Indian agents that were eager to remove competition, while others were employees of John Jacob Astor. Ramsay Crooks was the general manager of the American Fur Company, while Indian Agent Benjamin O'Fallon had been appointed on the recommendation of Astor. Antagonism existed between Indian agents and the Office of Indian Trade, while the agents were in tender harmony with the fur traders they licensed. The newly appointed Indian Agent John Biddle affirmed "the uselessness" of the factory system.

Superintendent McKenney argued for the factory system while admitting some of the claims made by Benton. Congress required his office to procure trade goods on the home market, thereby putting a severe handicap on the factory system. Much merchandise had been bought during or just after the War of 1812, when the prices were two-fold or threefold the current. The prices charged Native Americans were not outrageous when considering freight and haulage. McKenney claimed that intrigues of the American Fur Company harmed the official trade to the extent that the posts at Chicago and Green Bay was about to be closed down. Indian Agents were intimidated by threats of removal through the political influence of Mr. Astor. As proof of this, he claimed that John Kinzie, an agent of the American Fur Company, had been found selling alcohol to Native Americans in Milwaukee, but no actions against him had been taken.

Finally, the Committee on Indian Affairs reported a bill abolishing the factory system. In the debate in the Senate, the existing system was defended by Henry Johnson, Richard Mentor Johnson, Martin Van Buren and Walter Lowrie. But the bill became law on March 31, 1821. A year was allowed to liquidate the operations. Benton managed to pass a supplementary bill that prevented the current officeholders from taking part in the closing down process. George Gorham was subsequently placed in charge of the liquidation of the Office of Indian Trade and the government factories. It was not fully completed until 1830.

== List of factories ==
Government factories were usually situated at military posts. The army aided the factories by ordering soldiers to assist with transporting goods, beating and packing furs and erecting buildings. The Army protected the factories from violence and theft. The military presence enhanced the prestige of the factories in the eyes of the Native Americans.

- Colerain was established 1795 on St. Mary's River, Georgia. It was subsequently moved to Fort Wilkinson in 1797, to Ocmulgee Old Fields 1806, to Fort Hawkins 1808, and to Fort Mitchell 1817 before being closed down in 1821.
- Tellico, in what is now eastern Tennessee, was established in 1795. In 1807 it was moved a few miles south to Hiawassee before being discontinued in 1811.
- The factory at Fort Wayne was established in 1802. It was burned by the local Native Americans at the beginning of the War of 1812.
- Detroit was established in 1802 and closed down in 1805.
- Chickasaw Bluffs was established in 1802 and removed to Spadra Bluffs in Arkansas in 1818.
- St. Stephens on the Tombigbee River was established in 1802 and removed to Fort Confederation in 1817.
- Chicago in 1805, lost 1812 at the beginning of the war. Reestabblished in 1815.
- Belle Fontaine on the Missouri River in 1805, abandoned in 1808.
- Natchitoches in 1805, removed to Sulphur Fork Factory, Arkansas on the Red River in 1818.
- Arkansas Post opened in 1805 and closed in 1810.
- Sandusky, Ohio in 1806, lost 1812 at the beginning of the war.
- Fort Madison, Iowa was established in 1808, but burned down in 1812 by order of the military commander who feared that it would endanger the military post.
- Mackinac was established in 1808, and taken by the British in 1812.
- Fort Osage in 1808 and removed in 1813 to Arrow Rock.
- Green Bay opened in 1815.
- Fort Edwards, Illinois in 1818, removed to Fort Armstrong in 1822.
- Prairie du Chien opened in 1815.

== See also ==
- Great Plains First Nations trading networks
