= Campbell's Island State Memorial =

Coordinates: 41.5384°N 90.4366°W

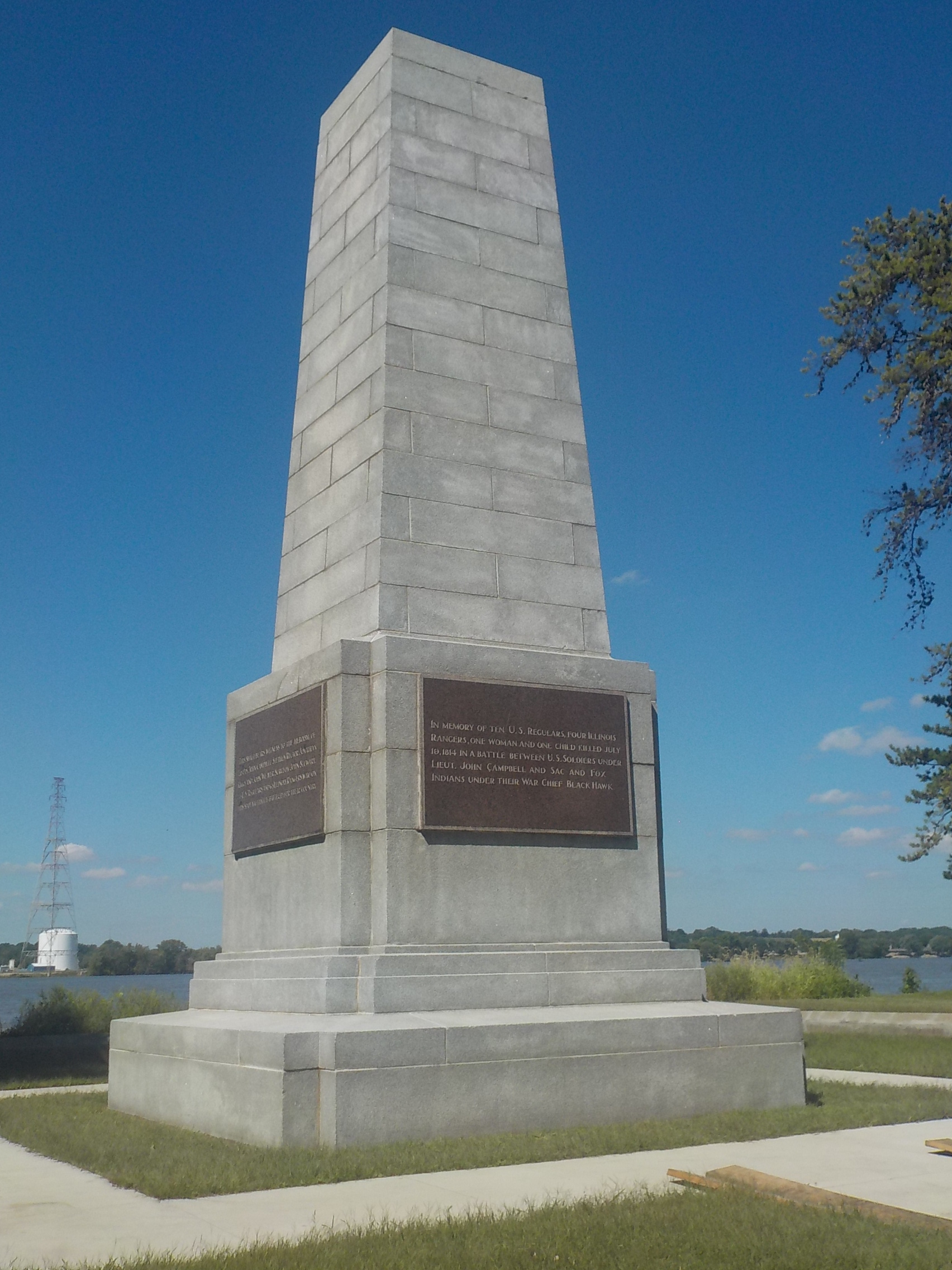
- Campbell's Island State Memorial, 2018
- Location: 124 Island Ave, East Moline, Illinois 61244
- Designer: Albert Louis Van der Berghen
- Material: Granite
- Height: 35 feet (11 m)
- Dedicated date: 1908
- Dedicated to: Battle of Rock Island Rapids
- Website: Official website

Campbell's Island State Memorial is a granite monument that marks the site of a day-long battle on July 19, 1814 during the War of 1812 on Campbell's Island, Illinois. Dedicated in 1908, the monument is maintained by the Illinois Historic Preservation Agency as a national historic site.

The monument was restored in 2018. The rededication ceremony was postponed for two years due to flooding, and took place in September 2020.
