= Fort Johnson (19th century) =

Coordinates: 40.355173°N 91.432928°W

Fort Johnson was a U.S. Army post built on bluffs overlooking the Mississippi River in modern-day Warsaw, Illinois, during the War of 1812. The fort was established in September 1814 by Major Zachary Taylor, future 12th President of the United States (1849–1850). Troops retreating from the Battle of Credit Island constructed the fort after effectively surrendering control of the upper Mississippi to the British and allied Indian tribes, including the Sauk. The fort, which held a full company of men, was completed in just a few weeks, and had a commanding view of the Mississippi valley, the mouth of the Des Moines River, and the foot of the Des Moines Rapids. Because of the chaotic situation along the Mississippi River frontier, the fort was abandoned in late October 1814 after provisions ran out. The company retreated to Cap au Gris near St. Louis.

Black Hawk described the founding of the fort and a skirmish in his autobiography:

A party of braves followed to watch where they landed, but they did not stop until they got below the Des Moines Rapids, where they came ashore and commenced building a fort. I did not want a fort in our country, as we wished to go down to the Two River country in the fall and hunt, it being our choice hunting ground, and we concluded that if this fort was built, it would prevent us from going there. We arrived in the vicinity in the evening, and encamped on a high bluff for the night. We made no fire, for fear of being observed, and our young men kept watch by turns while others slept. I was very tired, and was soon asleep. The Great Spirit, during my slumber, told me to go down the bluff to a creek, that I would there find a hollow tree cut down, and by looking in at the top of it, I would see a large snake with head erect—to observe the direction he was looking, and I would see the enemy close by and unarmed. In the morning I communicated to my braves what the Great Spirit had said to me, took one of them and went down a ravine that led to the creek. I soon came in sight of the place where they were building the fort, which was on a hill at the opposite side of the creek. I saw a great many men. We crawled cautiously on our hands and knees until we got to the bottom land, then through the grass and weeds until we reached the bank of the creek. Here I found a tree that had been cut down; I looked in at the top of it and saw a large snake, with his head raised, looking across the creek. I raised myself cautiously, and discovered nearly opposite to me, two war chiefs walking arm in arm, without guns. They turned and walked back toward the place where the men were working at the fort. In a little while they returned, walking directly towards the spot where we lay concealed, but did not come so near as before. If they had they would have been killed, for each of us had a good rifle. We crossed the creek and crawled to a cluster of bushes. I again raised myself a little to see if they were coming; but they went into the fort, and by this they saved their lives.

We recrossed the creek and I returned alone, going up the same ravine I came down. My brave went down the creek, and I, on raising the brow of a hill to the left of the one we came down, could plainly see the men at work. I saw a sentinel walking in the bottom near the mouth of the creek. I watched him attentively, to see if he perceived my companion, who had gone toward him. The sentinel stopped for some time and looked toward where my brave was concealed. He walked first one way and then the other.

I observed my brave creeping towards him, at last he lay still for a while, not even moving the grass, and as the sentinel turned to walk away, my brave fired and he fell. I looked towards the fort, and saw the whites were in great confusion, running wildly in every direction, some down the steep bank toward a boat. My comrade joined me, we returned to the rest of the party and all hurried back to Rock River, where we arrived in safety at our village. I hung up my medicine bag, put away my rifle and spear, feeling as if I should want them no more, as I had no desire to raise other war parties against the whites unless they gave me provocation. Nothing happened worthy of note until spring, except that the fort below the rapids had been abandoned and burned by the Americans.

== Fort Edwards ==
In October 1815, the fort site was reoccupied by the Americans and rebuilt, christened Cantonment Davis. Troops stationed at Cantonment Davis helped to construct Fort Edwards, an important military and trading post occupied until 1824 by the U.S. Army and by traders until about 1832. Recent archaeological survey has determined the probable location of Fort Johnson/Cantonment Davis. A federal fur trade factory operated at the fort from 1818 until 1822 when it was removed to Fort Armstrong in 1822.
