= Sulphur Fork Factory, Arkansas =

- Fur trade factory
- Constructed: 1818
- Built for: United States Office of Indian Trade
- Location: At the confluence of Sulphur River and Red River of the South in Miller County, Arkansas
- Factors: John Fowler 1818-1820; Larkin Edwards (Acting) 1820-1821; William McClellan 1821-1822
- Closed: 1822
- Buildings abandoned: 1825

Sulphur Fork Factory was a federal fur trade post established by Chief Factor John Fowler in 1818. It was closed in 1822 when Congress abolished the government fur trade factory system.

== History ==
In 1818, the federal fur trade factory at Natchitoches, Louisiana was in a dilapidated state. In addition, the local Roman Catholic parish claimed ownership to the land. Consequently all business had been stopped and the factory was under orders to be moved to the site of Fort Selden, Louisiana. However, at Fort Selden, a local landowner, John Sibley claimed the land. The Chief Factor, Captain John Fowler, recommended a site at the confluence of the Sulphur Fork and Red Rivers just beyond the northern Louisiana boundary as a suitable place for a new trading post. He specified that he did not believe that the Great Raft on the Red River would create any transport problems for the new factory.

Construction of the new post began in May 1818 and was practically finished a year later after substantial problems with civilian and military manpower. A number of structures were now ready to be used. A main building of hewn pine logs, combining a store on the first floor and a residence for the factor on the second, measured 39 feet by 19 feet. A storehouse for furs also had two floors. There was also a cookhouse combined with laborers' quarters.

The factory traded directly with the Native Americans who visited the post and indirectly through licensed traders who bought their merchandise at the factory. The merchandise sold was flour, salt, tobacco, clothing, guns and ammunitions. In return the factory received shaved and unshaved deerskins, beaver, otter, raccoon and fox pelts, bear and cat skins, bear oil, deer tallow, beeswax, and honey.

Besides the Chief Factor John Fowler and the laborers, there were two other employees, Larkin Edwards, the clerk, and Jacob Irwin, a gunsmith who repaired the fire arms of the factory's Native American customers. When Fowler left in 1820, Edwards was put in charge until William McClellan was appointed chief factor in 1821. When pressure from the American Fur Company caused Congress to abolish the factory system, the Office of Indian trade ordered the factors to close the factories by the summer of 1822. Chief Factor McClellan, however, kept it open until fall. The liquidation o the factory system was done by the Treasury Department and McClellan remained until March 1823, when R. N. Johnston, the treasury agent, arrived. The Indian Agency under George Gray remained at the site until 1825.

The site is currently owned by the Archaeological Conservancy and cannot legally be metal detected or otherwise dug for relics.
