= Old Monroe, Missouri =

City in Lincoln County, Missouri, US

- City
- Old Monroe in 2026

- Location of Old Monroe, Missouri
- Coordinates: 38°55′55″N 90°44′53″W
- Country: United States
- State: Missouri
- County: Lincoln

Area
  - Total: 0.37 sq mi (0.95 km^{2})
  - Land: 0.36 sq mi (0.94 km^{2})
  - Water: 0.0077 sq mi (0.02 km^{2})
- Elevation: 443 ft (135 m)

Population (2020)
  - Total: 249
  - Density: 688.0/sq mi (265.62/km^{2})
- Time zone: UTC-6 (Central (CST))
  - Summer (DST): UTC-5 (CDT)
- ZIP code: 63369
- Area code: 636
- FIPS code: 29-54416
- GNIS feature ID: 2396052

Old Monroe is a city in Lincoln County, Missouri, United States. The population was 249 at the 2020 census.

== History ==
Old Monroe was the site of Fort Howard. It was laid out in 1819, and named after President James Monroe. The name was prefixed with "Old" in order to avoid postal conflict with Monroe City.

The Battle of the Sink Hole was fought on May 24, 1815, after the official end of the War of 1812, between Missouri Rangers and Sauk Indians led by Black Hawk. The Sauk were unaware, or did not care, that their British patrons had signed the Treaty of Ghent with the U.S. The battle was fought in a low spot near the mouth of the Cuivre River near the current day city of Old Monroe.

After the battle, in 1816, Black Hawk reaffirmed the Treaty of St. Louis after re-negotiation with the United States government.

The city was originally named "Monroe" and it served as the county seat from 1819 until 1823. The name would change to its current form circa 1857 when Monroe County and its county seat, Monroe City, were established. The postal office then labeled the older town as Old Monroe.

The old truss bridge in Old Monroe. It was closed off to traffic in 2015.

== Geography ==
Old Monroe is located at 38°55′55″N 90°44′53″W (38.931993, -90.748049).

According to the United States Census Bureau, the city has a total area of 0.26 square miles (0.67 km^{2}), of which 0.25 square miles (0.65 km^{2}) is land and 0.01 square miles (0.03 km^{2}) is water.

== Demographics ==
Historical population
Census	Pop.	Note	%±
1910	251		—
1920	317		26.3%
1930	271		−14.5%
1940	272		0.4%
1950	268		−1.5%
1960	290		8.2%
1970	330		13.8%
1980	272		−17.6%
1990	242		−11.0%
2000	250		3.3%
2010	265		6.0%
2020	249		−6.0%
U.S. Decennial Census

=== 2010 census ===
As of the census of 2010, there were 265 people, 102 households, and 68 families living in the city. The population density was 1,060.0 inhabitants per square mile (409.3/km^{2}). There were 113 housing units at an average density of 452.0 per square mile (174.5/km^{2}). The racial makeup of the city was 97.0% White, 0.4% African American, 0.4% Native American, 1.1% from other races, and 1.1% from two or more races. Hispanic or Latino of any race were 1.9% of the population.

There were 102 households, of which 37.3% had children under the age of 18 living with them, 46.1% were married couples living together, 13.7% had a female householder with no husband present, 6.9% had a male householder with no wife present, and 33.3% were non-families. 27.5% of all households were made up of individuals, and 7.9% had someone living alone who was 65 years of age or older. The average household size was 2.60 and the average family size was 3.13.

The median age in the city was 31.8 years. 28.3% of residents were under the age of 18; 10.9% were between the ages of 18 and 24; 29.4% were from 25 to 44; 23.1% were from 45 to 64; and 8.3% were 65 years of age or older. The gender makeup of the city was 48.7% male and 51.3% female.

=== 2000 census ===
As of the census of 2000, there were 251 people, 106 households, and 68 families living in the city. The population density was 1,654.1 inhabitants per square mile (638.7/km^{2}). There were 115 housing units at an average density of 760.9 per square mile (293.8/km^{2}). The racial makeup of the city was 98.40% White, 0.80% from other races, and 0.80% from two or more races. Hispanic or Latino of any race were 2.80% of the population.

There were 106 households, out of which 29.2% had children under the age of 18 living with them, 47.2% were married couples living together, 14.2% had a female householder with no husband present, and 35.8% were non-families. 30.2% of all households were made up of individuals, and 16.0% had someone living alone who was 65 years of age or older. The average household size was 2.36 and the average family size was 2.87.

In the city the population was spread out, with 23.6% under the age of 18, 10.8% from 18 to 24, 27.6% from 25 to 44, 20.0% from 45 to 64, and 18.0% who were 65 years of age or older. The median age was 36 years. For every 100 females, there were 92.3 males. For every 100 females age 18 and over, there were 99.0 males.

The median income for a household in the city was $31,429, and the median income for a family was $42,188. Males had a median income of $39,063 versus $21,964 for females. The per capita income for the city was $15,457. None of the families and 4.5% of the population were living below the poverty line, including no under eighteens and 5.6% of those over 64.

== Education ==
The area school district is Winfield R-IV School District.
