= Battle of Rock Island Rapids =

1814 War of 1812 battle

- Part of the War of 1812
Date	July 19, 1814
Location	Campbell Island, Illinois
Result	Sauk, Meskwaki, and Kickapoo victory

Belligerents
Sauk, Meskwaki, and Kickapoo	United States

Commanders and leaders
Chief Black Hawk	(United States) Lieutenant John Campbell (WIA) (United States) Lieutenant Stephen Rector (United States) Lieutenant Jonathan Riggs (United States) Federick Yezier

Strength
400	33 regulars of the 1st Infantry regiment 65 Illinois rangers

Casualties and losses
More than 2 killed	14 killed 21 wounded Total: 35

The Battle of Rock Island Rapids, also called the Battle of Campbell Island, was an American defeat during the War of 1812 at the hands of the British allied Sauk, Meskwaki, and Kickapoo. In July 1814, a military expedition was mounted to supply the U.S. garrison at Prairie du Chien after calls for help. The U.S. expedition was ambushed on July 19. In the aftermath another expedition was sent to re-capture Prairie after it fell to the British. This expedition was also ambushed in the Battle of Credit Island and forced to retreat southwards.

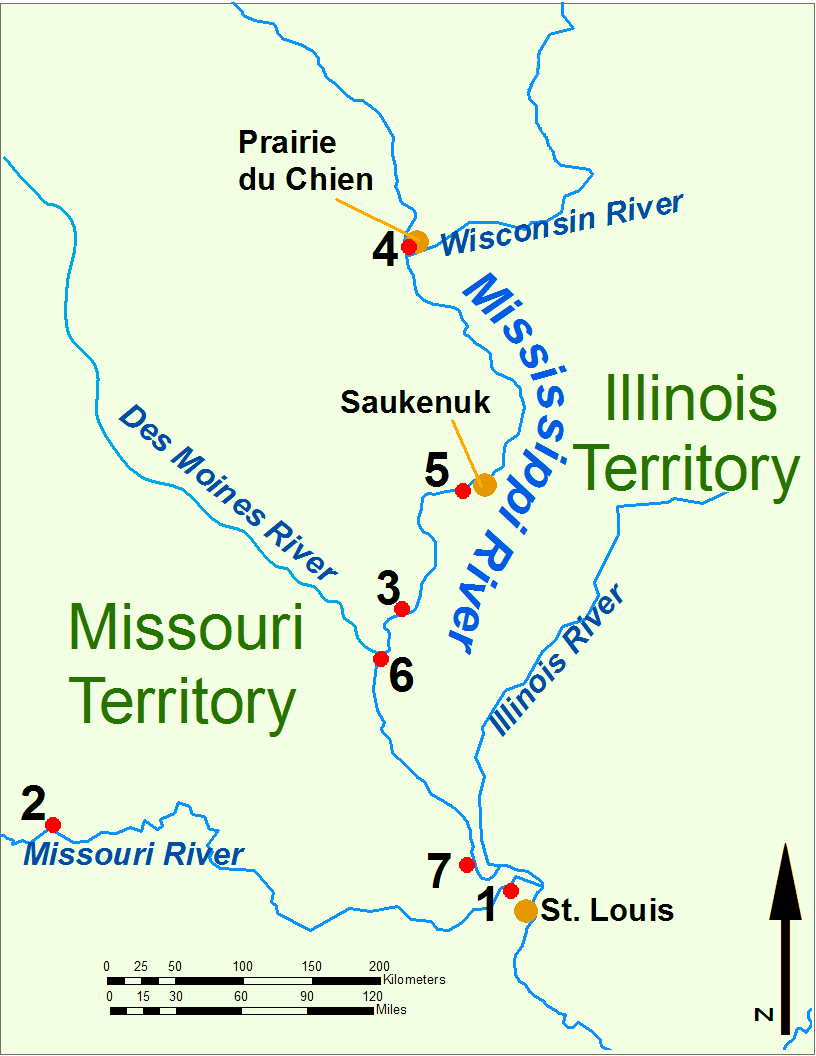
The Upper Mississippi River during the War of 1812. 1: Fort Belle Fontaine U.S. headquarters; 2: Fort Osage; 3: Fort Madison; 4: Fort Shelby; 5: Battle of Rock Island Rapids, July 1814 and the Battle of Credit Island, Sept. 1814; 6: Fort Johnson; 7: Fort Cap au Gris and the Battle of the Sink Hole, May 1815.

== Events ==
=== Background ===
In June 1814, the U.S. Army at Fort Shelby, Prairie du Chien (present-day Wisconsin), was threatened with British and Indian attack. After calls for more supplies and men reached St. Louis, Governor William Clark of Missouri organized the expedition led by Lieutenant John Campbell.

=== Expedition ===
On July 4, Campbell's expedition left Cape au Gris with three fortified barges, or keel boats, each with a cabin and all having sails. There were 33 regular soldiers and 65 rangers, some of the latter being Frenchmen from Cahokia. The regulars were from the 1st and 7th Infantry regiments together with the Illinois rangers. The expedition also included a settlers establishment, boatmen, and women and children, families of the soldiers. Making the total one hundred and thirty-three persons. Lieutenant (acting Brigade Major) John Campbell of the First Infantry commanded the first boat, occupied by the 1st Infantry, contractors, and women and children. The second boat was commanded by Lieutenant Stephen Rector and the third by Lieutenant Jonathan Riggs. The number of regulars in this expedition has been repeatedly given as forty-two; Major Campbell, however, reported that he had but thirty-three.

On July 13, about eighty miles below the mouth of Rock river, they met a party of Indians from Prairie du Chien with a packet directed to Governor Clark of Missouri. They informed Campbell that the American garrison at Prairie was still holding on.

On the eighteenth of July, about twenty miles below Rock river, the expedition was met by another party of nine Indians in canoes, bearing a white flag. They told Major Campbell that they had heard of the American's approach and had come to welcome them in peace. At the mouth of the Rock River the expedition was met by five other Indians in canoes, who informed to Campbell that the Indians at the village on Rock River, about a mile above its mouth wished to hold a council with him. The keel boats proceeded up the river and landed on the Illinois shore opposite of the lower end of Rock Island.

In a short time, about one hundred and fifty warriors, besides women and children of the Sauk and Fox nation appeared. Chief Black Hawk was at the head of the party. During the meeting, Campbell and Black Hawk discussed opening a war against the Winnebagos only if he had the means to do so. Black Hawk also ensured Campbell that the Mississippi River would remain open to U.S. travel, fear that the British and their allies would bar passage. Keeping in spirit the Indians remained very friendly for the remainder of the night, recognizing many old friends among the Frenchmen from Cahokia.

=== Forehand ===
On the morning of July 19, the expedition continued on its way to Prairie du Chien and set sail on the river pushed on by a fine breeze northwards. However, later last night, a party of Indians arrived at the Sauk village from Prairie du Chien, coming down from the Rock river. They brought the Sauks six kegs of powder and told them that the fort at Prairie du Chien had been captured by the British. These messengers told the Sauks that the British wished them to again join them in the war against the Americans which Black Hawk agreed to do.

Chief Black Hawk then collected all his warriors, determined to pursue the American keels moving up the river. The Indian force chased the boats by land hoping that they could ambush Campbell if he moved ashore. The keelboats had just passed the head of Rock island, when the boat commanded by Campbell was grounded in rocks. Campbell found himself in a boat that was loaded down and approaching hurricane-like winds. After proceeding about six miles, the wind increased into a storm with Campbell's boat overloaded. He later said:

'I was afraid of her dashing to pieces on the rocks, and ordered her to be put to shore, which in doing from the severe gale of wind which was blowing, and the roughness of the water dashed her so hard on shore it was impossible to get her off while the storm lasted."

=== Battle of Campbell island ===
The keel was driven on the northern shore of what is now Campbell's island, lying about six miles east of Moline. The ground where the keel landed was covered with high grass, hazel and willow bushes for a considerable distance up and down the shore. Campbell immediately placed two sentinels about sixty yards from the boat to keep watch. They made camp on the island for no more than twenty-five or thirty minutes when Chief Black Hawk commenced his attack. In the first minutes both sentinels were killed and one other regular on the shore. Campbell ordered the cables tethering the keel to be cut so they could seek safety offshore. Regardless of the effort, a strong gale was blowing against the shore, not allowing the boat to leave. Stranded, Campbell ordered his men to defend the keel to the "last extremity".

The keelboats of Lieutenants Rector and Riggs were about three miles up the river at this time. Lieutenant Riggs' boat being in front, had heard the firing and saw smoke rising from the island. He immediately turned around and tracked down Campbell's keel and signaled to Rector, who tracked the boat and sailed for the island. Once closer, they were dismayed to see that Indians had Campbell's boat surrounded and the storm was preventing them from getting close enough to help. Meanwhile, a large number of Indians were seen coming in large numbers in canoes from the eastern shore. Overall it was later estimated that they were surrounded by 400 Indians. The Indians poured a constant supply of musket fire and arrows on Campbell's beleaguered troops holding on to the keel. Two or three attempts at firing flaming arrows from Black Hawk's men at close range was successful in hitting the boat's sail and setting it ablaze. Major Campbell's right wrist was fractured by a musket ball during the onslaught. Pushed on by the storm the keel now became grounded deep within rocks.

After an hour, the storm had died down allowing Rector to anchor his keel 20 yards away soon followed by Riggs' who anchored his 100 yards away. By now ten of the regulars and a woman and child lay dead. A fifth of the regulars were wounded and unable to fight. Rector's men were the first to reach the scene of the battle and assist in transferring the wounded to his boat. The boat became so heavy that Rector had to throw out almost all their provisions in order to stay afloat. Major Campbell was wounded again when he was shot through the chest. Four of Rector's Illinois rangers were killed in renewed Indian fire.

The Governor Clark river gunboat commanded by Federick Yezier, damaged at Prairie from British artillery fire, had retreated downriver when it encountered Campbell's force. Arriving in perfect timing the gunboat helped in evacuating the remainder of Campbell's expedition. Once the evacuation was done, each man assisted in pushing the boat back a distance until it was offshore. Afterward, they took turns rowing night and day until they reached safety in St. Louis.

After the battle, the Indian force plundered the abandoned keel for gunpowder, paraded, and scalped five of Campbell's dead regulars left behind. Sauk casualties, according to Chief Black Hawk, were two killed. However, this figure may be higher since other Native American tribes participated including the Fox and Kickapoo.

== Aftermath ==
Battle of Credit Island
- Part of the War of 1812
Date	September 5, 1814
Location	Near Davenport, Scott County, United States
Result	Decisive British and Native victory

Belligerents
(United Kingdom of Great Britain and Ireland) United Kingdom; Sauk	United States

Commanders and leaders
(United Kingdom of Great Britain and Ireland) Lieutenant Duncan Graham; Chief Black Hawk	(United States) Zachary Taylor (United States) Captain Nelson Rector

Strength
800-1,200 Natives; 30 British regulars and volunteers 1 Grasshopper cannon 2 Swivel guns	334 regulars

Casualties and losses
None	3 killed 14 wounded Total: 17

Campbell was later criticized by some writers for his defeat at Rock Island Rapids. Some claimed he did not place enough guards at his camp. Others blamed his lack of experience, while others said he disregarded warnings of an imminent Indian attack.

=== Second Expedition ===
On August 23, 1814, another expedition led by Major Zachary Taylor of the 7th Regular Infantry was formed at Cap au Gris to recapture Fort Shelby and Prairie du Chien which had fallen to the British on July 20. The expedition consisted of 334 regulars and 8 keelboats. Another purpose was to reclaim free passage through the Upper Mississippi River by defeating Sauk villages along the riverbed and possibly engaging in negotiations. The plan was to destroy the main Sauk village on the Rock river upstream from its confluence with the Mississippi.

On September 4, Taylor's expedition reached the riverbed. Taylor realized his artillery would not be effective in destroying the Sauk village from his boats and disembarking was not possible due to the large numbers of Indians. He decided to feint movement upriver towards Prairie. While doing so a strong storm forced the Americans to land at Pelican island for the night. Two of the keelboats had poor anchors, and so were tied off on the shore.

=== Battle of Credit Island ===
On September 4–5, 1814 the Battle of Credit Island, one of the westernmost battles of the War of 1812 was fought here between Sauk Indians with British support and a regiment under the command of Major Zachary Taylor.

== See also ==
- Illinois Territory in the War of 1812
- Siege of Prairie du Chien
- List of battles fought in Illinois
