= Cap au Gris, Missouri =

Unincorporated community in Missouri, U.S.

Coordinates: 38°59′56″N 90°41′30″W

Cap au Gris is an unincorporated community in Lincoln County, in the U.S. state of Missouri.

== History ==
Cap au Gris was platted in 1845. The community took its name from historic Fort Cap au Gris, which once stood near the town site. A post office called Cap au Gris was established in 1845, and remained in operation until 1883.
