= Bellfountain =

Bellfountain may refer to:

- Bellfountain, Indiana
- Bellfountain, Oregon

== See also ==
- Bellefontaine (disambiguation)
