= Fort Shelby (Wisconsin) =

1814–1815 fort in Wisconsin, before Fort Crawford

- Prairie du Chien, Wisconsin in United States

Site information
- Type: Fort
- Other names: Fort McKay

Location
- Location within Wisconsin
- Coordinates: 43°2′37″N 91°8′49″W

Site history
- Built: 1814
- Demolished: 1815
- Battles/wars: Siege of Prairie du Chien

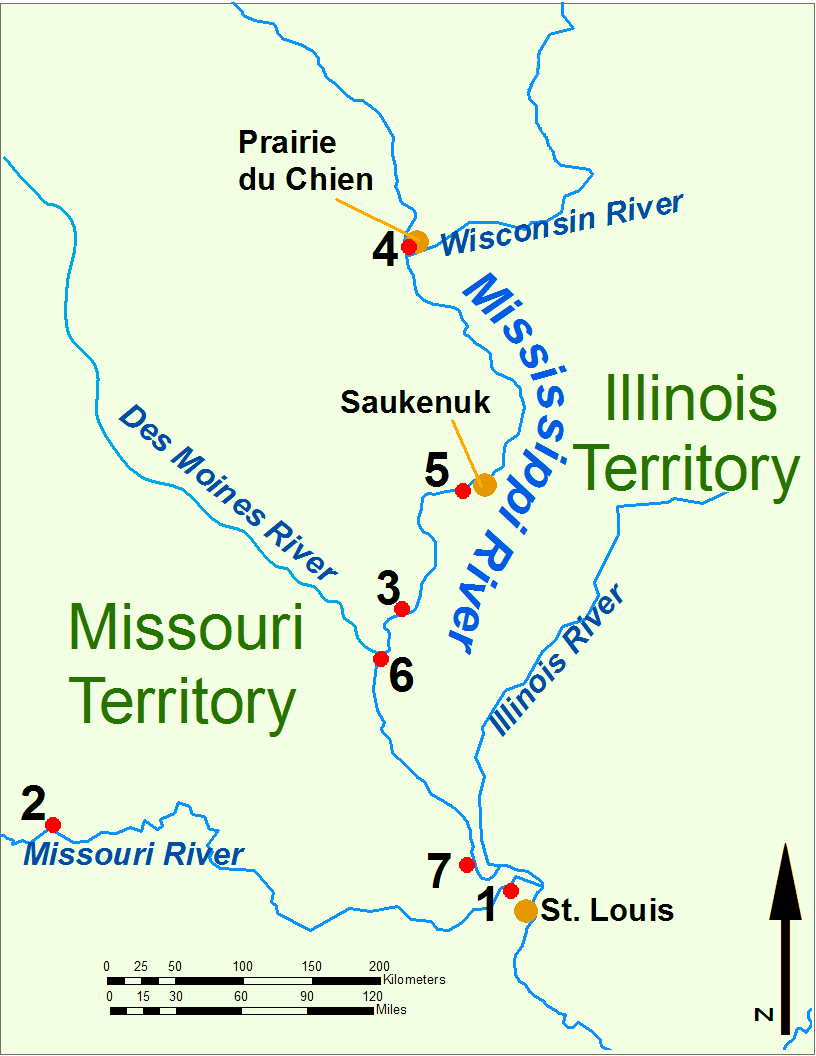
The Upper Mississippi River during the War of 1812. 1: Fort Belle Fontaine U.S. headquarters; 2: Fort Osage, abandoned 1813; 3: Fort Madison, defeated 1813; 4: Fort Shelby, defeated 1814; 5: Battle of Rock Island Rapids, July 1814 and the Battle of Credit Island, Sept. 1814; 6: Fort Johnson, abandoned 1814; 7: Fort Cap au Gris and the Battle of the Sink Hole, May 1815.

Fort Shelby was a United States military installation in Prairie du Chien. Illinois Territory, built in 1814. It was named for Isaac Shelby, Revolutionary War soldier and first governor of Kentucky. The fort was captured by the British during the Siege of Prairie du Chien in July 1814. The British renamed the fort Fort McKay after Major William McKay, the commander of the forces that won the battle. Fort McKay remained under British control until 1815, when the British destroyed it before leaving the area. Fort Crawford was built on the same site in 1816.
