= Fort Belle Fontaine County Park =

Public park in St. Louis County, Missouri, United States

Fort Belle Fontaine Park
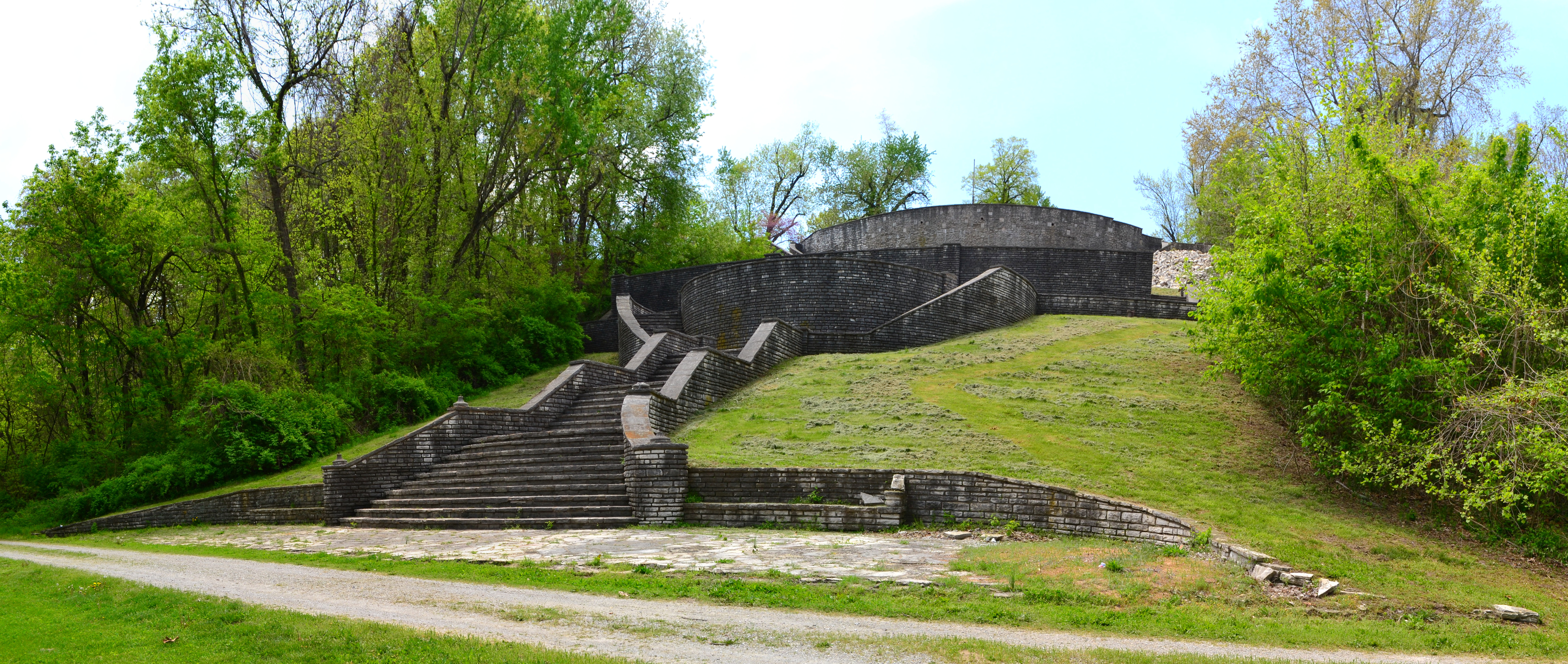
- Interactive map of Fort Belle Fontaine Park
- Type: Urban park
- Location: St. Louis County, Missouri, United States
- Coordinates: 38.825°N 90.219°W
- Area: 305.6 acres (123.7 ha)
- Created: 1986
- Operator: St. Louis County Parks and Recreation Department
- Website: St Louis County Parks and Recreation

The Fort Belle Fontaine County Park is a unit of the park system of St. Louis County, Missouri. 305.6 acres in size, it is bordered by the Missouri River, by Cold Water Creek, and by the Missouri Hills campus of the Missouri Division of Youth Services (M-DYS).

The park contains part of the site of Fort Bellefontaine, a fortified post of the United States Army first raised in 1805. The post was visited by Lewis and Clark Expedition upon their return to St. Louis in September 1806. It remained in active service, in two adjacent locations, until 1826. None of the fort remains today. As of 2014, historic markers and signage educated visitors about the vanished post.

The fort's location was built up in the 1930s as a parkland development project of the Works Progress Administration. Some WPA facilities remained in use in 2014, and others had evolved into picturesque ruined structures. A three-mile-long nature trail provides access to the creek ravine, WPA masonry, and the site of the vanished fort and trading post. Part of the parkland has been set aside as a reproduction tallgrass prairie, sown with big bluestem grasses and allied species. In the creekbed woods and adjacent uplands can be found the basswood, the burr oak, the chinquapin oak, and other mature-growth species of trees.

The park shares a common boundary and entry point with the M-DYS juvenile detention center, and as of 2014 visitors to the park were asked to stop and sign in at a security checkpoint.
