= Battle of the Sink Hole =

Battle of the War of 1812

Coordinates: 38.933384°N 90.687068°W

- Part of American Indian Wars and War of 1812
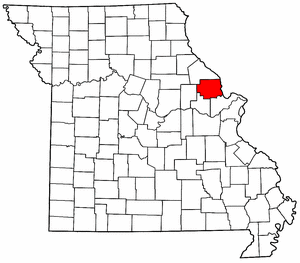
- Site of the battle was in Lincoln County, Missouri
Date	May 24, 1815
Location	Near present-day Old Monroe, Lincoln County, Missouri, US
Result	Inconclusive

Belligerents
Sauk; Meskwaki	United States; Missouri Rangers

Commanders and leaders
Black Hawk	(United States) Peter Craig †

Strength
~35	~70

Casualties and losses
at least 1 killed	8 killed 5 wounded 1 missing

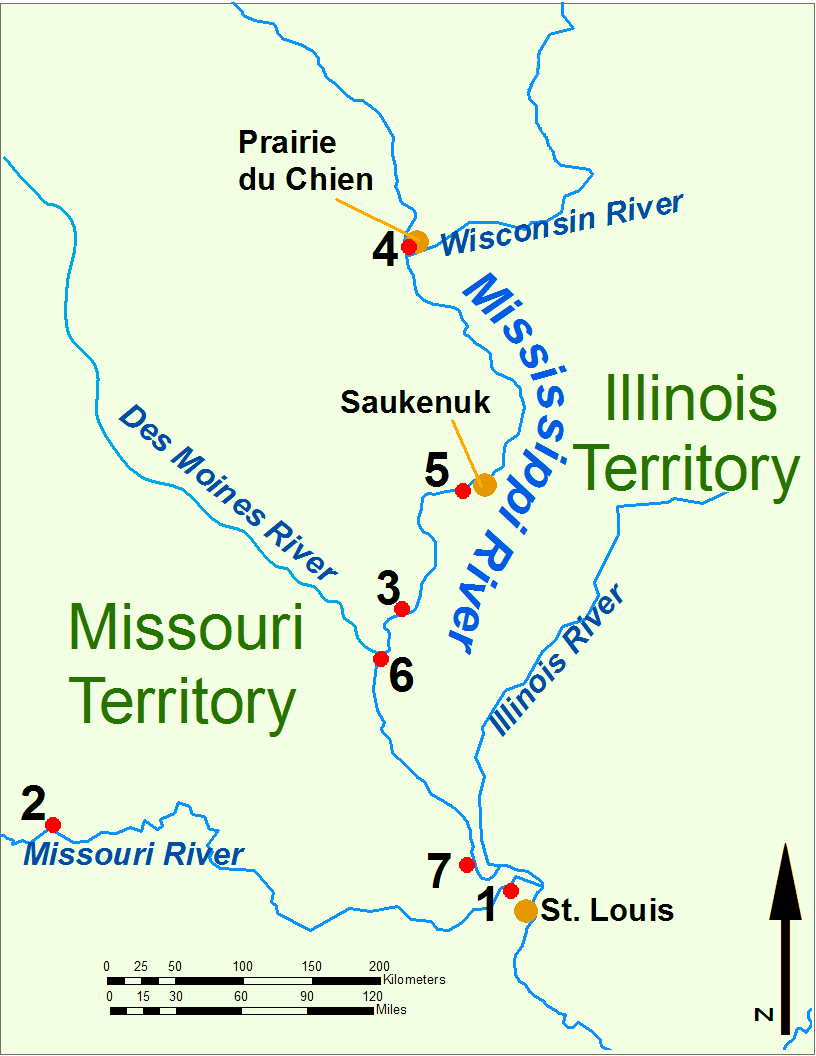
The Upper Mississippi River during the War of 1812. 1: Fort Bellefontaine U.S. headquarters; 2: Fort Osage, abandoned 1813; 3: Fort Madison, defeated 1813; 4: Fort Shelby, defeated 1814; 5: Battle of Rock Island Rapids, July 1814 and the Battle of Credit Island, Sept. 1814; 6: Fort Johnson, abandoned 1814; 7: Fort Cap au Gris and the Battle of the Sink Hole, May 1815.

The Battle of the Sink Hole, sometimes known as "Forgotten War", was fought on May 24, 1815, after the official end of the War of 1812, between Missouri Rangers and Sauk people led by Black Hawk. According to Robert McDouall, the British commander in the area, the Sauk had not received official word from the British that the Treaty of Ghent had ended the war with the U.S.

The battle was fought in a low spot near the mouth of the Cuivre River in Missouri, site of the present-day city of Old Monroe in what is now Lincoln County near Fort Howard and Fort Cap au Gris.

A contingent of 50 Rangers and Regulars, led by Captain Peter Craig, confronted the Sauk and Meskwaki tribes roughly 300 meters south of Fort Howard. Captain David Musick, with 20 soldiers from Cape au Gris, joined the fray from the Cuivre River, located 3 kilometers south of the initial engagement. The Sauk and Meskwaki forces split, with some retreating north to Bob's Creek, while Black Hawk and about 20-35 warriors sought refuge in a sinkhole, about 12-15 feet wide and 60 feet long. American forces partially encircled the sinkhole, effectively trapping Black Hawk's group. The karst terrain of the sinkhole provided natural cover, allowing the Native American forces to hold their ground despite being outnumbered by the superior American forces. Both groups pulled back at nightfall, and the outcome of the battle was uncertain.

An ambush by the Sauk of a company of rangers led to a prolonged siege: seven Rangers (including their commander, Captain Peter Craig) and one Sauk were killed and an additional 3 Rangers were wounded. Conflicting accounts of the action were given by John Shaw and by Black Hawk.

The rangers spent almost an hour creating a moving wooden battery, with portholes they could shoot through. However, the warriors fired their own rounds through said portholes, killing one ranger, Lt. Edward Spears, and wounding several others before the battery was abandoned.

After the battle, in 1816, Black Hawk entered into negotiations with the US government, ultimately reaffirming the Treaty of St. Louis.

== Background ==
The context in which the battle occurred includes the increasing instabilities in the American frontier region in the early part of the nineteenth century, particularly in the War of 1812. While the war took place between the United States and the British Empire, Indigenous peoples also became participants as they sided with the British against the Americans in an attempt to impede American expansion westward into Native territories in the Old Northwest region. The people who became engaged in the battle included the Sauk and Meskwaki tribes, among others, including the eventual Sauk leader Black Hawk.

In times of conflict, warfare on the frontier was often more intense and decentralized than combat in other regions. While many famous battles took place along the Canadian border and Eastern Seaboard, warfare in the Old Northwest often involved raids, ambushes, attacks on forts, and battles between militia units and Indigenous tribes. Black Hawk served as an ally to the British during several battles and became strongly associated with what Americans referred to as the "British Band". Many Native groups believed that, in the event of victory or peace negotiations, a Native buffer state could be established between the United States and British Canada.

A pivotal point arose when the Treaty of Ghent was signed on December 24, 1814. The treaty marked the end of the War of 1812 and restored pre-war boundaries between the United States and Britain. Significantly, the treaty did not involve Indigenous tribes despite their heavy involvement in the war. The Treaty of Ghent did not establish the desired Native buffer state, nor did it prevent continued American expansion westward. Even after the treaty was ratified in February 1815, communication across the western frontier remained poor, and many Indigenous communities and frontier fighters had not yet received news that the war had ended.

In the months following the treaty, violence continued along the western frontier. Sauk warriors and other Native groups carried out raids in what is now Missouri and Illinois due to ongoing tensions involving land disputes and American military expansion.

Missouri frontier communities responded by organizing militia and ranger units to protect settlements and military posts. American settlers remained distrustful of Native groups allied with the British, especially warriors associated with Black Hawk. It was amid these tensions and continuing frontier violence that the battle near the Cuivre River in present-day Missouri occurred on May 24, 1815. During the battle, a contingent of Missouri Rangers led by Captain Peter Craig fought Sauk and Meskwaki warriors under the leadership of Black Hawk. After an initial skirmish, Black Hawk and his warriors retreated into a natural sinkhole, where they resisted repeated attempts by American forces to capture them. The battle is often considered one of the final engagements associated with the War of 1812 because it occurred after the signing of the Treaty of Ghent.

== Battle ==
The battle took place on May 24, 1815, at the Sink Hole near the Cuivre River in present-day Lincoln County, Missouri, when a combined force of Sauk and Meskwaki warriors under Black Hawk clashed with Missouri Rangers led by Captain Peter Craig. Although the War of 1812 had officially ended with the Treaty of Ghent in December 1814, violence persisted on the frontier because some Indigenous groups had not received news of the peace treaty while others continued resisting American expansion into their territories. Historians Patrick Jung and John Sugden note that the Sauk remained deeply hostile toward the United States following the War of 1812.

According to historical accounts, the confrontation began when Missouri Rangers discovered a group of Sauk and Meskwaki warriors operating near Fort Howard and Cap au Gris. Captain Peter Craig advanced with approximately 50 mounted Rangers, while Captain David Musick approached with additional troops from Cap au Gris. When the Americans moved toward the Sauk position, the Native force split apart. Some warriors escaped northward toward Bob's Creek, while Black Hawk and approximately 20 to 35 warriors retreated into a large natural sinkhole. Geological studies of the battlefield describe the sinkhole as a karst depression approximately sixty feet long, fifteen feet wide, and ten to twelve feet deep, with steep limestone walls that created a naturally fortified defensive position.

The opening moments of the battle were chaotic and deadly. According to historical sources, Captain Peter Craig exposed himself while attempting to observe the Sauk position and was shot and killed. The Rangers then surrounded the sinkhole and attempted to fire downward into it, but the terrain strongly favored the defenders. In order to gain a clear shot, American fighters had to move closer to the rim of the sinkhole, exposing themselves to return fire from the Sauk warriors below. Historian Douglas Gifford argued that the sinkhole transformed what could have been a quick engagement into a prolonged stalemate because the Sauk position was extremely difficult to assault directly.

As the battle continued into the afternoon, both sides reportedly resorted to psychological warfare tactics. Frontier accounts describe Sauk warriors singing death songs and taunting the Rangers from within the sinkhole. Meanwhile, the Rangers attempted to devise a way to assault the position without suffering heavy casualties. Lieutenant Edward Spears proposed constructing a makeshift wooden shield using wagon wheels and heavy wooden planks. The Rangers spent nearly an hour constructing the movable barricade, which included firing holes intended to allow soldiers to shoot safely while advancing toward the sinkhole. However, the strategy failed after Sauk warriors identified an opening beneath the structure and fired through it, killing Spears and wounding several Rangers.

By the end of the day, neither side had achieved a decisive victory. The Rangers failed to destroy or capture Black Hawk's warriors, while the Sauk remained trapped within the sinkhole and were unable to break through the surrounding militia during daylight. Under cover of darkness, Black Hawk led his warriors out of the sinkhole and escaped the battlefield. American troops did not continue the pursuit. Casualty estimates vary among historical accounts, though most sources agree that the Rangers suffered heavier losses than the Sauk, including the deaths of Captain Craig and Lieutenant Spears. Historians generally describe the battle as tactically inconclusive, although Black Hawk's successful defense against a larger force strengthened his reputation as a military leader. The engagement is frequently regarded as one of the final battles associated with the War of 1812 because it occurred after the signing of the Treaty of Ghent.

== Legacy ==
The significance of the Battle of the Sink Hole lies primarily in its demonstration that frontier warfare continued well after the official end of the War of 1812. Historians have noted that the battle illustrated how peace treaties negotiated between the United States and Britain did not automatically resolve conflicts involving Indigenous nations in the Old Northwest. The Treaty of Ghent, which officially ended hostilities between the United States and Britain in 1814, did not include the Sauk and Meskwaki as major negotiating parties, and many Native communities remained concerned about continued American expansion into their territories. Historian John Sugden argued that many Native groups believed that their British allies had abandoned them after encouraging Indigenous resistance during the war.

The battle also contributed to the growing reputation of Black Hawk as a military leader and symbol of Indigenous resistance. Although the engagement itself was relatively small in scale, Black Hawk's successful defense within the sinkhole against a larger militia force became an important part of his historical legacy. Patrick Jung argued that Black Hawk's experiences during the War of 1812 and the Battle of the Sink Hole increased his distrust of the United States government and strengthened his determination to resist further American settlement in Sauk territory. Historians have linked these experiences to the political tensions that later contributed to the outbreak of the Black Hawk War in 1832.

The military legacy of the battle is also notable because the terrain played a major role in the outcome of the engagement. Historians and geological studies have emphasized that the sinkhole provided a small group of Sauk warriors with a highly effective defensive position against a numerically superior militia force. One of the more unusual tactical developments during the battle was the Rangers' attempt to construct a movable wooden shield, sometimes described as a "moving battery", to approach the sinkhole safely. Despite its significance in frontier military history, the battle itself did not substantially alter territorial boundaries or national politics.

The memory of the Battle of the Sink Hole has remained important in Missouri regional history and in scholarship concerning Black Hawk. The battle site later became recognized as a historic location, and the engagement is frequently discussed as one of the final military actions associated with the War of 1812. Historians have often noted that because the battle occurred months after the signing of the Treaty of Ghent, it demonstrated the limitations of diplomacy and communication on the American frontier. News of peace traveled slowly across frontier regions, and many settlements and Native communities continued operating under wartime conditions even after the formal declaration of peace.
