= Fort Belle Fontaine =

- Fort Belle Fontaine; Cantonment Belle Fontaine
- U.S. National Register of Historic Places
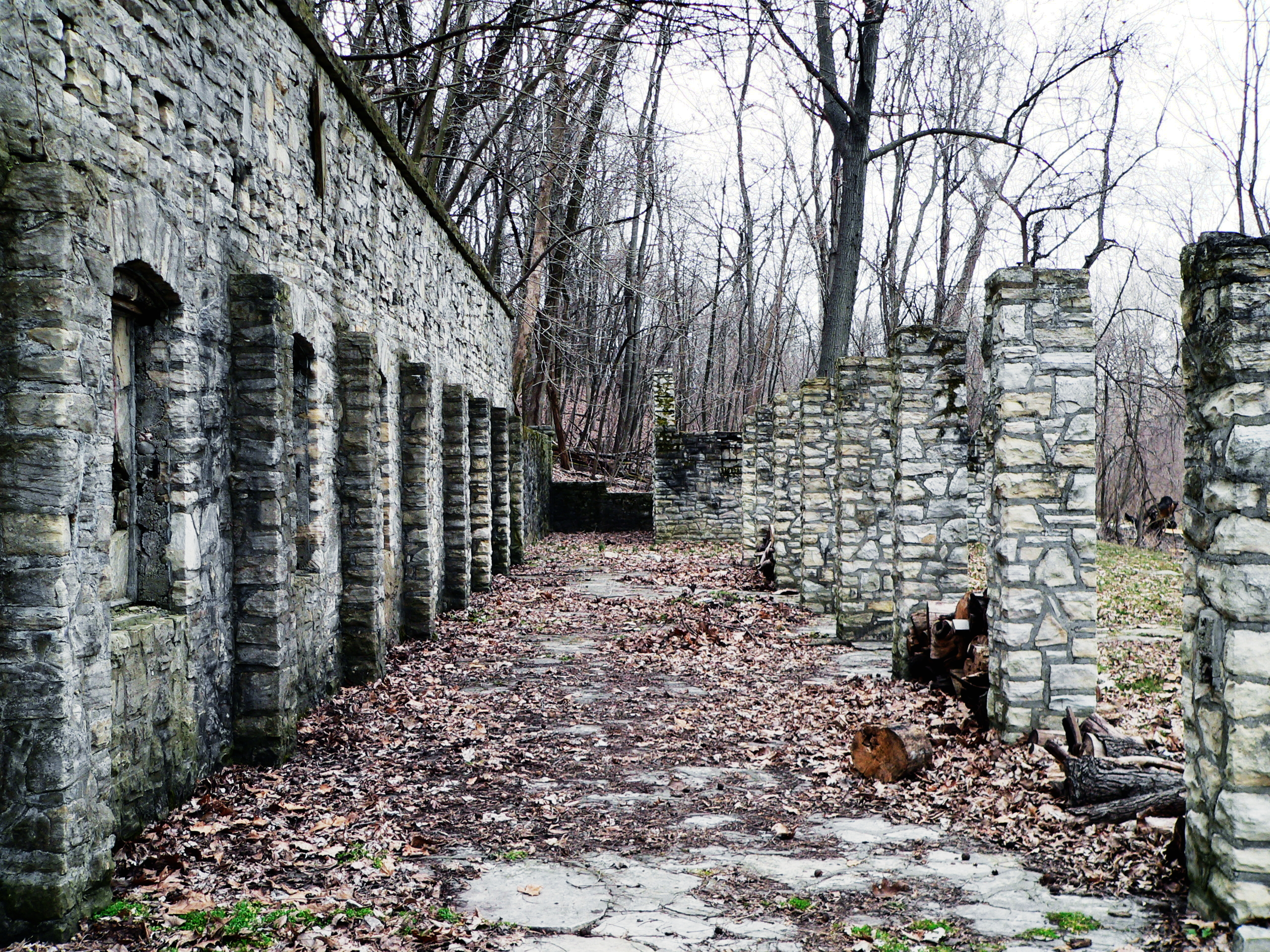
- Resort ruins in March 2005

- Location within Missouri
- Location: Fort Belle Fontaine County Park; St. Louis County, Missouri
- Coordinates: 38°49′36″N 90°12′59″W
- Built: August 10, 1805 (221 years ago)
- NRHP reference No.: 16000031
- Added to NRHP: February 23, 2016

Fort Belle Fontaine, formerly known as Cantonment Belle Fontaine, is a former U.S. military base located in St. Louis County, Missouri, across the Mississippi and Missouri rivers from Alton, Illinois. The fort was the first U.S. military installation west of the Mississippi, in the newly acquired Louisiana Territory, and served as a starting point for many expeditions to the American West.

== History ==
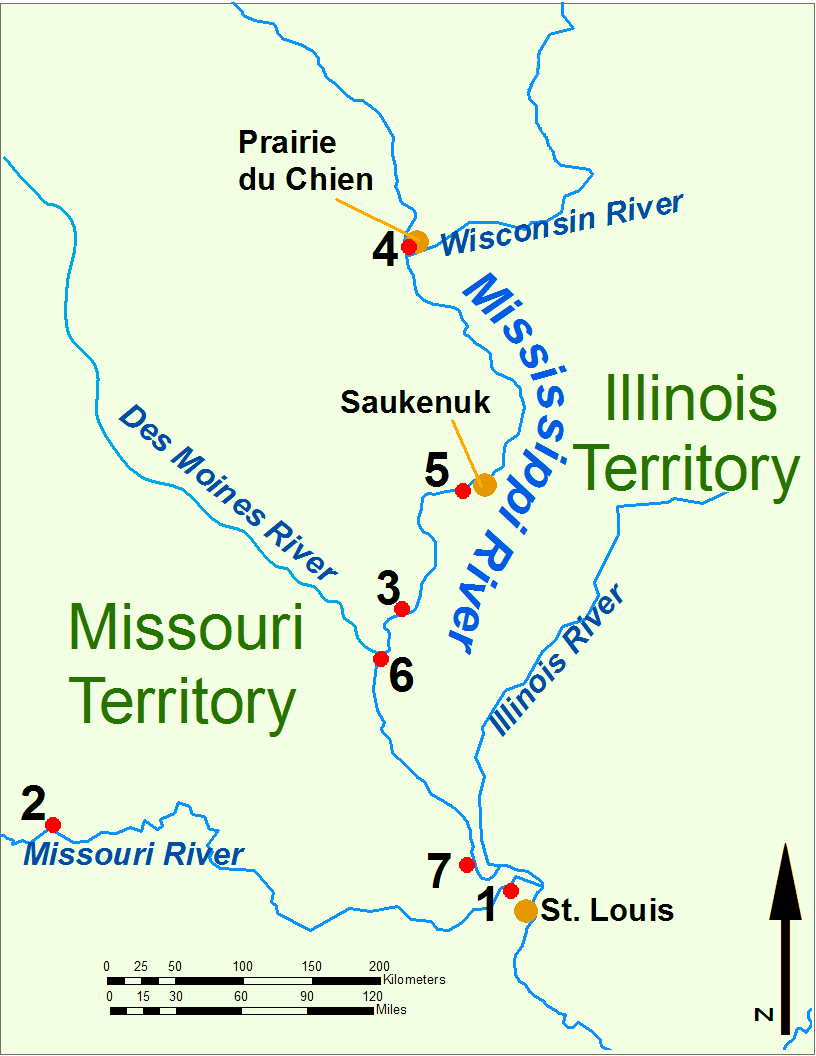
The Upper Mississippi River during the War of 1812. 1: Fort Belle Fontaine U.S. headquarters; 2: Fort Osage, abandoned 1813; 3: Fort Madison, defeated 1813; 4: Fort Shelby, defeated 1814; 5: Battle of Rock Island Rapids, July 1814 and the Battle of Credit Island, Sept. 1814; 6: Fort Johnson, abandoned 1814; 7: Fort Cap au Gris and the Battle of the Sink Hole, May 1815.

Located on the south bank of the Missouri River, in present-day Missouri, Fort Belle Fontaine was first a Spanish military post. After the Louisiana Purchase, and after the U.S. government's William H. Harrison and representatives of the Native American Sauk and Meskwaki tribes signed a treaty on November 3, 1804, the fort in 1805 became a fur trading post of the U.S. government. Rudolf Tiller served as factor and Colonel Thomas Hunt served as the military commander.

The trading post was discontinued after 1808, and from 1809 to 1826 the facility served as a United States military fort. From about 1809 to 1815, it served as the headquarters of the Department of Louisiana, and was the regional Army headquarters during the War of 1812. Its sister forts were Fort Osage along the Missouri near modern Kansas City, which controlled trade with western Indians; and Fort Madison in what is now Iowa, which controlled trade of the Upper Mississippi.

The Old Fort Belle Fontaine Cemetery was established in 1809, when Lieutenant Colonel Daniel Bissell moved the original Fort Belle Fontaine encampment to a new location. The cemetery was located about 100 yards or so southwest from the Cantonment buildings, which during the period of 1805 to 1826 had interments of at least 30–40 military officers, and about 100 enlisted soldiers. The location was confirmed to be along the bluffs on the south bank of the Missouri River about a hundred yards southeast along the bluff past the old abandoned block house, when W.T. Norton visited the site in 1911. The old cemetery on the bluff was strewn with rocks and mortar, the debris of old tombs. All the tombs were in a more or less ruinous condition. The tombs were built of masonry, about two feet above the ground, and upon them rested the memorial tables. Most of the inscriptions were illegible. In 1904, newspaper stories, most notably in The St. Louis Republic, recorded the recovery and moving of 33 burials with headstones to the new Jefferson Barracks National Cemetery. A considerable number of unmarked burials remain at the now-decertified cemetery. The article in The St. Louis Republic included rough photos and drawings of the site. This old cemetery is not related to the Bellefontaine Cemetery established in 1849 on the road leading to Fort Belle Fontaine, and initially called the Rural Cemetery.

== Preservation ==
Part of the site of the fort is preserved as the Fort Belle Fontaine County Park, a unit of the park system of St. Louis County, Missouri. An archaeological site associated with the fort was listed on the National Register of Historic Places in 2016.

== See also ==
- National Register of Historic Places listings in St. Louis County, Missouri
