= Calamanco =

Fabric

Calamanco (also calimanco, callimanco, or kalamink) is a fabric with a glazed surface that was popular in Europe and the United States in the 18th and 19th centuries. It was typically made of worsted-spun wool yarn, and the glazing was achieved by calendering (pressing the cloth between hot rollers), by surface-rubbing with a stone, or by applying wax to the surface. The name comes from a Spanish term for worsted wool.

Calamanco goes back to the late 16th century but was most popular in the 18th and 19th centuries. It was made in a number of different weaves, including plain and satin weaves, damasks and brocades. Early in the period, it was used in clothing, but later on it was more commonly used for bed coverings, and surviving fragments are often found in quilts of the era, especially whole-cloth quilts. The surface sheen of the calamanco sets off intricate quilting patterns.

== In popular culture ==
Calimanco has also been used as an alternative name for calico cats. It appears to have originated as a regional term in the English county of Norfolk. Norwich in Norfolk was a center of calamanco manufacture.

Calamanco is the name of a mare in Great Britain born around 1990; several of her offspring won races in the early 2000s.
