= Fort Osage =

Former fort in Missouri, U.S.

- U.S. National Register of Historic Places
- U.S. National Historic Landmark District
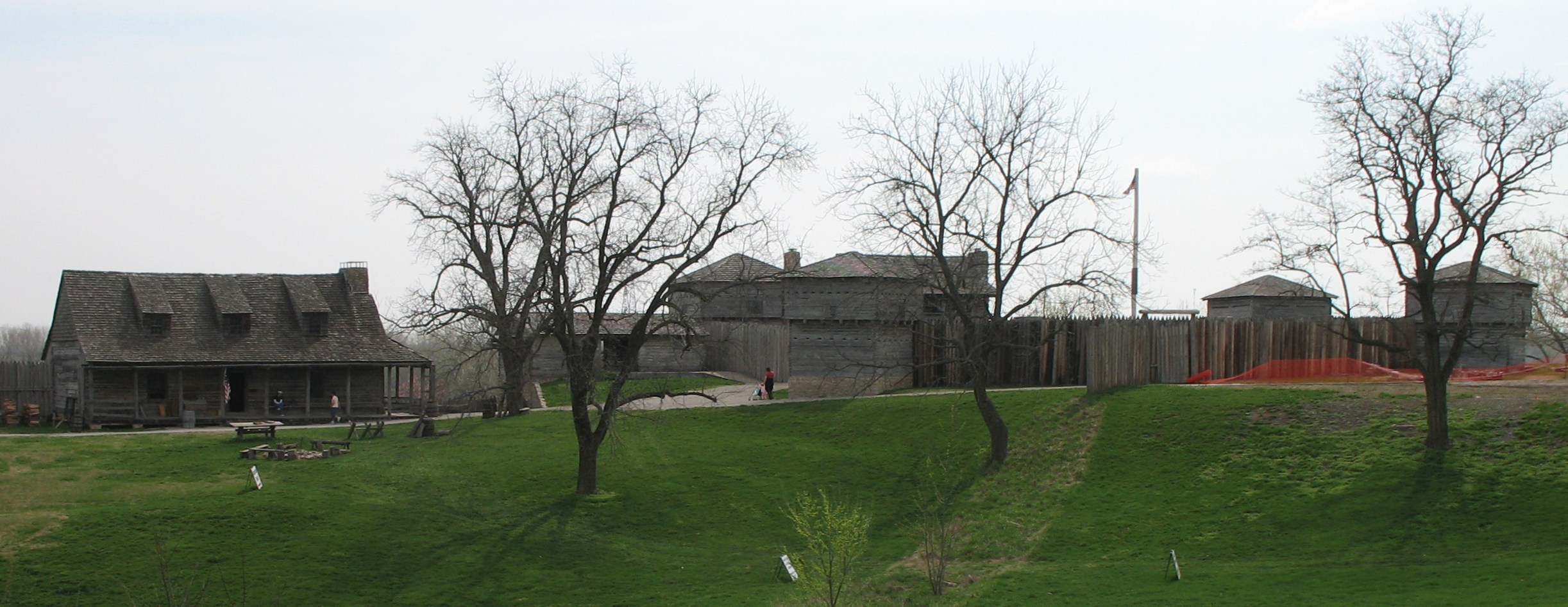
- Fort Osage from the west. The "factory" trading post is on the left.

- Location within Missouri Location within the United States
- Location: Sibley, Missouri
- Coordinates: 39°11′15″N 94°11′32″W
- Built: 1808
- NRHP reference No.: 66000418

Significant dates
- Added to NRHP: October 15, 1966
- Designated NHLD: November 5, 1961

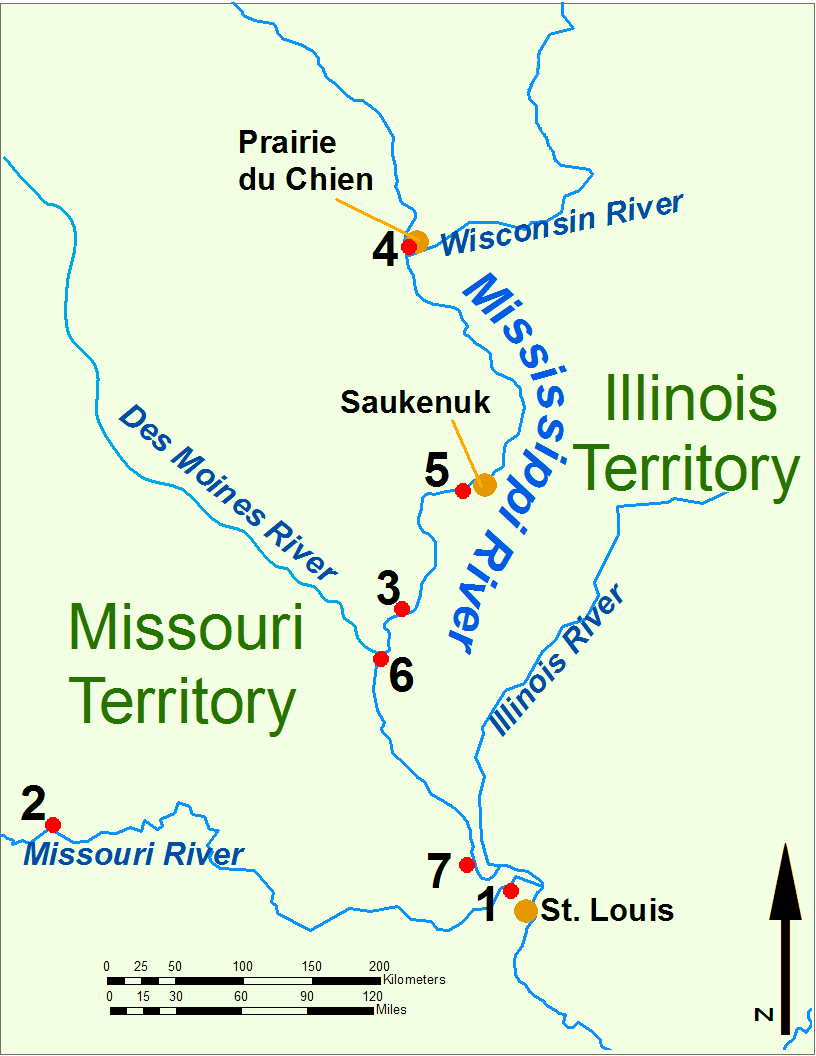
The Upper Mississippi River during the War of 1812. 1: Fort Belle Fontaine U.S. headquarters; 2: Fort Osage, abandoned 1813; 3: Fort Madison, defeated 1813; 4: Fort Shelby, defeated 1814; 5: Battle of Rock Island Rapids, July 1814 and the Battle of Credit Island, Sept. 1814; 6: Fort Johnson, abandoned 1814; 7: Fort Cap au Gris and the Battle of the Sink Hole, May 1815.

Fort Osage (also known as Fort Clark or Fort Sibley) was an early 19th-century factory trading post run by the United States Government in western Missouri on the American frontier; it was located in present-day Sibley, Missouri. The Treaty of Fort Clark, signed with certain members of the Osage Nation in 1808, called for the United States to establish Fort Osage as a trading post and to protect the Osage from tribal enemies.

It was one of three forts established by the U.S. Army to establish control over the newly acquired Louisiana Purchase territories west of the Mississippi River. Fort Madison in SE Iowa was built to control trade and pacify Native Americans in the Upper Mississippi River region. Fort Belle Fontaine, near St. Louis, controlled the mouth of the Missouri at the Mississippi.

Fort Osage ceased operations in the 1820s as the Osage in subsequent treaties had ceded the rest of their land in Missouri to the US. A replica of the fort was constructed on the site between 1948 and 1961. The Fort Osage school district (including Fort Osage High School), which serves northeast Independence and the surrounding area, was named after it.

== Background ==
During their famous expedition up the Missouri River in seeking the Northwest Passage to the Pacific Ocean, Americans Meriwether Lewis and William Clark noted this spot in June 1804, as they camped for the night just across the river:

high commanding position, more than 70 feet above high-water mark, and overlooking the river, which is here but of little depth...

In the same year Pierre Chouteau, part of the Chouteau fur trading family and an agent for the Osage, took Osage chiefs to Washington, DC to meet President Thomas Jefferson who promised to build them a trading post. Previously Jefferson promoted his plan of expanding Federal trading posts on the frontier as means to remove the harmful influence of individual merchants by "undersell[ing] private traders" to make them withdraw from borderlands and "earn the good will of the Indians".

== Foundation ==
William Clark led a team in September 1808 back to the site to begin construction of Fort Osage. In November 1808 Pierre Chouteau negotiated the Treaty of Fort Clark with certain members of the Osage Nation, for the fort to be built for the protection of the Osage. The specific terms of the deal noted:

The United States being anxious to promote peace, friendship and intercourse with the Osage tribes, to afford them every assistance in their power, and to protect them from the insults and injuries of other tribes of Indians, situated near the settlements of the white people, have thought proper to build a fort on the right bank of the Missouri, a few miles above the Fire Prairie, and do agree to garrison the same with as many regular troops as the President of the United States may, from time to time, deem necessary for the protection of all orderly, friendly and well disposed Indians of the Great and Little Osage nations, who reside at this place, and who do strictly conform to, and pursue the counsels or admonitions of the President of the United States through his subordinate officers.

In exchange for access to the trading post, the attending Osage agreed to cede all of their lands east of the fort in Louisiana Territory to the US. This effectively left them with a small band of territory on the extreme western border of what is now the state of Missouri. The Great Osage were to receive $1,000 and the Little Osage were to get $500.

The government trading post was established in 1808 and removed to Arrow Rock in 1813.

== Operations ==
The fort was officially christened "Fort Osage" by Captain Eli Clemson; he commanded the military garrison at Fort Osage from 1808 until it was evacuated in 1813. It has also been informally referred to as "Fort Clark" in honor of William Clark, who was in charge of Indian Affairs. It was one of the first United States military installations in Louisiana Territory and became a major stopping point for visitors traveling the Missouri. Daniel Boone visited it in 1816, at the age of 82, while on one of his last hunting trips. Sacagawea and her husband, Toussaint Charbonneau, who had accompanied the Lewis and Clark Expedition, also stayed at the fort on their way back north to Dakota Territory after time in St. Louis.

Fort Osage was abandoned in June 1813 during the War of 1812 because it was not considered to be under threat. Since most of the war's fighting was further east and north, the soldiers there were transferred to different locations. After the war the fort was reoccupied in 1815. Fort Osage was for many years a productive trading location, with the first Factor George C. Sibley reporting prosperous trade with the Osage due to goods being sold "at prices less than half what the traders extort from them..."

=== Abandonment ===
The end of the War of 1812 and the Adams–Onís Treaty removed the threat of Spanish or British-backed Indigenous campaigns against the United States throughout the Louisiana Purchase. As the Osage ceded more and more of their land, the US established a new trading post at Fort Scott, Kansas, closer to the ancestral villages near the headwaters of the Osage River near Nevada, Missouri.

Fort Osage formally was closed in 1822, but remained a landmark on the Santa Fe Trail and a transit point for supplies going north. By 1836 it had been obliterated; local settlers took its pre-cut wood to use for building houses and barns. The factory house was the last remaining structure, but it burned to the ground, leaving only the rock foundation.

== Fort Osage National Historic Landmark ==
Archaeologists rediscovered the foundations of Fort Osage in the 1940s. The station was reconstructed to portray Fort Osage as it was in 1812 by using the preserved surveys created by William Clark and others. This made restoration to exact specifications possible.

The rebuilt post has been designated as Fort Osage National Historic Landmark and is listed on the National Register of Historic Places. It is owned and operated by Jackson County Parks and Recreation of Missouri. It is open to the public Tuesday through Sunday from 9:00am to 4:30pm year round.

The Fort Osage Education Center, opened in November 2007, contains exhibits about the site's geology, 19th century natural history, the Hopewell and Osage native cultures, Lewis and Clark, Fort Osage, and the Missouri River. In addition, the location has living history demonstrations about early 19th-century military and civilian life.

== See also ==
- List of National Historic Landmarks in Missouri
- National Register of Historic Places listings in Jackson County, Missouri
