= Fort Cap au Gris =

Military fort in Missouri, US

Coordinates: 38.9958333°N 90.6844444°W

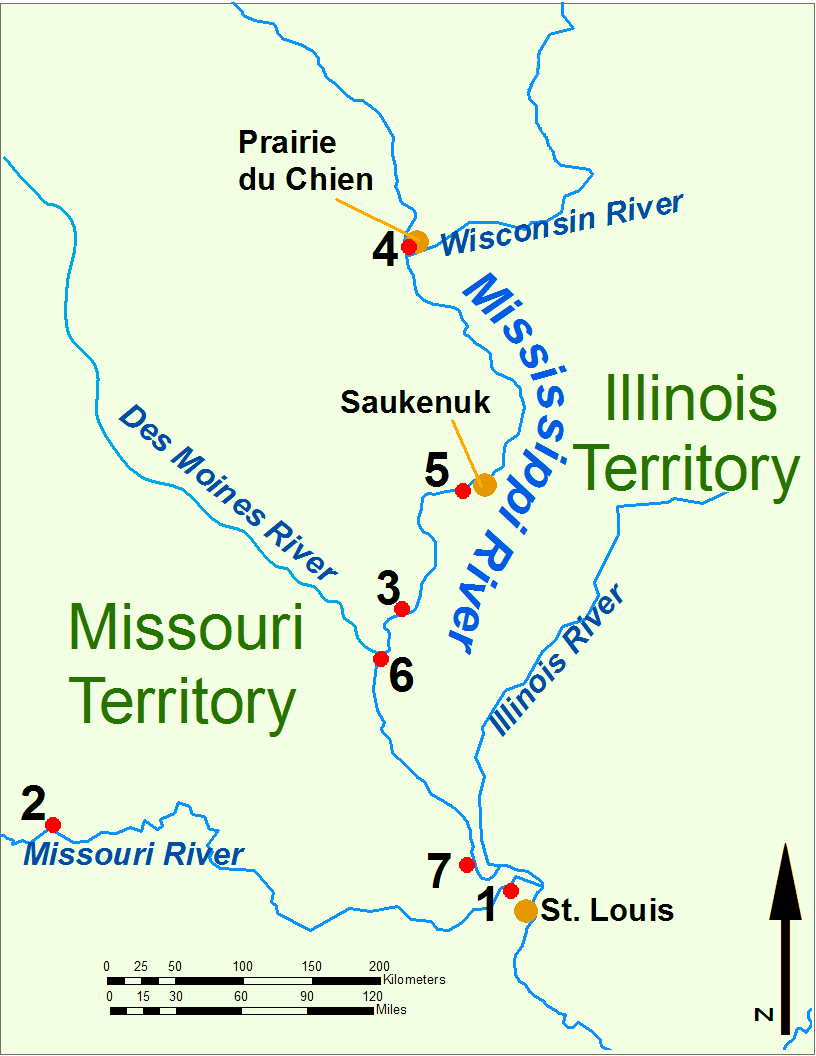
The Upper Mississippi River during the War of 1812. 1: Fort Bellefontaine U.S. headquarters; 2: Fort Osage, abandoned 1813; 3: Fort Madison, defeated 1813; 4: Fort Shelby, defeated 1814; 5: Battle of Rock Island Rapids, July 1814 and the Battle of Credit Island, Sept. 1814; 6: Fort Johnson, abandoned 1814; 7: Fort Cap au Gris and the Battle of the Sink Hole, May 1815.

Fort Cap au Gris, also called Capo Gray, was a temporary fort built in September 1814 near Troy, Missouri during the War of 1812 by Missouri Rangers under the direction of Nathan Boone, son of Daniel Boone, the famous American pioneer and frontiersman. After the defeat of Fort Johnson, U.S. Army soldiers under the command of Zachary Taylor retreated to Cap au Gris in October 1814.

The Battle of the Sink Hole was fought near Cap au Gris in May 1815.

The unincorporated community of Cap au Gris, Missouri today occupies the site of the old fort.
