= Credit Island =

Island in the Mississippi River

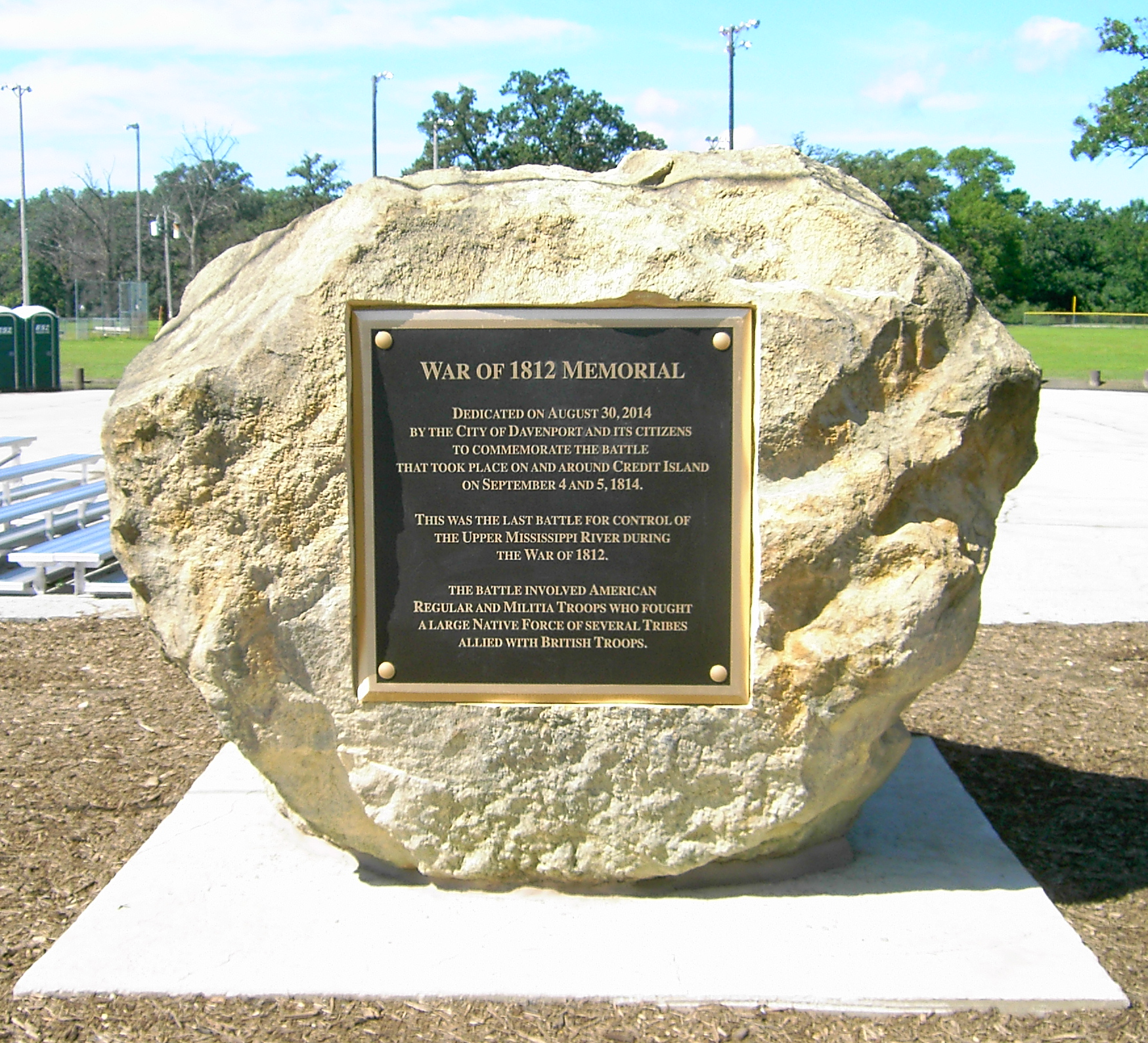
- War of 1812 Memorial on Credit Island
- Interactive map of Credit Island
- Type: Public park
- Location: Davenport, Scott County, Iowa, US
- Coordinates: 41°29′45″N 90°36′56″W
- Area: 420-acre (1.7 km^{2})
- Operator: Davenport Parks and Recreation Department
- Open: All year

Davenport Register of Historic Properties
- Designated: February 3, 1999
- Reference no.: 27

Credit Island in present-day Scott County, Iowa

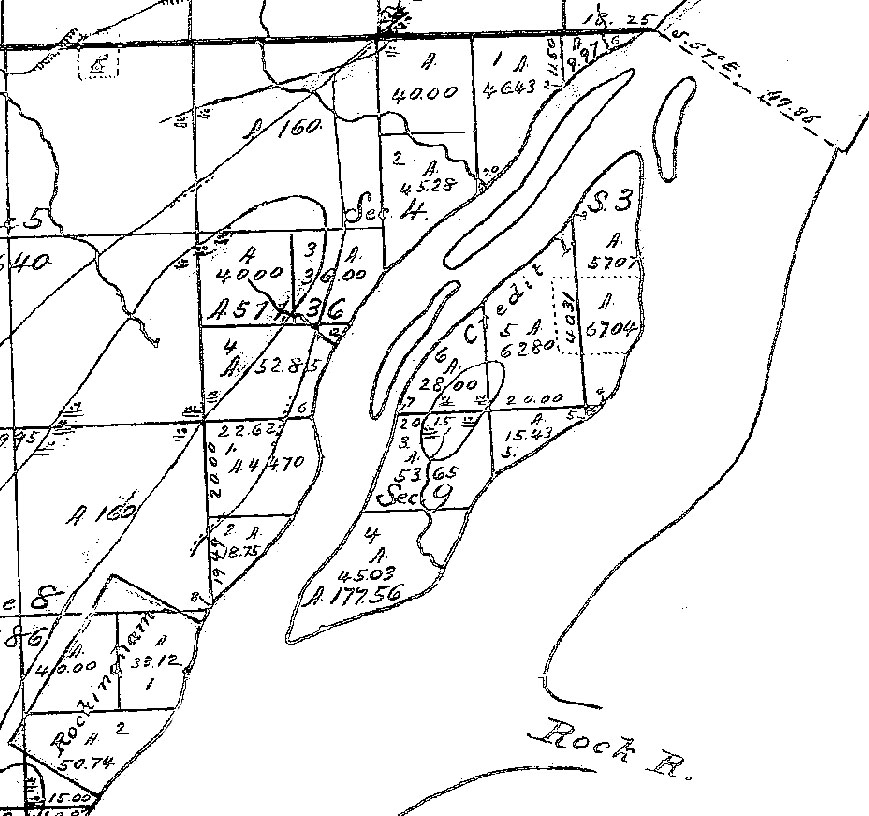
Credit Island from an 1838 GLO map

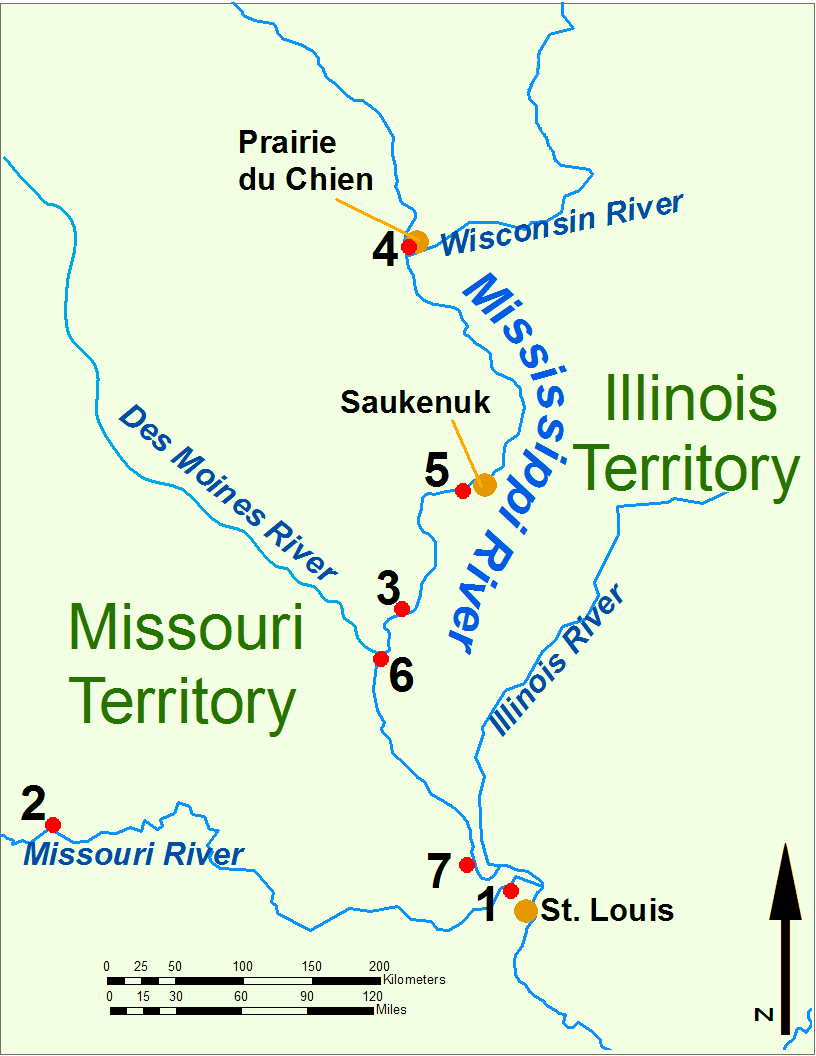
The Upper Mississippi River during the War of 1812. 1: Fort Belle Fontaine U.S. headquarters; 2: Fort Osage; 3: Fort Madison; 4: Fort Shelby; 5: Battle of Rock Island Rapids, July 1814 and the Battle of Credit Island, Sept. 1814; 6: Fort Johnson; 7: Fort Cap au Gris and the Battle of the Sink Hole, May 1815.

Battle of Credit Island
- Part of the War of 1812
Date	September 4–5, 1814
Location	Credit Island, Northwest Territory
Result	Anglo-Sauk victory

Belligerents
Sauk; United Kingdom	United States

Commanders and leaders
Black Hawk	(United States) Zachary Taylor

Strength
1,230	350

Casualties and losses
None	2 killed 11 wounded

Credit Island is an island in the Mississippi River on the south west side of Davenport, Iowa within the Quad Cities area. Its name was derived by the use of the island as a trading post for the North American fur trade. Credit could be obtained on the promise of hides and skins to be delivered at a later time, hence the name. It was listed on the Davenport Register of Historic Properties on February 3, 1999.

== War of 1812 ==
On September 4–5, 1814 the Battle of Credit Island, one of the westernmost battles of the War of 1812 was fought here between Sauk Indians with British support and a regiment under the command of Major Zachary Taylor.

=== Preparations for battle ===
Historical reference provided by Sara James Childers

British Captain Thomas G Anderson's Journal contains the following entries:

Saturday August 27, 1814 — At eight the expedition for the Rock river marched. We gave them three shots from the six pounder. At two the Feuille or Leaf (Wabasha) with fifty Sioux arrived on their way to join the expedition. Shortly after, forty Renards arrived for the same purpose. I gave them fifteen loaves of bread and sent to procure a beef that I knew was for sale but the owner sent me word if I would send him two milch cow I might get his ox. I then inquired of Mr Brisbois, from whom I have had every assistance he could possibly give, even to the distressing of his own family. He furnished a pair of two-year-old bulls which I gave to the whole of the warriors. The Feuille brought word that he had met a Renard canoe with two men in it who informed him that a Renard messenger was sent from the Illinois by the Americans with a notice to the Indians that they the Americans were on their way up here mainly to take possession of their fort at Prairie du Chien and not to hurt the Indians, that they the Indians were requested to keep out of the way, that the Americans like hunters in the wood had wounded a deer they had wounded the English and were following the track till they should ruin or destroy the whole. The Feuille heard this report too late to authorize him to take the Renard. The Feuille does not understand the Renard language himself but this was interpreted to him some time after passing the Renard canoe.

Sunday August 28 — Gave the Feuille ten bushels of wheat to take him with the Renards to the Rock River. A young lad of this place by the name of Antoine du Bois volunteered his service and embarked with the Sioux interpreter. I gave the Feuille a few articles he was absolutely in want of. Fifty Sioux of the Feuille band (The Leaf or Wabasha) with forty-five Renards left this place at two o'clock singing the war song and at six about sixteen puants arrived from above, debarked at the upper end of the village, and walked down to the lower end singing the war-song, then immediately embarked and went off. Wrote a note to Capt Grignon to prepare himself to go off express to Mackinaw to-morrow at ten o'clock.

Monday August 29 — Finished the dispatches at ten and Capt Grignon being detained in expectation of Mr Antoine Brisbois arriving from below, did not set off till four in the afternoon. Mr Brisbois did not arrive Prairie du Chien

Captain Anderson dispatched the following message, addressed to Lieutenant Colonel McDougall from Fort McKay on that same day:

Sir, the command of this post having been left to me by Lieut Col McKay, I have the honor to communicate to you that on the 27th instant I sent off a small detachment under the command of Lieut Graham of the Indian department for the Rock river, consisting of thirty men, one brass three pounder, and two swivels. Having sent Lieut Graham to that place on the 15th inst in order to get a party of Sauks to proceed with him to within two miles of the enemy's abandoned fort Madison to take possession of and if possible bring away a gun-boat that the enemy had got sunk by the fall of a tree last spring on their way up here and at the same time to get information of the enemy.

=== Opening moves ===
American Major Taylor led a force of more than 350 U.S. regulars and militia to relieve Prairie du Chien and evacuate the garrison. When Taylor's command reached the Rock River on the evening of September 4, Taylor encamped. That night, Black Hawk attacked Taylor's pickets and killed two of his men. At dawn, Taylor was preparing to land when three British guns opened fire on his boats. Under heavy fire, Taylor withdrew downstream, with a further loss of 11 men wounded.

=== Black Hawk ===
The following is Black Hawk's recollection of Campbell's Island.

Black Hawk participated in parts of this battle, really a series of small skirmishes on the island and on the river extending from Rock Island to Credit Island; he later wrote about it in his autobiography, perhaps conflating different episodes:

I discovered that one [U.S.] boat was badly managed, and was suffered to be drawn ashore by the wind. They landed by running hard aground and lowered their sail. The others passed on. This boat the Great Spirit gave to us. All that could, hurried aboard, but they were unable to push off, being fast aground. We advanced to the river's bank undercover, and commenced firing on the boat. I encouraged my braves to continue firing. Several guns were fired from the boat, but without effect. I prepared my bow and arrows to throw fire to the sail, which was lying on the boat. After two or three attempts, I succeeded in setting it on fire. The boat was soon in flames. About this time, one of the boats that had passed returned, dropped anchor and swung in close to [the] one which was on fire, taking off all the people except those who were killed or badly wounded. We could distinctly see them passing from one boat to the other, and fired on them with good effect. We wounded the war chief in this way. Another boat now came down, dropped her anchor, which did not take hold, and drifted ashore. The other boat cut her cable and drifted down the river, leaving their comrades without attempting to assist them. We then commenced an attack upon this boat, firing several rounds, which was not returned. We thought they were afraid or only had a few aboard. I therefore ordered a rush toward the boat, but when we got near enough they fired, killing two of our braves-- these being all we lost in the engagement. Some of their men jumped out and shoved the boat off, and thus got away without losing a man. I had a good opinion of this war chief, as he managed so much better than the others. It would give me pleasure to shake him by the hand.

We now put out the fire on the captured boat to save the cargo, when a skiff was seen coming down the river. Some of our people cried out, "Here comes an express from Prairie du Chien." We hoisted the British flag, but they would not land. They turned their little boat around, and rowed up the river. We directed a few shots at them, but they were so far off that we could not hurt them. I found several barrels of whisky on the captured boat, knocked in the heads and emptied the bad medicine late the river. I next found a box full of small bottles and packages, which appeared to be bad medicine also, such as the medicine men kill the white people with when they are sick. This I threw into the river. Continuing my search for plunder, I found several guns, some large barrels filled with clothing, and a number of cloth lodges, all of which I distributed among my warriors. We now disposed of the dead, and returned to the Fox village opposite the lower end of Rock Island, where we put up our new lodges, and hoisted the British flag. A great many of our braves were dressed in the uniform clothing which we had taken from the Americans, which gave our encampment the appearance of a regular camp of soldiers. We placed out sentinels and commenced dancing over the scalps we had taken. Soon after several boats passed down, among them a very large one carrying big guns. Our young men followed them some distance, but could do them no damage more than scare them. We were now certain that the fort at Prairie du Chien had been taken, as this large boat went up with the first party who built the fort.
In the course of the day some of the British came down in a small boat. They had followed the large one, thinking it would get [stuck] fast in the rapids, in which case they were sure of taking her. They had summoned her on her way down to surrender, but she refused to do so, and now, that she had passed the rapids in safety, all hope of taking her had vanished. The British landed a big gun and gave us three soldiers to manage it. They complimented us for our bravery in taking the boat, and told us what they had done at Prairie do Chien. They gave us, a keg of rum, and joined with us in our dancing and feasting. We gave them some things which we had taken from the boat, particularly books and papers. They started the next morning, promising to return in a few days with a large body of soldiers.

We went to work under the direction of the men left with us, and dug up the ground in two places to put the big gun in, that the men might remain in with it and be safe. We then sent spies down the river to reconnoitre, who sent word by a runner that several boats were coming up filled with men. I marshalled my forces and was soon ready for their arrival. I resolved to fight, as we had not yet had a fair fight with the Americans during the war. The boats arrived in the evening, stopping at a small willow island, nearly opposite to us. During the night we removed our big gun further down, and at daylight next morning commenced firing. We were pleased to see that almost every shot took effect. The British being good gunners, rarely missed. They pushed off as quickly as possible, although I had expected they would land and give us battle. I was fully prepared to meet them but was sadly disappointed by the boats all sailing down the river. A party of braves followed to watch where they landed, but they did not stop until they got below the Des Moines Rapids, where they came ashore and commenced building a fort.

== Modern times ==
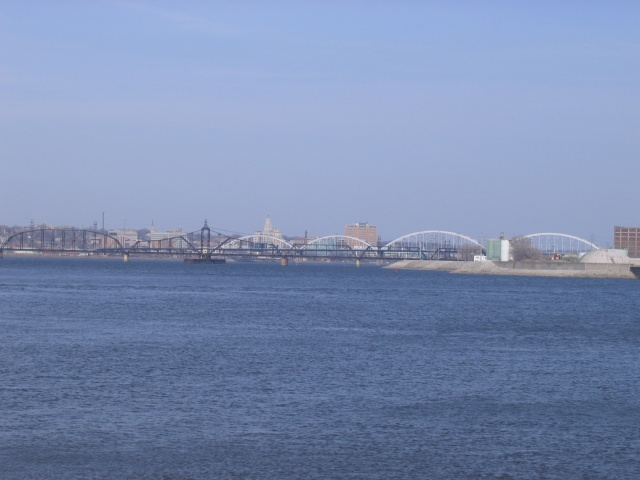
Davenport as viewed from Credit Island across the Mississippi River.

The 2014 bicentennial of the Battle of Credit Island spurred renewed interest in the battlefield, including a research project to try to identify the location of fighting on the island.

Today, Credit Island is a 420-acre (1.7 km^{2}) community park under the jurisdiction of Davenport Parks and Recreation. It features a disc golf course and rugby, soccer, baseball, and softball fields. There are also picnic shelters, fishing spots, and a bicycle trail. Credit Island is the scene of many public events and is also popular for sight-seeing and eagle watching.

In May 2010, the city of Davenport received a grant from the State Historical Society of Iowa to conduct an archaeological study of one of the Mississippi River islands near the Iowa shoreline.

In 2012, construction began on a bridge on the west side of the island, linking the Mississippi River Trail bike path to Concord Street in Davenport.

On May 2, 2013, Credit Island Lodge caught fire. The lodge was restored in 2015.

== Other names for Credit Island ==
As seen on the 1838 map included on this page, Credit Island has been the official name of this island on government maps from the early years of Illinois statehood. However, as the island has changed hands and been developed and promoted as a site for entertainment through the years, other names have been attached to the island.

=== Offerman's Island: 1868 - 1903 ===
John and Dorothea Offerman had four sons in about 1868 when they moved from a farm between Slopertown Road and Harrison Street northwest of Davenport, IA and bought the island and renamed it Offerman's Island.

In 1894, the county land ownership maps still showed John Offerman as the owner of Credit Island.

The Mississippi River Commission's Survey of the Mississippi River maps show it called Offerman's Island, survey date August 7, 1895

Offerman's Island was part of the Rockingham Township in Scott County, Iowa, United States. Before the purchase it was also named Suburban Island, Grand Island, and Manhattan Island. In 1901, it was sold to Claus Kuehl for $22,500. In 1903, it was renamed The Grand Isle.

=== Suburban Island: 1904 - 1918? ===
The island was purchased in 1904 by private owners and renamed Suburban Island because of the railroad that ran to the island. It was used as a recreational spot for swimming and sports prior to World War I. The city of Davenport bought the island in 1918 and held a naming contest: Credit Island was the clear winner. A golf course eventually replaced the picnic grounds and swimming facilities.

In the 1890s, amusement parks opened up on Campbell's Island, Prospect Park and Black Hawk State Park on the Illinois side and Suburban Island and Schutzen Park on the Iowa side.

In 1918, the City of Davenport bought the island. Davenport Park Board meeting minutes started being documented in 1918 and no mention of the amusement park was made so it likely was gone by then.

The island also had a Figure 8 roller coaster from 1905 until an unknown date. The amusement park existed until at least 1917.
