= Battle of Tippecanoe order of battle =

The following units of the U.S. Army and state militia forces under Indiana Governor William Henry Harrison, fought against the Native American warriors of Tecumseh's Confederacy, led by Chief Tecumseh's brother, Tenskwatawa "The Prophet" at the battle of Tippecanoe on November 7, 1811.

== Abbreviations used ==
- w = wounded
- k = killed
- m = missing

== United States ==
Governor William Henry Harrison, Commander-in-Chief

- Second-in-Command - Acting Brig. Gen. John Parker Boyd
- Aide-de-camp - Col. Abraham Owen (k)

Headquarters

- Yellow Jackets - Capt. Spier Spencer (k)
- Spies and Guides - Capt. Toussaint Dubois

Brigade	Battalion	Companies
Infantry Brigade; Col. John Parker Boyd: George Croghan, aide-de-camp	Front Line 4th U.S. Infantry Maj. George Rogers Clark Floyd	Company of Capt. William C. Baen (Lt. Charles Larrabee); Company of Capt. Josiah Snelling; Company of Capt. George W. Prescott; Company of Capt. Return B. Brown; 7th Infantry Company of Lt. Jacob Allbright; Rifle Regiment Company of Lt. Abraham Hawkins
Infantry Brigade; Col. John Parker Boyd: George Croghan, aide-de-camp	Front Line Indiana Militia Lt. Col. Joseph Bartholomew (w)	Company of Capt. Thomas Scott; Company of Capt. Andrew Wilkins
Infantry Brigade; Col. John Parker Boyd: George Croghan, aide-de-camp	Rear Line 4th U.S. Infantry Capt. William C. Baen (mw)	Company of Capt. Robert C. Barton; Company of Capt. Joel Cook; Company of Lt. George Peters (w)
Infantry Brigade; Col. John Parker Boyd: George Croghan, aide-de-camp	Rear Line Indiana Militia Lt. Col. Luke Decker (w)	Company of Capt. Walter Wilson; Company of Capt. William Hargrove; Company of Capt. Jacob Warrick (k); Company of Capt. John Norris (w)
Cavalry	Dragoon Reserve Maj. Joseph Hamilton Daveiss(k)	Light Dragoons, Indiana Militia - Capt. Benjamin Parke; Light Dragoons, Indiana Militia - Capt. Charles Beggs; Light Dragoons, Indiana Militia - Capt. Peter Funk
Cavalry	Light Dragoons Maj. Samuel Wells	Kentucky Mounted Riflemen - Capt. Frederick Geiger (w); Mounted Riflemen - Capt. James Bigger; Indiana Mounted Riflemen - Capt. David Robb

== Tecumseh's Confederacy ==
Tenskwatawa (500-700 warriors)

- Wea - White Loon (Wawpawwawqua)
- Potawatomi - Winamac
- Miami - Stone Eater

Tenskwatawa had around 500 warriors available, although estimates range from 350 to 1,000.

- 125 Kickapoo under Mengoatowa (k)
- 125 Potawatomi under Waubonsie
- 125 Winnebago under Waweapakoosa
- Smaller units organized under Roundhead
  - Shawnee
  - Wyandot
  - Other tribes

== Sources ==
- Pirtle, Alfred. (1900). The Battle of Tippecanoe. Louisville: John P. Morton & Co./ Library Reprints. pp. 158. ISBN 978-0-7222-6509-3. "Pirtle, Alfred. (1900). The Battle of Tippecanoe." as read to the Filson Club.
- Tunnell, IV, H.D. (1998). To Compel with Armed Force: A Staff Ride Handbook for the Battle of Tippecanoe (PDF). Fort Leavenworth, KS: Combat Studies Institute, U.S. Army Command and General Staff College. Archived from the original (PDF) on September 16, 2012.
