= Sanford Ransdell =

- Born: September 11, 1781; Orange County, Virginia
- Died: July 30, 1854 (aged 72); Cumberland County, Illinois
- Resting place: Berry Cemetery in Toledo, Illinois
- Occupation: soldier
- Spouse: Rhoda Sampson (m. 1808)
- Children: 9
- Relatives: Edward Ransdell

Sanford Wesley Ransdell (September 11, 1781 – July 30, 1854) was an early American pioneer and soldier in the Battle of Tippecanoe. Ransdell was born in Orange County, Virginia, on September 11, 1781. He was a descendant of Edward Ransdell, a signer of the historic Leedstown Resolutions written up in defiance of the Stamp Act.

== Indiana Pioneer ==
By 1803, Ransdell was living in Mercer Co., Kentucky. Soon he emigrated to the frontier of the Indiana Territory, where he was an early pioneer. He met and subsequently married, around 1808, Rhoda Sampson, the daughter of William and Sarah (Coleman) Sampson in Harrison County, Indiana. William Sampson had served in the American Revolution with the Virginia troops. Their first child Frances Laura was born on March 15, 1809.

== Wartime service ==
On September 6, 1811, Ransdell enlisted as a mounted rifleman in a regiment known as the "Yellow Jackets".

At 4:45 am, November 7, 1811, Ransdell's regiment of eighty men, under the command of Spier Spencer, took part in the Battle of Tippecanoe at Tippecanoe Creek. This company occupied the right flank where according to General William Henry Harrison the fighting was, "excessively severe", and that the men of Ransdell's company, "bravely maintained their posts". Despite "having suffered so severely, and having originally maintained their posts".

During the fierce fighting two horses were shot dead from under Ransdell and his left thumb was shot off. The captain of the regiment, Spier Spencer, the first lieutenant Richard McMahan and the second lieutenant Thomas Berry were all killed in action. Ransdell was eventually mustered out at Corydon on November 24, 1811.

In a message sent to the U.S. House of Representatives, General Harrison had this to say about Ransdell's company: "With equal pride and pleasure, then, do I pronounce that, notwithstanding the regular troops behaved as well as men ever did, many of the militia companies were in no wise inferior to them. Of this number were the mounted riflemen, commanded by Captain Spencer. To them was committed the charge of defending the right flank of the army. That it could not have been committed to better hands, their keeping their ground (indeed gaining upon the enemy) for an hour and a half with unequal arms against superior numbers, and amid a carnage that might have made veterans tremble, is sufficient evidence."

A year later Ransdell participated in the War of 1812 and served as a first sergeant in the 5th Regiment Indiana Militia in Captain Jacob Zenor's Company from October 20 to November 18, 1812. For his actions on November 7, 1811, and his wartime service he would be awarded 40 acres (160,000 m^{2}) of land.

== Noah Beauchamp Affair ==
The Ransdells moved to Floyd County, Indiana, by 1820 and again later to Vigo County, Indiana. On March 15, 1827, their daughter Frances married Noah Beauchamp Jr., the son of the blacksmith Noah Beauchamp.

In 1840, Noah Beauchamp Sr. stabbed his neighbor George Mickelberry to death over a dispute. This famous incident culminated in a prolonged manhunt and trial that dragged both Ransdell and Rhoda into the witness box.

Ransdell witnessed the coroner's inquest regarding Mickelberry's death and was called to testify for the defense. Rhoda was also called to testify at the trial to verify that Mrs. Mickeberry had changed her story. Mrs. Mickelberry had previously stated various details to Rhoda and Elizabeth implying that if it had not been for Mickelberry's daughter Delilah Decker, by a previous marriage, the killing would not have taken place.

Ultimately, their testimony in favor of their daughter's father-in-law proved fruitless: Noah Beauchamp Sr., was hanged on December 30, 1842. The family continued to live in Vigo County with the notorious incident hanging about them for over a decade before eventually moving away to Cumberland County, Illinois.

== Last Years ==
The Ransdells had a total of nine children the last one Daniel was born in 1835 and would serve as a private in Company A. 7th Regiment of Illinois during the Civil War.

In 1854 both Sanford Ransdell and Rhoda died, Rhoda from an epidemic and Sanford, according to the coroner's jury, "came to his death by intoxication and oppressive heat from the sun", Sanford Ransdell died in Cumberland County, Illinois, on July 30, 1854. The two were buried side by side at Berry Cemetery in Toledo, Illinois.
