= Tecumseh's War =

1810–1813 conflict between the US and Tecumseh's confederacy

- Part of the American Indian Wars and the War of 1812
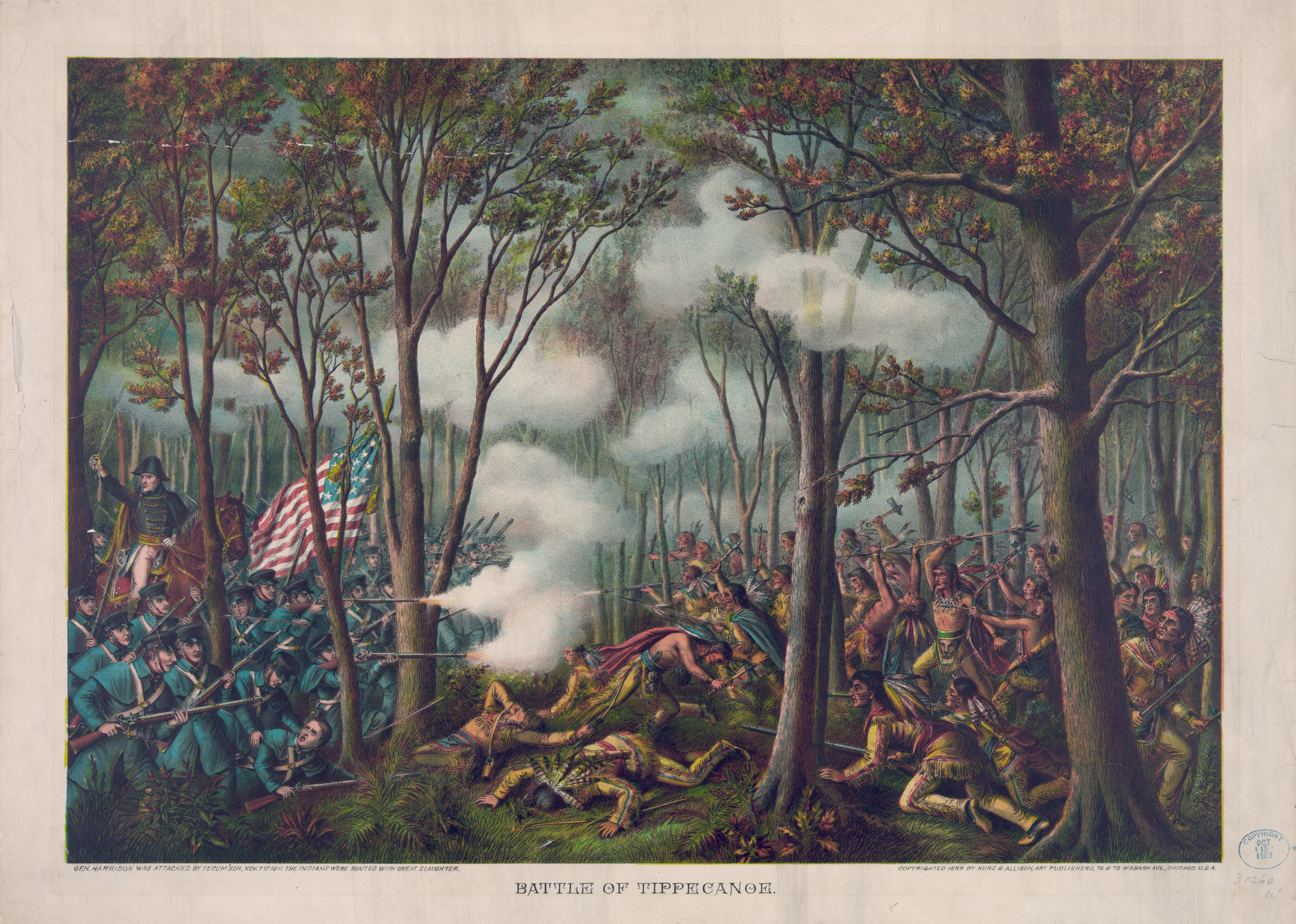
- Battle of Tippecanoe
Date	August 12, 1810 – October 5, 1813
Location	Midwestern United States, Upper Canada
Result	American victory: Dissolution of Tecumseh's confederacy

Belligerents
Tecumseh's confederacy United Kingdom (1812–1813)	United States

Commanders and leaders
Tecumseh †; Tenskwatawa; Roundhead # White Loon; Stone Eater; Waubonsie; Henry Procter; Isaac Brock (United Kingdom of Great Britain and Ireland) Robert Dickson (United Kingdom of Great Britain and Ireland) Matthew Elliott	James Madison; William Harrison; Thomas Horne; John Tipton; Richard Johnson (United States) Green Clay (United States) George Croghan (United States) William Dudley † (United States) John Miller; William Hull (surrendered)

Strength
~3,000 indigenous	Unknown

Casualties and losses
Total: 913–1,059; 116–168 killed 192–216 wounded 643 captured 29 missing 3 drowned	Total: 3,501–3,505; 263–264 killed 353–356 wounded 2,815 captured 70 missing

Tecumseh's War (Note: Also called Tecumseh's Rebellion.) was a conflict between the United States and Tecumseh's confederacy, led by the Shawnee leader Tecumseh in the Indiana Territory. Although the war is often considered to have climaxed with William Henry Harrison's victory at the Battle of Tippecanoe in 1811, Tecumseh's War essentially continued into the War of 1812 (during which Techumseh sided with the British) and is frequently considered a part of that larger struggle. The war lasted for two more years, until 1813, when Tecumseh died fighting Harrison's Army of the Northwest at the Battle of Moraviantown in Upper Canada, near present-day Chatham, Ontario, and his confederacy disintegrated. Tecumseh's War is viewed by some academic historians as the final conflict of a longer-term military struggle for control of the Great Lakes region of North America, encompassing a number of wars over several generations, referred to as the Sixty Years' War.

== Background ==
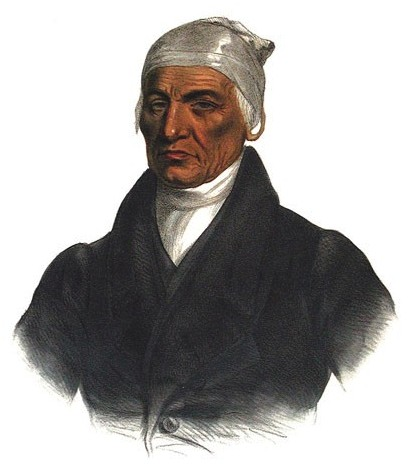
Shawnee Chief Black Hoof (Catecahassa) was a staunch opponent of Tecumseh's confederation and an ally of the United States in the War of 1812.

The two principal adversaries in the conflict, Tecumseh and William Henry Harrison, had both been junior participants in the Battle of Fallen Timbers at the close of the Northwest Indian War in 1794. Tecumseh was not among the signers of the Treaty of Greenville that ended that war and ceded much of present-day Ohio, long inhabited by the Shawnee and other Native Americans, to the United States. However, many Indian leaders in the region accepted the Greenville terms, and for the next ten years, pan-tribal resistance to American hegemony faded.

After the Treaty of Greenville, most of the Ohio Shawnee settled at the Shawnee village of Wapakoneta on the Auglaize River, where they were led by Black Hoof, a senior chief who had signed the treaty. Little Turtle, a war chief of the Miami, who had also participated in the earlier war and signed the Greenville Treaty, lived in his village on the Eel River. Both Black Hoof and Little Turtle urged cultural adaptation and accommodation with the United States.

The tribes of the region participated in several treaties, including the Treaty of Grouseland and the Treaty of Vincennes that gave and recognized American possession of most of southern Indiana. The treaties resulted in an easing of tensions by allowing settlers into Indiana and appeasing the Indians with reimbursement for the lands the settlers were inhabiting by squatting.

=== Religious revival ===
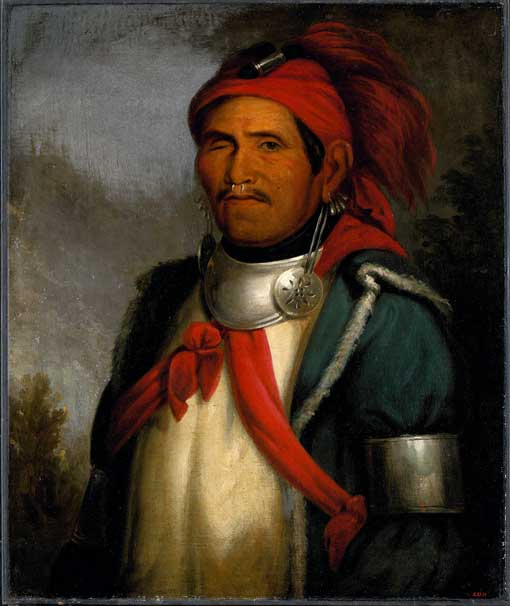
Tenskwatawa, by Charles Bird King

In May 1805, Lenape chief Buckongahelas, one of the most important native leaders in the region, died of either smallpox or influenza. The surrounding tribes believed his death was caused by a form of witchcraft, and a witch-hunt ensued, leading to the death of several suspected Lenape witches. The witch-hunts inspired a nativist religious revival led by Tecumseh's brother Tenskwatawa ("The Prophet"), who emerged in 1805 as a leader among the witch hunters. He quickly posed a threat to the influence of the accommodationist chiefs, to whom Buckongahelas had belonged.

As part of his religious teachings, Tenskwatawa urged Indians to reject European American ways, such as liquor, European-style clothing, and firearms. He also called for the tribes to refrain from ceding any more lands to the United States. Numerous Indians, who were inclined to cooperate with the United States, were accused of witchcraft, and some were executed by followers of Tenskwatawa. Black Hoof was accused in the witch-hunt but was not harmed. From his village near Greenville, Tenskwatawa compromised Black Hoof's friendly relationship with the United States, leading to rising tensions with settlers in the region. Black Hoof and other tribal leaders began to put pressure on Tenskwatawa and his followers to leave the area to prevent the situation from escalating.

By 1808, tensions with settlers and the Wapakoneta Shawnee compelled Tenskwatawa and Tecumseh to retreat further northwest and establish the village of Prophetstown near the confluence of the Wabash and Tippecanoe Rivers, land claimed by the Miami. Little Turtle told the Shawnee that they were unwelcome there, but the warnings were ignored. Tenskwatawa's religious teachings became more widely known as they became more militant, and he attracted Native American followers from many different nations, including Shawnee, Iroquois, Chickamauga, Meskwaki, Miami, Mingo, Ojibwe, Odawa, Kickapoo, Lenape, Mascouten, Potawatomi, Sauk, Tutelo, and Wyandot.

In 1808, Tecumseh began to be seen as a leader by his community. In 1808, the British in Canada approached him to form an alliance, but he refused. The Americans first took notice of him in 1810. Tecumseh eventually emerged as the leader of the confederation, but it was built upon a foundation established by the religious appeal of his younger brother.

Prophetstown came to be the largest Native American community in the Great Lakes region and served as an important cultural and religious center. It was an intertribal, religious stronghold along the Wabash River in Indiana for 3000 Native Americans; it was known as Prophetstown to the Americans. Led by Tenskwatawa initially, and later jointly with Tecumseh, thousands of Algonquin-speaking Indians gathered at Tippecanoe to gain spiritual strength.

=== Indiana Territory ===
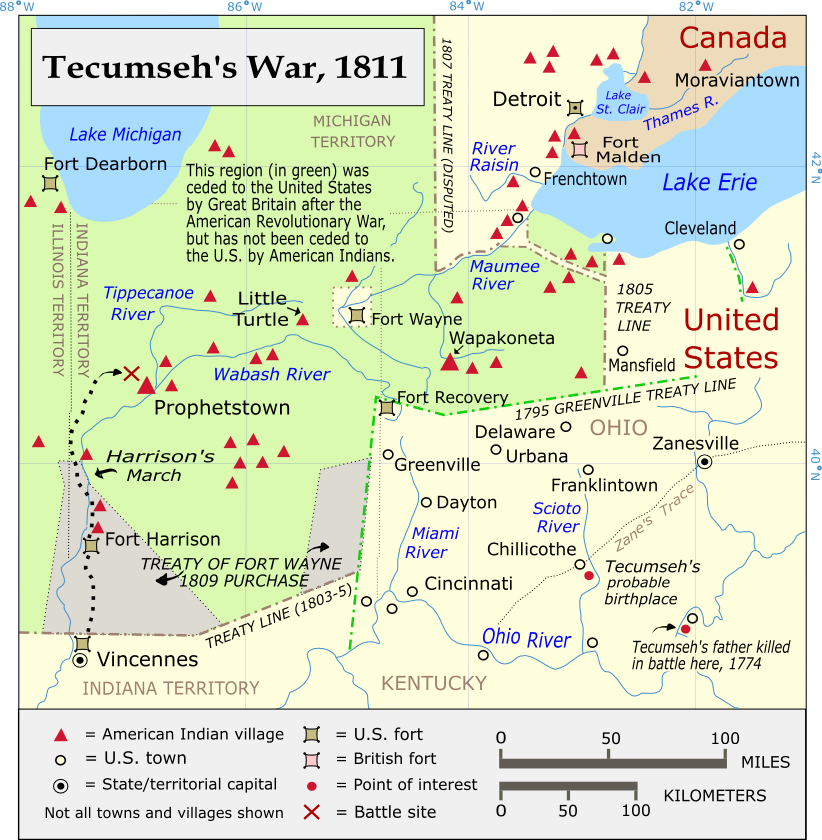

Meanwhile, in 1800, William Henry Harrison had become the governor of the newly formed Indiana Territory, with the capital at Vincennes. Harrison sought to secure title to Indian lands to allow for American expansion; in particular, he hoped that the Indiana Territory would attract enough settlers so as to qualify for statehood. Harrison negotiated numerous land cession treaties with American Indians.

In 1809, Harrison began to push for another treaty to open more land for settlement. The Miami, Wea, and Kickapoo were vehemently opposed to selling any more land around the Wabash River. To influence those groups to sell the land, Harrison decided, against the wishes of President James Madison, to first conclude a treaty with the tribes willing to sell and use them to help influence those who held out. In September 1809, he invited the Potawatomi, Lenape, Eel River, and Miami to a meeting in Fort Wayne. In the negotiations, Harrison promised large subsidies and payments to the tribes if they would cede the lands for which he was asking.

Only the Miami opposed the treaty; they presented their copy of the Treaty of Greenville and read the section that guaranteed their possession of the lands around the Wabash River. They then explained the history of the region and how they had invited other tribes to settle in their territory as friends. The Miami were concerned that the Wea leaders were not present, although they were the primary inhabitants of the land being sold. The Miami also wanted any new land sales to be paid for by the acre, and not by the tract. Harrison agreed to make the treaty's acceptance contingent on approval by the Wea and other tribes in the territory being purchased, but he refused to purchase land by the acre. He countered that it was better for the tribes to sell the land in tracts so as to prevent the Americans from only purchasing their best lands by the acre and leaving them only poor land on which to live.

After two weeks of negotiating, the Potawatomi leaders convinced the Miami to accept the treaty as reciprocity to the Potawatomi who had earlier accepted treaties less advantageous to them at the request of the Miami. Finally, the Treaty of Fort Wayne was signed on September 30, 1809, selling the United States over 3,000,000 acres (about 12,000 km^{2}), chiefly along the Wabash River north of Vincennes. During the winter, Harrison was able to obtain the acceptance of the Wea by offering them a large subsidy. The Kickapoo were closely allied with the Shawnee at Prophetstown, and Harrison feared they would be difficult to sway. He offered the Wea an increased subsidy if the Kickapoo would also accept the treaty, causing the Wea to pressure the Kickapoo leaders to accept. By the spring of 1810, Harrison had completed negotiations and the Treaty of Fort Wayne was finalized.

== Conflict ==
Tecumseh was outraged by the Treaty of Fort Wayne, and thereafter he emerged as a prominent political leader. Tecumseh revived an idea advocated in previous years by the Shawnee leader Blue Jacket and the Mohawk leader Joseph Brant, that American Indian land was owned in common by all tribes, and thus no land could be sold without agreement by all. Tecumseh knew that such "broad consensus was impossible", but that is why he supported the position. Not yet ready to confront the United States directly, Tecumseh's primary adversaries were initially the Native American leaders who had signed the treaty, and he threatened to kill them all.

Tecumseh began to expand on his brother's teachings that called for the tribes to return to their ancestral ways, and began to connect the teachings with the idea of a pan-tribal alliance. Tecumseh began to travel widely, urging warriors to abandon the accommodationist chiefs and to join the resistance at Prophetstown.

Harrison was impressed by Tecumseh and even referred to him in one letter as "one of those uncommon geniuses". Harrison thought that Tecumseh had the potential to create a strong empire if he went unchecked. Harrison suspected that he was behind attempts to start an uprising, and feared that if he were able to achieve a larger tribal federation, the British would take advantage of the situation to press their claims to the Northwest.

=== Confrontation at Grouseland ===
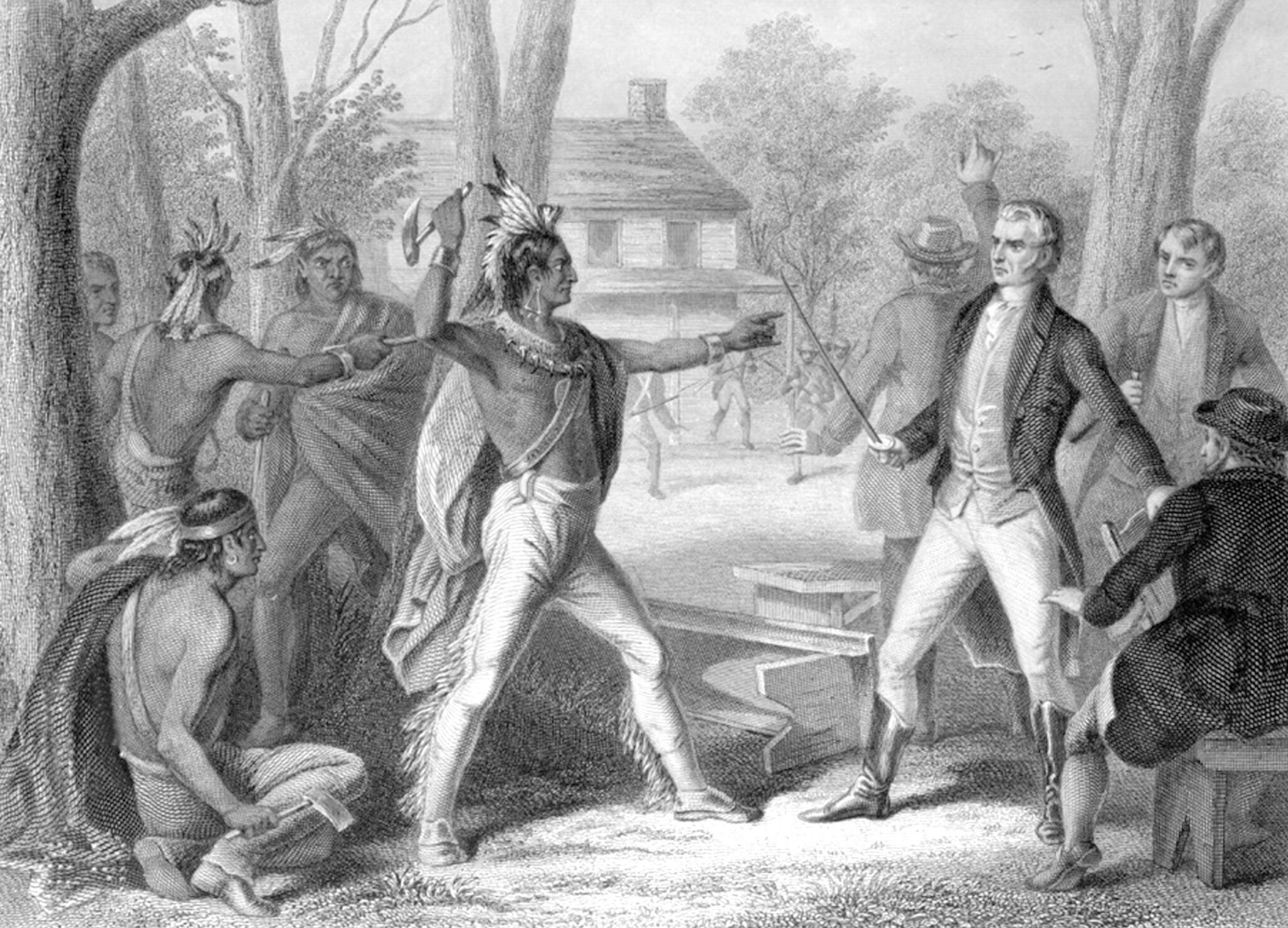
At Vincennes in 1810, Tecumseh lost his temper when William Henry Harrison refused to rescind the Treaty of Fort Wayne.

In August 1810, Tecumseh and 400 armed warriors traveled down the Wabash River to meet with Harrison in Vincennes. The warriors were all wearing war paint, and their sudden appearance at first frightened the soldiers at Vincennes. The leaders of the group were escorted to Grouseland, where they met Harrison. Tecumseh insisted that the Fort Wayne treaty was illegitimate. He asked Harrison to nullify it and warned that Americans should not attempt to settle the lands sold in the treaty. Tecumseh acknowledged to Harrison that he had threatened to kill the chiefs who signed the treaty if they carried out its terms, and that his confederation was rapidly growing. Harrison responded to Tecumseh that the Miami were the owners of the land and could sell it if they so chose. He also rejected Tecumseh's claim that all the Indians formed one nation, and insisted that each nation could have separate relations with the United States. As proof, Harrison told Tecumseh that the Great Spirit would have made all the tribes to speak one language if they were to be one nation.

Tecumseh launched an "impassioned rebuttal", but Harrison was unable to understand his language. A Shawnee who was friendly to Harrison cocked his pistol from the sidelines to alert Harrison that Tecumseh's speech was leading to trouble. Finally, an army lieutenant who could speak Tecumseh's language warned Harrison that he was encouraging the warriors with him to kill Harrison. Many of the warriors began to pull their weapons and Harrison pulled his sword. The entire town's population was only 1,000 and Tecumseh's men could have easily massacred the town, but once the few officers pulled their guns to defend Harrison, the warriors backed down. Chief Winnemac, who was friendly to Harrison, countered Tecumseh's arguments to the warriors and instructed them that because they had come in peace, they should return in peace and fight another day. Before leaving, Tecumseh informed Harrison that unless the treaty was nullified, he would seek an alliance with the British.

=== Rising tensions ===
Tensions continued to rise in the following year. Four settlers were murdered on the Missouri River, and in another incident, a boatload of supplies was seized by natives from a group of traders. Harrison summoned Tecumseh to Vincennes to explain the actions of his allies. In August 1811, Tecumseh met with Harrison at Vincennes, assuring him that the Shawnee brothers meant to remain at peace with the United States. Tecumseh then traveled to the south on a mission to recruit allies among the "Five Civilized Tribes". Most of the southern nations rejected his appeals, but a faction among the Creeks, who came to be known as the Red Sticks, answered his call to arms, leading to the Creek War, which also became a part of the War of 1812. Tecumseh delivered many passionate speeches and convinced many to join his cause.

Having heard from intelligence that Tecumseh was far away, Governor Harrison sent this report to the Department of War, concerning Vincennes's meeting, saying Tecumseh "is now upon the last round to put a finishing stroke upon his work. I hope, however, before his return that part of the work which he considered complete will be demolished and even its foundation rooted up". Thereafter he acted accordingly.

As tensions rose, Harrison openly denounced Tenskwatawa as a fraud and a fool, enraging him. Tecumseh ordered his brother to take no action, but his brother continued to call for the death of Harrison. Tenskwatawa lifted the ban on firearms and was able to quickly procure them in large quantities from the British in Canada. Tecumseh made a strategic error by leaving him alone to travel to the south. Tenskwatawa took his brother's absence as an opportunity to raise tensions even higher by further stirring up his followers.

=== Expedition to the Prophetstown ===
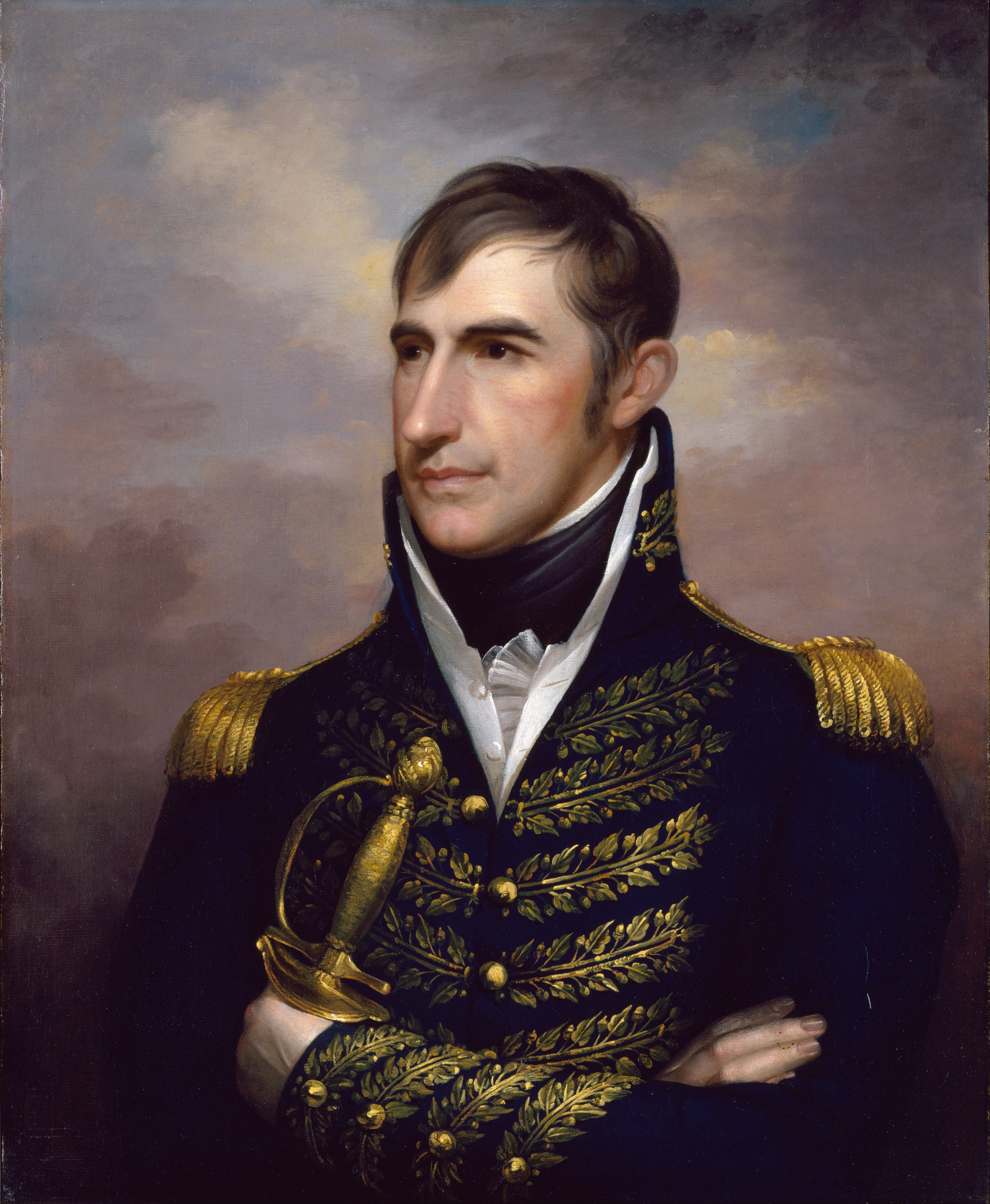
William Henry Harrison as painted by Rembrandt Peale in 1814.

While Tecumseh was still in the south, Governor Harrison marched his army north along the Wabash River from Vincennes with more than 1,000 men on an expedition to intimidate the Prophet and his followers. His stated goal was to force them to accept peace, but he acknowledged that he would launch a pre-emptive attack on the natives if they refused. His army stopped near present-day Terre Haute to construct Fort Harrison to guard an important position on the Wabash River. While at Fort Harrison, Harrison received orders from Secretary of War William Eustis authorizing him to use force if necessary to disperse the Indians at Prophetstown.

On November 6, 1811, Harrison's army arrived outside Prophetstown, and Tenskwatawa agreed to meet Harrison in a conference to be held the next day. Tenskwatawa, perhaps suspecting that Harrison intended to attack the village, decided to risk a pre-emptive strike, sending out about 500 of his warriors against the American encampment. Before the dawn of the next day, the Indians attacked, but Harrison's men held their ground, and the Indians withdrew from the village after the battle. Despite the surprise attack, the victorious Americans burned Prophetstown the following day and returned to Vincennes. This ordeal is known as the Battle of Tippecanoe.

== Aftermath ==
Harrison—and many subsequent historians—claimed that the Battle of Tippecanoe was a deathblow to Tecumseh's confederacy. Harrison, thereafter nicknamed "Tippecanoe", eventually became the President of the United States largely on the memory of this victory. The battle was a severe blow for Tenskwatawa, who lost prestige and the confidence of his brother. Although it was a significant setback, Tecumseh began to secretly rebuild the alliance upon his return from the south.

By December, most of the major American papers began to carry stories on the battle. Public outrage quickly grew and many Americans blamed the British for inciting the tribes to violence and supplying them with firearms. Andrew Jackson was among the forefront of men calling for war, claiming that Indians were "excited by secret British agents". Other western governors called for action; William Blount of Tennessee called on the government to "purge the camps of Indians of every Englishmen to be found..." Acting on popular sentiment, Congress passed resolutions condemning the British for interfering in American domestic affairs. Tippecanoe fueled the worsening tension with Britain, culminating in a declaration of war only a few months later.

As the Americans went to war with the British, Tecumseh found British allies in Canada. Canadians would subsequently remember Tecumseh as a defender of Canada, but his actions in the War of 1812—which would cost him his life—were a continuation of his efforts to secure Native American independence from outside dominance. Tecumseh continued the struggle until his death in the 1813 Battle of the Thames.

== Legacy ==
Tecumseth Street in Toronto takes his name.

== See also ==
- American Indian Wars
- Curse of Tippecanoe
- Indian Removal Act
- Indiana Territory in the War of 1812
- List of Indian massacres in North America
