= Treaty of Fort Wayne (1809) =

1809 treaty between the United States and Native Americans

- Type: Land Purchase
- Signed: September 30, 1809
- Location: Fort Wayne, Indiana Territory
- Condition: Transfer of money and goods to natives; Natives to allow American settlement of purchased land; Contingent on the later acceptance of the Kickapoo and Wea.
- Signatories: William Henry Harrison; Native leaders
- Parties: United States of America; Lenape; Potowatomi; Miami; The Eel River band of Miami; Weas (Signed November 1809); Kickapoo (Signed March 1810)
- Language: English

The Treaty of Fort Wayne, sometimes called the Ten O'clock Line Treaty or the Twelve Mile Line Treaty, is an 1809 treaty that obtained 29,719,530 acres of Native American land for the settlers of Illinois and Indiana. The negotiations primarily involved the Lenape (Delaware) but included other tribes as well. However, the negotiations excluded the Shawnee, who were minor inhabitants of the area and had previously been asked to leave by Miami War Chief Little Turtle. Territorial Governor William Henry Harrison negotiated the treaty with the tribes. The treaty led to a war with the United States begun by Shawnee leader Tecumseh and other dissenting tribesmen in what came to be called "Tecumseh's War".

== Parcels ==
The treaty has two nicknames in popular American culture: the "Ten O'clock Line Treaty of 1809" and the "Twelve Mile Line Treaty", both of which are associated with the disparate parcels of land defined by the treaty. The first nickname comes from tradition that says the Native Americans did not trust the surveyors' equipment, so a spear was thrown down at ten o'clock and the shadow became the treaty line. The Twelve Mile Line was a reference to the Greenville Treaty and the establishment of a new 'line' parallel to it but twelve miles further west.

== Negotiations ==
In 1809 Harrison began to push for a treaty to open more land for white American settlement. The Miami, Wea, and Kickapoo were "vehemently" opposed to selling any more land around the Wabash River. To motivate those groups to sell their land, Harrison decided, against the wishes of President James Madison, to first conclude a treaty with the tribes who were willing to sell and use those treaties to help influence those who held out. In September 1809, Harrison invited the Potawatomi, Lenape, Eel Rivers, and the Miami to a meeting in Fort Wayne. During the negotiations, Harrison promised large subsidies and direct payments to the tribes if they would cede the other lands under discussion.

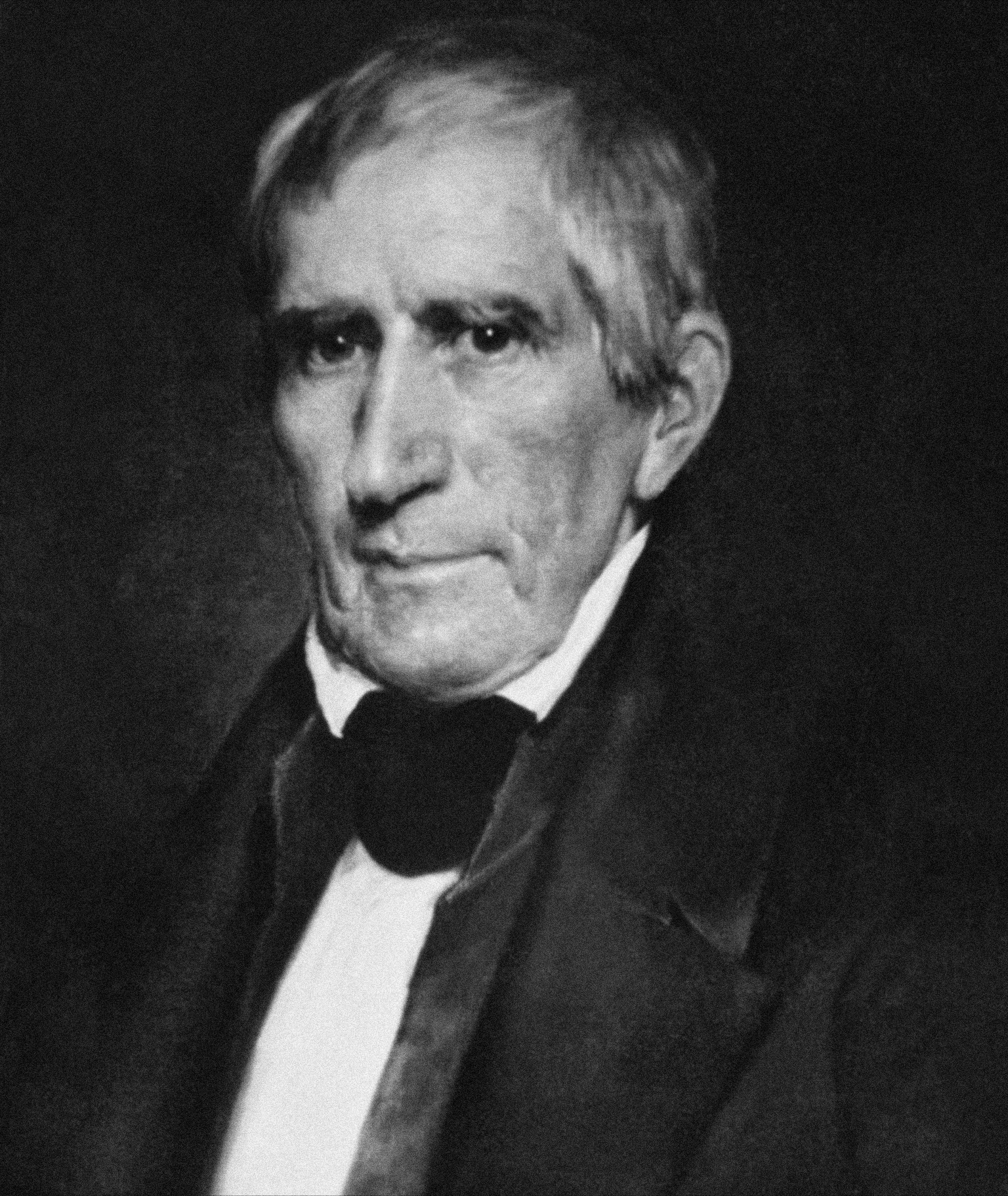
William Henry Harrison

Only the Miami opposed the treaty. They presented a copy of the Treaty of Greenville to highlight the section that guaranteed their possession of the lands around the Wabash River. They then explained the history of the region and how they had invited the Wea and other tribes to settle in their territory as friends. The Miami were concerned that the Wea leaders were not present at the negotiations even though they were the primary inhabitants of the land being sold. The Miami also wanted any new land sales to be paid for by the acre, and not by the tract. Harrison agreed to make the treaty's acceptance contingent on approval by the Wea and other tribes in the territory being purchased, but he refused to purchase land by the acre. He countered that it was better for the tribes to sell the land in tracts so as to prevent the Americans from only purchasing their best lands by the acre and leaving the tribes with only poor land on which to live.

After two weeks of negotiating, the Potawatomi leaders convinced the Miami to accept the treaty as reciprocity to the Potawatomi who had earlier accepted treaties less advantageous to their tribe at the request of the Miami. The Treaty of Fort Wayne was finally signed on September 29, 1809, selling the United States over 3,000,000 acres (approximately 12,000 km^{2}), mostly along the Wabash River north of Vincennes. With the help of Miami Chief Pacanne, who was influential with the Wea, Harrison later that winter was able to obtain the acceptance of the Wea by offering them a large subsidy. The Kickapoo were closely allied with the Shawnee at Prophetstown and Harrison feared they would be difficult to sway. He offered the Wea an increased subsidy if the Kickapoo would also accept the treaty, causing the Wea to pressure the Kickapoo leaders to accept, which they eventually did. By the spring of 1810, Harrison had completed negotiations and the treaty was finalized.

Harrison made much of his opposition to the sale or distribution of alcohol to Indians. On August 23, 1809, he issued a proclamation forbidding the distribution of alcohol to Indians within thirty miles of Vincennes. During the negotiation of the treaty, Harrison abandoned this principle. He had whiskey distributed to the Potawatomi, Lenape, and Miami negotiators in Fort Wayne on a large scale. The historian Robert M. Owens states that the 1390 Indians at Fort Wayne for the negotiations consumed 218 gallons of whiskey during September and October 1809.

== Aftermath ==
Tecumseh was the powerful leader of a breakaway Shawnee group living just north of the area covered in the treaty. He questioned the legality of the treaty stating that these Native leaders did not have the right to sign the treaty, and rightfully sell land that is held in common with other Native peoples. In August 1810, he led 400 armed warriors from several different tribes in traveling down the Wabash to meet with Harrison in Vincennes. Tecumseh insisted that the Fort Wayne treaty was illegitimate and asked Harrison to nullify it, ominously warning that Americans should not attempt to settle the lands sold in the treaty. Tecumseh acknowledged to Harrison that he had threatened to kill the chiefs who signed the treaty if they carried out its terms. Harrison responded to Tecumseh that the Miami were the owners of the land and could sell it if they so choose. In a move that further impacted American relations with the Indians, Harrison also rejected Tecumseh's claim that all the Indians formed one nation and that each nation could have separate negotiations with the United States.

Before leaving, Tecumseh informed Harrison that unless the treaty was nullified, he would seek an alliance with the British. The situation continued to escalate, eventually leading to the outbreak of hostilities between Tecumseh's followers and American settlers later that year. Tensions continued to rise, leading to the Battle of Tippecanoe during a period sometimes called Tecumseh's War. The episode and its aftermath played a major role in Harrison's successful 1840 campaign for the presidency.

== See also ==
- Indian removals in Indiana
- Indiana Territory#History
