= Noah Beauchamp =

- Born: February 24, 1785; Maryland, United States
- Died: December 30, 1842 (aged 57); Rockville, Indiana, United States
- Status: Executed by hanging
- Conviction: Murder
- Penalty: Death

Noah Beauchamp (February 24, 1785 – December 30, 1842) was a blacksmith and an Indiana pioneer. He served as a lieutenant of the Eleventh Indiana Territorial Regiment. Beauchamp was also the first person to be legally hanged in Parke County, Indiana, after murdering his neighbor, George Mickelberry, over a dispute.

== Early life ==
Noah Beauchamp was born in Maryland to Thomas and Sarah Adams Beauchamp. As an adult Noah was over six feet tall, burly and had a ruddy complexion. He was said to have been quick to anger and as a young man, Beauchamp had a disagreement with his father over the morality of slavery. The younger Beauchamp was very religious, a devout Baptist, and he was vehemently against slavery. His father, who owned slaves, may have disowned Noah, who soon left for Kentucky and then Ohio, where he may have met Elizabeth Adams who became his wife. His first child, Noah Beauchamp Jr., was born in Cincinnati, Ohio, on November 29, 1804.

By 1811, Beauchamp had moved with his family to Connersville Township in Fayette County in the Indiana Territory, where he set up a blacksmith shop. On December 14, 1812, Beauchamp purchased a tract of land in Fayette County and lived there until the 1820s, the family moved to Edgar County, Illinois. Noah was appointed a lieutenant of the Eleventh Indiana Territorial Regiment on April 29, 1814. The Eleventh regiment was one of the best organized of the Indiana regiments.

In an era where many whites would not deal with blacks, Noah and his wife Elizabeth sold a tract of land in Floyd Co., on September 11, 1828, to Caesar Findley. The Beauchamps resided in Illinois until the mid-1830s, when he relocated again to Indiana, this time to Vigo County.

== The murder ==
One of the neighboring families, in Sugar Creek Township, that abutted his farm was the Mickelberry family. George Mickelberry and Beauchamp became embroiled in a heated dispute over property boundaries, but the tension between the two families wasn't bad enough to prevent Mrs. Mickelberry from hiring Beauchamp's daughters to knit. It was after one of these knitting jobs, in July 1840, that a larger dispute took place, this time between the Mickelberry and Beauchamp women. The Mickelberry daughters were spreading the word around town that Beauchamp's daughters stole some left over wool from the job. Beauchamp heard the accusations and quickly became very angry over the claims. He decided to confront George Mickelberry about the charges.

Beauchamp began walking over to George Mickelberry's house and decided to stop and ask God for guidance. He stopped in a clearing, where meat had been prepared and where a large butcher's knife was left on a stump. After Beauchamp prayed, he decided to take the knife with him in case Mickelberry's farm hands were around to give him trouble. Instead, only Mickelberry answered the door when Beauchamp knocked. In the doorway, Beauchamp, in anger, began to berate Mickelberry over his daughters' behavior. One of the daughters was in the living room, and began talking back to Beauchamp. Becoming enraged, Beauchamp threatened the daughter saying, "If you was a man I'd cut you into laces," as he brandished the knife. At that point, Mickelberry put his hand on Beauchamp's shoulder and reflexively, Beauchamp plunged the knife into Mickelberry's chest. His breast bone cracking at the force of the blade, he died almost instantly.

In a panic, Beauchamp immediately ran from the house toward the Wabash River. There he stole a row boat and escaped. When the word got out that Beauchamp had killed George Mickelberry, a large manhunt began, searching all over Vigo County and the surrounding area, but Beauchamp was nowhere to be found. George Mickelberry's family grieved for their loss and Mickelberry was buried.

== Aftermath ==
In the meantime, Beauchamp had fled to Texas, where he borrowed money to open a blacksmith shop. He owed large debts and the son of one of the men who loaned him money saw the wanted poster in the local hotel that was brought down to Texas by a traveller in April 1841. Since Beauchamp had not thought to use an assumed name, it wasn't long before the lenders son and another man went looking to collect the $500 reward on the fugitive.

Beauchamp was quickly apprehended and the two men set out for a river to ship Beauchamp back to Indiana in custody. Before they made it to the river, Beauchamp broke free and overpowered one of the men. He made a run for it but was soon recaptured. Beauchamp was locked in one of the cabins on the boat as it made its way up river. Unknown to his captors, Beauchamp used the sheets of the bed to fashion a noose and tried to kill himself in the cabin, but was foiled when someone came to check on him.

In Vigo County, before Beauchamp's trial began in earnest, his lawyer got a change of venue to Parke County, since the case was so well known. His daughter-in-law's parents Sanford and Rhoda Ransdell testified for the defense but to no avail. After a lengthy trial Beauchamp was sentenced to death on September 8, 1842.

The gallows were constructed in Rockville, Indiana. On the morning of December 30, 1842, Beauchamp's old friend and minister, Reverend Newport, delivered a sermon outside of Beauchamp's jail cell window. Beauchamp had his last meal, said his goodbyes to his family and friends and was taken to the gallows, where a large contingent from Vigo County waited. When he was asked if he had any last words, Beauchamp said, "Goodbye," and he was hanged.

On November 7, 1825, Beauchamp's cousin, Jereboam O. Beauchamp, was also involved in a fatal stabbing, with parallels to Noah Beauchamp's case. Jereboam Beachamp fatally stabbed Colonel Solomon P. Sharp in a murder that became known as the Beauchamp–Sharp Tragedy. Jereboam Beauchamp, in an effort to defend the honor of his wife, killed Sharp in his own doorway with a knife. Just like Noah Beauchamp, this Beauchamp fled and a large manhunt took place. He was captured, tried to kill himself, was saved at the last minute, was tried and hanged.

Noah Beauchamp was a direct descendant of John Beauchamp (Plymouth Company), and the Quaker Ambrose Dixon, Dixon was Beauchamp's great-great-great-grandfather.

== Bibliography ==
- McCormack, Mike. "Lynchings create somber yuletide". Archived from the original on November 23, 2008.
- Beckwith, H.W. (1880). History of Vigo and Parke Counties, Together With Historic Notes on the Wabash Valley. Fayette Twp. pp. 449–450.
- Bradsby, Henry C. (1891). History of Vigo County, Indiana: with biographical selections. Chicago: S. B. Nelson & Co. pp. 561–563.
