= Yellow Jackets (Indiana) =

Harrison County Militia
- Active: 1801–1814
- Country: United States
- Branch: Territorial Militia
- Type: Mounted Rifle Company
- Role: Scouts
- Size: 60 men
- Nickname: Yellow Jackets
- Engagements: Battle of Tippecanoe

Commanders
- 1801–1809: Captain Spier Spencer

The Yellow Jackets were a mounted militia company from Harrison County in the Indiana Territory. The company numbered sixty men and officers and saw action as part of the expeditionary force dispatched to put down the American Indian uprising during Tecumseh's War. The company saw additional service as part of a larger militia force that operated during the War of 1812.

== Formation ==
In September 1811 John Gibson, secretary of the Indiana Territory, called out the militia in response to rising tensions with Native American tribes in the region. The Yellow Jackets were one such company to respond to the call. The company gained its name from the uniforms provided by the county for the men. The cuffs and fringes of their buckskins and wool coats were dyed a bright yellow.

The militia of Harrison County was organized into a company of sixty men commanded by Captain Spier Spencer, the county sheriff. Spencer was a veteran of at least forty prior engagements with Native Americans. The second in command was 1st Lieutenant Richard McMahan, a new settler living near Corydon. The company had four sergeants and four corporals, one of each from each township in the county. Among them was Pearse Chamberlain, Henry Batman, and William Pennington, the younger brother of Dennis Pennington the speaker of the territorial legislature. Dennis Pennington was also a member of the company, but was unable to join the expedition because he was overseeing the construction of the new county courthouse and had to attend a meeting of the legislature who were called into an emergency session. The company had eight ensigns including future U.S. Senator John Tipton. Tipton kept a detailed journal of the company's activities and it is from that source that most knowledge of the company is known. The company contained two musicians, Daniel Cline serving as a drummer and Isham Stroud as a fifer. Both boys were fifteen years old, the youngest men in the company. There were forty-three privates enlisted, including many of the prominent men in the county.

The privates were paid between $8 and $6.66 for the duration of their four-month enlistment. The officers were paid between $50 and $26. All the men were required to supply their own horses and were paid forty cents a day for their horses' fodder. The company first met at Harrison Mill on the western edge of the county. After camping there a night waiting for the entire force to come together the company set out to join the primary camp of the territorial militia.

== Tippecanoe expedition ==
On September 8 the company set out down the Buffalo Trace towards the capital in Vincennes. Traveling along the road they met up with other companies of infantry militia traveling by wagon who they accompanied the remainder of the journey. By the 16th they crossed the White River and met up with the main army commanded by Governor William Henry Harrison on the 18th. For the next twelve days the company remained in camp just north of Vincennes. On September 30 they received orders to march to Maria Creek with the rest of militia gathered in the camp to meet the army regulars already stationed near Maria Creek. Upon reaching their destination the Yellow Jackets were removed from the normal chain of command and moved to only answer to Harrison.

Harrison intended to use the company as scouts and foragers. He put them in a wide formation around the main body of the army where they kept watch for enemies and gathered wild game to bring back to the main army. The company was successful and was even able to find beehives and bring back ten gallons of honey. On October 3 the army reached the site of modern Terre Haute, a strategic location on the Wabash River. The company continued to scout the countryside and forage while the rest of the army constructed Fort Harrison. A small detachment of mounted men under the command of Lieutenant Thomas Berry was added the Yellow Jackets.

On October 10 a small group of Indians ambushed sentries at the fort, wounding a man. The Yellow Jackets quickly drew up around the fort preparing to drive off an attack, but it never materialized. On October 22 the company held elections for additional officers, and Tipton was promoted to Lieutenant. The army soon resumed its advance, and by the end of the month they had arrived in modern Vermillion County. On November 2 Harrison ordered the entire army to parade so he could inspect them. The entire force did so, except the Yellow Jackets, who were off foraging. Harrison threatened to demote all of their officers, but never carried through on the threat for fear they would desert.

On November 3 the army moved out again and the Yellow Jackets along with the dragoons were put out in a skirmishing formation in front of the army to clear any possible enemies. By November 6, they reached the village of Prophetstown, the center of the native resistance. That night the army camped on a hill near the edge of the settlement. The army was camped in a battle formation and the Yellow Jackets were placed on the far right flank. Early on the morning of November 7, the Indians in Prophetstown launched a preemptive strike on the army.

The attack took the army by surprise and the brunt of the attack came down on the right flank. Captain Spencer was among the first to be killed, being shot in each thigh. Governor Harrison later recorded his death in a dispatch to Washington. Of Spencer he said, "...Spencer was wounded in the head. He exhorted his men to fight valiantly. He was shot through both thighs and fell; still continuing to encourage them, he was raised up, and received a ball through his body, which put an immediate end to his existence..." Lieutenants McMahan and Berry were also soon wounded and killed. As the Yellow Jackets were quickly overwhelmed a reserve company of regulars came to reinforce their line and turned the tide. The battle lasted three hours before the Native forces withdrew. The Yellow Jackets suffered the highest casualties of the army, over 30%. Eleven were killed in the battle or died from wounds and thirteen wounded. The dead were buried in a mass grave on their campsite, but after the army withdrew, the Indians returned, dug up the graves and scattered their remains.

A few days after the battle, and successful conclusion of the campaign, the militia was released from duty and returned to their homes. The militia reached Corydon on November 27 and disbanded after seventy-four days campaigning. The town later constructed a memorial on the town square for the fallen soldiers in the battle.

== Gallery ==
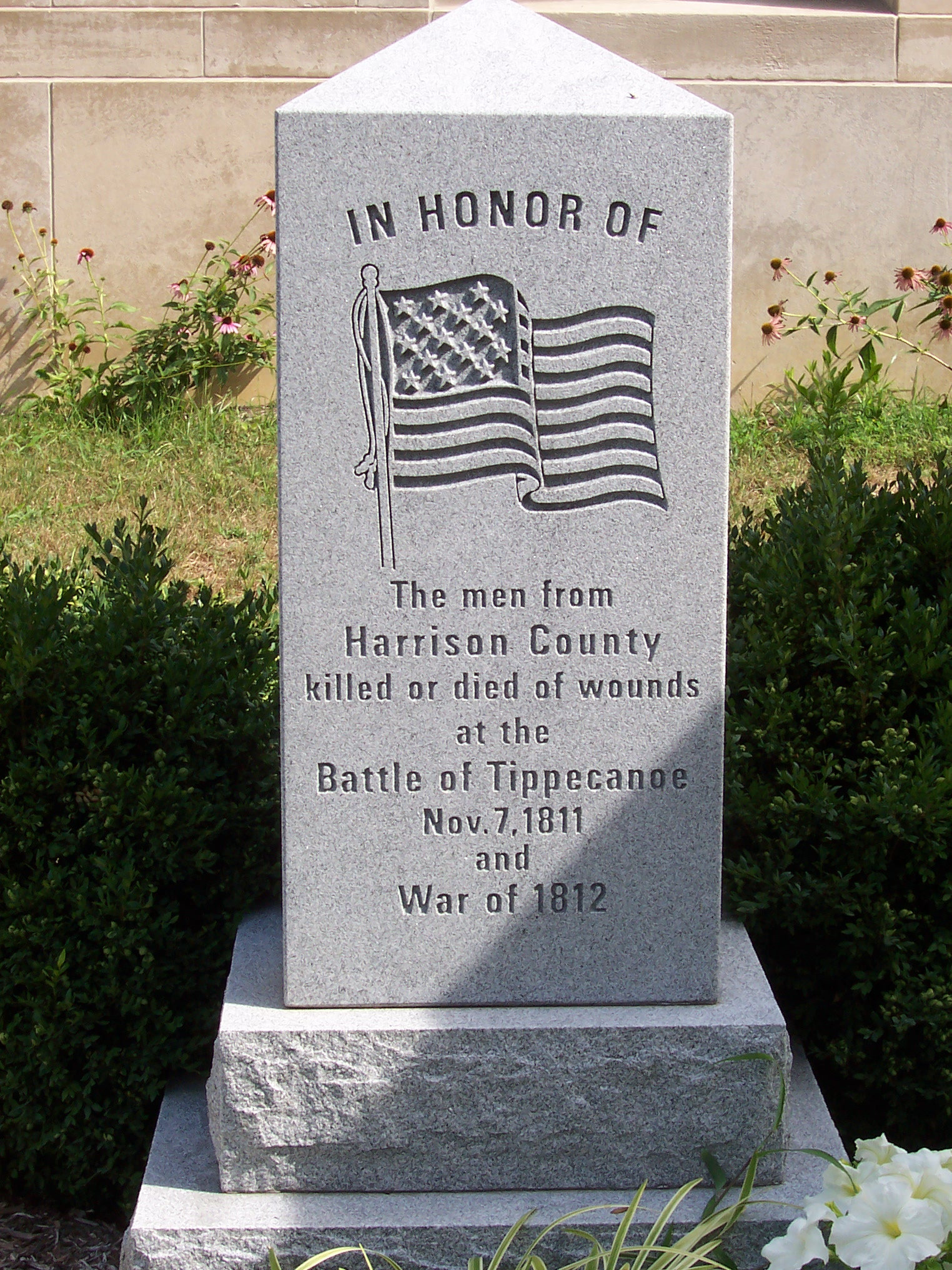

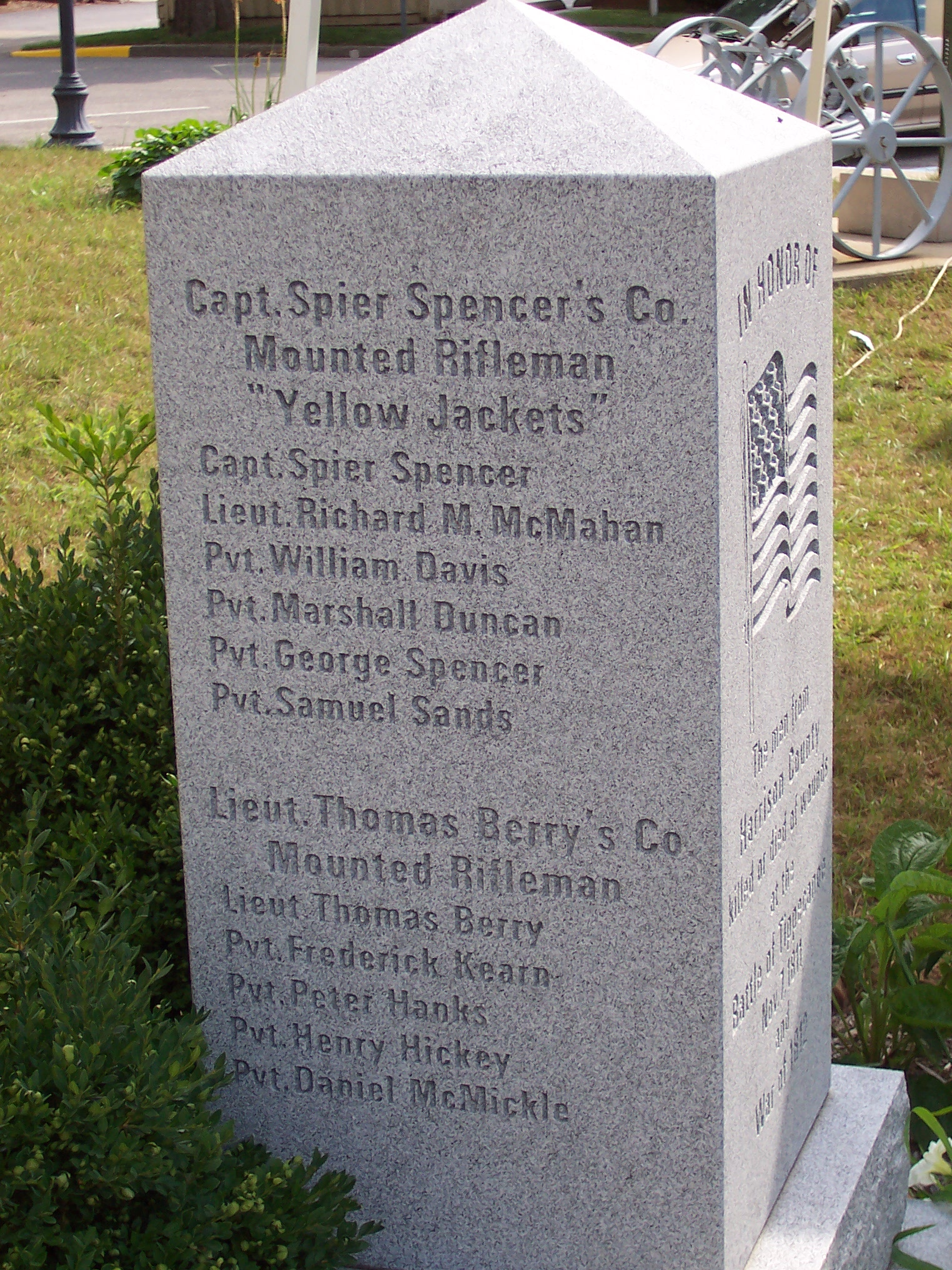

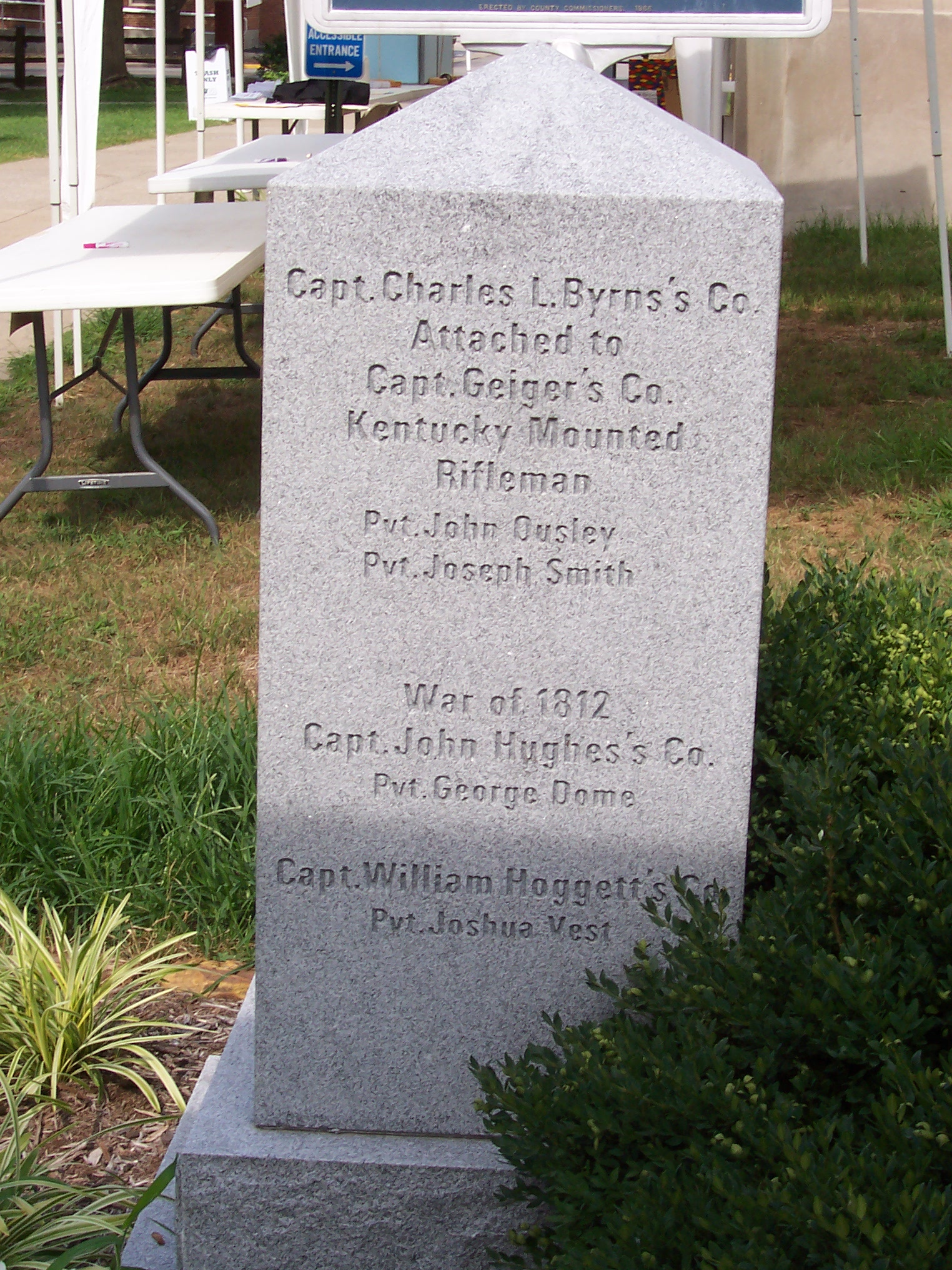

== Sources ==
- Funk, Arville L (1983) [1969]. A Sketchbook of Indiana History. Rochester, Indiana: Christian Book Press.
