= White Loon =

- Wapamangwa

Miami leader

Personal details
- Born: c. 1769
- Died: November 22, 1876, 107 years Roanoke, Indiana
- Relations: Little Turtle

Military service
- Battles/wars: Battle of Tippecanoe

White Loon (Wawpawwawqua or Wapamangwa) (c. 1769 – November 22, 1876), Michikinikwa's son-in law, was a Miami leader during Tecumseh's War and the War of 1812. He may also have been active in raids against the United States in years following the 1791 St. Clair's Defeat, repeatedly fighting against General "Mad" Anthony Wayne's troops, and, as "Wapamangwa", he signed the Greenville Treaty on August 3, 1795. He led warriors at the Battle of Tippecanoe, along with Wea chief Stone Eater and Potawatomi chief Winamac.

In an 1838 treaty between the Miami and the United States, White Loon was recognized as the owner of "one section of land, at the crossing of Longlois's creek, on the Ten mile reserve." White Loon cited the taxes he paid on this land as a basis for an exemption from the Treaty of 1840, which forcibly removed most of the Miami nation to a reservation in the Kansas Territory. White Loon first traveled to Kansas with the Miami, but returned to Indiana with Francis La Fontaine, Meaquah, Rivarre, and Coesse. The Indiana government supported White Loon's exemption, which was granted on the condition that he and his family would not receive the treaty-defined annuity payments if they remained in Indiana.

He died, 107 years old, at Roanoke, Huntington County, Indiana on November 22, 1876.
