= Stone Eater =

Stone Eater (Sanemamitch) was a Wea war chief in the 18th century, after the abandonment of Ouiantanon, in the present day U.S. state Indiana.

== Tecumseh confederacy ==
Stone Eater (a contemporary of P'koum-kwa, a.k.a. "Pacanne") joined the Tecumseh confederacy, and with Winamac and White Loon, led Native American forces at the Battle of Tippecanoe in 1811. He also led warriors at the 1812 Siege of Fort Harrison, and was an active participant in the War of 1812. Under the name Newa Shosa, he signed the armistice concluded in Detroit on October 14, 1813. On October 2, 1818, probably he signed, under the name Shamana, also the St. Mary's Treaty after Jacco's signature. Stone Eater was killed by another Wea warrior in 1822.
