= Spier Spencer =

American militia officer

Captain Spier Spencer (c. 1770 – November 7, 1811) was an Indiana militia officer who commanded a company of mounted riflemen known as the Yellow Jackets at the Battle of Tippecanoe. Spencer County, Indiana, Spencer, Indiana, and Spencer County, Kentucky are named in his honor.

== Biography ==
A native of Virginia, Spencer moved to Kentucky with his parents. He married Elizabeth Polk, daughter of the noted Indian fighter Capt. Charles Polk, in Bardstown, Nelson County, Kentucky on January 18, 1793. Spencer and his wife moved to Vincennes, Indiana. In 1809 Spencer was appointed by Governor William Henry Harrison as the first sheriff of Harrison County, Indiana. He moved his family to Corydon and served in that office until his death.

Spencer and his wife ran "The Green Leaf Tavern," in their large log home on Oak Street. Governor William Henry Harrison and Lieutenant Governor Ratliff Boon stayed there when they came on official business, as did delegates to the 1816 Indiana Constitution Convention.

When tensions grew high between the settlers and the Native Americans, Spencer organized the Harrison County Militia known as the "Yellow Jackets" because of the color of their uniforms, for a campaign against them. The Battle of Tippecanoe on November 7, 1811, ended with Captain Spencer being seriously wounded during the battle. He was shot in the head and both thighs. When he was being carried off the field he was killed instantly by another shot. Spencer's horse and sword were brought back from the battle and were returned to his widow.

The following account of the battle of Tippecanoe is taken from the official dispatch sent by General Harrison to the secretary of war, on the 18th of November, eleven days after the battle: "...Spencer was wounded in the head. He exhorted his men to fight valiantly. He was shot through both thighs and fell; still continuing to encourage them, he was raised up, and received a ball through his body, which put an immediate end to his existence..."

Captain Spencer's bravery and the heroics of his men were lauded by General Harrison. He is the namesake of counties in Indiana and Kentucky as well as the town of Spencer, Indiana, the seat of Owen County.

Spencer's widow continued operating The Green Leaf Tavern. When she married William Boone, she changed the name to the "Billy Boone Tavern". However, the marriage was short lived and she divorced Boone in 1829.
