= Tecumseh's confederacy =

19th-century Native American confederation

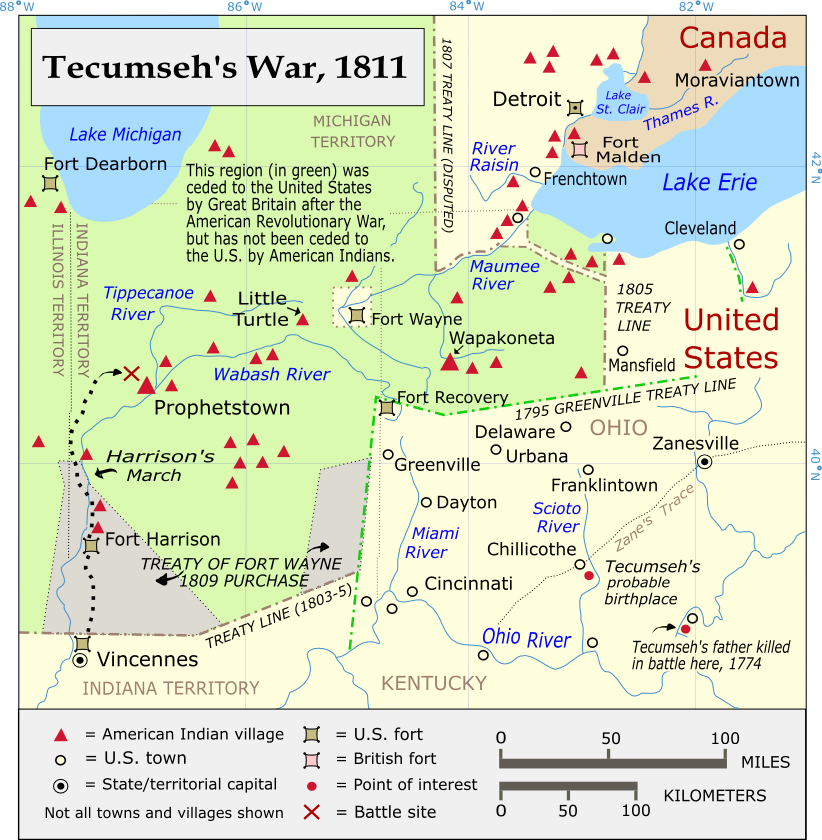
- Tecumseh's confederacy in 1810 (Note the Confederacy was an alliance of tribes rather than a territorial state with formal borders)
- Leaders: Tenskwatawa (1805–1808); Tecumseh (1808–1813); Tenskwatawa (1813–1824)
- Headquarters: Prophetstown
- Active regions: Northwest Territory; Upper Canada
- Ideology: Pan-Indianism; Anti-American expansionism; Indigenous religion as preached by Tenskwatawa; Communal ownership of land
- Wars: Tecumseh's War and the War of 1812

Tecumseh's confederacy was a confederation of Native Americans in the Great Lakes region of North America which formed during the early 19th century around the teaching of Shawnee leader Tenskwatawa. The confederation grew over several years and came to include several thousand Native American warriors. Shawnee leader Tecumseh, the brother of Tenskwatawa, became the leader of the confederation as early as 1808. Together, they worked to unite the various tribes against colonizers from the United States who had been crossing the Appalachian Mountains and occupying their traditional homelands.

In November 1811, a US Army force under the leadership of William Henry Harrison engaged Native American warriors associated with Tenskwatawa in the Battle of Tippecanoe, defeating them and engaging in several acts of destruction. In retaliation for that battle, Tecumseh led the confederation, allied with the British Empire, to war with the United States during a conflict later named Tecumseh's War, part of the War of 1812. However, the confederation fractured in 1813 following his death at the Battle of the Thames.

== Formation ==
Following the 1795 Treaty of Greenville, Native Americans in the Northwest Territory began to move out of the lands ceded to the United States. Many of the Natives, including the Lenape and Shawnee, moved westward at the invitation of the Miami people to settle in land considered part of Miami holdings. The tribes intermingled with one another, and most villages contained inhabitants of multiple tribes. Despite the individuals living amongst each other, they did not view themselves as a union of peoples. The dominant Miami inhabited much of modern central Indiana and the powerful Potawatomi tribe lived in northern Indiana and Michigan. The Wea and Kickapoo (both related to the Miami) and Piankeshaw inhabited a series of villages in western Indiana and eastern Illinois. The Piankeshaw later moved north, further integrating with the Wea and Kickapoo, following the 1803 Treaty of Vincennes. The Sauk, another powerful nation, lived in northern Illinois, to the west of the Miami.

The Shawnee, who had lost most of their territory during the Northwest Indian War, moved into northwestern Ohio and northeastern Indiana. The Lenape likewise had lost their territory and moved into south-central Indiana. Other tribes, including the Wyandot, Meskwaki, Ho-Chunk, Odawa, Mingo, Seneca, and others had a presence in the region's villages. Leadership was organized at the village level, and not tribal level, so in most cases, a leader represented members of multiple tribes who were living together in the same settlement. Leadership in the villages was likewise divided between war chiefs and civil chiefs. The civil chiefs negotiated the treaties and maintained outside relations, while the war chiefs took power in times of conflict. As the war chiefs, like Little Turtle, were removed from power following the war, that large confederacy of villages in the region began to fade and the civil chiefs urged their people to work with the United States in order to maintain peace.

=== Religious revival ===
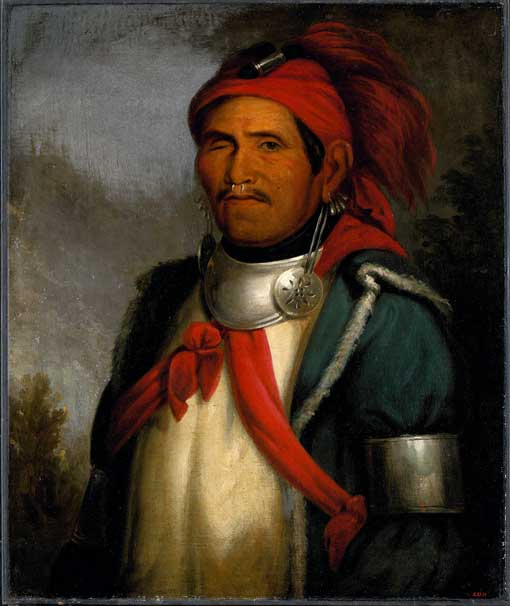
Tenskwatawa, by Charles Bird King

In May 1805, Lenape chief Buckongahelas, one of the most important native leaders in the region, died of either smallpox or influenza. The surrounding villages believed his death was caused by a form of witchcraft, and a witch-hunt ensued leading to the death of several suspected Lenape witches. The witch-hunts inspired a nativist religious revival led by Tecumseh's brother Tenskwatawa ("The Prophet") who emerged in 1805 as a leader among the witch hunters. His early popularity was fueled by the support of Blue Jacket, a prominent Shawnee war chief. Tenskwatawa's growing influence quickly posed a threat to the influence of the accommodationist chiefs, to whom Buckongahelas had belonged. The suspected witches included a Christian missionary who had been living among the Lenape, and all were tortured. One of the victims was partially burnt by fire forcing him to confess to sorcery and to name his supposed co-conspirators.

Tenskwatawa was influenced greatly by the teachings of Neolin and Scattamek, Lenape religious leaders who had died years earlier, and had predicted a coming apocalypse in which the white men would be overthrown by supernatural powers. As part of Tenskwatawa's religious teachings, he urged Indians to reject the ways of White Americans, such as liquor, European-style clothing, and firearms. He also called for the tribes to refrain from ceding any more lands to the United States. Numerous Indians—who were inclined to cooperate with the United States—were accused of witchcraft, and some were executed by followers of Tenskwatawa. Black Hoof was accused in the witch-hunt but was not harmed. From his village at Greenville, Tenskwatawa compromised Black Hoof's friendly relationship with the United States, leading to rising tensions with settlers in the region. He attracted a large number of followers, mostly Shawnee but some of his early followers were also Wyandot, Mingo, and Odawa. Black Hoof and other tribal leaders began to put pressure on Tenskwatawa and his followers to leave the area to prevent the situation from escalating into an open conflict.

They were invited to northwest Indiana by Potawatomi chief Winamac, who was also a religious leader calling for a return to many of the old ways, although he sought access to American agricultural technology. Tenskwatawa accepted the invitation and established the village of Prophetstown near the confluence of the Wabash and Tippecanoe Rivers, land claimed by the Miami. Little Turtle told the Shawnee that they were unwelcome there, but the warnings were ignored.

Tenskwatawa's religious teachings became increasingly militant following an 1807 treaty between the Americans, Meskwaki and Sauk. Many members of the two tribes were outraged by the treaty which caused the Sauk to lose their greatest settlement. Many of the disaffected came to align themselves with the Prophet and his teachings. The Piankeshaw and Kickapoo had also been adversely affected by treaties and migrated closer to Prophetstown. His growing popularity attracted Native American followers from many different tribes, including the Shawnee, Chickamauga, Tutelo, Ojibwe (Chippewa), Mascouten, and Potawatomi.

Willig (1997) argues that Tippecanoe was not only the largest Native American community in the Great Lakes region but served as a major center of Indian culture and final rampart defense against settlers. It was an intertribal, religious stronghold along the Wabash River in Indiana for three thousand Native Americans. Tippecanoe, known as Prophetstown to the Americans, served as a temporary barrier to settlers' westward movement. Led by Tenskwatawa and Tecumseh, thousands of Algonquin-speaking Indians gathered at Tippecanoe to gain spiritual strength. US government attempts, from the George Washington to William Henry Harrison administrations, to rid the area of the numerous Indian tribes eventually met with success as the Indians retreated westward by 1840 to avoid the large numbers of settlers entering their territory.

=== Rise of Tecumseh ===
By 1808, Tecumseh began to be seen as a leader by his community. He was outraged by the continued loss of land to the Americans and he began to travel around the southern Great Lakes region to visit village leaders and urge them to stop cooperating with the Americans and threatening to kill chiefs who continued to work with the Americans. Tecumseh had possibly as many as 5,000 warriors at his disposal scattered across the northwest.

In late 1808, British authorities in Canada approached him to form an alliance, but he refused. It was not until 1810 that the Americans first took notice of him. Tecumseh eventually emerged as the leader of the confederation, but it was built upon a foundation established by the religious appeal of his younger brother.

Quickly becoming the dominant Native American leader in the northwestern United States, Tecumseh turned his attention to the south. In 1811, he traveled to meet with leaders of the Five Civilized Tribes in the hope of uniting them with him in the confederacy in the north. With their help he believed they would be powerful enough to defy the Americans who would be forced to fight against them across the entire thousand-mile wide frontier. He was met with resistance and rejection, and only a fraction of the Creeks accepted his call to arms, leading to the later Creek War.

== Tecumseh's War ==
Tensions had already been rising rapidly, as people became aware of Tecumseh's war aims. While he was still in the south a preemptive strike was launched against Prophetstown, defeating his brother and a force of 500–700 warriors in the Battle of Tippecanoe. The defeat was a terrible blow for the confederacy, which never fully recovered.

Tecumseh returned and began to rebuild the confederacy. Allying with the British in Canada at the outbreak of the War of 1812, Tecumseh now had a supply of rifles, bullets and gunpowder. Tecumseh began a series of coordinated raids, attacking American posts in areas the British had ceded to the US. The Americans responded quickly and launched a second campaign, destroying Prophetstown a second time. The American frontiersmen had a grievance that motivated their demand for war in 1812.

Overall, Tecumseh's confederacy played a role in causing the War of 1812, and in early operations in the west. In August 1812, Tecumseh's warriors assisted a small force of 700 British regulars and Canadian militia in forcing the surrender of 2,500 American soldiers at the siege of Detroit. General William Hull, fearing a massacre, surrendered Fort Detroit without a fight to Major General Isaac Brock, who had engaged Tecumseh and his warriors as allies. Tecumseh's frontier war forced the Americans into rearguard actions, which divided their forces and prevented them from concentrating large enough numbers to successfully invade and occupy the strategically important area of Lower Canada (Quebec).

In 1813, the US Navy gained control of Lake Erie. The British and Tecumseh abandoned Detroit and retreated east, where they were caught and destroyed as a military force. Tecumseh was killed in the Battle of the Thames near Chatham, Ontario. The small British force was rapidly routed, leaving Tecumseh's 500 warriors (who refused to retreat further) to face a significantly superior American force, which included cavalry. The death of Tecumseh had a demoralizing effect on his allies and his confederacy dissolved as an organized entity soon after, although many tribes continued to fight under their own leaders, as they had before Tecumseh's death. After Tecumseh's death in 1813, his younger brother Tenskwatawa retained a small group of followers, but had no significant leadership position among the American Indians in the subsequent decade. In 1824, at the request of Lewis Cass, the governor of Michigan Territory, the aging Tenskwatawa returned to the United States from Canada to assist the federal government with its plans for the Shawnee removal west of the Mississippi River. Tenskwatawa hoped his involvement would allow him to regain some influence as a leader among the Shawnee.

== See also ==
- Indiana in the War of 1812
- Indiana Territory
- Western Confederacy, a pan-tribal union that resisted U.S. settlement in the Northwest Indian War (1785–1795)
