= Prophet's Town =

Native American village founded by Tecumseh and Tenskwatawa

Restored tallgrass prairie at Prophetstown State Park, near the site of Tecumseh and Tenskwatawa's confederacy village, photographed in 2026.

Prophet's Town or Prophetstown, also known as Tippecanoe (Miami-Illinois: Kiteephkwanonki, transl. "bigmouth buffalo town"), was a multiethnic Native American village near the confluence of the Tippecanoe River and the Wabash River in what is today Indiana. Founded in 1808 by the Shawnee prophet Tenskwatawa and his brother Tecumseh, the village was the headquarters of Tecumseh's confederacy, an Indigenous polity. The village was burned by William Henry Harrison following the American victory at the Battle of Tippecanoe.

== History ==
Tenskwatawa and Tecumseh were invited to northwest Indiana by Potawatomi chief Winamac, who was also a traditionalist religious leader. Tenskwatawa accepted the invitation and established the village of Prophetstown near the confluence of the Wabash and Tippecanoe Rivers, land claimed by the Miami people. Miami chief Little Turtle told the Shawnee that they were unwelcome there, but the warnings were ignored.

Tenskwatawa's religious teachings became increasingly militant following an 1807 treaty between the Americans, Meskwaki and Sauk. Many members of the two tribes were outraged by the treaty which caused the Sauk to lose their greatest settlement. Many of the disaffected came to align themselves with the Prophet and his teachings. The Piankeshaw and Kickapoo had also been adversely affected by treaties and migrated closer to Prophetstown. His growing popularity attracted Native American followers from many different tribes, including the Shawnee, Chickamauga, Tutelo, Ojibwe, Mascouten, and Potawatomi.

Willig (1997) argues that Tippecanoe was not only the largest Native American community in the Great Lakes region but served as a major center of Indian culture and final rampart against European settlers. It was an intertribal, religious stronghold along the Wabash River in Indiana for three thousand Native Americans. Tippecanoe, known as Prophetstown to the Europeans, served as a temporary barrier to settlers' westward movement. Led by Tenskwatawa and Tecumseh, thousands of Algonquin-speaking Indians gathered at Tippecanoe to gain spiritual strength. US government attempts, from the George Washington to William Henry Harrison administrations, to rid the area of the numerous Indian tribes eventually met with success as the Indians retreated westward by 1840 to avoid the large numbers of settlers entering their territory.

While Tecumseh was in the south meeting with the Five Civilized Tribes, the Americans under William Henry Harrison launched a preemptive strike against Prophetstown, defeating Tenskwatawa and a force of 500–700 warriors in the Battle of Tippecanoe. After the battle, Harrison sent a small group of men to inspect the Shawnee town and found it was deserted except for one elderly woman too sick to flee. The remainder of the defeated villagers had evacuated during the night. Harrison ordered the village burned, including 5,000 bushels of corn and beans in the storehouse.Langguth, A. J. (2006). Union 1812: The Americans Who Fought the Second War of Independence. New York: Simon & Schuster. p. 169. ISBN 978-0-7432-2618-9.Furthermore, he had the village cemetery dug up, with corpses left strewn about. After Harrison's troops departed the area, the villagers returned, digging up many of the American corpses and scattering the bodies in retaliation.

The defeat was a terrible blow for the confederacy, which never fully recovered. The village was partially rebuilt by the Shawnee, but eventually fully abandoned. Today, the site of Prophetstown is preserved as Prophetstown State Park.
