= Battle of Tippecanoe =

1811 battle of Tecumseh's War

- Part of American Indian Wars and Tecumseh's War
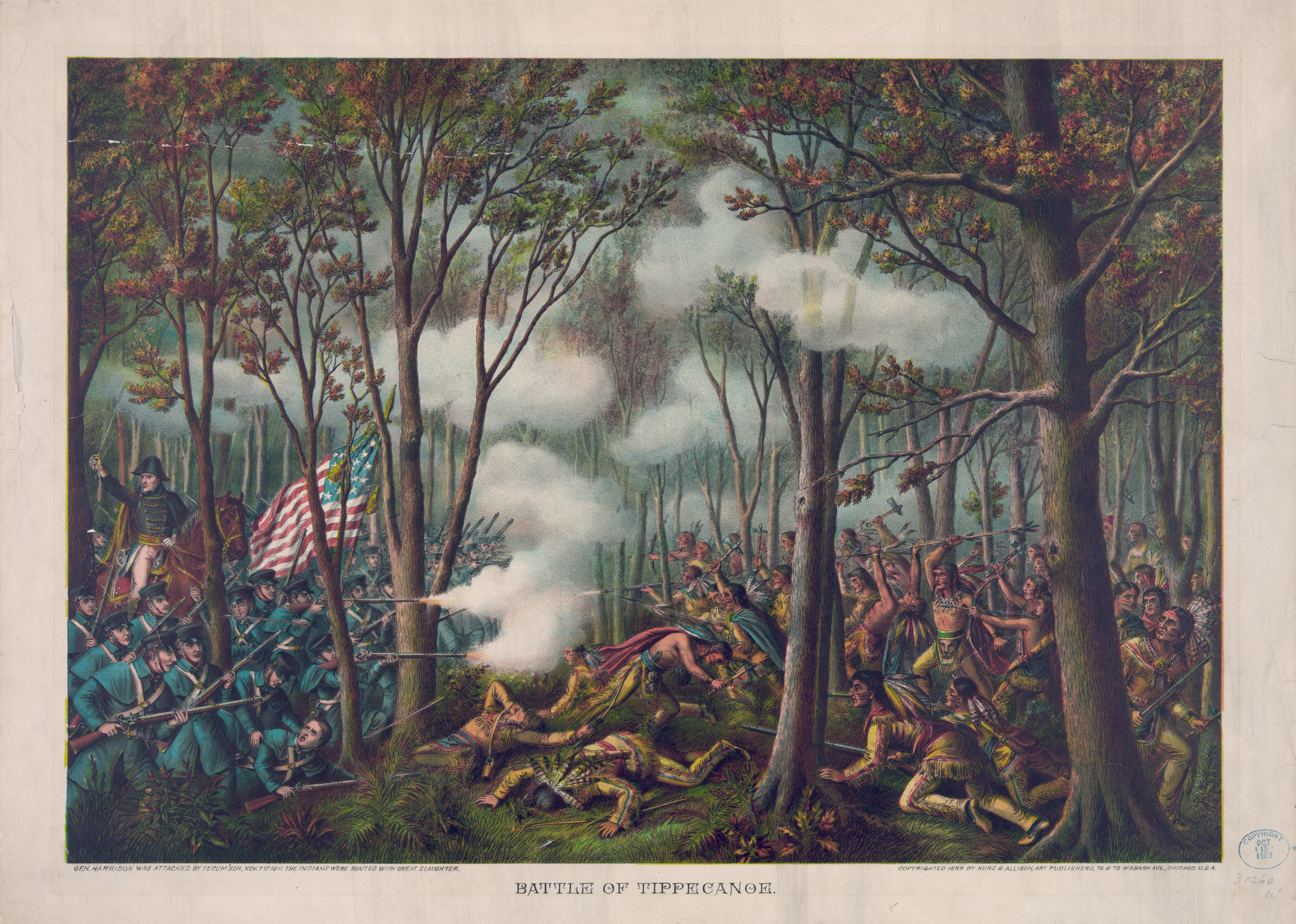
- 19th-century depiction: American troops under the leadership of General William Henry Harrison fighting the Indian forces of The Prophet, Tenskwatawa (the brother of Tecumseh) in a forest
Date	November 7, 1811
Location	Near Battle Ground, Indiana 40°30′25″N 86°50′38″W
Result	United States victory

Belligerents
Tecumseh's Confederacy	United States

Commanders and leaders
Tenskwatawa	William Henry Harrison

Strength
500–700 warriors	250 infantry, 90 cavalry, 700 militia

Casualties and losses
Unknown; 36 known dead (Estimated 50–65 killed and 70–80 wounded) + 1 POW	62 killed, 126 wounded
- Location within Indiana Battle of Tippecanoe (the United States)

The Battle of Tippecanoe (/ˌtɪpəkəˈnuː/ TIP-ə-kə-NOO) was fought on November 7, 1811, in Battle Ground, Indiana, between American forces led by then Governor William Henry Harrison of the Indiana Territory and tribal forces associated with Shawnee leader Tecumseh and his brother Tenskwatawa (commonly known as "The Prophet"), leaders of a confederacy of various tribes who opposed European-American settlement of the American frontier. As tensions and violence increased, Governor Harrison marched with an army of about 1,000 men to attack the confederacy's headquarters at Prophetstown, near the confluence of the Tippecanoe River and the Wabash River.

Tecumseh was not yet ready to oppose the United States by force and was away recruiting allies when Harrison's army arrived. Tenskwatawa was in charge of the Indian warriors during his brother's absence but he was a spiritual leader, not a military man. Harrison camped near Prophetstown on November 6 and arranged to meet with Tenskwatawa the following day. Early the next morning warriors from Prophetstown attacked Harrison's encampment. They took the army by surprise, but Harrison and his men stood their ground for more than two hours. After the battle, Harrison's men burned the abandoned village of Prophetstown to the ground, destroying the food supplies stored there for the winter. The soldiers then returned to their homes.

Harrison accomplished his goal of destroying Prophetstown, the win proved decisive and garnered Harrison the nickname of "Tippecanoe". Meanwhile, the defeat dealt a fatal blow for Tecumseh's confederacy and, though comeback attempts were made, it never fully recovered. So popular was Harrison's nickname that the Whigs turned "Tippecanoe and Tyler too" into the slogan and a popular song for Harrison and his running mate John Tyler's 1840 presidential campaign.

== Background ==
William Henry Harrison was appointed governor of the newly formed Indiana Territory in 1800, and he sought to secure title to the area for settlement. He negotiated land cession treaties with the Miami, Potawatomi, Lenape, and other tribes in which 3 million acres (approximately 12,000 km^{2}) were acquired by the United States at the Treaty of Fort Wayne, the second of such treaties after the earlier treaty of 1803.

The leader of the Shawnee, Tecumseh, opposed the 1809 Treaty of Fort Wayne. He believed that land was owned in common by all tribes; therefore specific parcels of lands could not be sold without full agreement from all the tribes. The previous generation Mohawk leader Joseph Brant advocated a similar philosophy and called for unification of tribes. Tecumseh's younger brother Tenskwatawa, known as the Prophet, was a spiritual leader among the northwestern tribes, advocating for a return to traditional ancestral ways. Though Tecumseh resisted the 1809 treaty, he was reluctant to confront the United States directly. He traveled through tribal lands, urging warriors to abandon their chiefs to join his effort, threatening to kill chiefs and warriors who adhered to the terms of the treaty, building a resistance at Prophetstown.

== Prelude ==
In 1810, Tecumseh and Governor Harrison met at Grouseland (Harrison's Vincennes home). Tecumseh demanded nullification of the treaty and the lands returned to the tribes. Harrison insisted each tribe had individual and separate arrangements with the United States, ridiculing the idea of common ownership of lands. Tecumseh stated his position clearly: he would serve the American loyally if the lands were returned; if not he would seek an alliance with the British. As early as 1810, British agents had sought to secure an alliance with Tecumseh, who was reluctant to ally with them because he recognized that they used the tribes to fight their wars on the frontier. Yet he travelled to Canada to meet with the British and Canadians in November 1810, after securing alliances with the Potawatomi and the Odawa as well as contacting the Iowa.

Tecumseh by Benson Lossing in 1848, based on an 1808 drawing

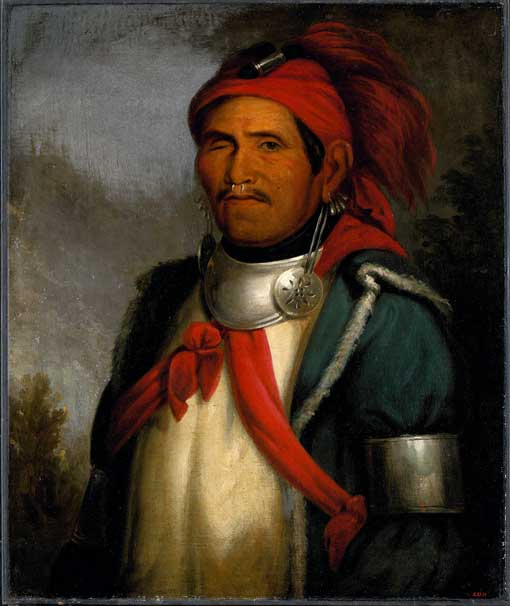
Tenskwatawa by Charles Bird King, ca. 1820

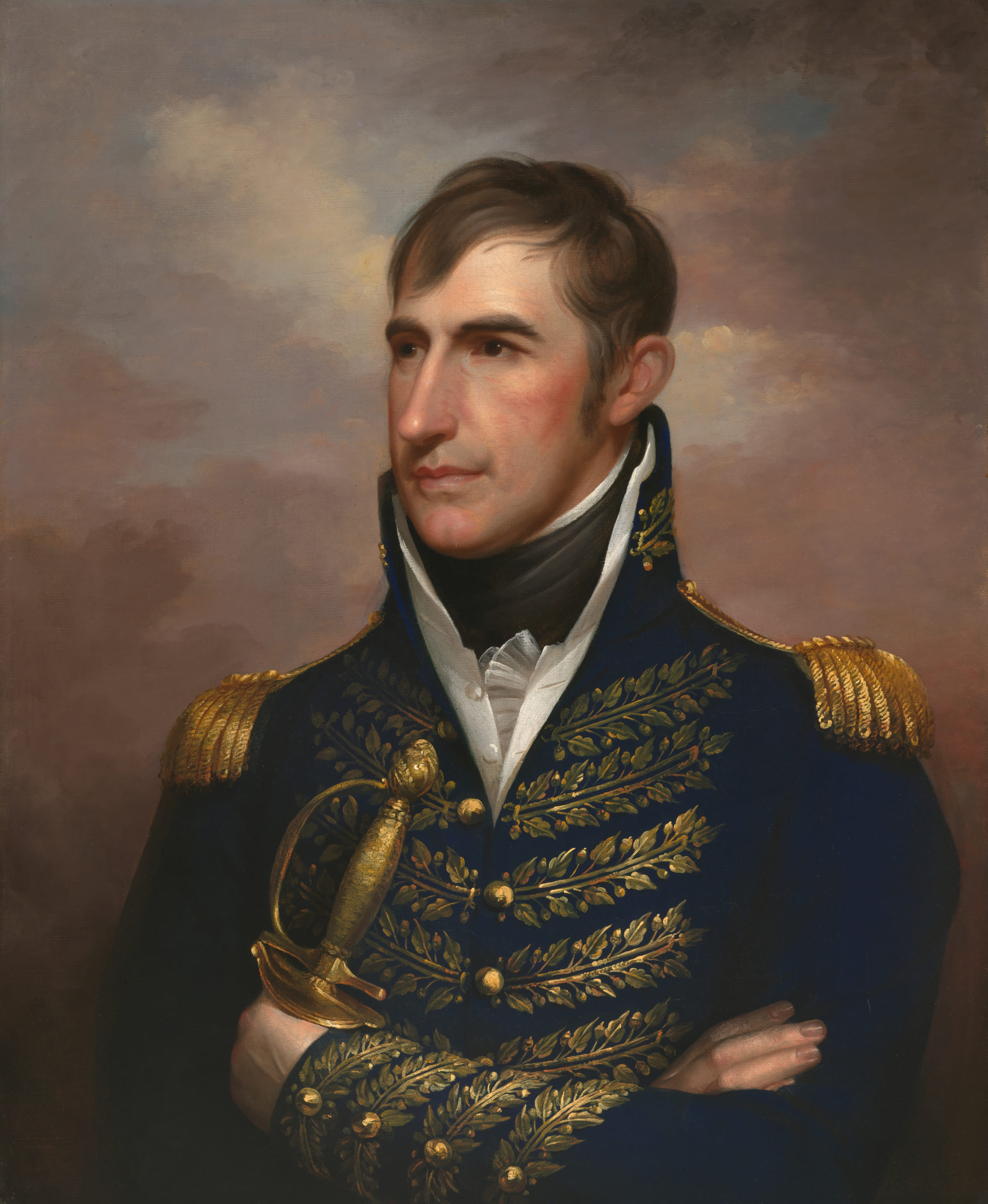
William Henry Harrison as painted by Rembrandt Peale in 1814

In the following year, Harrison blamed the Shawnee for the murder of a handful of men on the frontier and for the theft of a boatload of salt, but more importantly sent a stream of letters to Washington requesting permission to move against them. He wrote, "In Indian warfare there is no security but in offensive measures." He summoned Tecumseh to a meeting in the summer of 1811. As before, Tecumseh presented himself as an eloquent speaker but the meeting proved unproductive. Tecumseh informed Harrison he was leaving to recruit among the Muscogee and Choctaws and asked to wait upon his return to commence settlement on the disputed lands. He said he wanted "no mischief" during his absence, a plea he made to Harrison and Tenskwatawa.

Tenskwatawa stayed with the Shawnee who were camped at the Tippecanoe in Prophetstown, a settlement that had grown to a few hundred structures and a sizable population. At the time of the battle, he had around 500 warriors available, although estimates range from 350 to 1,000. The Kickapoo under Mengoatowa, Potawatomi under Waubonsie, and Ho-Chunk under Waweapakoosa were organized into large units of 125, with smaller units of Shawnee, Wyandot and other nations organized under Roundhead. Harrison thought that Tecumseh's warriors were "the finest light infantry troops in the world," and later wrote to Charles Scott that the confederation was better armed than most of his own force. In addition to muskets, knives, tomahawks, and clubs, Tecumseh's forces were armed with spears in order to repel bayonet charges, which the U.S. used effectively at the 1794 Battle of Fallen Timbers.

Tenskwatawa's defenders had a communication barrier. Most nations spoke an Iroquoian or Algonquin language, and many could speak multiple languages within those groups. The large Ho-Chunk force, however, spoke the Ho-Chunk language from the Siouan family, and required interpretation.

Harrison believed military force the only solution towards militant tribes. Secretary of War William Eustis sent orders to preserve peace with the Native Americans, but went on to say, "but if the Prophet should commence, or seriously threaten, hostilities he ought to be attacked." Harrison sent a series of letters to Tenskwatawa with a number of demands. He accused Tenskwatawa's followers of murdering whites in Illinois (almost certainly the work of Main Poc and his Potawatomi); ordered non-Shawnee residents banned from Prophetstown; and accused the Shawnee of horse theft. Tenskwatawa replied that the horses would be returned but failed to address the other demands. Harrison started raising troops. About 400 militia came from Indiana and 120 cavalry volunteers from Kentucky, led by Kentucky's U.S. District Attorney Joseph Hamilton Daveiss. There were 300 Army regulars commanded by Col. John Parker Boyd, and additional native scouts. All told he had about 1,000 troops.

Harrison gathered the scattered militia companies at Fort Knox (Note: "Fort Knox II", not Fort Knox in Kentucky) north of Vincennes. They reached Terre Haute, Indiana where they camped and built Fort Harrison. The month of October was spent constructing the fort, resupplying and training the troops. The Shawnee captured a group of Delaware chiefs traveling to Harrison, who had asked them to act as negotiators; after their release they arrived at the end of October with accounts of various aggressive actions. When a guard was shot outside the fort, Harrison considered it an aggressive action and reason for military retaliation against Prophetstown. He wrote to Eustis: "Nothing now remains but to chastise him [Tenskwatawa] and he shall certainly get it."

== Battle ==
Harrison's forces approached Prophetstown on November 6. He was to meet the next day with Tenskwatawa but believed negotiation futile. They made camp on Burnett's Creek, (Battleground, Indiana); the troops bedded down fully dressed and armed, based on Harrison's Aide-de-camp Bartholomew's advice.

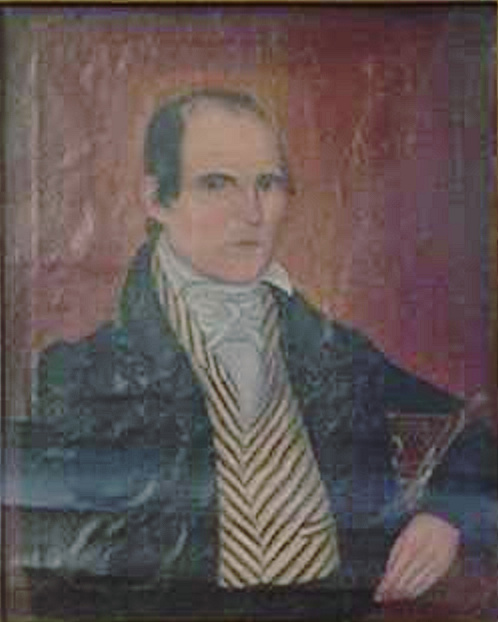
Joseph Bartholomew

Positioned in pickets according to battle lines, they kept blazing fires alight in the rain, which illuminated the camp. Harrison did not command fortifications erected. The perimeter was guarded by two companies of sentries. Captain Spier Spencer's Indiana Yellow Jacket riflemen, (known for their light-colored buckskins), was posted on the southern end of the camp perimeter. The rest of the militia established an irregular rectangular formation along the edges of the bluff surrounding the camp. Lieutenant Colonel Joseph Bartholomew commanded all infantry units guarding the front line. The regulars and dragoons were kept in reserve behind the main line, commanded by Major Floyd, Major Daveiss, and former congressman Captain Benjamin Parke.

Tenskwatawa told Michigan Governor Lewis Cass in 1816 that he did not order his warriors to attack Harrison, and he blamed the Ho-Chunk (Winnebago) warriors in his camp for launching the attack. Not long after the battle a Kickapoo chief told British Indian agent Matthew Elliot, that the shooting of two Ho-Chunk warriors by the sentries "aroused the indignation of the Indians and they determined to be revenged and accordingly commenced the attack." Tenskwatawa's followers were worried by the nearby army and feared an imminent attack. They had begun to fortify the town but had not completed their defenses. In council the night of November 6, Tenskwatawa seems to have agreed to a preemptive strike against the Americans, and to sending in a party under the cover of dark to murder Harrison in his tent. He assured the warriors that he would cast spells to prevent them from being harmed and to cause confusion among Harrison's army so that they would not resist. The warriors began to surround Harrison's army, looking for a way to enter the camp undetected. A man named Ben was a wagon driver traveling with Harrison's army, and he had deserted to the Shawnees during the expedition. He agreed to lead a group of warriors through the line to Harrison's tent during the late night hours, but he was captured by the camp sentries, taken back to camp, and bound. He was later convicted of treason, but Harrison pardoned him.

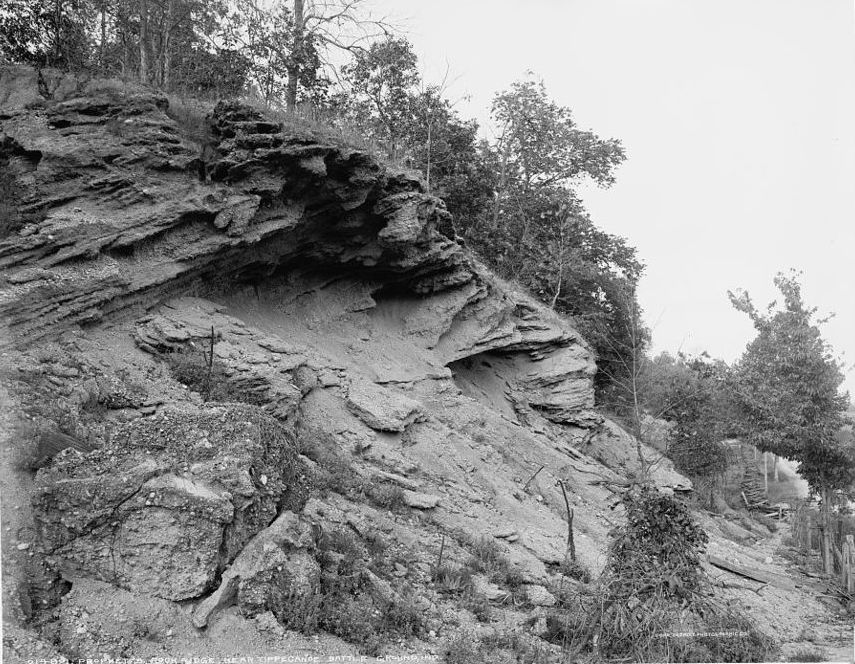
Prophet's Rock near the Tippecanoe battleground about 1902. Tenskwatawa is thought to have sung or chanted from this rock to exhort his warriors against Harrison's forces.

Accounts are unclear about how the battle began, but Harrison's sentinels encountered advancing warriors in the pre-dawn hours of November 7. Lieutenant Colonel Joseph Bartholomew was officer of the day, and he had ordered the troops to sleep with their weapons loaded. Around 4:30 a.m., the soldiers awoke to scattered gunshots, and found that they were nearly encircled by Tenskwatawa's forces. Contact was first made on the left flank of the perimeter, then to the front of the camp, the right flank and the rear. Captain Robert Barton's regulars and Captain Frederick Geiger's Kentucky militia faced immediate fierce attacks and were unable to hold their line. Harrison replaced them with the Indiana militia, commanded by Lieutenant Peters – their commander Wentworth died in the first attack. Harrison found the front line under fire (facing Prophetstown), pressed by warriors with rifles situated in a grove of trees. The Americans held their position as the attacks continued, the regulars reinforcing that critical section of the line. The militia's small-caliber rifles had little effect on the warriors as they rushed the defenders.

White Loon and Stone Eater were Tenskwatawa's war chiefs. The Prophet situated himself on a small hill overlooking the battle. The element of surprise was lost at the start of the battle, forcing the warriors to attack in a disorganized and uncoordinated fashion, with numerous small assaults. They reorganized and rushed the Americans whenever Harrison's troops drove them off. Meanwhile, warriors with rifles crawled on their stomachs from the woods towards the line.

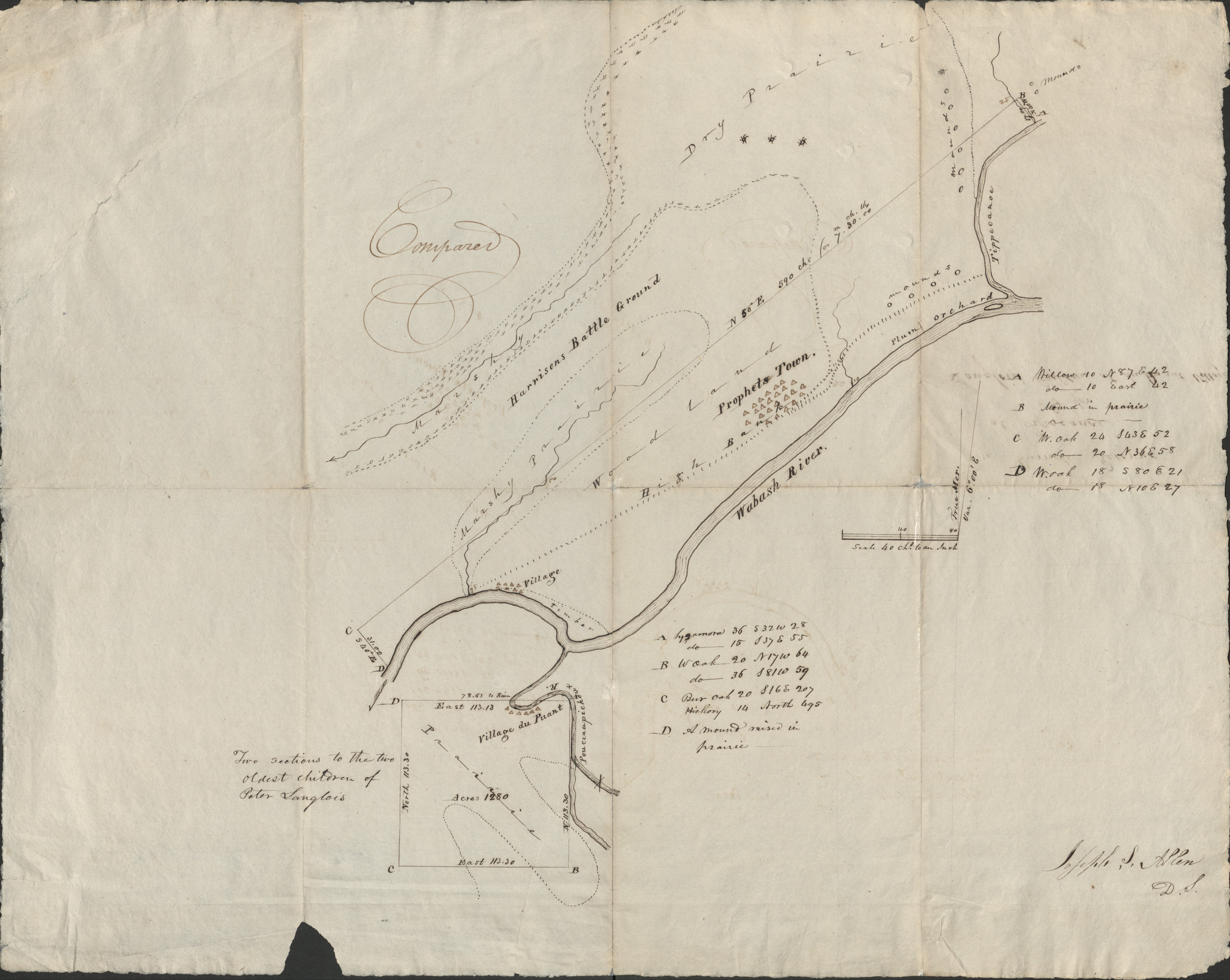
A map included in the Treaty of Prophetstown and Site of Battle of Tippecanoe, 1819

On the northern end of the camp, Major Daveiss led the dragoons on a counter-charge. Most of Daveiss' company subsequently retreated to Harrison's main line following the charge, but Daveiss was killed. The grove was cleared by the 4th regiment regulars. To the rear, the attack was the strongest. The Indiana Yellow Jackets were under heavy fire, unable to hold their line, their commander, Captain Spencer, dead. His death is documented in Harrison's November 18, 1811 dispatch to Eustis: "Spencer was wounded in the head. He exhorted his men to fight valiantly. He was shot through both thighs and fell; still continuing to encourage them, he was raised up, and received a ball through his body, which put an immediate end to his existence." Harrison moved two reserve companies under the command of Captain Robb to join Spencer's only living officer, ensign John Tipton, and they sealed the breach in the line. Throughout the next hour, Harrison's troops fought off several more charges. The warriors began to run low on ammunition; the rising sun revealed the dwindling size of Tenskwatawa's forces who quickly dispersed into the woods. Harrison's troops pursued. They discovered the bodies of 36 warriors in the woods, scalping them.

The battle lasted about two hours and Harrison sustained 188 casualties: 37 died in action, 25 were mortally wounded. Another 126 sustained less serious wounds. The Yellow Jackets suffered the highest casualties of the battle, with all but one officer killed. The number of Native American casualties is still the subject of debate, but it was certainly lower than that of the American forces. Historians estimate that as many as 50 were killed and about 70 to 80 were wounded. The warriors retreated to Prophetstown where, according to one chief's account, they confronted Tenskwatawa, accusing him of deceit because of the many deaths, which his spells were supposed to have prevented. He blamed his wife for desecrating his magic medicine and offered to cast a new spell; he insisted that the warriors launch a second attack, but they refused.

The following day, November 8, Harrison sent a small group of men to inspect the Shawnee town and found it was deserted except for one elderly woman too sick to flee. The remainder of the defeated villagers had evacuated during the night. Harrison ordered the village burned, including 5,000 bushels of corn and beans in the storehouse. Furthermore, he had the village cemetery dug up, with corpses left strewn about. After Harrison's troops departed the area, the villagers returned, digging up many of the American corpses and scattering the bodies in retaliation.

== Aftermath ==
The day after the battle, the American wounded were loaded onto wagons and brought back to Vincennes. They arrived at Fort Harrison about six days later. They boarded boats for the return to Vincennes on the river, arriving on November 18, at which point the militia was released home. Harrison informed Eustis of a battle near the Tippecanoe River, giving extensive details. Eustis replied with a note demanding to know why Harrison had not taken adequate precautions in fortifying his camp. Harrison replied that he had considered the position strong enough without fortification.

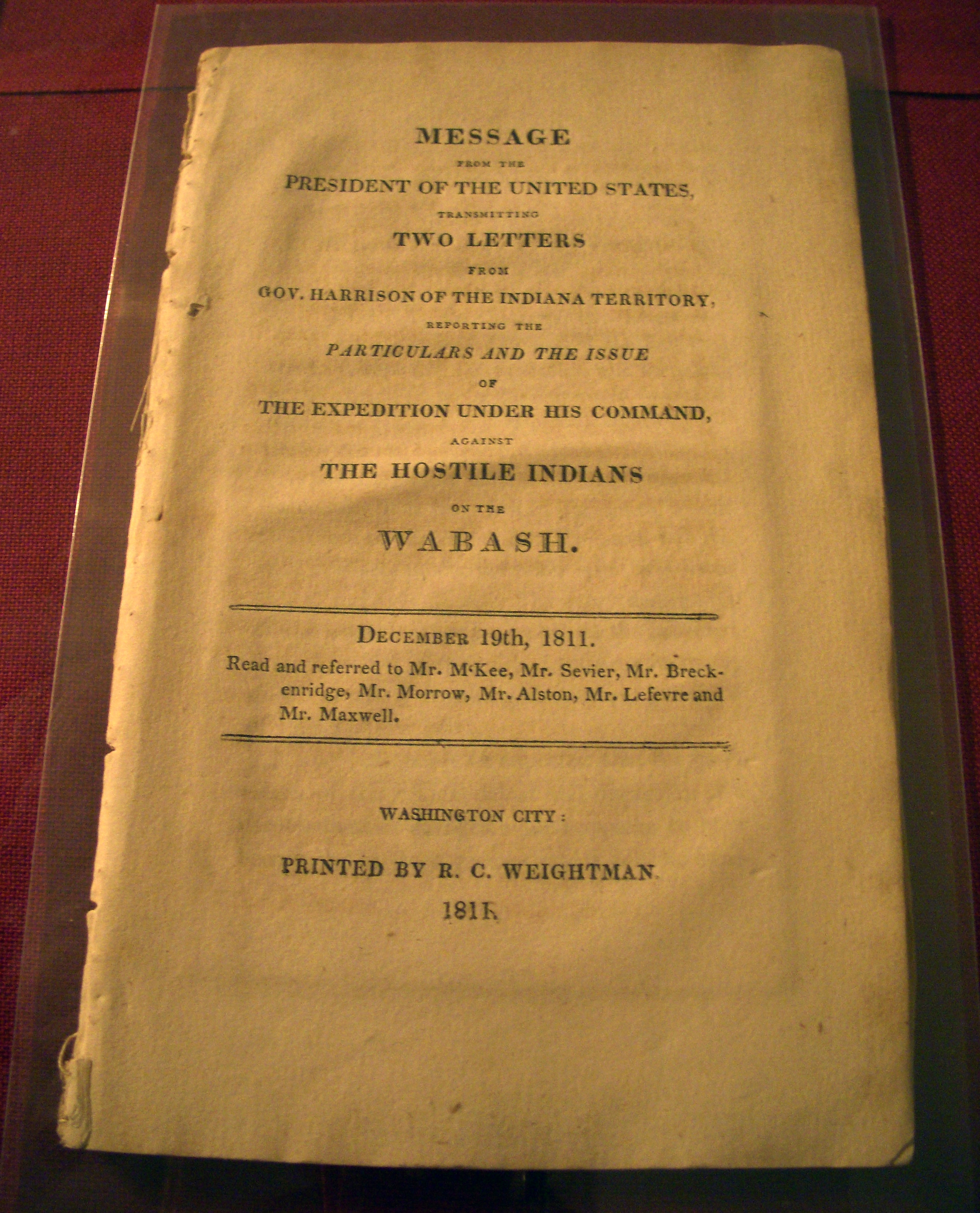
Document released to the public after the battle, containing letters from Harrison.

At first, newspapers carried little information about the battle, as they were focused on the highlights of the on-going Napoleonic Wars in Europe. An Ohio newspaper printed a copy of dispatches from Kentucky and characterized the battle as a defeat for the United States. Shocked at the loss of Daveiss, well-known and liked, Kentucky papers criticized Harrison and one ran a front page lament for Daveiss. When the story was picked up in the east it was critical of Harrison, the Long Island Star writing, "Governor Harrison's account with the Indians, in general, is not very satisfying."

Historians have long believed that Tecumseh was furious with Tenskwatawa for losing the battle, and that Tecumseh had threatened to kill his brother for making the attack. Tenskwatawa lost prestige after the battle and no longer served as a leader of the confederacy. In their subsequent meetings with Harrison, several Native Americans leaders claimed that Tenskwatawa's influence was destroyed; some accounts said that he was being persecuted by other leaders. The situation was more nuanced according to historians Alfred A. Cave and Robert Owens who explain the Native Americans were trying to mislead Harrison in an attempt to calm the situation, and that Tenskwatawa continued to play an important role in the confederacy.

Harrison claimed that he had won a decisive victory, but some modern historians raise doubts. "In none of the [contemporaneous] reports from Indian agents, traders, and public officials on the aftermath of Tippecanoe can we find confirmation of the claim that Harrison had won a decisive victory", according to Alfred Cave. The defeat was a setback for Tecumseh's confederacy, although they rebuilt Prophetstown, and native violence increased on the frontier after the battle. Adam Jortner says that the battle was a disaster for both sides, except in strengthening Tenskwatawa's religious movement.

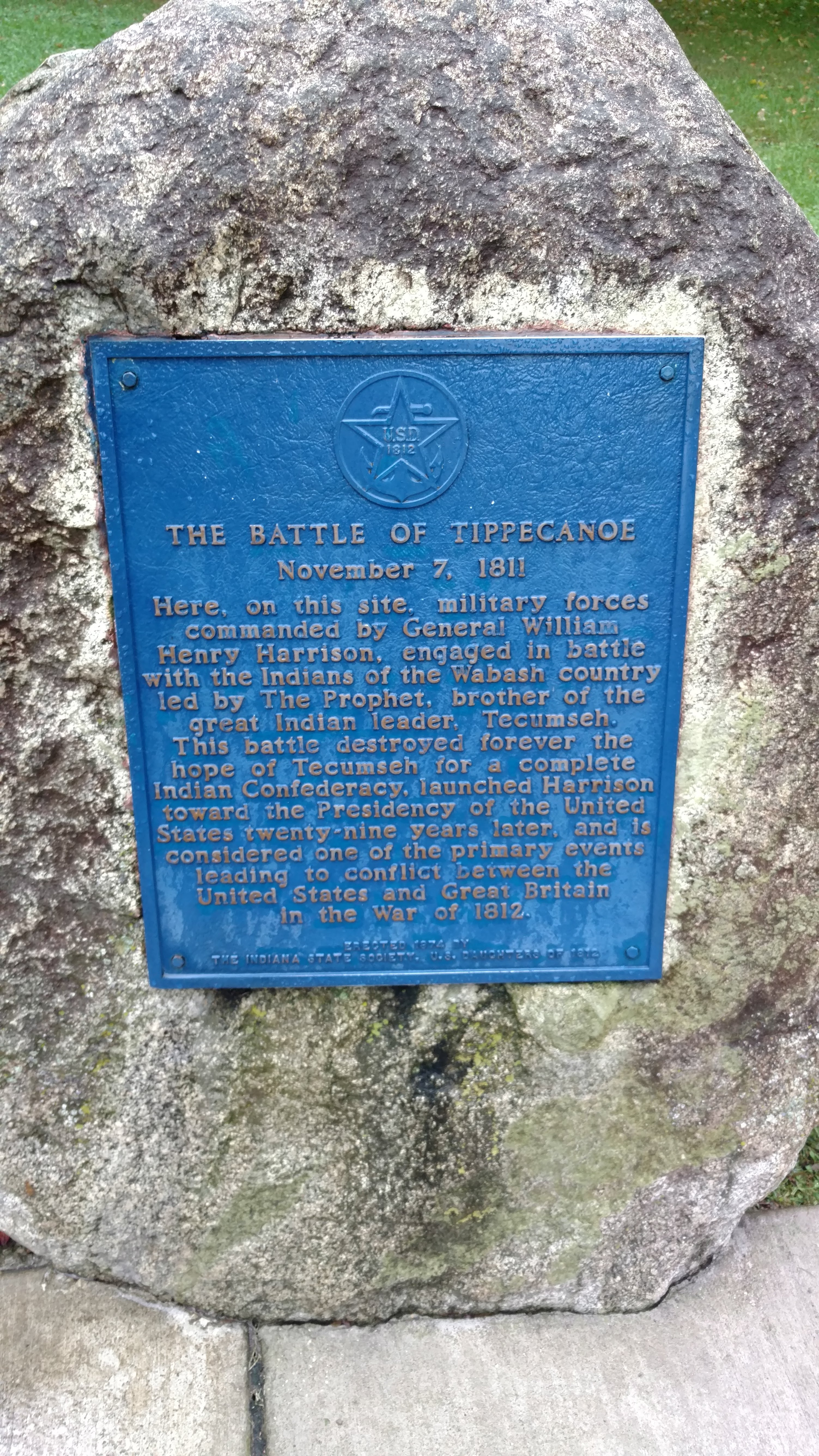
Historical marker at the site of the battle

On December 16, 1811, the first of the New Madrid earthquakes shook the South and the Midwest. Many tribes took the earthquake as a vindication of Tenskwatawa's powers, seeing it as a "call to action". They increased their attacks against American settlers and against isolated outposts in Indiana and the Illinois Territory, resulting in the deaths of many civilians. Tecumseh continued to play a major role in military operations on the frontier. By the time that the U.S. declared war on the United Kingdom on June 18, 1812, sparking the War of 1812, Tecumseh's confederacy was ready to launch its own war against the United States – this time with the British in open alliance.

The Shawnee partially rebuilt Prophetstown over the next year. Tecumseh continued to play a major role in military operations on the frontier. His warriors were with the British force that captured Fort Detroit from its American garrison on August 16, 1812, and it was not until Tecumseh's death at the Battle of the Thames on October 5, 1813, that his confederacy ceased to threaten the Americans. "Tippecanoe and Tyler Too" became the slogan and a popular song for Harrison and his running mate John Tyler in the 1840 United States presidential election. The Whigs leveraged Harrison's successes, using the song as a slogan and reminder of the battle.

== Memorial ==
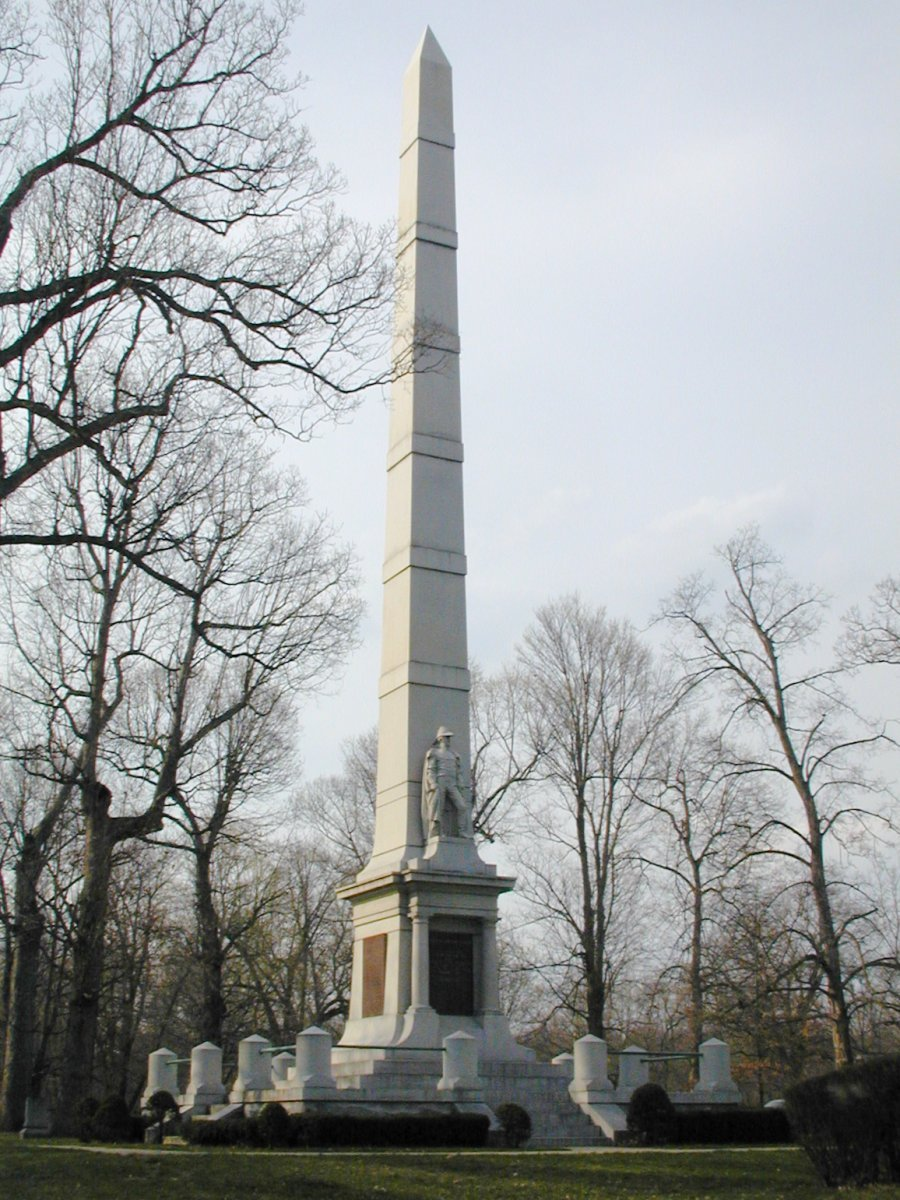
Monument at the battle site

The participants in the battle received the Thanks of Congress. The resolution originally included William Henry Harrison by name, but his name was removed before passage. Harrison considered this to be an insult, thinking that Congress implied that he was the one person in the campaign not worthy of accolades, and he suggested that it held him up to obloquy and disrespect. After Tippecanoe, Boyd's vocal criticism caused controversy. He said without the presence of the regulars, the militia would have been routed, and he questioned Harrison's fitness as commander. Harrison was, however, awarded the Thanks of Congress and a Congressional Gold Medal in 1818 for victory at the Battle of the Thames. A number of counties in Indiana were named for American soldiers at the battle: Bartholomew, Daviess, Spencer, Tipton and Warrick.

It shall be the duty of the General Assembly,
to provide for the permanent enclosure and
preservation of the Tippecanoe Battle-ground.

Harrison returned to the battlefield in 1835 to give speeches during his first presidential campaign, and he called for the creation of a memorial to preserve the battle site. John Tipton later purchased the land to preserve it and deeded it to the state on November 7, 1836, which was the twenty-fifth anniversary of the battle.

In 1908, the Indiana General Assembly commissioned an obelisk memorial at the battleground that was 85-foot (26 m) high. On October 9, 1960, the Tippecanoe Battlefield was named a National Historic Landmark. In 1961, some 10,000 people attended the 150th anniversary of the battle.

In the following years, the battle site attracted fewer visitors and fell into disrepair. The Tippecanoe County Historical Association now maintains the battleground and a museum about the battle.

== Sources ==
- Carnes, Mark C.; Mieczkowski, Yanek (2001). The Routledge Historical Atlas of Presidential Campaigns. New York: Routledge. ISBN 978-0-415-92139-8.
- Cave, Alfred A. (2006). Prophets of the Great Spirit. Lincoln: University of Nebraska Press. ISBN 978-0-8032-1555-9.
- Dillon, John Brown (1859). "Letters of William Henry Harrison". A History of Indiana. Bingham & Doughty. ISBN 978-0-253-20305-2.
- Jortner, Adam. (2011). The Gods of Prophetstown: The Battle of Tippecanoe and the Holy War for the American Frontier. Oxford University Press. ISBN 978-0199765294
- Langguth, A. J. (2006). Union 1812: The Americans Who Fought the Second War of Independence. New York: Simon & Schuster. ISBN 978-0-7432-2618-9.
- Owens, Robert M. (2007). Mr. Jefferson's Hammer: William Henry Harrison and the Origins of American Indian Policy. Norman: University of Oklahoma Press. ISBN 978-0-8061-3842-8.
- Pirtle, Alfred. (1900). The Battle of Tippecanoe. Louisville: John P. Morton & Co./ Library Reprints. p. 158. ISBN 978-0-7222-6509-3. as read to the Filson Club.
- Resa, Alva (1909). The Tippecanoe Battle-field Monument. New York: State of Indiana.
- Sugden, John (1999). Tecumseh: A Life. New York: Macmillan. ISBN 978-0-8050-6121-5.
- Tucker, Spencer C., ed. (2011). The Encyclopedia of North American Indian Wars, 1607–1890: A Political, Social, and Military History. Santa Barbara: ABC-CLIO. ISBN 978-1-8510-9603-9.
- Tunnell, IV, H.D. (1998). To Compel with Armed Force: A Staff Ride Handbook for the Battle of Tippecanoe. Fort Leavenworth, KS: Combat Studies Institute, U.S. Army Command and General Staff College.
- Winkler, John F (2015). Tippecanoe 1811. The Prophet's Battle. Oxford: Osprey. ISBN 9781472808844.
