= List of Algonquian personal names =

This is a list of persons whose names are in Algonquian languages.

== A ==
- Ahtahkakoop
- Andaigweos
- Assacumet
- Awashonks
- Aysh-ke-bah-ke-ko-zhay

== B ==
- Beshekee
- Biauswah
- Buckongahelas

== C ==
- Canonchet
- Canonicus
- Catahecassa
- Chanco
- Cheeseekau
- Chicagou
- Comas
- Corbitant
- Cowessess
- Custaloga

== D ==
- Debedeavon

== E ==
- Egushawa
- Ekhennabamate
- Epenow
- Exipakinoa

== G ==
- Gausolonon
- Gelelemend
- Giiwedinokwe
- Gomo

== H ==
- Hobomok
- Hokolesqua

== I ==
- Iowai
- Iniwe
- Isapo Muxika
- Itawi
- Iyannough

== K ==
- Kaneonuskatew
- Katonah
- Kawacatoose
- Kâwin
- Kechewaishke
- Kennekuk
- Keokuk
- Kesegowaase
- Kimot
- Kineubenae
- Kinje
- Kinkosh
- Kisecawchuck
- Kittamaquund

== L ==
- Lalawethika
- Lappawinsoe
- Lawoughqua

== M ==
- Machesan
- Ma-Ko-Ko-Mo
- Mahackemo
- Moluntha
- Mângotâs-i
- Mamanowatum
- Mamaroneck
- Mamongazeda
- Manteo
- Masaac
- Masconomet
- Maskepetoon
- Massasoit
- Match-E-Be-Nash-She-Wish
- Matoaka
- Matochshegan
- Mecosta
- Medweganoonind
- Meiachkwat
- Memeskia
- Memotas
- Menominee
- Mestigoit
- Metacomet
- Metallak
- Metea
- Methoataske
- Miantonomoh
- Michikinikw
- Mikins
- Moluntha
- Monaghie
- Mitci
- Monoco
- Mukuwusu
- Muscowequan
- M'katamowai

== N ==
- Nah-doos
- Nahnebahwequa
- Neaatooshing
- Necotowance
- Nemattanew
- Nescambious
- Nicanis
- Nisidi
- Nokomis
- Nonda
- Nonhelema
- Notanka
- Chief Niwot

== O ==
- Ojigkwanong
- Okamans
- Okichii
- Ondjita
- Opchanacanough
- Oratam
- Orono
- Chief Oshkosh
- Ozaawindib
- Ozhaguscodaywayquay

== P ==
- Pakan
- Pambogo
- Papakeecha
- Papeqwanapua
- Pashpo
- Pasis
- Passaconaway
- Pastedechouan
- Pattanochus
- Peracuta
- Petosegay
- Pinsanyo
- Pipinawaw
- Plausawa
- Pocahontas
- Pomunckey
- Powhatan
- Pusheta

== Q ==
- Qanyqanyta

== R ==
- Rahwack

== S ==
- Sabattus
- Senachewine
- Senachwine
- Shabbona
- Shick Shack
- Shaw-shaw-way-nay-beece
- Shingabawossin
- Shingas
- Shingwauk
- Squanto

== T ==
- Tacumwah
- Tagwagane
- Tagwanibisan
- Tamanend
- Tapastanum
- Taphance
- Tatamy
- Tebis
- Tecumseh
- Tenskwatawa
- Tessouat
- Tisquantum
- Tomocomo
- Totopotomoi
- Tuhbenahneequay

== U ==
- Uncas

== W ==
- Wabanquot
- Wabis
- Waubonsie
- Wahbanosay
- Wahunsunacock
- Wainchemahdub
- Wampage
- Wamsutta
- Wanchese
- Wannas
- Wapakoneta
- Wasson
- Wequash
- Watseka
- Wauseon
- Wâs
- Wâce
- Wâcegämi
- Wâsabi
- Waubojeeg
- Wawasee
- Wawatam
- Weetamoo
- Wewisla
- Weyapiersenwah
- Weyonomon
- Winamac
- Winona
- Windipi
- Wingina
- Witike
- Wonalancet
- Wosso
- Wyandanch

== See also ==
- List of English words from Indigenous languages of the Americas § Words from Algonquian languages
