= Shick Shack =

- Born: c. 1727 near the Illinois River
- Died: c. 1835 near Chandlerville, Illinois, United States
- Occupation: Potawatomi chieftain
- Known for: Chieftain of the Illinois River Potawatomi during the Black Hawk War; one of the head chieftains residing at Indiantown.
- Children: 2 children

Shick Shack (c. 1727 – c. 1835) was a 19th-century Potawatomi chieftain and leader of a band of the Illinois River Potawatomi. He was also involved in several conflicts during the Indian Wars, particularly during the Peoria and the Black Hawk Wars. He is best known, however, for providing the tribal history of Potawatomi and Kickapoo in Illinois prior to and during the early settlement of the region during the 18th and early 19th century. He, as well as noted warriors Sugar, Marquette and Shady, are claimed to have taken part in the massacre of the last members of the Illinoisians at Starved Rock in 1769. One of the highest hills in Illinois, Shick Shack Hill (or Shick-Shack's Nob) in Cass County, Illinois bears his name as does Shick Shack Sand Pond Nature Preserve Cass County, Illinois.

== Biography ==
As a chieftain living on the Illinois River, he took part in the Peoria War and was one of thirteen chieftains selected to represent the confederacy a peace delegation to St. Louis, Missouri. Under the escort of George Davenport, the chieftains arrived in St. Louis in late-December 1813 where a peace treaty was concluded shortly thereafter. Among those in attendance at the signing of the peace treaty included Black Partridge, Senachwine, Comas, Crow and Gomo.

He and his band, numbering forty men not including women and children, moved north in 1827 using the Indian Trail Farm of Wethersfield Township to travel to Prophetstown and then to the Wisconsin hill country; this is the last recorded use of Native Americans to use the old Indian trial.

During the previous winter of 1830–31, he and his tribe were camped at an old hunting ground near Pike Creek. He and members of his tribe were hunting dear when they encountered Daniel Dimmick, a settler for whom Dimmick's Grove is named, and related a story of an Ottawa hunting party which had been attacked a group of Illinoisians many years ago. Many of them were killed and their war chieftain Chief Pontiac was wounded. A state of war lasted between the two tribes before the last of the Illinoisians were killed at Starved Rock during the 1760s.

Among the major battles fought along the Illinois River, he recounted a battle fought at Terre Haute, Indiana between him and a rival chieftain, a Chief Sugar. Shick Shack led a force of 300 warriors against him and, although the number of Sugar's army is unknown, only 12 braves (seven Kickapoo/Potatomi and five Miami) survived after a nearly 14-hour battle. Another account claims he was only one of several war chiefs present at the battle between the Potawatomi and Kickapoo against the Miami, placed in what is now Shades State Park during September 1775, and was one of the survivors. Author and historian Nehemiah Matson, claimed that the battle was thought to be the same conflict of the Biblical hosts Abner and Joab which occurred at the Pool of Gibeon and the numbers of the combatants increased from twelve to three hundred to correspond with the legend.

In February 1832, he and Senachwine attended a war council held between the Potawatomi, Winnebago, Sauk and Meskwaki at Indiantown, a major Potawatomi settlement on the Illinois. He may have remained to the area during the Black Hawk War and is possibly the same chieftain to have been involved in the capture of Black Hawk following his defeat at the Battle of Bad Axe. In 1832, he was sighted at Dixon's Ferry where he was friendly with the local residents and visited some of his old friends who had been stationed at the post. He reportedly died some years later and buried near Chandlerville, Illinois, one of them few Potawatomi chieftains to be buried near their native villages.

On September 16, 1873, local towns in LaSalle County, Illinois held a celebration marking the two-hundred-year anniversary of the discovery of Starved Rock. Among those honored were its discoverers, the French explorers Louis Joliet and Jacques Marquette, as well as Shick Shack whose story to Daniel Dimmick was retold in a speech entitled "A Legend of Starved Rock" by Perry Armstrong, a noted author of the Black Hawk War and to whom the story was told to him by Shick Shack when he was 9 years old. Armstrong's speech received extensive press coverage and achieved some minor notoriety in its time.
