= George Davenport =

English-American pioneer and civic planner (1783–1845)

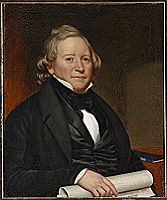
- George Davenport holding a rolled parchment city map of Davenport by Peter Britt, circa 1845
- Born: George William King; 1783; Lincolnshire, England
- Died: July 4, 1845 (aged 62); Rock Island, Illinois, U.S.
- Cause of death: Murder
- Resting place: Chippiannock Cemetery, Rock Island, Rock Island County, Illinois
- Occupations: Sailor, frontiersman, soldier, fur trader, merchant, postmaster, Indian agent, city planner
- Employer(s): U.S. Government, American Fur Company, self employed
- Known for: One of the first pioneers to settle in Rock Island, Illinois and one of the co-founders of Davenport, Iowa.

Signature
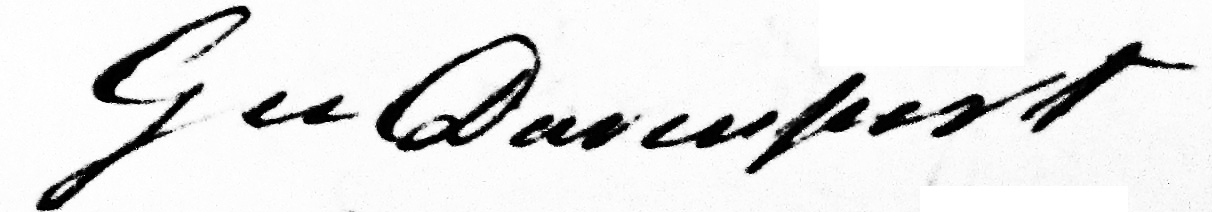

Colonel George Davenport, born George William King (1783 – July 4, 1845), was a 19th-century English-American sailor, frontiersman, fur trader, merchant, postmaster, US Army soldier, Indian agent, and city planner. A prominent and well-known settler in the Iowa Territory, he was one of the earliest settlers in Rock Island. He spent much of his life involved in the early settlement of the Mississippi Valley and the "Quad Cities". The present-day city of Davenport, Iowa is named after him.

== Early life ==
George Davenport was born in 1783 in Lincolnshire, England, becoming an apprentice to his uncle, a merchant captain, and going to sea at an early age. During the next several years, he visited ports in the Baltic as well as in France, Spain, and Portugal. In the fall of 1803, shortly after arriving with a cargo from Liverpool, Davenport was arrested with the rest of his crew while in port at St. Petersburg when the Czarist Russian government acceded to Napoleon's embargo on British vessels (the "Continental System"). Davenport was imprisoned until the spring when he was released and allowed to return to his home country.

Davenport arrived in New York the following summer. While in port, he suffered a severe leg injury during the rescue of a fellow sailor who had fallen overboard. As the merchant ship was without a ship's surgeon, he was forced to stay in a hospital, while his ship returned to Liverpool.

== Family ==
Davenport married Margaret Bowling Lewis, a widow 14 years his elder, in 1814, and they remained married until his death. However, all of Davenport's children were born out of wedlock which has long been somewhat of an open secret. The mothers of his children are sometimes simply not listed when they are discussed. However, the mothers of his three known children are documented and are the source of controversy. Susan Lewis, Davenport's 16 year old step-daughter, was the mother of his first son, George L'Oste, in 1817. Susan was also the mother of his second son, Bailey, who was born in 1824 and served as mayor of Rock Island during the Civil War. While she was not a blood relation, this relationship would have been seen as incestuous in the period. His only known daughter, Elizabeth, was born through a relationship with Catherine Pouitt, a laundress at Fort Armstrong on Rock Island, in 1835. There have also long been rumors of Davenport children born to Sauk and Meskwaki women and possibly other, European-American, women though none are known to be confirmed.

== Military service ==
George Davenport, while recovering in the New York hospital on his doctor's advice, decided to settle in the United States of America, moving to Rahway, New Jersey for a time, before enlisting in the United States Army at Carlisle, Pennsylvania, in 1806. Accepting an appointment as sergeant, he was assigned to the 1st Infantry Regiment and assisted in recruiting for the army in Harrisburg, Pennsylvania as well as training recruits at the Carlisle Barracks.

Davenport remained in the army for ten years, participating in the War of 1812 under General James Wilkinson. At the end of the Peoria War, in late December 1813, he escorted the Potawatomi peace delegation to St. Louis where the peace treaty was signed. Chieftains in the delegation included Black Partridge, Senachwine, Comas, Shick Shack, Crow, and Gomo.

== Ft. Armstrong, Rock Island – U.S. Army supplier ==
In the spring of 1816, after being discharged from the army, George Davenport accompanied Colonel Lawrence, as an army supplier, for an expedition to Rock Island, where Fort Armstrong was established. After he was discharged, Davenport became a successful merchant and traded with the local tribes in the Illinois and Iowa territories for several years. Soon after his arrival, he built a double log cabin. This was the first permanent residence built in the Rock Island-area, from which grew into a small frontier town. The first recorded religious service was held at his home in 1819.

Around this time, Davenport entered a partnership with fellow pioneer and fur trader, Russell Farnham. Building a house on the mainland opposite of Rock Island, the two founded Farnhamsburg, a small village from which present-day Rock Island, Illinois, developed. 1825, Davenport was appointed as the first postmaster of Rock Island when the post office was established.

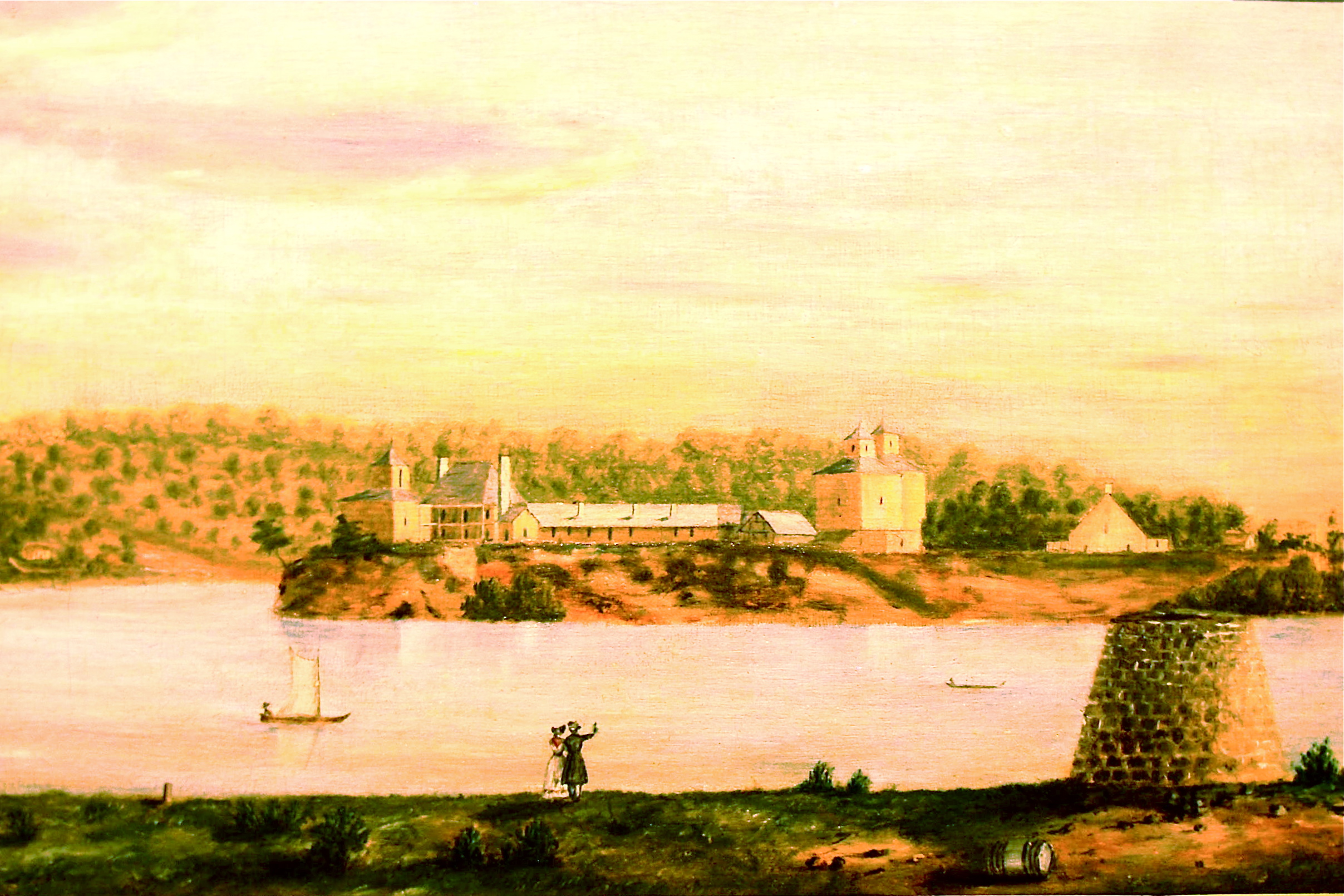
Fort Armstrong, Rock Island, Illinois, in 1838, the year that George Davenport was appointed a United States Indian Agent, from a painting by Octave Blair

== Into the fur trade and United States Indian Agent ==
In 1826, he resigned his position to become an agent for John Jacob Astor's American Fur Company with Farnham and oversaw its interests from Iowa to the Turkey River. During the Black Hawk War, he was made an assistant quartermaster with a commission of colonel by Governor John Reynolds.

In 1833, Davenport moved from his double log cabin and built his home on a lower part of Rock Island near the old fort. Two years later, he and six others (including close friend Antoine LeClaire), purchased a large tract of land along the Mississippi River opposite the island. On this site, the town of Davenport, Iowa, was officially founded on February 23, 1836. In 1838, he succeeded U.S. Indian agent Joseph M. Street as a representative of the Sauk and Meskwaki until 1840. In 1842, he and several others negotiated a treaty on behalf of Governor John Chambers between the Iowa territorial government and the Sauk and Fox for the sale of their lands in Iowa.

Davenport departed the American Fur Company following the signing of the treaty and retired to private life on his Rock Island estate. He often travelled to St. Louis, Missouri, sailing on his keel boat, and resided there or in Washington City during the winter months. He also laid out plans for an addition to the small town of Moline, Illinois.

== Murder by bandits ==
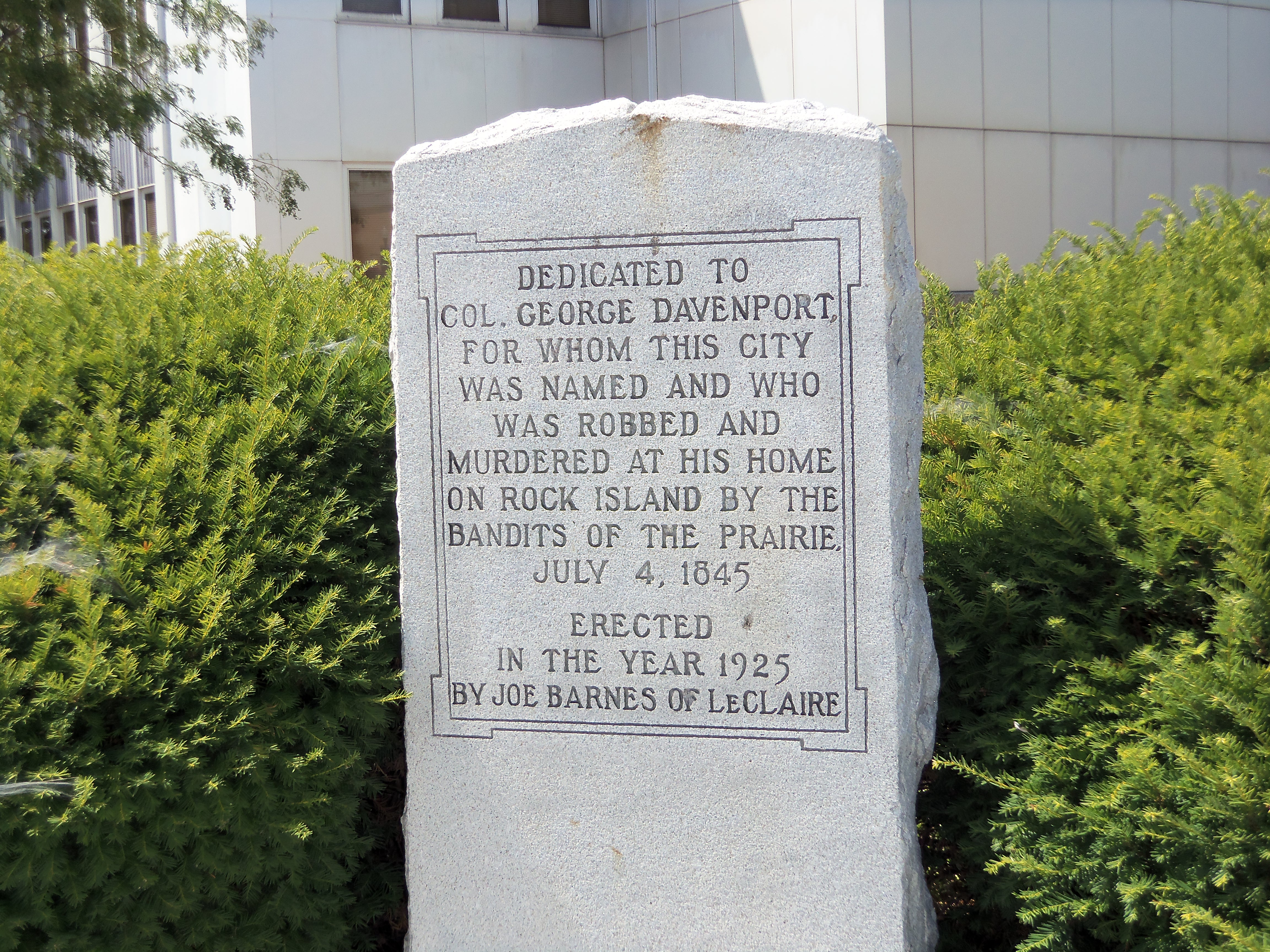
George Davenport Monument on the Scott County Courthouse grounds in Davenport, Iowa

On July 4, 1845, the Davenport family went to the Illinois mainland, from their home on Rock Island, to celebrate Independence Day. Colonel Davenport stayed behind, however; and sometime during the late afternoon, a band of local bandits forced their way into Davenport's home. Accounts differ as to the nature of the assault, as one version claims he was shot by the burglars while another states the elderly Bowman was severely beaten when his assailants found there was far less money in the safe than they had first believed. Davenport was still alive when the men finally left his home and was able to describe them to authorities before he died.

The suspects were traced to a loosely organized Middle West ruffian gang, operating out of northern Illinois, known as the "Banditti of the Prairie". Detective and bounty hunter Edward Bonney volunteered to infiltrate the gang and was able to arrest eight men, including Robert H. Birch. Although one man escaped and another disappeared, the others stood trial and were convicted of murder. Two received prison sentences while another three, Granville Young and brothers John and Aaron Long, were later arrested and executed for the crime. In October 1845, shortly before their execution, Young and the Long brothers were photographed by daguerreotypists Thomas Martin Easterly and Frederick F. Webb.

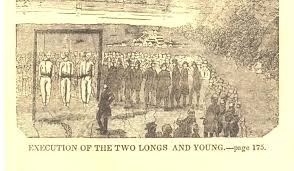
The October 1845 hangings of Granville Young and John and Aaron Long, Banditti murderers of Colonel George Davenport, from the 1850 book The Banditti of the Prairies, Or, The Murderer's Doom!!: A Tale of the Mississippi Valley by Edward Bonney, who is standing to the right of the gallows, wearing a top hat and black suit.

== Landmark house ==
One of the earliest buildings to be built on Rock Island, Davenport's home still exists and remains one of the oldest residential landmarks in northern Illinois. The house was later used as the temporary headquarters of a Confederate prisoner-of-war camp during the American Civil War. The house is currently operated by the Colonel Davenport Historical Foundation as a civil war and house museum. It had fallen into severe disrepair by the late 1800s, and the wings of the house were razed. The remainder of the house was preserved, and by the 1980s, efforts had begun to fully reconstruct the demolished parts of the home. Today, the east and west wings have been added back to the structure, and the home is open for tours during the warmer months.
