= Robert H. Birch =

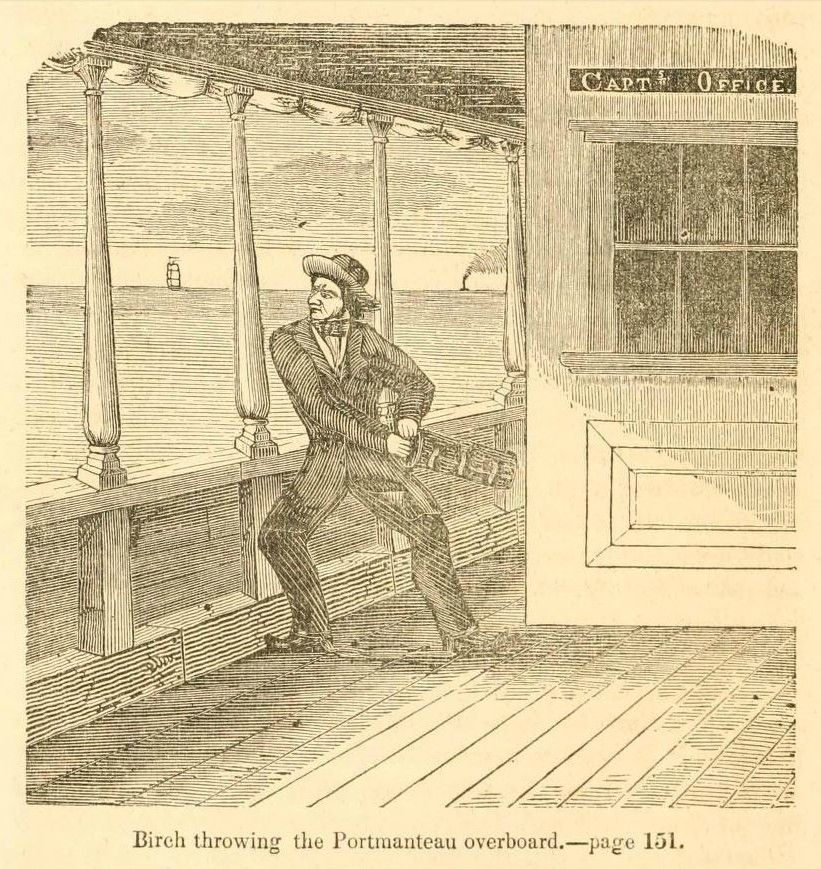
- An illustration of Robert Birch from the Edward Bonney book The Banditti of the Prairies, Or, The Murderer's Doom!!: A Tale of the Mississippi Valley at 18 years old in 1846 being pursued by the law toward the end of his outlaw period with the Midwestern criminals the "Banditti of the Prairie".
- Born: Robert Henry Birch c. 1827; New York or North Carolina
- Died: c. 1866 (aged 39); Arizona Territory, present-day Arizona
- Other names: Robert Birch, Henry Birch, "Three-Fingered" Birch, Robert Harris, R. Harris, R. Haris, Haris, Owin, Haines, Gains, Thomas Brown, Tom Brown, Robert Blecher, R.H. Blecher
- Occupations: bandit, burglar, prospector, postmaster, soldier
- Employer(s): Confederate States government, self-employed
- Known for: Being an accomplice in the torture-murder of Colonel George Davenport and a member of the notorious Banditti of the Prairie
- Military career
- Allegiance: Confederate States; Confederate Arizona Territory
- Branch: Confederate Army
- Service years: 1862-1865
- Units: Company A, Arizona Rangers; Colonel John Salmon Ford's Second Texas Cavalry
- Conflicts: American Civil War

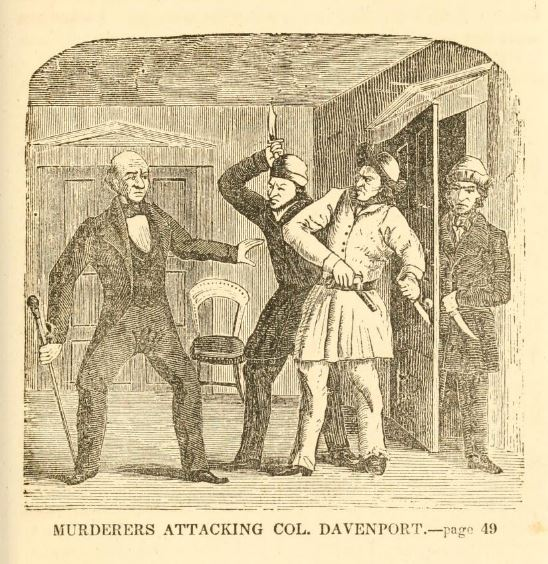
An illustration from Edward Bonney's book Banditti of the Prairies in which Robert Birch and his accomplices in the Banditti of the Prairie attacked and murdered Colonel George Davenport at his home on July 4, 1845. Birch was later captured and arrested for the crimes and escaped from jail in Wisconsin.

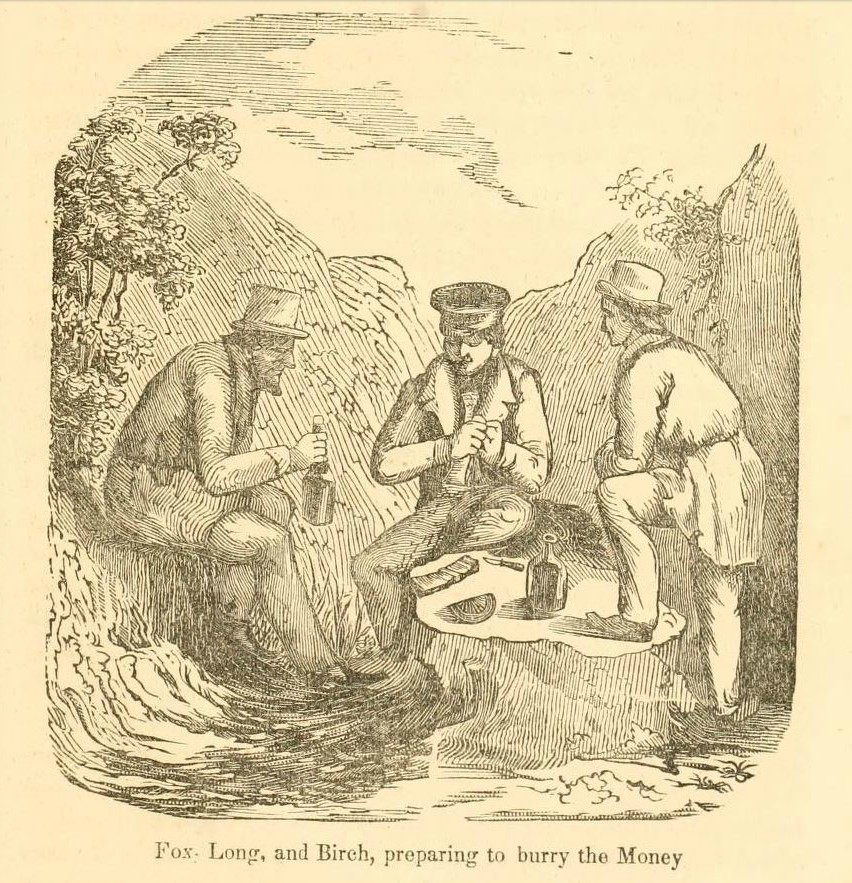
Robert H. Birch with his Banditti outlaw partners, William Fox and John Long burying ill-gotten loot

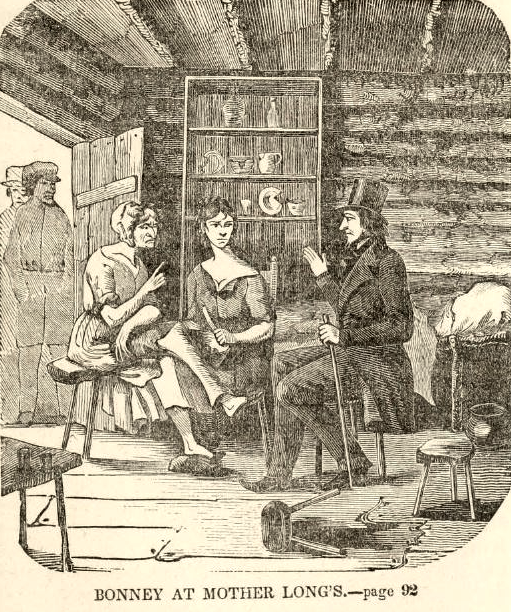
An illustration of Edward Bonney, from his book Banditti of the Prairies who as a bounty hunter and amateur detective in 1846, began a man-hunt doggedly pursued Robert Birch and his accomplices in the "Banditti of the Prairie", from Illinois to Ohio and back to Chicago for the torture-murder of Colonel George Davenport and counterfeiting.

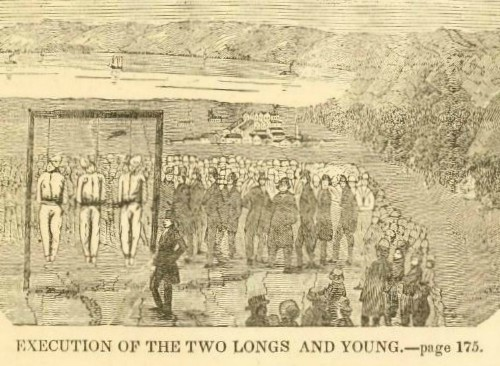
Robert Birch was arrested for his part in the torture-murder of Colonel George Davenport but because he broke out of jail in 1847, through outside help or bribery, in Knoxville, Illinois his case never went to trial and he vanished without a trace. The October, 1845 hangings of Granville Young and John and Aaron Long, Banditti murderers of Colonel Davenport, from the 1850 book, The Banditti of the Prairies, Or, The Murderer's Doom!!: A Tale of the Mississippi Valley by Edward Bonney, who is standing to the right of the gallows, wearing a top hat and black suit.

Robert H. "Three-Fingered" Birch, born Robert Henry Birch (c. 1827 – c. 1866), was a 19th-century American adventurer, criminal, soldier, lawman, postmaster, and prospector. He was a member of the infamous "Banditti of the Prairie" in his youth, whose involvement in the torture-murder of Colonel George Davenport in 1845 led to his turning state's evidence against his co-conspirators. Birch was also the discoverer of the Pinos Altos gold mine with Jacob Snively and James W. Hicks. During the American Civil War, he served in the American Southwest with the Confederate forces of the Arizona Rangers and 2nd Texas Cavalry.

== Early life ==
Robert Birch claimed to have been born in New York, but amateur detective, Edward Bonney alleged, that Birch's father, John "Old Coon" Birch Sr., stated, in their home, which was nine miles southwest of Marshall, in Clark County, Illinois, that Robert had been born in North Carolina. Birch had moved with his father and his two brothers, John Jr. and Timothy, to Illinois, as a child.

== Criminal pursuits in Middle West ==
=== Banditti of the Prairie ===
Robert Birch became involved in crime, as a teenager, being described by Bonney, as "suspected of robbery and even of murder ever since he had attained the age of fifteen". Robert Birch was a close associate of bandit, William Fox, as both were considered notorious "prairie pirates" and longtime members of what were called the Banditti of the Prairie. Birch was a self-styled Mormon, who conveniently, used his church membership, as a Latter Day Saint, to gain protection in Nauvoo, Illinois, when the law was hot on his trail.

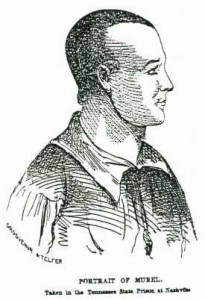
A drawing of the infamous southern criminal gang leader John A. Murrell from the only known, accurate portrait made of him during his lifetime. Robert Birch was said to have had criminal connections with Murrell but this is highly improbable since he would have been only a seven-year-old child or possibly Birch's criminal father was associated with John A. Murrell.

Robert Birch accompanied Jacob Snively in 1858 in helping found Arizona's first gold rush boom town Gila City in which Birch became the first postmaster. He would later join Snively and James W. Hicks in discovering gold deposits on Bear Creek. The ghost town Pinos Altos was first named Birchville in his honor.

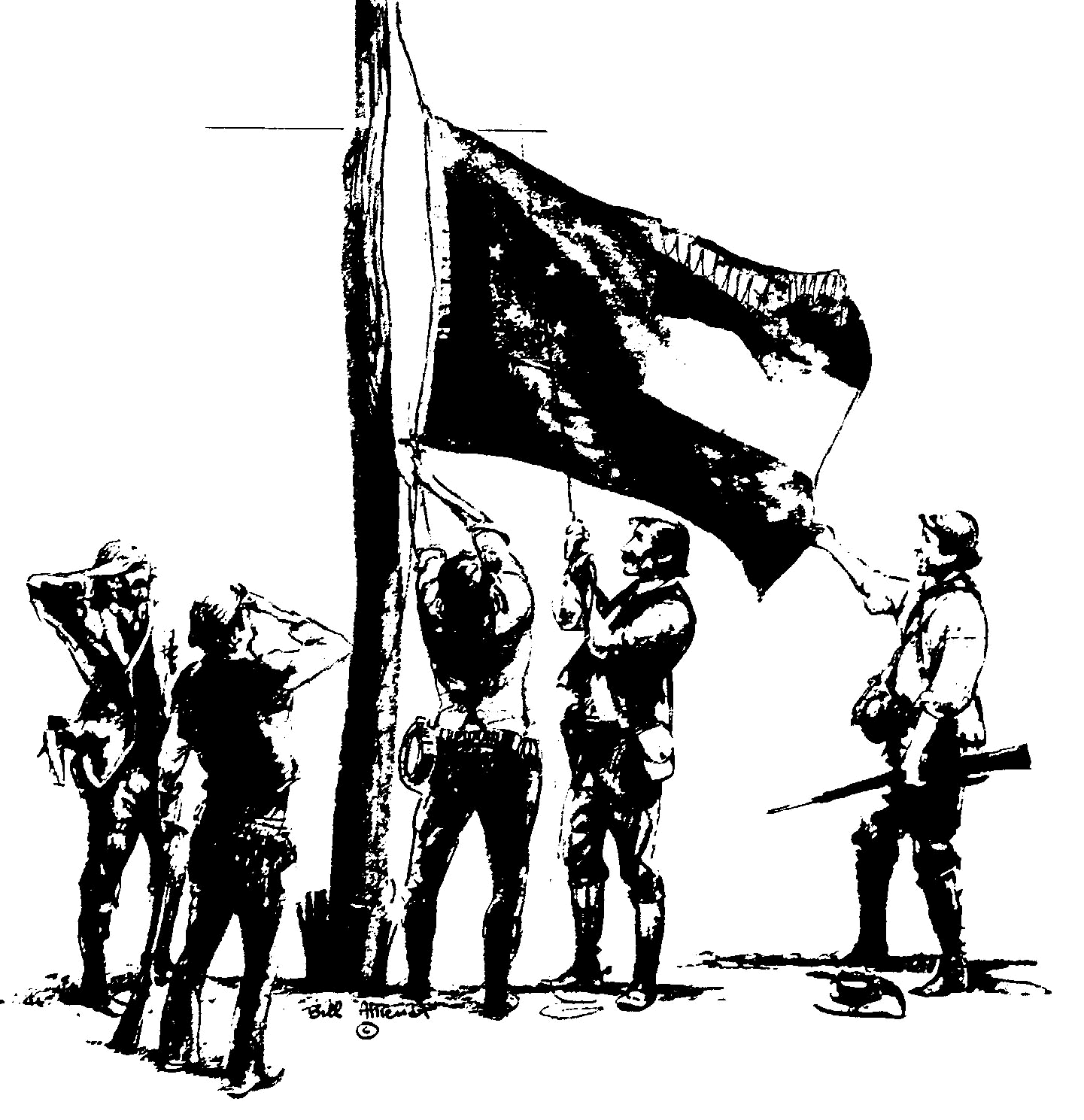
In the beginning of the American Civil War, Robert Birch enlisted in the Confederate Army in the Rebel-held, southern half of the Union New Mexico Territory, known as the Confederate Territory of Arizona with Company A, Arizona Rangers. The Rangers would later occupy Tucson in February 1862, raising the national flag of the Confederate States of America.

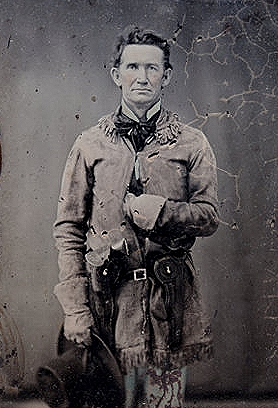
Robert Birch later transferred and served under Colonel John Salmon Ford in the Texas 2nd Cavalry of the Confederate Army on the Rio Grande

=== Alleged criminal connections with John A. Murrell ===
Robert Birch, may have had ties to Tennessee outlaw, John A. Murrell and his Mystic Clan, using a number of criminal aliases including; Robert Harris, R. Harris, R. Haris, Haris, Owin, Haines, Gains, Thomas Brown, Tom Brown, Robert Blecher, R. H. Blecher. But, this claim does not hold up to scrutiny, as Birch would have been only seven years old, in 1834, when Murrell was arrested and began serving his ten-year prison sentence. Robert Birch, more likely, might have had older relatives, such as his father, uncles, or cousins, who were on the Mystic Clan's membership rolls in the U.S. Southern states or were connected to outlaws who were Murrell associates. After the demise of Murrell, many of the members of the future "Banditti" were driven out of "The South" and to avoid arrest, execution, or death at the hands of regulators and moved farther north, relocating their criminal activities in the still, lawless, frontier of the Middle West, mainly in the states of Illinois, Indiana, and Ohio.

=== Torture-murder of Colonel Davenport, arrest, and escape ===
When Robert Birch was 18 years old, he was alleged by James Henry Tevis of being involved in the torture-murder of Colonel George Davenport at his home on July 4, 1845. Robert Birch was one of several members later identified by Edward Bonney who had infiltrated the gang as a bogus counterfeiter. Ironically, three years earlier, Bonney had been arrested and charged with counterfeiting in Indiana but escaped before his conviction. Birch was soon apprehended, in part due to information from Bonney, and he soon agreed to testify against the others in exchange for a reduced sentence. Granville Young and brothers John and Aaron Long were later executed for the murder. After several court delays, Robert Birch broke out of jail, through outside help or bribery, in Knoxville, Illinois, March 22, 1847.

== Honest pursuits in New Mexico Territory ==
=== New Mexico Gold Rush ===
Disappearing into the frontier, of the Midwest United States, Robert Birch resurfaced, almost, a decade later, a reformed, honest man and an associate of Jacob Snively, the founder of Arizona's first gold rush boom town Gila City, and became the first postmaster on December 24, 1858. Two years later, Birch followed Snively and James W. Hicks to the New Mexico Territory where they discovered gold deposits on Bear Creek. A mining camp soon sprang up around the claim, on the site of what is today the ghost town of Pinos Altos, and was originally named Birchville in his honor.

== American Civil War service ==
When the Confederate Army invaded the territory of New Mexico, at the start of the American Civil War, they created the Confederate Territory of Arizona Robert Birch possibly because of his southern family leanings volunteered for military service. He initially served with Company A, Arizona Rangers under 2nd Lieutenant James Henry Tevis however, according to Tevis, Birch asked to be transferred to Colonel John Salmon Ford's Second Texas Cavalry on the Rio Grande.

== Death ==
Robert Birch died in 1866, in Arizona Territory, present-day Arizona.

== Books ==
- Bonney, Edward. The Banditti of the Prairies, Or, The Murderer's Doom!!: A Tale of the Mississippi Valley. Norman: University of Oklahoma Press, (1850) 1963.
- Tevis, James H. Arizona in the '50s. Albuquerque: University of New Mexico Press, 1954.
- Thrapp, Dan L. Encyclopedia of Frontier Biography: In Three Volumes, Volume I (A-F). Lincoln: University of Nebraska Press, 1988.
- Wellman, Paul L. Spawn of Evil. Doubleday and Company, 1964.
