= Comas (Potawatomi leader) =

Potawatomi chieftain

- Born: near the Illinois River
- Occupation: Potawatomi chieftain
- Known for: Head of the Wappa Indian village during the early 19th century; war chieftain and ally of Black Partridge during the Peoria War.
- Relatives: Black Partridge, father-in-law

Chief Comas (fl. 1809 – 1814) was a 19th-century Potawatomi chieftain who, as one of several leaders of the Illinois River Potawatomi, was a war chieftain during the Peoria War. Although favoring peace with the United States during Tecumseh's War, he and other Potawatomi chieftains were forced into war with the federal government.

== Biography ==
One of the major chieftains living on the Illinois River, Comas is first recorded as head of the Indian village of Wappa on Bureau Creek. The village was one of the largest Potawatomi settlements in the region and located eight miles from the river on present-day Tiskilwa, Illinois. In 1809, he was one of several chieftains visited by Joseph Trotier who brought "assurances of peace and friendship" from Governor Ninian Edwards. As a token of friendship, Comas presented Trotier with a pair of large elk horns and a panther skin, which he had fashioned himself, as a gift for Governor Edwards.

The following summer, he was one of several chieftains approached by Tecumseh and other Shawnee but sided with other chieftains, including his father-in-law Black Partridge, who wished to remain neutral during Tecumseh's War. He later took part in the Peoria War, his village being the staging point for Black Partridge's raid against Fort Clark in the fall of 1813, and was one of thirteen chieftains sent to St. Louis, Missouri to negotiate peace. Escorted by Colonel George Davenport, the peace delegation arrived in St. Louis where a peace treaty was concluded shortly thereafter. Among those in attendance at the signing of the peace treaty included Black Partridge, Senachwine, Crow and Gomo.
