= Gomo (Potawatomi leader) =

19th-century Potawatomi chieftain

- Died: 1815 near Chillicothe, Illinois
- Other name: Masseno
- Occupation: Potawatomi chieftain
- Known for: Head of the Illinois River Potawatomi; war chieftain and ally of Black Partridge during the Peoria War.
- Title: Chieftain of the Illinois River Potawatomie
- Term: c. 1809-1815
- Successor: Senachwine
- Relatives: Senachwine, brother

Chief Gomo (Potawatomi: Masseno) (died 1815) was a 19th-century Potawatomi chieftain. He and his brother Senachwine were among the more prominent war chiefs to fight alongside Black Partridge during the Peoria War.

== Biography ==
Gomo is first recorded as a chieftain living on the Illinois River, his village being located 25 miles north of present-day Peoria, Illinois. In 1809, he was one of several chieftains visited by Joseph Trotier who brought "assurances of peace and friendship" from Ninian Edwards, territorial governor of Illinois. He and other Potawatomi chieftains were approached by Tecumseh and the Shawnee during Tecumseh's War, however he was one of several chieftains who wished to remain neutral during the conflict.

In July 1811, Gomo spoke with U.S. Indian Agent Thomas Forsyth on behalf of Missouri territorial Governor William Clark requesting he surrender the Potawatomi responsible for the Gasconade murders which had occurred earlier that year. He denied his own bands involvement and sympathized with Clark, instead casting suspicion towards Tecumseh's brother The Prophet, however he replied that he did not have the power to "enforce his sole will against so many". He also informed Clark of the whereabouts of Main Poc who was staying in Detroit for the fall. Along with 120 of his warriors, Main Poc was preparing for hostilities the moment Great Britain and the United States went to war.

After the Potawatomi responsible were located on Shoal Creek, Captain Samuel Levering proceed to Gomo's village with 50 men. Intending to deliver a letter from Clark, he sent a French-descended trader to inform Gomo of his arrival. However, a Potawatomi had arrived ahead of the trader and reported to Gomo of the soldiers approaching the village. He later sent a message to Levering that he would not meet with him without an escort of 14 warriors. On August 5, he had an American flag flown from his village and allowed Levering to enter as to receive the letter from Clark. He told Levering that he was willing to cooperate with Clark, at least to the best of his ability, and called a council of the local chieftains. Levering left some tobacco as a gift for the council while they visited other villages upriver. Gomo encouraged other chieftains to attend and hear the address of the governor for themselves so that he would not be accused of treachery or of being a "sugar mouth". Held on the morning of August 16, the Potawatomi discussed the escalating violence and horse stealing against the settlers. The council refused to turn over the perpetrators, although they eventually agreed to return the horses. Little Chief returned two horses to Captain Nathan Heald at Fort Dearborn while Gomo promised to return the rest. The murderers of the Coles party were also found in a village 20 miles west of Tippecanoe.

Although denying his bands involvement, he feared he might be coerced into ceding Potawatomi lands and avoided meeting with Ninian Edwards the following year to discuss the issue further. In April 1812, he finally agreed to a conference with Edwards at Cahokia which included Senachwine, Comas and Black Partridge as well as eighteen other minor chiefs and warriors. During the conference, Edwards warned Gomo and the others of British ambitions in the region. Although he assured the Potawatomi that the United States government had no intentions of forcing the Potawatomi from their lands, Gomo and the others were reluctant to accede to their requests.

During the War of 1812, his village was one of a number of Potawatomi settlements destroyed during an expedition by the Illinois Rangers. Under orders from Edwards, a detachment of Illinois Rangers set fire to every major Potawatomi settlement on the Illinois River between Edwardsville and Quincy, Illinois. During the burning of Peoria, he and two other warriors provided food and shelter for the women and children escaping from the village and gave them bark canoes to travel upriver to Cahokia.

A later participant in the Peoria War, he and twelve other chieftains, including Senachwine, Shick Shack, Comas, Crow and Black Partridge, were escorted to St. Louis, Missouri by Colonel George Davenport to negotiate a peace treaty. He was one of the signatories when the treaty was successfully signed soon after arriving in St. Louis. Gomo was succeeded by his brother Senachwine following his death in 1815.
