= Thomas Martin Easterly =

American daguerreotypist (1809–1882)

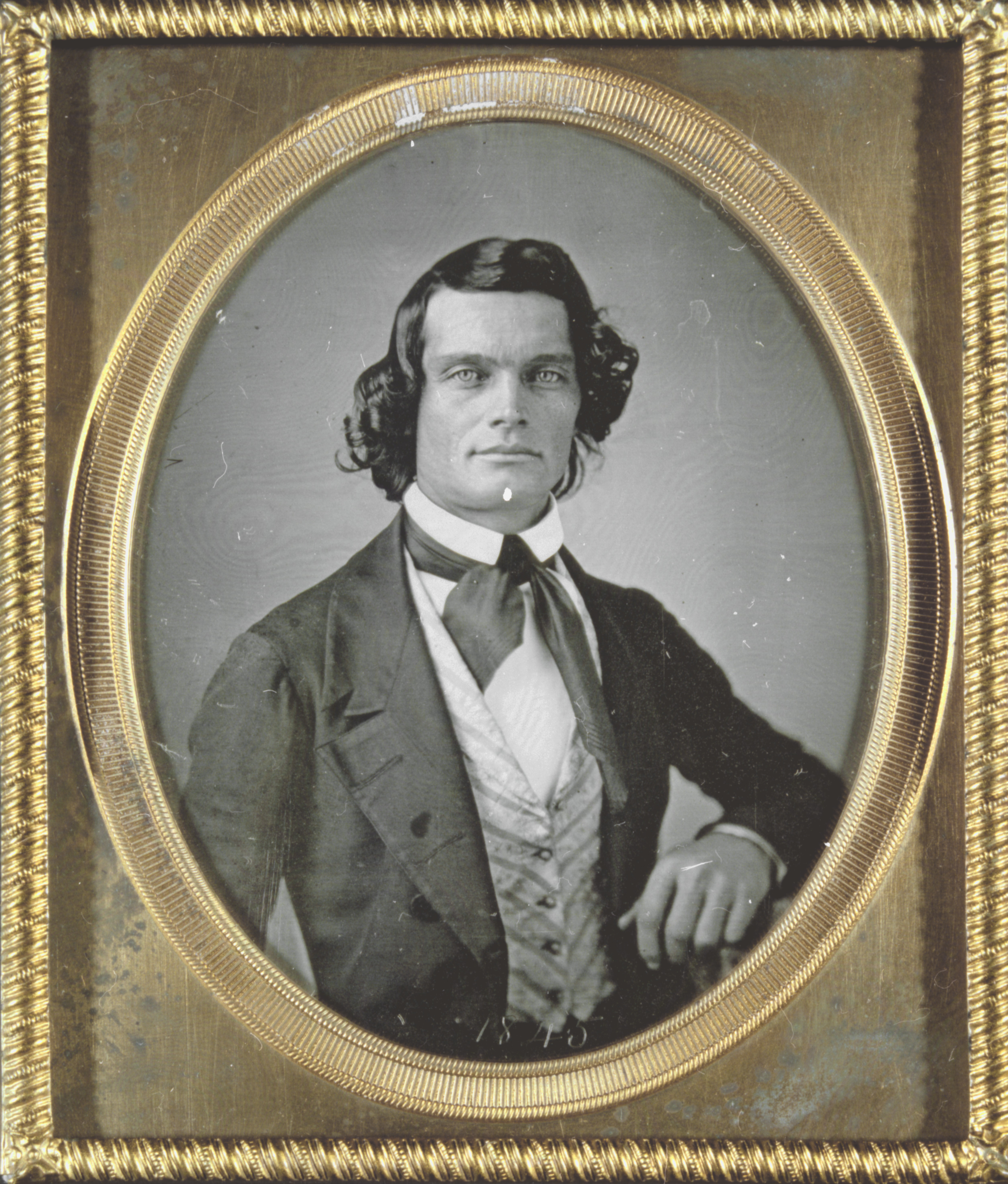
- Thomas Easterly Portrait, 1845. From the Missouri Historical Society, St. Louis.
- Born: October 3, 1809; Guilford, Vermont, United States
- Died: March 12, 1882 (aged 72); St. Louis, Missouri
- Occupations: Daguerreotypist and photographer
- Known for: Leading American daguerreotypist during the mid-19th century; founded one of the first permanent art galleries in Missouri and took the first known photograph of a lightning bolt.
- Spouse: Anna Miriam Bailey (m. 1850–1882)
- Parent(s): Tunis Easterly and Philomena Richardson

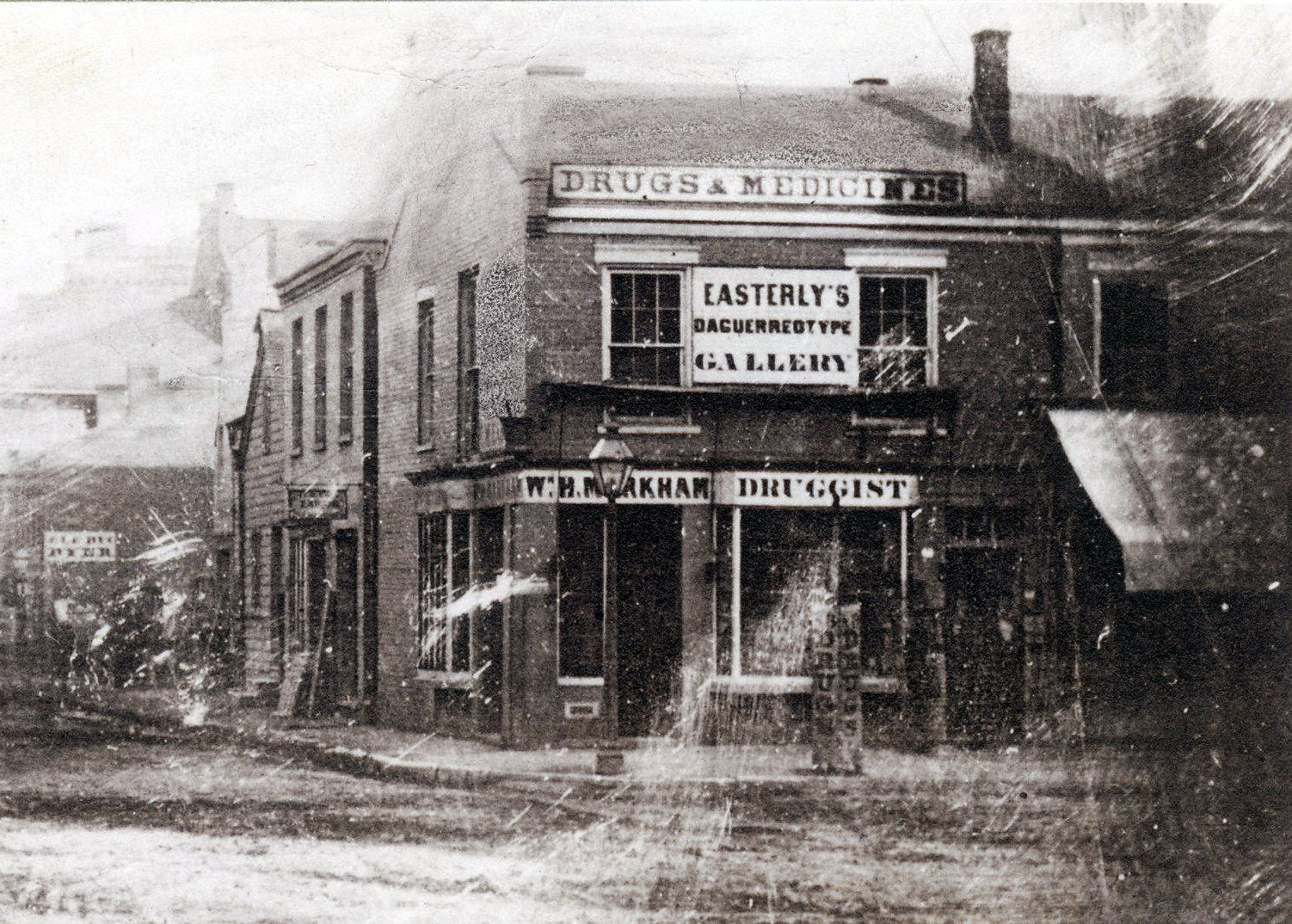
Easterly's Daguerreotype Gallery, St. Louis, 1851 From Missouri Historical Society, St. Louis

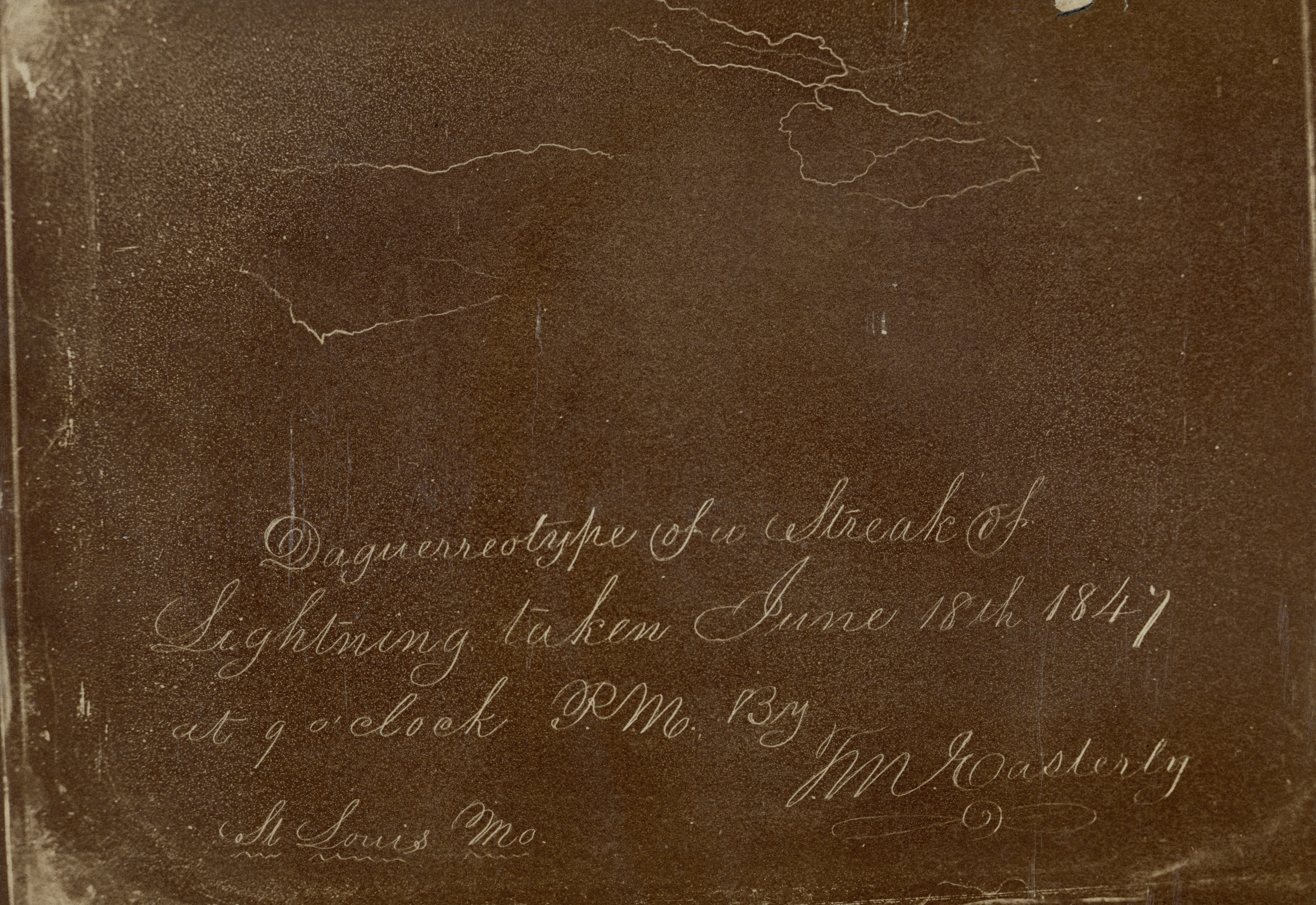
Copy photograph of a lost Thomas Easterly daguerreotype that captured a streak of lightning on June 18th, 1847. From Missouri Historical Society, St. Louis

Thomas Martin Easterly (October 3, 1809 – March 12, 1882) was a 19th-century American daguerreotypist and photographer. One of the more prominent and well-known daguerreotypists in the Midwest United States during the 1850s, his studio became one of the first permanent art galleries in Missouri.

Although his reputation was limited to the Midwest during his lifetime, he is considered to have been one of the foremost experts in the field of daguerreotype photography in the United States during the mid-to-late 19th century. He took the very first known photograph of a lightning bolt in history.

== Biography ==
Born in Guilford, Vermont, he was the second of five children born to Tunis Easterly and Philomena Richardson. He reportedly came from a poor background, his father being a farmer and part-time shoemaker, and was living away from home at age 11. Around 1830, he was living in St. Lawrence County, New York although little is known of his early years.

He began working as itinerant calligrapher and a penmanship teacher traveling throughout Vermont, New Hampshire and New York during the 1830s and 40s. By 1844, he had begun practicing photography taking outdoor photographs of architectural landmarks and scenic sites in Vermont. Among his earliest daguerreotypes, made a decade before outdoor photography was popular or profitable, those of the Winooski and Connecticut rivers are the only known examples to be self-consciously influenced by the romantic landscape paintings of the Hudson River School artists. He was also the first and only daguerreotypist to identify his work using engraved signatures and descriptive captions.

In the fall of 1845, Easterly traveled to the Midwest United States and toured the Mississippi River with Frederick F. Webb as representatives of the Daguerreotype Art Union. The two gained some notoriety from their photography of the criminals convicted of the murder of George Davenport in October of that year. Iowa newspapers reported that Easterly and Webb had achieved a "splendid likeness" of the men shortly before their execution. Easterly and Webb continued touring on the Mississippi and Missouri rivers for several months before spending the winter of 1846-47 in Liberty, Missouri.

The only known photograph of the first St. Charles Hotel in New Orleans, built to be the world's finest, was taken by Easterly ca. 1847.

The following spring, Easterly and Webb went their separate ways with Easterly traveling on his own to St. Louis. He soon became popular for his portraits of prominent residents and visiting celebrities which were displayed in a temporary gallery on Glasgow Row. One of these portraits was that of Chief Keokuk taken March 1847. He also took a daguerreotype of a lightning bolt, one of the first recorded "instantaneous" photographic images, while in St. Louis. This was later recorded in the Iowa Sentinel as an "Astonishing Achievement in Art". Before returning to Vermont in August 1847, the St. Louis Reveille described his as an "unrivaled daguerreotypist".

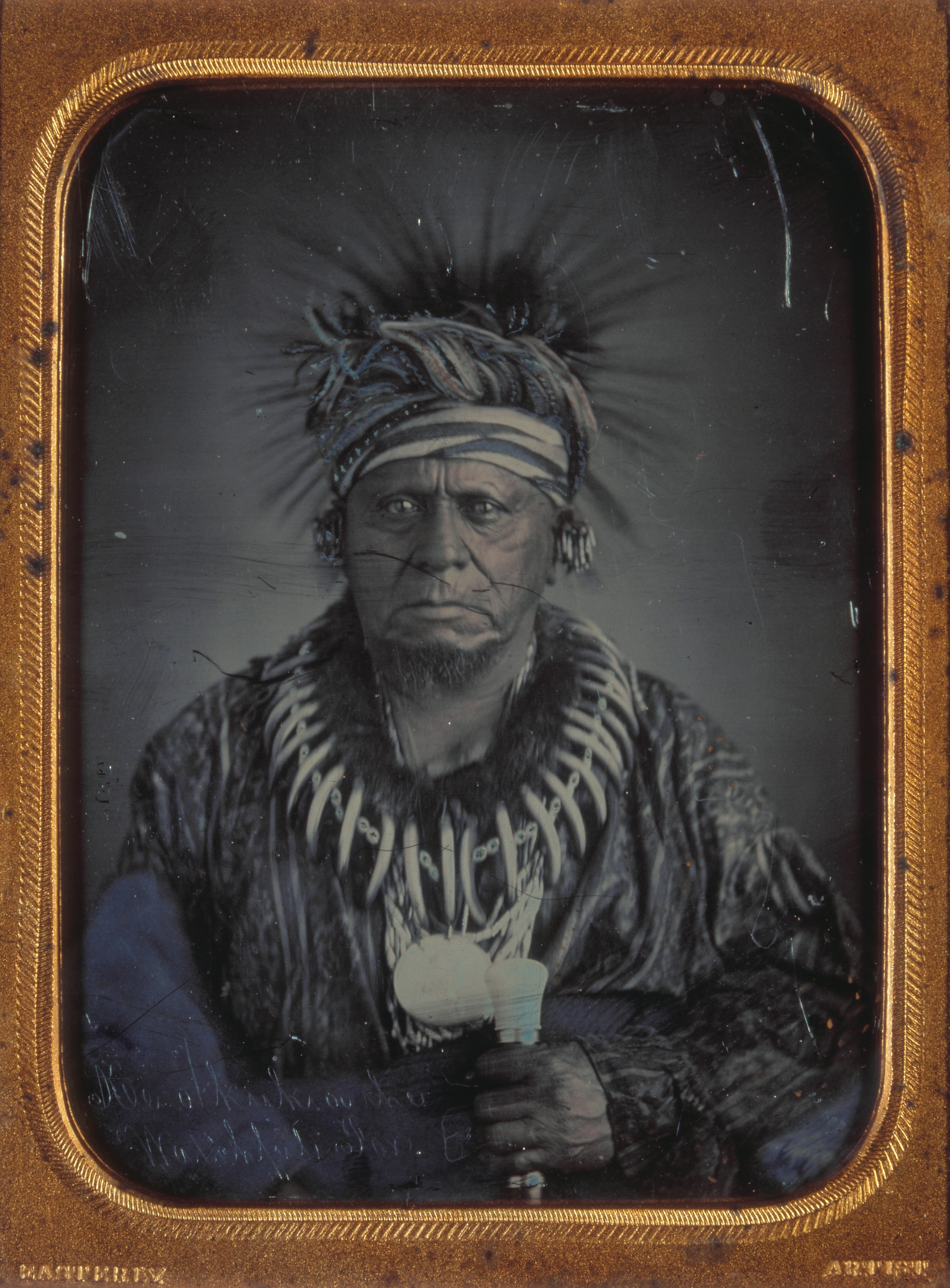
Keokuk, or the Watchful Fox. Daguerreotype by Thomas Easterly, 1847. From Missouri Historical Society, St. Louis

He was brought back to Missouri by John Ostrander, founder of the first daguerreotype gallery in St. Louis, in early 1848. Preparing for an extended "tour of the south", Ostringer asked Easterly to manage his portrait gallery. Easterly would continue running the gallery when Ostringer died a short time later. Many of his unique streetscapes depicting mid-19th-century urban life were taken from the windows of Ostringer's gallery. In June 1850, he married schoolteacher Anna Miriam Bailey and settled in St. Louis permanently. During the 1860s, improvements in photographic development caused daguerreotypes to become out of fashion. Easterly refused to acknowledge these changes believing the highly detailed daguerreotypes were far superior in terms of beauty or permanence urging the public to "save your old daguerreotypes for you will never see their like again".

During the next decade, both his health and financial situation worsened. Despite the declining interest for pictures on silver, he was able to maintain his gallery until it burned in a fire in 1865. He was forced to move to a smaller location and continued working in near obscurity until his death in St. Louis on March 12, 1882. He had suffered from a long illness and partial paralysis in his final years and is thought to have been caused by prolonged exposure to mercury, one of the key ingredients used in the daguerreotype process.

After his death, his wife sold most of his personal collection to John Scholton, another noted St. Louis photographer. The Scholton family eventually donated the plates to the Missouri Historical Society where they remained for nearly a century before being rediscovered during the 1980s by art scholars studying pre-American Civil War photography. With over 680 plates, the Missouri Historical Society's Thomas Easterly Collection is one of the largest collections of daguerreotypes by a single artist in the United States.
