= Edward Bonney =

American detective (1807–1864)

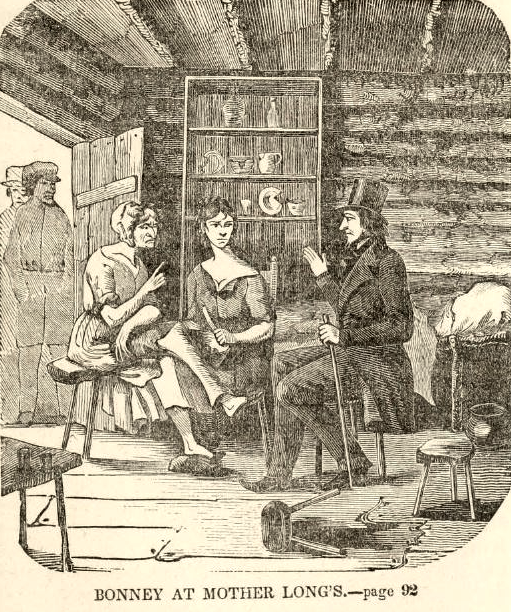
- Illustration of Bonney (right) in 1845
- Born: Edward William Bonney; August 26, 1807; Essex County, New York, US
- Died: February 4, 1864 (aged 56); Chicago, Illinois, US
- Cause of death: war disability
- Resting place: Bonneyville Cemetery, Bristol, Elkhart County, Indiana
- Occupations: Miller; hotel keeper; city planner; counterfeiter; church officer; livery stable keeper; bounty hunter; private detective; postmaster; merchant; soldier; author
- Employer(s): U.S. government, self-employed
- Military career
- Allegiance: United States of America; Illinois; Church of Jesus Christ of Latter Day Saints; Nauvoo Legion (Mormon militia companies) of Illinois State Militia (1840-1845); United States of America; United States Army; Union Army
- Rank: aide-de-camp to Lieutenant General Joseph Smith (June 18, 1844-June 27, 1844); private (August 18, 1862-December 23, 1863)
- Units: Captain John S. Williams, Company G, 127th Illinois Volunteer Infantry Regiment
- Conflicts: American Civil War: Mississippi River Campaign (1862-1863); Siege of Vicksburg (1863)

Edward William Bonney (August 26, 1807 – February 4, 1864) was an American miller, hotelier, urban planner, counterfeiter, livery stable keeper, bounty hunter, detective, postmaster, merchant, soldier, and author. He is best known for his undercover work in exposing the "Banditti of the Prairie", resulting from his investigation of the torture-murder of noted Illinois pioneer and frontiersman Colonel George Davenport.

== Early life ==
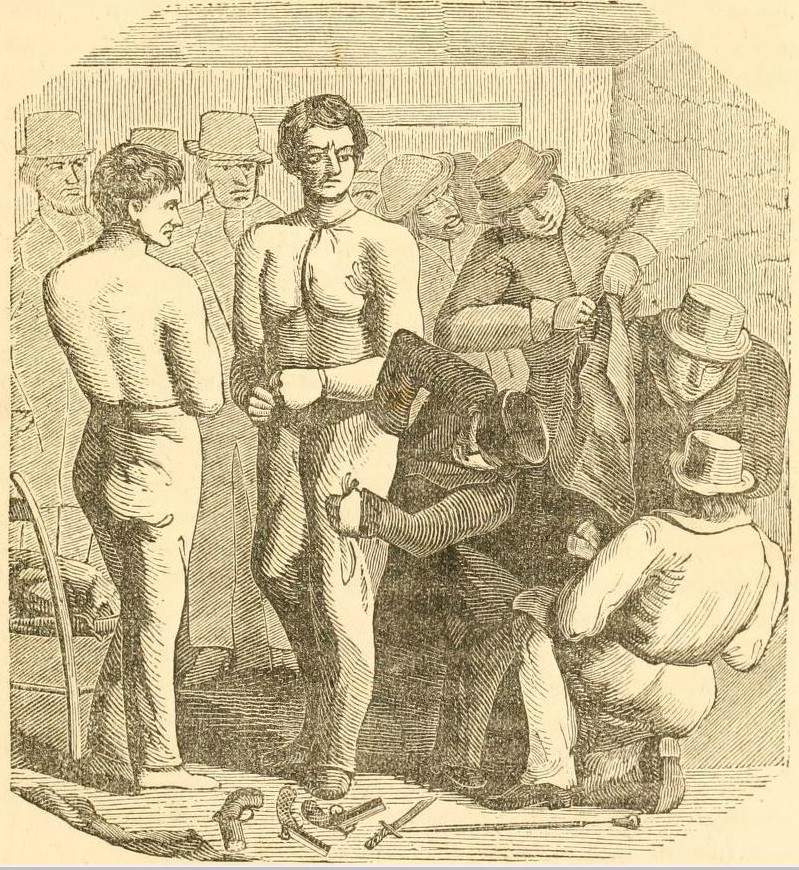
Bonney (center) being searched by Indiana law enforcement

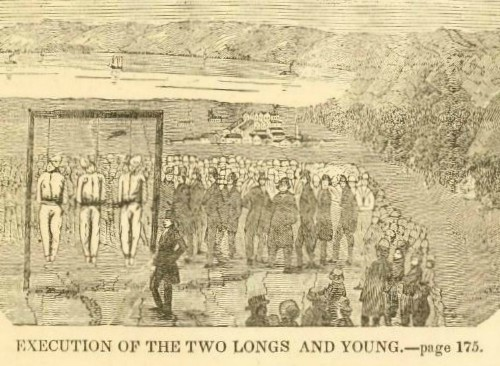
Bonney (in top hat and dark suit) at the 1846 execution of the Long brothers and Granville Young

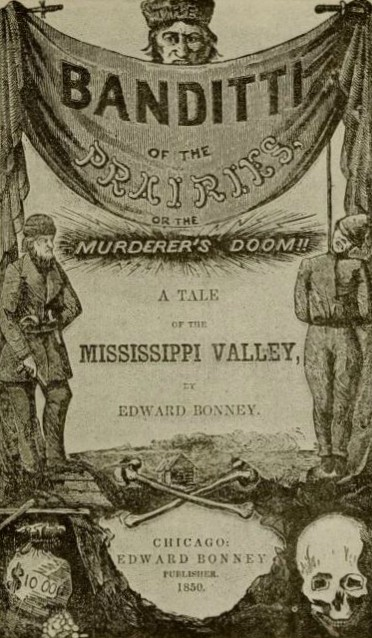
Title page of the first edition of Banditti Of The Prairies

Edward William Bonney was born in Essex County, New York. His father, Jethro May Bonney, a soldier, was stationed near the border of Lower Canada (present-day Quebec) at the time of his birth. "Capt. Jethro May Bonney." His mother was Lucinda Laurana Webster, a relative of Daniel Webster. In 1816 the family moved to Cortland, New York.

== Founding of Bonneyville, Indiana ==
Edward Bonney got married and moved to the frontier, in Elkhart County, Indiana, in 1835, with the intent of creating the city of Bonneyville, named after himself. In 1839, he was charged and fined for assault. Bonney built the Bonneyville Mill for grinding grain into flour and also built a saw mill. When Bonneyville failed to grow rapidly from a sleepy farm town into a bustling city, Bonney sold most of the 80 acres he had purchased for his planned city in 1841. He later bought the Goshen Hotel in Bonneyville and not long after sold the hotel and both his mills.

== Arrest for counterfeiting ==
Bonney was arrested on suspicion of counterfeiting on July 9, 1842, along with Henry Kellogg and Obadiah Cooley, in Gustavus Township, Trumbull County, Ohio. Authorities found "about half a bushel of base coin, half dollars and Mexican dollars.” in their log cabin shop. At his August 4 arraignment, he pled not guilty and posted bail of $1000 on the surety of John Adams, a resident of Gustavus Township. But he failed to show up for his November 1, 1842 trial in Ohio. On January 30, 1844, the state of Ohio had issued a warrant to extradite Bonney from Indiana to stand trial on the 1842 counterfeiting charges. When Bonney fled Indiana for the Mormon city of Nauvoo, Illinois, in February 1844 he may have been just ahead of Joshua S. Smith, who bore the extradition warrant.

== Mormon affiliation and offices held in Nauvoo, Illinois ==
Bonney eventually "fiddle-footed his way" to Nauvoo, Illinois, in 1844, a Latter Day Saint community on the Mississippi River, where he and his wife decided to settle. Between March 14 and April 11, 1844, he was chosen by Joseph Smith, the founder and leader of the Church of Jesus Christ of Latter Day Saints, who was a friend, to be a member of the Mormon theocratic "Council of Fifty. He was one of three non-members on the Mormon Council that made important government and community decisions for the Nauvoo Saints. Bonney was chosen by Smith to be his aide-de-camp in the Nauvoo Legion from June 18 to June 27, until the murder of Smith.

After the murders of Joseph and Hyrum Smith in Carthage, Illinois, in 1844, Bonney, who as a non-Mormon was considered an outsider by the Nauvoo church elders, lost his influential status among the Council of Fifty. He was released from his Council duties on February 4, 1845, and he left for Iowa. Bonney continued to be involved in fighting against criminal elements both outside and within the Nauvoo Mormon community. Bonney was also particularly antagonistic of the Mormon Danites.

== Bounty hunter and amateur detective in Montrose, Iowa Territory ==
In 1845, Edward Bonney moved across the Mississippi River from Nauvoo to Montrose, Lee County, Iowa Territory, now Montrose, Lee County, Iowa, where he operated a livery stable. During the next several years, he worked with law enforcement agencies, in Montrose and Lee County, to hunt down various criminals, in the area, as a sort of freelance bounty hunter. Bonney gradually attained a reputation as a skilled detective, adept at "piecing together odd bits of information and rumor", although he was often subject to suspicion and persecution for his Mormonism.

== Investigations of the Banditti of the Prairie and the murderers of Colonel Davenport ==
The criminal investigations of Edward Bonney into the criminal activity occurring along the vast mid-river area of the Mississippi between 1843-1848, attributed to the organization known as the "Banditti of the Prairie", were claimed by Bonney to being carried out by outlaws who considered themselves "self-styled" Mormons conveniently seeking refuge in Nauvoo as persecuted "Saints" where they headquartered their criminal activities unhindered by law enforcement. It was not until going undercover within the organization, posing as a counterfeiter, that he was able to connect the gang to the torture-murder of Colonel George Davenport. After a four-month chase through Illinois, Missouri, Indiana and Ohio, he finally brought most of his murderers to justice. Of the eight men taken into custody, three of the four men involved in Davenport's murder, Granville Young and brothers John and Aaron Long, were convicted and hanged. The fourth man, Robert H. Birch, agreed to turn state's evidence and later escaped from jail. After learning "crime doesn't pay" Birch finally became an honest man and twelve years later, was one of the founders of the Pinos Altos gold mining camp in 1858 in the New Mexico Territory.

== Publication of the Banditti of the Prairies ==
In 1850, Edward Bonney wrote and published a sensational account of the Banditti of the Prairie, titled The Banditti of the Prairies: or, The murderer's doom, a tale of Mississippi Valley and the Far West, which was an immediate success and went through eight editions until 1858. Although, it is thought Bonney may have been assisted by a ghost writer, most likely Henry A. Clark, the book, though poorly written, by an amateur writer, is considered remarkably accurate, when compared with official court records and other official evidence. The Bonney book was not specifically anti-Mormon, but reflected his criticism of organized religion.

== Life after Colonel Davenport trial ==
Following the trial and execution of Granville Young and the Long brothers, Edward Bonney returned to Lee County, Iowa Territory the following year and was indicted by the local district court for murder and later acquitted. Bonney lived in Rock Island, Illinois for a time and before moving to Chicago in Prospect Park in DuPage County where he was appointed as the second postmaster of the town. before settling in Aurora, Illinois around 1852.

== Detective in Chicago ==
.

== American Civil War service ==
In 1862, Edward Bonney was living in Chicago, Cook County, Illinois and continued working, as a bounty hunter and detective. In the same year, during the height of the American Civil War, Bonney, at age 56, enlisted into Captain John S. Williams Company G, 127th Illinois Volunteer Infantry Regiment, of the Union Army and participated in General Grant's Mississippi River Campaign, which included the Siege of Vicksburg, Mississippi, where he received a paralyzing leg wound. He was sent to the U.S. Marine Hospital, in St. Louis, Missouri, to recover from his severe wound.

== Death ==
Private Edward Bonney was medically discharged, from the Union Army, on December 23, 1863 and went back to Chicago, dying on February 4, 1864, as the result of his crippling leg wound. Bonney was buried in Bonneyville Cemetery, Bristol, Elkhart County, Indiana, near the mill and town that he once owned.

== See also ==
- Joseph Naper (city planner)
