= Banditti of the Prairie =

Group of loose-knit outlaw gangs, during the early-mid-19th century

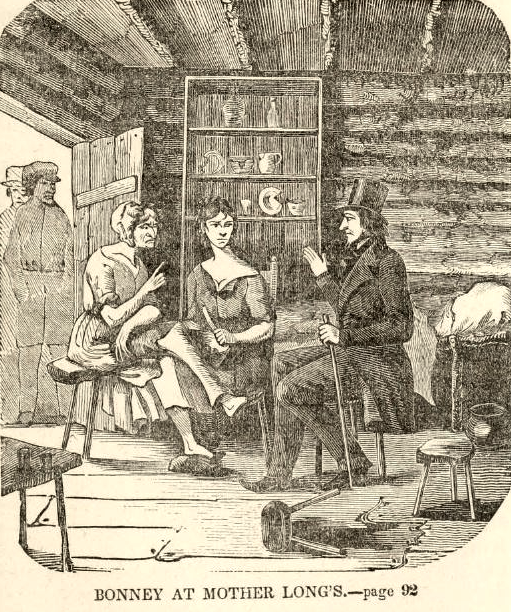
- An illustration of Edward Bonney, the bounty hunter and amateur detective who in 1845 posed as a counterfeiter (who ironically had been arrested for counterfeiting himself a few years earlier) to infiltrate a faction of the "Banditti of the Prairie" and track down the infamous murderers of Colonel George Davenport: Bonney wrote the 1850 book The Banditti of the Prairies: or, The murderer's doom, a tale of Mississippi Valley and the Far West
- Years active: 1830s-1850
- Territory: Primarily Lee, DeKalb, Ogle, Winnebago, Rock Island, Jo Daviess, and Hancock counties, in Illinois as well as the states of Iowa, Indiana, and Ohio
- Ethnicity: European-American
- Membership (est.): ?
- Criminal activities: House burglary, fencing stolen property, horse and cattle theft, stagecoach and highway robbery, counterfeiting, murder

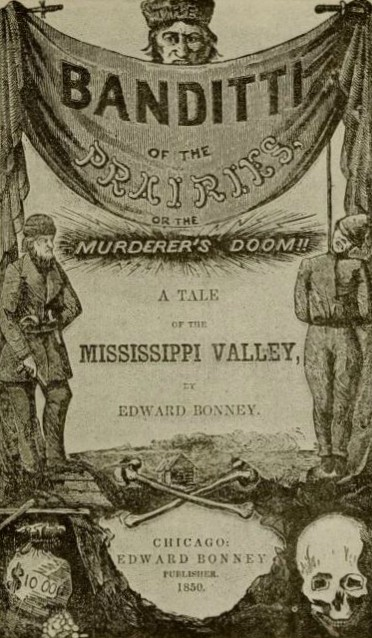
Title page of the 1850 first-edition publishing of the Banditti Of The Prairies by Edward Bonney

The Banditti of the Prairie, also known as The Banditti, Prairie Pirates, Prairie Bandits, and Pirates of the Prairie, in the U.S. states of Illinois, Indiana, and Ohio and the Territory of Iowa, were a group of loose-knit outlaw gangs, during the early to mid-19th century. Though bands of roving criminals were common in many parts of Illinois, the counties of Lee, DeKalb, Ogle, and Winnebago were especially plagued by them. The new crime wave in the region of the frontier Midwest may have occurred following the crackdown on Southern outlaws by the rising vigilante-regulator movement and the breakup of the criminal syndicate of John A. Murrell and his gang, the "Mystic Clan", in the Southern United States. In 1841, the escalating pattern of house burglary, horse and cattle theft, stagecoach and highway robbery, counterfeiting and murder associated with the Banditti had come to a head in Ogle County. As the crimes continued, local citizens formed bands of vigilantes known as Regulators. A clash between the Banditti and the Regulators in Ogle County near Oregon, Illinois resulted in the outlaws' demise and decreased Banditti activity and violent crime within the county.

Banditti and Regulator activity continued well after the lynching that took place in 1841. Crimes continued, committed by both sides, across northern and central Illinois. The Banditti were involved in other notable events, as well, including the 1845 torture-murder of merchant Colonel George Davenport, the namesake of Davenport, Iowa. Edward Bonney, an amateur detective who hunted down and brought to justice the killers, wrote of his exploits and alibi, which were recounted in his book Banditti of the Prairies, or the Murderer's Doom!!: A Tale of the Mississippi Valley, published in Chicago in 1850. The outlaw gangs also continued to be active in Lee and Winnebago Counties following the events in Oregon.

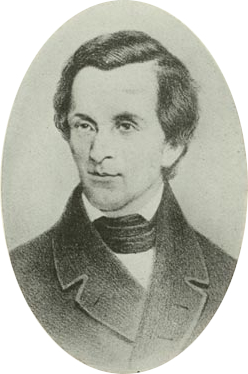
Illinois Governor Thomas Ford as a younger man was instrumental in helping to destroy the dominating influence of the Banditti of the Prairie in Ogle County, Illinois

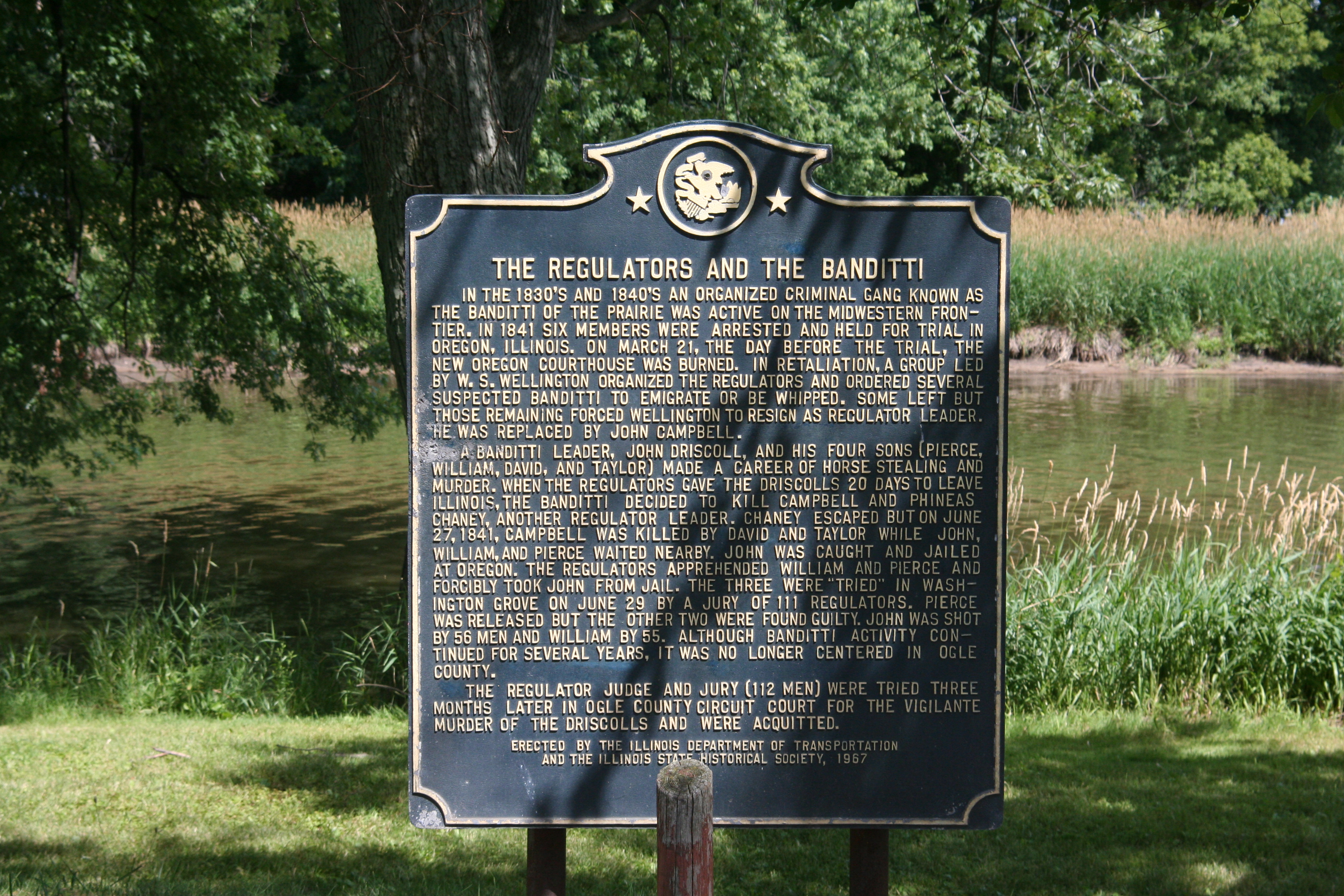
The Regulators and the Banditti, an Illinois state historical marker documenting Regulator vigilante activities in driving out an Ogle County, Illinois, faction of the Banditti of the Prairie, along the Rock River, near Byron, Illinois, on state highway, Route 2

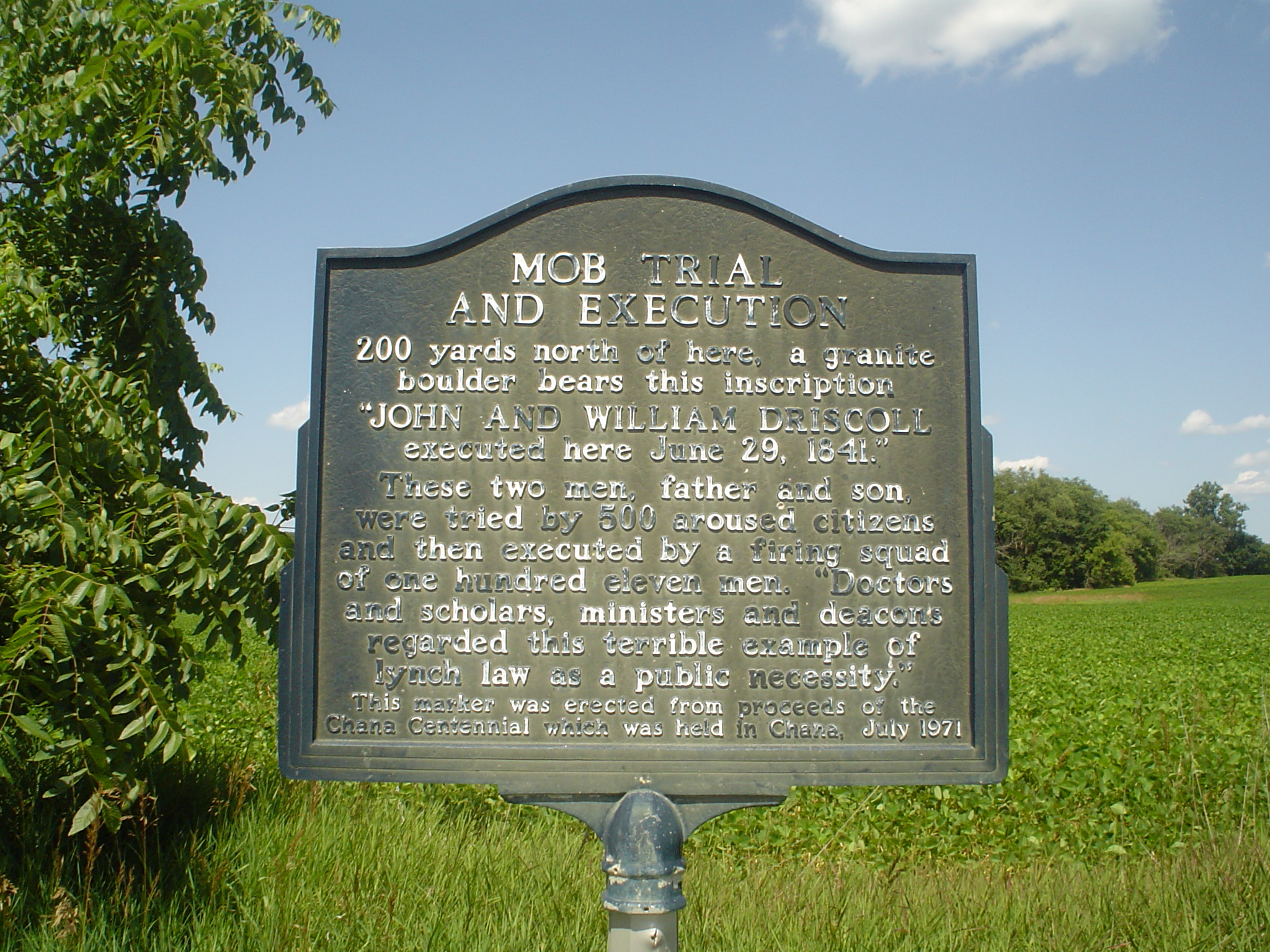
Mob Trial and Execution, an Illinois historical marker near the mob lynching site where the Banditti "prairie pirates", father and son John and William Driscoll of the Driscoll gang, were tried by an illegal Regulator court of 500 concerned citizens for murder and shot to death by a firing squad of 111 men

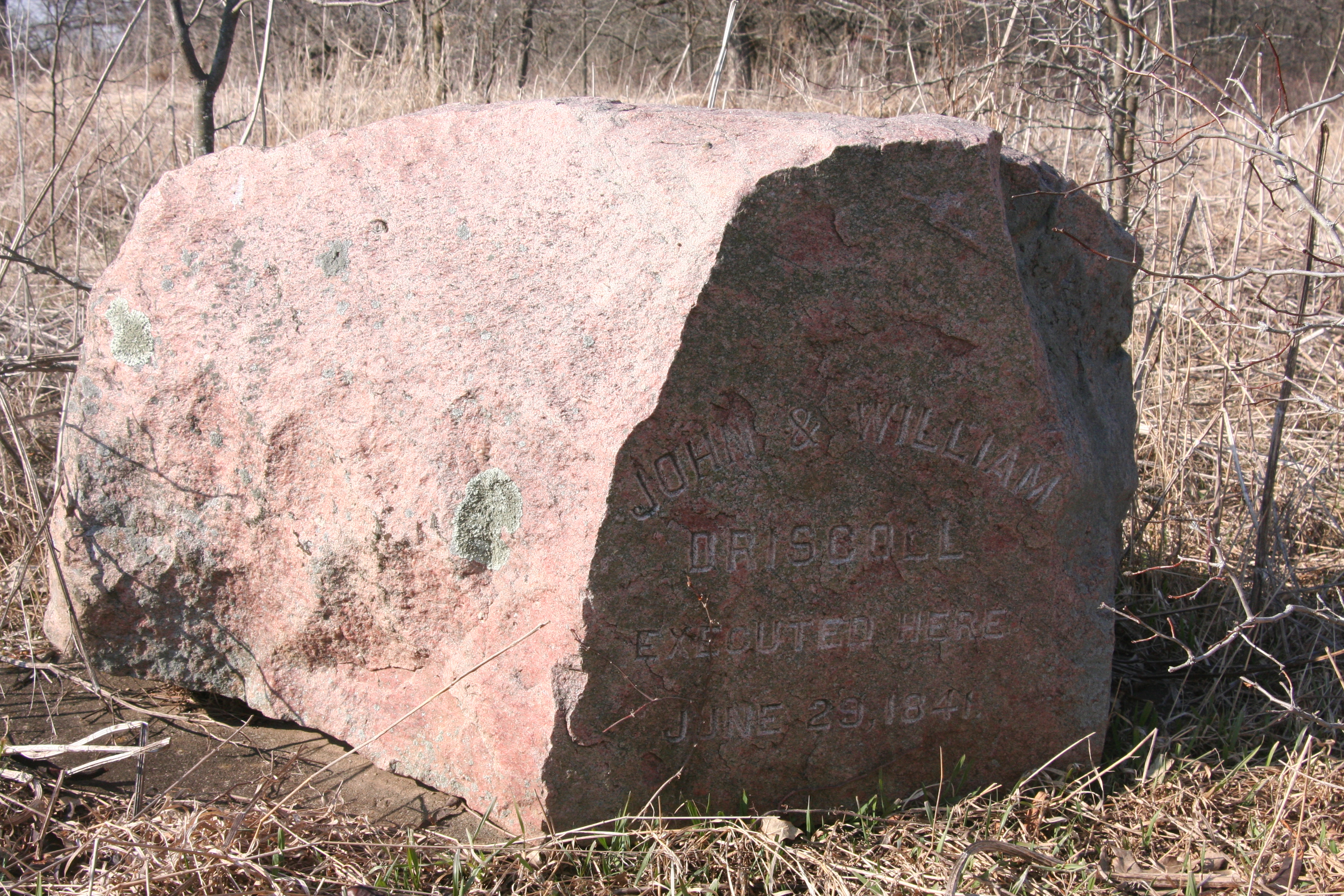
A rock slab marker of the approximate location of the Regulator firing-squad execution site, in Ogle County, Illinois, of two members of "The Banditti" belonging to the local Driscoll gang. It reads "John & William Driscoll Executed Here June 29, 1841"

== Banditti influence ==
The "Prairie Bandits" were active across northern Illinois, especially in Lee, Ogle, Winnebago, and DeKalb Counties, from 1835 until the events leading to their ultimate demise began on March 21, 1841. The bandits wielded considerable influence in the area collectively known as the Rock River Valley, following the influx of immigrants after the Black Hawk War of 1832, the last Indian war in Illinois. The Banditti posed a far greater threat, for a much longer period, than the exaggerated paranoia of the two-month Native American conflict. Former Illinois Governor Thomas Ford wrote in History of Illinois:

... the northern part of the State was not destitute of its organized bands of rogues engaged in murders, robberies, horsestealing, and in making and passing counterfeit money. These rogues were scattered all over the north: but the most of them were located in the counties of Ogle, Winnebago, Lee and DeKalb. In the county of Ogle they were so numerous, strong, and organized that they could not be convicted for their crimes.

== Banditti activity ==
In Lee County, Illinois, the Banditti also had enough power to get away unnoticed. The group had enough allies that they were scattered throughout the county. The connections the Banditti had around the county made illegal activities such as counterfeiting and dealing in and concealing stolen property easy to perpetrate. At one time, every township officer in Lee County reportedly was a member of the Banditti. Acts of theft were carried on in defiance of authority. Citizens were threatened when they tried to seek redress from the thieves.

In the end, the Prairie Bandits' activity in Ogle and Lee Counties became more than area residents were willing to withstand. In Ogle County, the crimes that occurred in March 1841 resulted in a kangaroo court, which culminated with the lynching of two Banditti near Oregon, Illinois. In nearby Lee County, a Vigilance Committee was formed by men from throughout Lee County, and especially Lee Center Township took an active role in suppressing the Banditti activity.

=== Ogle County ===
Beginning with the events on March 21, 1841, violence and retribution escalated in the area around the Ogle County seat of Oregon. Illinois, still frontier in 1841, was settled by large numbers of migrants after the Black Hawk War. The settlers were followed to the area by a criminal element. The Banditti of the Prairie were part of the crime problem that plagued much of northern Illinois. As such, the concerned citizens of Ogle County organized and eventually took the law into their own hands.

On March 21, 1841, six members of the Banditti were arrested on charges of counterfeiting. They were held at the Ogle County Jail in the city of Oregon. That night, a fire broke out in the newly completed courthouse, which was to be used for the first time the next day. The fire, set by the Banditti, was meant as a diversion to facilitate the escape of the apprehended gang members. The diversion failed; though the courthouse burned to the ground, the jail remained intact. The court records concerning the case had been safely concealed in the home of the court clerk. Ford, who sat as Ogle County circuit judge at the time, reconvened court at a new location, and the trial for the accused counterfeiters went on as planned.

The jury, as was common in Ogle County at the time, had been infiltrated by one of the Banditti, who subsequently refused to convict the accused. The other jurors persuaded the rogue juror to convict by threatening to lynch him in the jury room if he failed to agree with the majority opinion. The Banditti juror capitulated, and three of the accused were convicted. The convicts, however, soon escaped and avoided their sentences.

In April, 1841, the community of Oregon, and Ogle County in general, had reached a boiling point. During that month, a group of citizens, possibly acting under direct counsel from Ford, met at a schoolhouse in White Rock Township, and formed an organization aimed at driving the outlaws out of the county. Membership in the new group grew quickly, soon numbering in the hundreds, and copycat chapters sprang up all over the Rock River Valley. These bands of citizen vigilantes were most often known as "Regulators". They were also called "lynching clubs", and in Lee County, one group was known as the "Associations for the Furtherance of the Cause of Justice".

The Regulators in Ogle County began by whipping two horse thieves, one of whom joined the group after the incident. The first Ogle County Regulator captain, W.S. Wellington, stepped aside after his grist mill was destroyed and his horse tortured and killed in April 1841. The new captain, John Campbell, was a resident of White Rock Township. The local Banditti were the Driscoll family and members of the Driscoll Gang. At the head was John Driscoll, who had migrated from Ohio in 1835 with his four grown sons, William, David, Pierce, and Taylor. The Driscolls lived on Killbuck Creek in northeast Ogle County. Driscoll and his son Taylor had both been convicted of arson while they lived in Ohio.

Campbell's ascension to the lead Regulator post was met with hostility from the Driscoll camp. William Driscoll immediately sent Campbell a letter offering to kill him. Campbell responded in kind; he assembled 200 Regulators, and marched to the Driscoll home. A small group of Banditti had gathered at the Driscoll homestead, but seeing they were outnumbered, they fled, only to return with the DeKalb County sheriff and other authorities in tow. The sheriff and his companions did not see the events as the outlaws had hoped; they sided with the vigilantes, and the Driscolls promised to leave within twenty days. Instead of leaving, the Driscolls and the other Banditti held a meeting in which they determined that Campbell and his fellow Regulator, Phineas Chaney, had to be murdered.

==== Execution ====
Nearly three months later, on June 25, 1841, an attempt was made to kill Chaney. Two days passed, and on June 27, David Driscoll and his brother Taylor attacked Campbell at his farm. David fired the single, fatal shot. Campbell's son, Martin, then 13, fired at the Driscolls with a shotgun, but the weapon failed to go off.

The account that stated David and Taylor Driscoll were the gunmen came from Campbell's wife. Despite this claim, hoofprints at the scene of the crime indicated that an additional three horses had been there. The Regulators followed these prints back to the Driscoll home. Once there, accompanied by Ogle County Sheriff William T. Ward, the angry group confronted John Driscoll. After questioning by Ward and his accompanying mob, the sheriff was satisfied that John Driscoll was involved in Campbell's murder and arrested him "on suspicion of being accessory to the murder". While David and Taylor Driscoll, the gunmen, fled that fateful day, William and Pierce Driscoll were arrested by a group of Regulators from Rockford.

The Regulator court was convened at "Stephenson's Mill" in Washington Grove, Illinois, because of the courthouse fire in March, 1841. The court was organized, witnesses gathered, and proceedings went forward. A crowd gathered at the mill, estimated to be as many as 500. At this point, Sheriff Ward appealed to have the Driscolls returned to his custody. E.S. Leland presided over the makeshift court as judge, a position he later held legitimately in Ottawa, Illinois. Leland directed those present who were Regulators to form a circle; 120 men initially stepped forward; nine were dismissed as not being "real" Regulators. The 111 men remaining formed the "jury".

On June 29, 1841, the vigilante trial began, and William Driscoll admitted to telling his brother to kill Campbell, but only "in jest". His father, John, denied vehemently that he had anything to do with the murder, though he did admit to stealing numerous horses. Pierce Driscoll was released from custody when no evidence was found linking him to the crime. At the trial's end, the guilty verdict was described as "almost unanimous"; the Driscolls were immediately sentenced to be hanged on the spot. The Driscolls refused to be hanged and instead requested that they be shot. Before the execution was carried out, William Driscoll confessed to six murders; John confessed to nothing. The Regulators then assembled a large firing squad, and prepared to carry out the execution. The Regulators divided themselves into two separate squads, one for each man, of 55 and 56 riflemen. The line of 56 executioners shot first John Driscoll. William, by this time trembling, was gunned down next by the line of 55 Regulators.

The description in the 1909 Historical Encyclopedia of Illinois was somewhat more tame:

[the Driscolls were] . . . led out, and shot, and then the other was led out, and after being shown the body of his dead relative, he was exhorted to confess that he had committed the crime charged against him. This he refused to do, but acknowledged that he had committed other crimes for which he deserved death.

The lynching of the Driscolls did not spell the end of the Regulators, nor the Banditti, but it did serve to greatly decrease Banditti activity in Ogle County.

=== Other Banditti activity ===
Though the Banditti continued to plague areas of northern Illinois, they were largely eradicated from Ogle County following the lynching of the Driscolls. Both the Banditti and the Regulators, though, continued to be active. In Winnebago County, in early July 1841, the offices of the Rock River Express were ransacked, an early predecessor to the Rockford Register Star, the daily newspaper of Rockford, Illinois. The offices were likely trashed in response to a scathing editorial published by the Express speaking out against the vigilante action taken by the Regulators.

Banditti crimes continued well into the 1840s. One of the most shocking incidents, outside of the murderous crimes of the Driscoll gang in Ogle, to be attributed to the Banditti was the callous murder of Colonel George Davenport at his home on the grounds of Rock Island Arsenal. On July 4, 1845, Colonel Davenport was assaulted in his home by Banditti men who thought he had a fortune in his safe. Beaten and left for dead, he survived long enough to give a full description of the criminals before he died that night. An amateur detective named Edward Bonney tracked down the killers and brought them to justice. Five men were charged with the murder of George Davenport, and all but one, who escaped before the trial, were hanged for the murder. Three more men were charged with being accessories to the murder. One man was sentenced to life in prison, but escaped and was killed three months later; one man served one year in prison; and the charges were dropped against the third man, who left the area.

In Lee County, Illinois, the Banditti were most active in 1843-1850, after the lynching in Ogle. During that period, crime and gang operations were rampant throughout the Mississippi Valley, but Lee County, like its neighboring northern Illinois counties, had consistent activity. Near the Lee County village of Franklin Grove, a brutal double murder was committed in 1848. On May 20, 1848, area resident Joshua Wingert, while searching through the grove 2 mi (3 km) west of town for his cattle, came upon a small log hut. Inside, he discovered the bodies of two men, killed with their own axe. One of the men was nearly decapitated, and the other had a large gash across his forehead. The assumed motive was robbery, as the hut was ransacked and bloody fingerprints were all about the small building. The Banditti perpetrator or perpetrators were never apprehended.

Also in Lee County, the Banditti were active in and around Inlet Grove. In June 1844, the group carried out a daring robbery of a Mr. Haskell. Haskell's residence was robbed by masked men in the midst of a summer thunderstorm. The perpetrators entered Haskell's bedroom while his wife and he were asleep. The robbers dragged a trunk of money out from underneath the sleeping Haskells' bed undetected, much of the noise they made probably drowned out by thunder. The Haskells did not discover they had been the victims of a robbery until the next morning.

== See also ==
- Killing of Joseph Smith
