= Nonda =

- Born: Epaminondas Papadopoulos; October 11, 1922
- Died: October 30, 2005 (aged 83)

NONDA (born Epaminondas Papadopoulos in Athens on October 11, 1922; died October 30, 2005) was a leading Greek artist of the school of Paris. He was one of the handful of Greek artists who received scholarships from the French government to attend the Ecole De Beaux Arts in the late 40s. He was represented primarily by the Galerie Charpentier in the 50s and early 60s and was well known for his outdoor installations under the Pont Neuf Bridge in 1960s Paris as well as his unconventional use of cow's blood as a medium. His work is often associated with large scale figurative and abstract expressionist canvases, and monumental sculpture in post-war Paris.

== 1940s The early years ==
Nonda studied drawing and painting under Spiros Vikatos, who encouraged him in the classical tradition and praised his particular gift in portraiture. His first works were portraits of his family, bold nudes, as well as landscapes, seascapes. Many of these works survived the destruction of his atelier in Athens during the Second World War. While his temperament was clearly precocious, his early paintings were deeply influenced by his interest in El Greco, Ingres, Delacroix and Frans Hals among others, and showed a great respect for the masters. In 1947, he left Greece on a scholarship to the Ecole des Beaux-Arts in Paris where he studied in the ateliers Narbonne and Le Magny. Once in Paris, Nonda began to develop the image of the archetypal “ Femme Parisenne” (“Parisian Woman”) which was to remain a source of inspiration throughout his life's work.

== The Nudes--- Censored works 1952 ==
Nonda's first major show was in 1952 at the Parnassus Gallery in Athens. He exhibited a series of explicit nudes, violent, and highly erotic, crammed with images of Paris and its more liberated women, as well as the series of Femmes Chapeautées which would be shown the same year at the Zaharias gallery. The Parnassus show generated an immediate scandal. Alongside the academic early work and the expressive cardboard models of Montmartre tenements, he hung a series of huge canvases depicting the end of love and youth, the sexual perversion of the misogynist, lesbian orgies, and the frightening satyr-lover figure which he used to portray himself. The largest works were over three meters tall, executed on canvas in bold oil and completely dominated the space. Interspersed were the smaller nudes in plaster frames. The opening was so shocking to certain Athenians that the police, urged by the board of directors at the Parnassus venue, immediately ordered the show closed and padlocked the doors. The charge was “offense of public decency”. Like Modigliani's first one-man show in Paris, it had reached the classic impasse, the clash of a conservative authority with an independent and free thinking artist. In a sarcastic and historically loaded gesture, he collected an armful of fresh fig leaves from the suburbs and pinned a leaf over the genitalia of each of the figures. Others, considered even more offensive, were veiled with black curtains. With this new, somewhat comic amendment, the show reopened and as one would expect, the scandal generated a huge amount of attention by creating one of the first real censorship issues for a Greek artist in the Post war period. The event was unprecedented in Athens, and the images, as well as the artist's response, captured the interest of the city. Here was a young artist reported to have made great advances in Paris, and commanded the respect of more traditional artists such as Galanis and Vikatos, but with his first real show had managed to scandalize the city with art that was deemed by many to be dangerous, pornographic and “degenerate.” Thousands of viewers stood in lines that circled the block on Christou Lada Street to see the infamous nudes and the renaissance style “cover up”. Even the controversial King Constantine and Queen Frederika paid a special visit to the show to view the paintings. The Athenian newspapers were polarized on this issue of censorship and crammed with vitriolic letters by academics and other well known poets and writers as a drawn out debate concerning the art in question commenced. In an open letter published in the national paper Nonda writes, “…my soul is filled with bitterness because I have found “Art on the Run” in the proverbial “City of Art and Culture”, I raise protest against the cultural and artistic circles in Athens.” Spiros Vikatos, his former teacher in the Academy, stood by the young painter’s work and supported him against the attacks, as did other more progressive artists and writers such as the novelist Stratis Mirivilis, who wrote a heavily satiric article about the censors in the leading Athens newspaper. These first shows in Athens, although scandalous, had also received rave reviews. There were articles in all the national Greek newspapers praising the remarkable Greek painter who was to “triumph in Paris” but the fiasco concerning his allegedly pornographic art was the beginning of a troubled relationship with the city of his birth. Nonda was to prove difficult for the Athenian circles.

== 1950s postwar Paris ==
During the 1950s, Nonda lived and worked in Paris, drawing inspiration from areas such as Pigalle, Place Blanche, and Montmartre. His work from this period became more expressionistic, reflecting both personal experiences and evolving artistic confidence. He began experimenting with unconventional materials, including charcoal and other textured media, leading to paintings that critics have described as “fresco-like.”

Nonda also explored a wide range of surfaces and techniques, combining oils with materials such as sand and wood. This experimentation marked the beginning of his sustained interest in mixed-media approaches. In later works from the decade, he introduced recurring motifs of strong female figures, often contrasted with depictions of Parisian urban life. Some compositions featured symbolic imagery such as the “woman and bull,” referencing themes drawn from mythology, ancient art traditions, and African influences.

== In the streets ==
In the early 1950s, Nonda worked nights in factories and tailor shops in order to support himself and buy materials. The streets surrounding Montmartre as well as the outskirts of Paris were overflowing with poor workers, prostitutes, musicians and street peddlers. During this time he produced a series of paintings executed with strong, sweeping brushstrokes which captured the sadness and destitution of this marginal society. Their faces expose emotion and implore the viewer to understand. Often depicted partially nude, the figures expose their humanity in its totality.

One of the paintings from this series, “The Musicians”, which was exhibited in the Salon des Indépendants in 1954 at the Grand Palais, was analyzed in the book NONDA, L’Odyssée d’un Peintre by Georges Picard. In the book, Nonda explains

“…look at their feet…I tried to express this in the simplest ways…and I retained their characters…even while deforming their poor bodies…I pitied them… believe me…they look like creatures from another earth but I kept their psychological traits…The woman keeps her coquetterie of a woman lost…the violinist is romantic in his way...his tilted head begs for pity of sorts…while the blind one is devoid of confidence…this is how I translate them…musicians who played their part in a shady café-concert and went their way…their sad misfortune exposed.”

Picard closes the discussion by saying that Nonda essentially paints “ the force and the sentiments which exude profoundly from the faces, the bodies, the lights.” He also describes the process of his own portrait being drawn, as well as a series of extended meditations on selected works, notably the coveted “Nativity” which the artist refused to sell, and a portrait of a beautiful young dancer from the Paris Ballet. Wherever he went, Nonda seemed to exude an aura of passionate intensity which intoxicated those around him. He held firmly to an artistic integrity that one might trace back to his father's influence as a fine tailor. His father had been known to rip apart suits in which one stitch was misplaced by a worker---this sense of incredible dedication and discipline to a craft carried over from his work into his life. The energy of this devotion and confidence in his art could also lead to fury at the opportunistic dealings of gallerists or other “fashionable” artists. This independence also resulted in decisions which were harmful to his career, such as the invitation from the Art Institute of Chicago, which he left unanswered, and his refusal to court critics and art dealers---but the force of his work and his sense of artistic freedom was very much linked to this uncompromising stance.

Francis Carco had always been involved with painters. In his youth he had befriended Vlaminck, Derain, Van Dongen, Utrillo, Pascin and numerous masters. He owned many of their early works, and soon bought paintings from Nonda. Carco would also help him show his paintings to the large galleries by introduction, and a letter, hailing the talent of the young painter would insure his induction to the School of Paris and a contract with the coveted Galerie Charpentier whose painters exhibited yearly in the salons at the Grand Palais as well as the Gallery on Rue Faubourg St. Honoré. (now Sotheby's, Paris). In 1954, Francis Carco had already written, “The ardor, the force contained in this young Greek painter signals a rare temperament…” And Galanis writes, “I viewed the paintings of Mr. Nonda which show a true talent and express a grand pictorial temperament…” This praise from two of the most respected artistic figures in Paris at the time resulted in his first one-man show in Paris in 1956 at the Gallerie Allard in the Rue des Capucines. J.P. Crespelle, reviewing the show in the France-Soir paper comments, “(Nonda) has shown himself to be among the most interesting young artists to emerge in recent years…this son of an Athenian tailor has been revealed as one of the hopes for new painting…”

== Africa ==
In the late 1950s Nonda created a large series of works (paintings and sculptures) that were clearly inspired by African art. These paintings, generally depicting animal and human forms, were painted on black backgrounds using blood and/or oil paints, as well as sand and other mixed media. The forms are primarily female nudes, bulls and lions or some metamorphic combination of those three. There was also a series of wooden sculptures with tribal connotations, one of which is clearly reminiscent of a Maasai warrior. It may have been an acquaintance with Princess Desta of Ethiopia, which turned his eye and thoughts to African art, but whatever the reason, it made its mark on Nonda's artistic trajectory.

== 1960s Public art on a large scale ==
Increasingly frustrated by constraints of limited gallery space and complaints that large works don't sell, he decided to move his work outdoors and work on a huge scale. In 1960, with the personal support of the French minister of culture, Andre Malraux, Nonda organized a one-man exhibition under the arch of the Pont Neuf (the oldest bridge in Paris). This was a revival of a forgotten tradition in which leading French painters such as Boucher and Chardin had exhibited their own work “en plein aire” in the 18th century at the nearby Place Dauphine. Nonda's Pont Neuf exhibitions occurred four years in a row, with a different theme each year. The two most famous were the 1960 exhibition devoted to the 15th-century poet François Villon and the 1963 exhibition known for the massive wooden sculpture of a “Trojan Horse” which Nonda lived inside for the duration of the show.

The Villon exhibition was dedicated to the life and work of François Villon, the 15th-century French poet. Forty-six years ago, this huge canvas of Villon's feast hung as the centerpiece of the show. It depicts the great “vagabond poet” with his voluptuous concubines. Nonda was drawn to this mysterious figure, the great French medieval poet who somehow combined a life of promiscuity, murder and debauchery with some of the finest poetry in the French language. For three centuries, lyric poetry drew its inspiration from the strict ideals of courtly love. Villon's poetry, in contrast, spoke of a world without order or reason. His vision is humoristic, a parody which reverses the morals and values he believed had paralyzed literature. His poetry wished to free readers into a fantasy borne of laughter. Villon expresses great sympathy for the courtesans of the time and this sympathy is extended to all victims of society in his poetry. Poetry for Villon ceases to be about nobles and their virtues and instead is a response to an unjust world. For these reasons, Villon has been hailed as “the first modern poet” and was celebrated by Nonda repeatedly in his oeuvre.

The exhibitions functioned as installations combining large painting, sculpture, objects and furniture which were open to the public day and night. This avant-garde concept created a sensation in Paris and in the art press worldwide.

In 1963, he built The Trojan Horse. Under the massive stone arches of the oldest bridge in Paris, the Horse towered above an entire microcosm. The paintings surrounded the viewers on both walls which were also hung with giant painted platters and carved vases. Life-sized human sculptures and busts of plaster or wood stared out toward the river. All of this created an otherworldly atmosphere, an atmosphere in which the art was no longer something untouchable and distant but a space the viewers inhabited. He lived inside the horse for the duration of the show, and guests were able to sit with him in the medieval chairs at the hand carved tables and drink from the goblets he had cast in bronze. The exhibition was in some respects unofficially “interactive”. The Pont Neuf Exhibits were given official sponsorship by the Commitie des Fetes de Paris as annual artistic events supported by the city of Paris. In the last paragraph of Crespelle's landmark book, (“Montmartre Vivant”) which charts the major artistic figures of Paris’ Montmartre district, he writes, “Nonda, the volcanic Greek painter (Greque volcanique), continues to hold true to the traditions of free and revolutionary painting at the summit of the old hill.”

== New York acrylics ==
In 1968, Nonda began to experiment with colourful acrylics on large canvasses after a six-month stay in New York City during which he discovered the qualities of acrylic paints for the first time. He conducted an entire series of these vivid canvasses which explore abstracted or stylized human form with new emphasis on colour. The forms mainly depict two lovers, seaside temples, and boats, which were inspired by his young American fiancée, Maria-Alexis Deviney, on a summer trip to Greece together. The trumpets which appear in certain canvasses are a symbol that reoccurs in all phases of his career as an expression of joyousness and elan vital. Works from this period are imbued with bold colours and broad, free brushstrokes. They anticipate the forms in a series of large sculptures he would later create from the hull of a wrecked wooden fishing trawler found in the Greek port of Lavrion. These zoomorphic and anthropomorphic compositions are often linked to the "embrace" or union between two figures.

== 1970s Color and the abstraction of form ==
In the 1970s Nonda's forms evolved into abstraction and exploded into color. During this period he produced vibrant, modernist works on canvas and a series of wooden sculptures made from the hull of an abandoned fishing boat. The work is colorful but often dominated by a central, abstracted human form in brown or black which links it to his earlier and later work. A striking series made with the blood of spleen bought at the meat markets of Paris was produced in a painterly, free and gestural style. This series is a powerful simplification of all his styles combined. The repeating image of a figure with arms held high denotes a sense of joyousness or élan vital, just as the broad semi-circle linking two forms is often an abstracted “embrace”. The theme of the female form remains a constant and the paintings are often sculptural and relate to the shapes found in later sculptures.

== Spleen – The sanguine series ==
From the 1950s onward, Nonda's use of ox blood was to be a major component in both large and small scale canvasses. He actually painted numerous early large scale works on his hands and knees in the all night meat and fish markets of Les Halles in Paris. Nonda used blood, charcoal and oil for smaller works on paper in the 1950s when materials were scarce, and explored the medium further in large compositions such as Par la Fin in the 1960s. In the 1970s he completed his striking "Spleen" or Sanguine Series which were the culmination of his experiments with this medium. While Nonda never painted the series with Baudelaire in mind specifically, there is certainly an interesting link between the dark tones of both poet and painter. As he explained, the dark hues of the blood, as well as the roughness, suited his temperament. In 1959, Jean-Paul Crespelle writes in a feature story for the France-Soir newspaper, "Just as Picasso had his rose period and his blue period, so Nonda will be remembered for his period of spleen".

== 1980s Painting and monumental sculpture ==
In 1981, feeling the need to continue work on the monumental sculptures, he moved with his family to his childhood home in the suburbs of Athens where he found the quiet and the space necessary for this heavy work. For the next ten years he would devote himself to the strenuous task of bending steel, mixing cement, creating molds of plaster and wire, alone, without assistance, often working all night with the help of powerful spotlights. This was arduous and thankless work, each piece requiring enormous physical and psychological effort from a man who was already in his mid sixties. One spring he grew dizzy and fell from his own scaffolding while working on the concrete molds. It was the first in a series of heart attacks which marked the beginning of a serious decline in health. The sculptures, massive and monolithic, weighing three to four tons each, were abstracted human and animal forms. Because of their marble-textured surface, no one guessed that they were constructed of cement. With hues of ochre, grey and obsidian and others verging on creamy white and yellow-rose, they looked more like giant formations of unusual stone. When asked why he had chosen such an atypical material he replied, “’Attractive’ materials bother me. We can't always work in marble. Glass in its cleanliness, its playfulness and glimmerings, its rainbows, doesn't suit me.”

While he worked on his sculptures he was also painting a series of very abstract acrylics on a type of rice paper which marked a return to sculptural forms in his painting as well as the use of text which linked abstract thought and female form in a poetic mélange of eroticism and fantasy. Constantly experimenting with new materials, he used wax, sand, egg, powders, plaster, stone and even coffee to achieve the desired effects. He was beginning to investigate fiberglass and new polyurethanes when his health prevented him from exploring them further. By this time he had distanced himself entirely from the art world. Always nostalgic for Paris, Nonda used French text in many of his paintings in the 1980s and consistently told his wife he wanted to return permanently to Paris once the sculptures were finished. The sculptures were eventually exhibited at Dexameni Square in the Kolonaki district in Athens. At the close of the exhibit, because of delays in transportation, an order given by the then mayor of Athens, had the sculptures removed with cranes and large trucks to “a city storage facility.” Nonda, recuperating from heart surgery at the time, as well as neurological damage, was unable to respond quickly. All but two of the massive sculptures disappeared en route. A long and mishandled court case concerning the disappearance of the sculptures ensued with no results. The only two pieces actually recovered were found by the artist himself in a municipal storage depot. What really happened to these sculptures and where they were sent remains a mystery as well as a national disgrace to this day.

== 1990s The final works ==
In the early 1990s Nonda made an initial return to darker colors. A large grey canvas entitled “The Monsters” was begun in Paris and reworked for some years. “I am battling with monsters” said Nonda and in some ways this struggle is reflected in these ominous and troubled forms. Haunted by depression and the first signs of his long struggle with Alzheimer's, his work process slowed considerably and he was disturbed by unsettling visions. Oddly, in a sudden rejection of this Manichean outlook, his last paintings were a bright series of fish on blue backgrounds. He was very excited by this return to his figurative origins and made numerous trips to the fish market in Athens to buy “models”. In the 1950s he had painted many fish, sometimes “on-site” in the fish market in Les Halles and it is a theme that remained as constant as the female figure in his life's oeuvre.

The unfortunate exhibition in Kolonaki was to be the last he would himself oversee. In 2003, on the occasion of the artist's 80th year, his family, with the support of the City of Athens and the French Embassy, organized a partial retrospective of his paintings from the period of 1955–1975. Many large scale works, as well as the giant canvas, Hommage a Villon, were sent from Paris and seen for the first time in Greece. At the time of the exhibit in 2003, Nonda was too ill to attend. The success of the exhibition was such, that in 2004, the city transported the same exhibition to the ancient fortress of Amochostou in Lefkosia, Cyprus, as the symbolic opening of a series of events planned to celebrate Cyprus’ entrance into the European Union. Nonda died at 83 in October 2005 at his home in Athens.

Fifty-three years after his first exhibition in Athens, the 2006 retrospective held at the New Benaki Museum marked the first large-scale retrospective of his work in Greece, as well as a symbolic return to the city of his birth. Hailed as one of Paris’ most vibrant artists in the fifties and sixties, his career spans a sixty-year arc across the latter half of the 20th century
