= Shaw-shaw-way-nay-beece =

Ojibwe chief

Shawshawwawnabeece (Zhaashaawanibiisi ("The Swallow") in Fiero spelling of Ojibwe) was a Michigan Native American chief of the Saginaw Swan Creek and Black River Band of Ojibwa (Chippewa).

He signed the Treaty of 1855 for his people which gave six adjoining townships of land in near Mount Pleasant in Isabella County, Michigan, to his people. His tribe still lives on this land.

He is buried in Isabella County in the Mission Creek Cemetery, also known as the Indian Cemetery. The cemetery was set up by the Methodist Episcopal (Indian) Church. A Michigan state historical marker stands at the site.
