= Lawoughqua =

Lawoughqua /ləˈwɒfkwɑː, -ˈwɒx-/ (fl. 1765) was a Shawnee civil chief who served as speaker for the Shawnees at a council at Fort Pitt in 1765.

The council was called by British Indian agent George Croghan, who was sent by his superior, Sir William Johnson, to negotiate with natives of the Ohio country as Pontiac's Rebellion was ending. The previous year, during the Bouquet expedition, the Shawnees had agreed to end hostilities and return prisoners to the British. Croghan's goal at the Fort Pitt council was to see that the Shawnees had complied with these terms before reopening trade with the Ohio Indians.

Lawoughqua gave a speech before handing over the captives. Significantly, he agreed to address the British as "father" instead of "brother". Previously, the Shawnees had addressed the French king as "father" in diplomatic speeches; the transfer of this fictive kinship term of address to the British signified that the British were the dominant European power after victories in the French and Indian War and Pontiac's uprising.
