= Illinois Territory in the War of 1812 =

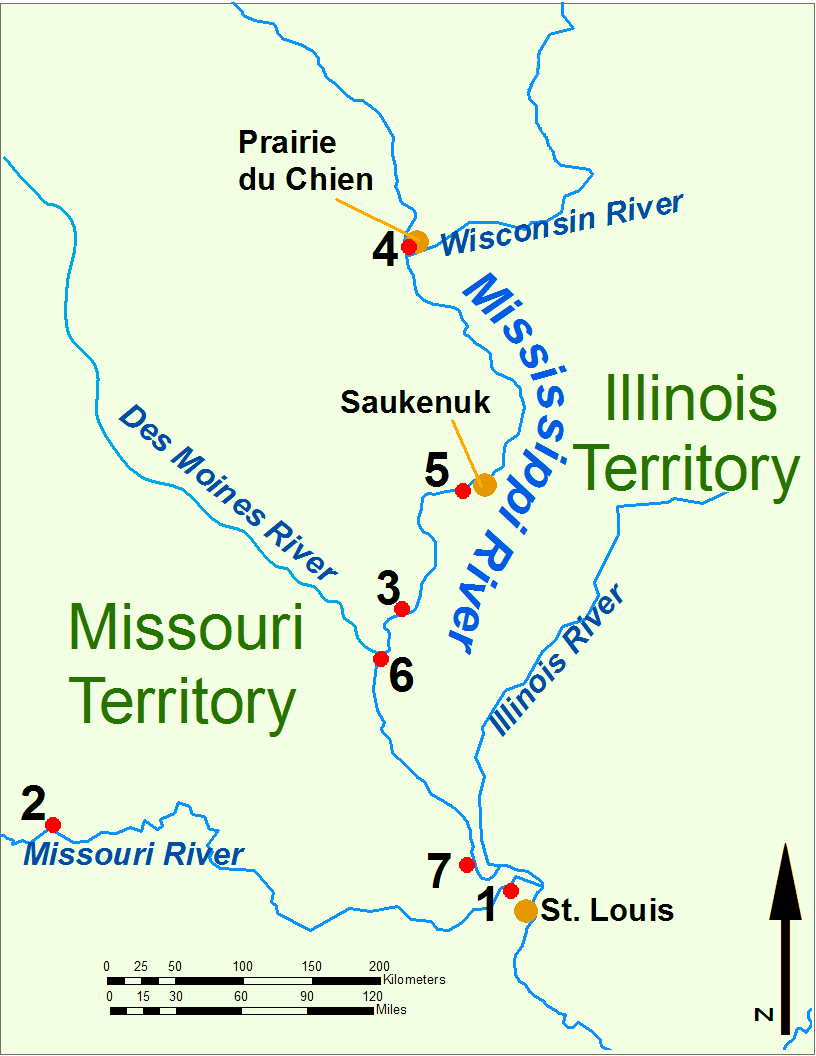
Operations on the Upper Mississippi River during the War of 1812. 1: Fort Bellefontaine U.S. headquarters; 2: Fort Osage, abandoned 1813; 3: Fort Madison, defeated 1813; 4: Fort Shelby, defeated 1814; 5: Battle of Rock Island Rapids, July 1814 and the Battle of Credit Island, Sept. 1814; 6: Fort Johnson, abandoned 1814; 7: Fort Cap au Gris and the Battle of the Sink Hole, May 1815.

During the War of 1812, the Illinois Territory was the scene of fighting between Native Americans and United States soldiers and settlers. The Illinois Territory at that time included the areas of modern Illinois, Wisconsin and parts of Minnesota and Michigan.

== Background ==
Tensions in the Illinois Territory between U.S. settlers and Native Americans were on the rise in the years before the War of 1812. At Peoria, Potawatomi chief Main Poc was a supporter of the resistance movement of Shawnee prophet Tenskwatawa and his brother Tecumseh. Raids against American settlers in Illinois increased after the Shawnee brothers' loss at the Battle of Tippecanoe in the Indiana Territory in 1811.

== War of 1812 ==
There were few U.S. Army soldiers this far west on the frontier. Ninian Edwards, the territorial governor, directed state militia operations. The low point for the Americans came in August 1812, when a large Indian force, primarily Potawatomis, attacked soldiers and civilians as they evacuated Fort Dearborn in Chicago.

In October 1812, the Americans launched an expedition against the Native villages in the Peoria area. Led by Governor Edwards and Colonel William Russell, they attacked and destroyed Potawatomi and Kickapoo villages, prompting the Natives to abandon the area. Raids continued, however.

In September 1813, the Americans built Fort Clark in Peoria. In June 1814, William Clark built Fort Shelby at Prairie du Chien. The British captured the fort in July and renamed it Fort McKay. Two American attempts to send more troops to Prairie du Chien were turned back by Indian attacks at Rock Island Rapids and Credit Island, the final actions of the War of 1812 in the region. Hostilities between the U.S. and area Native Americans would resume in the Winnebago War of 1827 and the Black Hawk War of 1832.

5 million acres of land in the Illinois Territory, between the Illinois and Mississippi Rivers below Rock Island, was set aside as the Military Tract of 1812 to pay soldiers in land grants for their service. This is over 1/8 of the area of the modern state and included Indian-occupied areas, some of whose displaced inhabitants would later join Blackhawk.

The state of Illinois has a list of 1,500 names of militiamen and officers from original muster rolls although the muster lists are known to be incomplete.

== Battles ==
- Battle of Fort Dearborn
- Battle of Africa Point
- Battle of Rock Island Rapids

== See also ==
- Black Partridge
- Chief Comas
- Chief Gomo
- Senachwine
- Samuel Hopkins
- William McKay
