= Senachwine =

- Born: c. 1744 near the Illinois River
- Died: 1831 near Putnam County, Illinois, United States
- Other name: Petchaho
- Known for: Potawatomi chieftain and ally of Black Partridge during the Peoria War.
- Title: Chieftain of the Illinois River Potawatomi
- Term: 1815-1831
- Predecessor: Gomo
- Successor: Kaltoo
- Children: Kaltoo, son
- Relatives: Gomo, brother

Senachwine (Potawatomi: Znajjewan, "Difficult Current") or Petchaho (supposedly from Potawatomi: "Red Cedar") (c. 1744–1831) was a 19th-century Illinois River Potawatomi chieftain. In 1815, he succeeded his brother Gomo as chieftain of their band and was one of the last major Potawatomi chieftains to live in the region.

A number of places in Illinois are named in his honor including Senachwine Township in Putnam County, Illinois, Senachwine Creek, Senachwine Lake and the Lake Senachwine Reservoir.

== Biography ==
In April 1812, he and other Potawatomi chieftains met with Governor Ninian Edwards at Cahokia to discuss relations between the Potawatomi and the United States. Although opposed to an offensive war, Senachwine sided with Black Partridge during the Peoria War and commanded a sizable force during the conflict. He later accompanied the Potawatomi peace delegation who were escorted by Colonel George Davenport to St. Louis where a peace treaty was eventually signed.

Around 1814, a mysterious Baptist preacher and missionary known as Wigby lived in his village. Wigby was allowed to baptize him and later converted Senachwine to Christianity. However, despite Wigby's attempts to dissuade him, Senachwine refused to give up polygamy and retained his several wives. After Wigby's death, he was buried on a high bluff overlooking Senachwine's village.

He succeeded his brother Gomo as head chieftain of the Illinois River band and was a signatory of several treaties between the Potawatomi and the United States during the 1810s and 1820s. He and Black Partridge would remain the leading chieftains of the Potawatomi for over a decade before their positions of authority and influence were assumed by Shabbona. A year before his death, Senachwine believed that the Potawatomi nation, and eventually all Native Americans, would eventually become extinct. His son, Kaltoo (or Young Senachwine), succeeded him as chieftain after his death in the summer of 1831. He was buried on a high bluff overlooking the village, like the missionary Wigby years before, and a wooden monument was placed on his grave. A black flag was also flown from a high pole placed next to the monument and could be seen from the gravesite for several years afterwards. Two years later, his band were removed to the Indian Territory and eventually settled in western Kansas.

In the summer of 1835, 23 Potawatomi warriors traveled over 500 miles to visit the gravesite of Senachwine. Their faces blackened and their heads wrapped in blankets, they performed a ritual invoking the Great Spirit to protect the gravesite and remains of the chieftain. According to a local resident observing the ceremony, the warriors spent several hours knelt around the gravesite as "their wails and lamentations were heard far away". The following morning they performed the "dance of the dead" which continued for several days before departing. A short time after, Senachwine's grave was robbed of its valuables including his tomahawk, rifle, several medals and other personal effects. The chieftains bones had also been scattered around the site. Members of his band returned to the site to rebury his remains and again placed a wooden monument over his grave. James R. Taliaferro, who had been present at the reburial, later built a cabin near the gravesite and claimed that "Indians from the west at different times made a pilgrimage to the grave".

The Sons of the American Revolution chapter in Peoria, Illinois placed a bronze memorial plaque, engraved with his speech to Black Hawk pleading for peace prior to the Black Hawk War, at the supposed burial spot of Senachwine north of present-day Putnam County, Illinois on June 13, 1937. During the ceremony, an address was given by author P.G. Rennick. Five tribal members of the Potawatomi from Kansas were also in attendance during the ceremony.

== See also ==
- Polygamy in North America
