= Black Partridge (chief) =

Peoria Lake Potawatomi chieftain

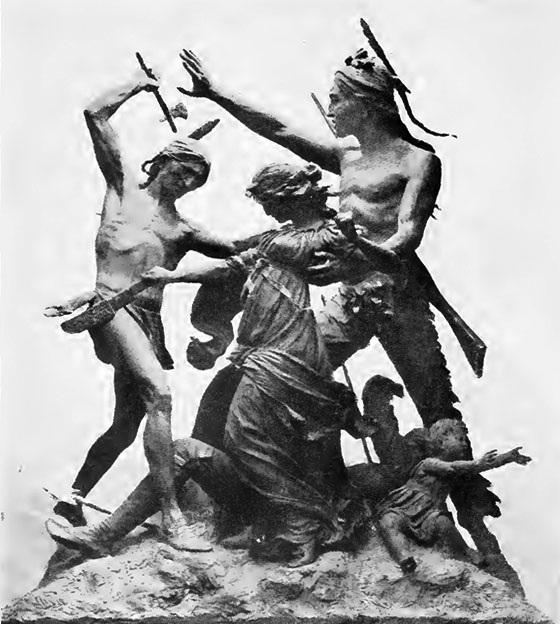
- Sculpture from the Fort Dearborn Massacre Monument by Carl Rohl-Smith (1893). The sculpture portrays the rescue of Margaret Helm (center) by Potawatomi chief Black Partridge (right).
- Born: Makade-bakii c. 1744; Peoria Lake, Illinois
- Other names: Black Pheasant, Mucketeypokee, Mucktypoke, Mka-da-puk-ke, Muccutay Penay, Makadebakii, Mkadébki, Assikinack
- Occupation: Potawatomi chieftain
- Known for: Potawatomi chieftain during the Peoria War; rescued victims of the Fort Dearborn Massacre with his brother Waubonsie.
- Parent(s): Wabb-shkum and Mah-jues
- Relatives: Waubonsie, brother

Black Partridge or Black Pheasant (Potawatomi: Mucketeypokee, Mucktypoke, Mka-da-puk-ke, Muccutay Penay, Makadebakii, Mkadébki) (fl. 1795–1816) was a 19th-century Peoria Lake Potawatomi chieftain. Although a participant in the Northwest Indian War and the War of 1812, he was a friend to early American settlers and an advocate for peaceful relations with the United States. He and his brother Waubonsie both attempted to protect settlers during the Battle of Fort Dearborn after they were unsuccessful in preventing the attack.

A memorial at the site of the massacre in present-day Chicago, Illinois once included a statue of Black Partridge preventing a tomahawk from hitting Margaret Helm, the wife of one of the defenders at Fort Dearborn. Black Partridge Woods, a state park in Cook County, Illinois, as well as Partridge Township in Woodford County, Illinois are also named in his honor.

== Biography ==
Black Partridge is first recorded during the Northwest Indian War as a war chief under Matchekewis at the Battle of Fallen Timbers. He was later awarded a silver medal, with an engraving of President George Washington, from General "Mad" Anthony Wayne at the signing of the Treaty of Greenville on August 3, 1795; another account claims the medal was presented to him by General William Henry Harrison at the Treaty of Fort Wayne on September 30, 1809, and had the engraving of President James Madison. He wore the medal for several years afterwards to symbolize the Potawatomi's friendship with American settlers. One of the Potawatomi chieftains wishing to remain neutral during Tecumseh's War, he and Gomo refused to ally with Shawnee chieftain Tecumseh when approached by him during the summer of 1810. Black Partridge said to Tecumseh,

I cannot join you. This token was given to me at Greenville by the great chief [Wayne]. On it you see the face of our father at Washington. As long as this hangs on my neck I can never raise my tomahawk against the whites.

Although he advocated peace, he could not prevent the younger tribal members and warriors from joining Tecumseh's fight. He unsuccessfully tried to dissuade the Potawatomi from joining the attack at Fort Dearborn and, on the evening of August 14, 1812, he rode ahead of the main force arriving at Dearborn to return the medal to the fort commandant, Captain Nathan Heald.

Father, I come to deliver up to you the medal I wear. It was given to me by the Americans, and I have long worn it in token of our mutual friendship. Our young men are resolved to imbue their hands in the blood of the whites. I cannot restrain them, and I will not wear a token of peace while I am compelled to act as an enemy.

During the ensuing Battle of Fort Dearborn, he and his brother Waubonsie tried to protect the settlers from the violence being carried out by the attackers. Black Partridge saved the life of a Mrs. Margaret Helm, the wife of Lieutenant Lenai T. Helm and stepdaughter of Indian trader John Kinzie, by holding her underwater under the appearance of drowning her in Lake Michigan. He later removed her to a nearby Indian camp where her wounds were dressed. Black Partridge also helped free her husband who was being held captive by the Red Head Chief at Kankakee. Delivering the ransom on behalf of U.S. Indian Agent Thomas Forsyth, he voluntarily offered his pony, rifle and a gold ring along with the original written order for $100 signed by General George Rogers Clark.

Returning to his village on Peoria Lake however, he found his village had been burned by the Illinois Rangers from Edwardsville under orders from Governor Ninian Edwards. Among those massacred at the village were his daughter and grandchild. Taking 200 warriors from nearby villages, as well as 100 from Shequenebec and another 100 from Mittitass, he joined in the attack against Fort Clark on September 19, 1813, although this attack was repulsed by the fort's defenders. Black Hawk, then a young warrior, was also present at the attack. Black Partridge and his band eventually surrendered after being driven back to Fort Clark by General Henry Dodge and Major Zachary Taylor. He was one of the 13 chieftains escorted by Colonel George Davenport to St. Louis where peace was signed between the Potawatomi and the United States. He was a later signatory of several treaties between the Potawatomi and the United States government.

== In popular culture ==
He is portrayed in several historical and dime novels including:

- Myrtle Reed's The Shadow of Victory: A Romance of Fort Dearborn (1903)
- Randall Parrish's When Wilderness was King: A Tale of the Illinois Country (1904)
- H.R. Gordon's Black Partridge, or the Fall of Fort Dearborn (1906)
- Julia Cooley Altrocchi's Wolves Against the Moon (1957)
- Jerry Crimmins's Fort Dearborn: A Novel (2006)
