= Crow (Sioux leader) =

Lakota chief

Crow was a Lakota chief who gave the opening battle cry at the Battle of the Little Big Horn.
