= Charles Beaubien =

French Canadian trader and British intelligence agent (1748–1794)

Charles Beaubien (8 August 1748 at Fort Detroit – 4 July 1794 at Fort Wayne) was a French Canadian trader in the 18th century who became British Agent to the Miami Nation.

== Biography ==
Charles Jean Baptiste Cuillerier dit Beaubien was the son of Jean Baptiste Cuillerier dit Beaubien and Marie Anne Lootman dit Barrois. Beaubien was born in Fort Detroit, Pays d'en Haut, now Detroit, Michigan.

He married Tacumwah, the mother of Chief Jean Baptiste de Richardville, after a bitter divorce in 1774 from her husband, Antoine Joseph Drouet de la Richerville, a trade rival. The cause of the divorce was control of a profitable 8-mile portage between the Maumee and Wabash Rivers that connected the Great Lakes and Canada to the Mississippi River. The portage belonged to Tacumwah's family, but had recently been taken over by the brothers Alexander and Francis Maisonville, whom Richerville supported. When the arguments turned to physical abuse, Tacumwah moved in with Beaubien, and he sided with her family in the court proceedings at Fort Detroit. Tacumwah not only retained all her property from the divorce, but British oversight of the portage was taken from the Maisonville brothers and given to Beaubien. Charles Beaubien and Tacumwah had one daughter, Josetta Beaubien Roubidoux, but her descendants were struck from the tribal roll in 1867.

Beaubien was appointed British Agent to the Miami tribe of Native Americans, and he seems to have been loyal both to the Miami and to the British. He accompanied or led raids against settlements on the Ohio and Wabash rivers, and he supplied weapons to Native American allies. In one case, the Miami refused to go on a raid to Kentucky, so Beaubien recruited Shawnee under Chief Blackfish, who then captured Daniel Boone in the Siege of Boonesborough in 1778.

Beaubien preceded Lt-Governor Henry Hamilton as a scout for the British trek to recapture Vincennes in 1778. Nevertheless, there is some evidence that Beaubien, while on a trip to Kaskaskia with the Wea, warned George Rogers Clark of an Ottawa plot to kill him. Clark, after his capture of Vincennes, told Hamilton that Beaubien had provided the Americans with information against the British.

Whatever his role with Clark, Beaubien retained his British office and was disliked by the Canadien residents and the new American settlers. When La Balme came to the area in 1780 with a plot to take Fort Detroit, he promised to arrest Beaubien and take him to Fort Pitt for trial. When La Balme arrived in Kekionga, however, Beaubien and his family were not there, so the band of Canadien residents raided his storehouses for 12 days, long enough for Little Turtle to mount a defense that killed nearly every man and restored all stolen goods to Beaubien.

Arent De Peyster, commander at Fort Detroit, concluded that the Miami fought La Balme's band of Canadien residents not because of their loyalty to the British, but because of their loyalty to Beaubien. The British thereafter trusted Beaubien, and when all other traders were ordered to Fort Detroit, he was allowed to stay at Kekionga, reinforced with British rangers.

Little is known about Beaubien after the American Revolution. He was not among the Miami when they were forced to surrender to Anthony Wayne in 1795. Beaubien is believed to have died near Kekionga, Northwest Territory, later known as Fort Wayne, Indiana.

== Sources ==
- Anson, Bert. The Miami Indians. ©2000. University of Oklahoma Press. ISBN 0-8061-3197-7.
- Birzer, Bradley J. (July 2000). "French Imperial remnants on the middle ground: The strange case of August de la Balme and Charles Beaubien". Journal of the Illinois State Historical Society. Archived from the original on February 20, 2009 – via FindArticles.
- Carter, Harvey Lewis. The Life and Times of Little Turtle: First Sagamore of the Wabash. ©1987, Urbana: University of Illinois Press. ISBN 0-252-01318-2.
- Magnin, Frédéric. Mottin de la Balme, cavalier des deux mondes et de la liberté. Paris: L'Harmattan, 2005. ISBN 2-7475-9080-1.
