= Le Gris =

- Nagohquangogh

Pepikokia band of the Miami tribe leader

Nagohquangogh (Le Gris), was a chief of the Pepikokia band of the Miami tribe in the 18th century. Also known as The Gray, he was one of three important Miami leaders during the Northwest Indian War, along with Pacanne and Little Turtle.

In 1752, a smallpox epidemic hit many Miami villages. Charles le Moyne, Sieur de Longueil wrote of it to the minister of colonial affairs in France, and noted that Chief Coldfoot and his sons were dead, as was "Le Gris, Chief of the Tepicons," who was "well disposed towards the French." The Le Gris he wrote of was probably an elder relative of the subject of this article, who was born Waspikingua, became Nagohquangogh, and is sometimes referred to as Le Petit Gris to distinguish himself from the former chief.

During the Winter of 1824–25, Miami Chief Le Gros shared some Miami history with C. C. Trowbridge. He referred to an "old woman and her son" who survived a smallpox epidemic on the Tippecanoe River and came to the Miami. According to his story, the son was Le Gris.

Other survivors of the epidemic founded a Pepikokia village on the east side of the St. Joseph River, not far from Kekionga. By 1764, Le Gris was the recognized leader of the village. The emigration caused a split in the Pepikokia band; Le Gris often working and siding with Kekionga, while the principal village of Kithtippecanuck on the Tippecanoe River sided with Ouiatenon. Nagohquangogh signed the Greenville treaty in 1795, along with Michikinikwa, Peshewa and others.

More information about Le Gris comes from the diary of Henry Hay, an English-Canadian trader from Detroit who spent three months with the Miami. During his stay, Pacanne was away on business, leaving decisions to be made by Tacumwah and Le Gris. Hay got along well with Le Gris, and his journal details some personality differences between him and Little Turtle. Although Little Turtle had some say in most of the decisions, he was much more reserved and always sober. Le Gris, by contrast, was talkative, sociable, and prone to drunkenness.

Le Gris' Village, along with Kekionga, remained loyal to the British during and after the American Revolution. Le Gris and Pacanne accompanied British Lt-Governor Henry Hamilton on his journey down the Wabash River to capture Vincennes, although when George Rogers Clark came in February 1779, Le Gris waited outside the town to await the outcome of the battle. Many raids were based from the villages of Le Gris and Pacanne. Consequently, they were the target of American expeditions, leading to Hardin's Defeat, and St. Clair's Defeat.

The Americans finally gained a victory in 1794 when General Anthony Wayne led his Legion of the United States at the Battle of Fallen Timbers. The next year, several Indian nations were represented at a peace conference which drew up the Treaty of Greenville. Le Gris was reluctant to attend, but was persuaded, and drew his mark on the treaty as "Nagohquangogh, or Le Gris".

The town of Lagro, Indiana in Lagro Township is named for Le Gris.
