= James Fontaine =

James Fontaine or James Fountaine (c. 1757–1790) was an officer who served in American Revolutionary War and the Northwest Indian War.

James Fontaine is believed to have been born in Hanover County, Virginia in about 1757. At an early age he entered on a military career, becoming a member of the first expert rifle company raised in Buckingham District, Virginia, for the defense of the colony in 1775. Later this company was attached to the 2nd Virginia Regiment, October 21, 1775. He served until March 1776, near Williamsburg, Virginia.

Fontaine moved to Kentucky, where he served as major in the Northwest Indian War. In 1790 he served under General Josiah Harmar in a march northward from Cincinnati against the Miami, under the leadership of Little Turtle.

Fountaine was killed on October 22, 1790, at a battle variously known as Harmar's Defeat, Battle of the Maumee, Battle of Kekionga, or Battle of the Miami Towns. This occurred near the confluence of the St. Joseph River and St. Marys River forming the Maumee River, near modern Fort Wayne, Indiana. The Miami called it the "Battle of the Pumpkin Fields", because, after the battle, the scalped heads of the Americans reminded them of a pumpkin field.

Fountain County, Indiana was named in his honor.
