= Cold Foot (Miami) =

Miami chief

Miami leader

Personal details
- Cause of death: Smallpox
- Relations: P'koum-kwa (nephew); Tacumwah (niece)

Cold Foot was a Miami chief in the 18th century; his brother or brother-in-law was The Turtle (Aquenackqua), father of Cold Foot's nephew, P'koum-kwa and of P'koum-kwa's sister, Tacumwah, who became the wife of a French fur trader (Joseph Drouet de Richerville) and the mother of Chief Peshewa. Their family owned and controlled the Long Portage, an 8-mile strip of land between the Maumee and Wabash Rivers used by traders travelling between Canada and Louisiana. An inhabitant of Kekionga, Cold Foot lived during a time when the Miami were torn between their traditional trading partners of New France and new, more lucrative traders from the British colonies. There is a record of Cold Foot receiving a large reward for putting down some hostilities during this time.

When many of the Miami favored the British and abandoned Kekionga for Pickawillany, Cold Foot remained loyal to his French allies and remained at Kekionga. The French rebuilt the nearby fort on higher ground in 1750, and Cold Foot moved to the old fort, which became known as Cold Foot Village. During the Winter of 1751/1752, however, the village was hit with smallpox, and many of the inhabitants died, including Cold Foot and his son. Future chief Pacanne may have been his nephew.
