= Kekionga =

Indigenous North American settlement

Coordinates: 41°5′19″N 85°7′26″W

Kekionga (Miami-Illinois: kiihkayonki), (Note: According to J. Dunn, Jr., the name "usually said to mean "blackberry patch," or "blackberry bush," this plant being considered an emblem of antiquity because it sprang up on the sites of old villages. This theory rests on the testimony of Barron, a longtime an old French trader on the Wabash. It is more probable that Kekioqa is a corruption or dialect form of Kiskakon, or Kikakon, which was the original name of the place." J. P. Dunn, INDIANA: A REDEMPTION FROM SLAVERY New York: HOUGHTON, MIFFLIN AND COMPANY, 1888, 48, Note 1.) (Note: Michael McCafferty, an Algonquian and Uto-Aztecan linguist professor at Indiana University, exhaustively examined the etymology of 'Kekionga' and dismissed Dunn's explanation and several others. See the chapter "Trails to Kekionga" in the relevantly titled 'Native American Place Names of Indiana' (Urbana and Chicago: University of Illinois Press, 2008), esp. p. 76.) also known as Kiskakon or Pacan's Village, was the capital of the Miami people. It was located at the confluence of the Saint Joseph and Saint Marys rivers to form the Maumee River on the western edge of the Great Black Swamp in present-day Indiana. Over their respective decades of influence from colonial times to after the American Revolution, French and Indian Wars, and the Northwest Indian Wars, the French, British and Americans all established trading posts and forts at the large village, originally known as Fort Miami, due to its key location on the portage connecting Lake Erie to the Wabash and Mississippi rivers. The European-American town of Fort Wayne, Indiana, started as a settlement around the American Fort Wayne stockade after the War of 1812.

== History ==
Long occupied by successive cultures of indigenous peoples, Kekionga was a large village of the Miami people at the time of European encounter and was the largest village of its kind in what is now the state of Indiana. Its name refers to the abundance of blackberries in the region, as it was located in the most expansive brier patch in the state. Kekionga was naturally situated to be an important trading post for Europeans due to its location on the six-mile portage between the Maumee and Little rivers, which connected Lake Erie to the Wabash River and Mississippi River. Due to the mid-17th century French and Iroquois Wars over the fur trade, most traders believed the route was too dangerous. Following the wars, however, the portage proved to be the shortest route between the French colonies of New France (Canada) and La Louisiane. The area was full of wildlife as it had not been densely inhabited for years.

The Miami at first benefited from trade with the Europeans, who were primarily Canadiens from Quebec. Under Jean Baptiste Bissot, Sieur de Vincennes, the Canadiens established a trading post and fort, first at the St. Joseph River, and later at Kekionga. Vincennes and the Miami developed a strong and enduring friendship.

Kekionga remained a central site for the Miami for several decades; their other villages were more temporary. The large meeting house hosted official tribal councils. However, a smallpox epidemic struck Kekionga in 1733 and people evacuated the village for a year. In a speech at the Treaty of Greenville (1795), Little Turtle called Kekionga "that glorious gate ... through which all the good words of our chiefs had to pass from the north to the south, and from the east to the west."

Additionally, the village served as a gathering center for warrior natives of various tribes who engaged on the frontier. Approximately 26 war parties were known to have left the village throughout 1786.

=== Colonial period ===
British merchants, seeking to expand their economic base, convinced some Miami to travel East for trade, in violation of the 1713 Treaty of Utrecht. In 1749, the pro-British La Demoiselle left Kekionga to establish the English trading village of Pickawillany, which grew rapidly. Fighting between pro-French and pro-British villages broke out among the Miami in 1751, as tensions rose in the region. French officials tried to persuade the Miami to return to Kekionga, which was nearer their stronghold of Detroit and harder for the British to reach. Lieutenant Louis Coulon de Villiers was sent to the dilapidated Fort Miamis and given authority to commandeer French voyageurs to construct a new fort, which was finished in 1752. In the same year, the pro-French chief Cold Foot died at Kekionga in another smallpox epidemic. When the French-allied Three Fires Confederacy destroyed Pickawillany, most of the surviving Miami returned to Kekionga, which stopped assisting the French.

After the French and Indian War (1756–1763) ended with the French defeated, France ceded Canada to the British Empire. The Miami of Kekionga became involved in Pontiac's Rebellion in the spring of 1763, capturing the British garrison and killing the two ranking officers. The following year, Pacanne emerged as the village chief when he spared the life of the captive Captain Thomas Morris and returned him to Detroit. By 1765, Kekionga had accepted the British. Deputy commissioner George Croghan described Kekionga:

The Twightwee Village is situated on both Sides of a River called St. Joseph's ... The Indian Village Consists of about 40 or 50 Cabins besides nine or ten French Houses.

=== As part of the Northwest Territory ===
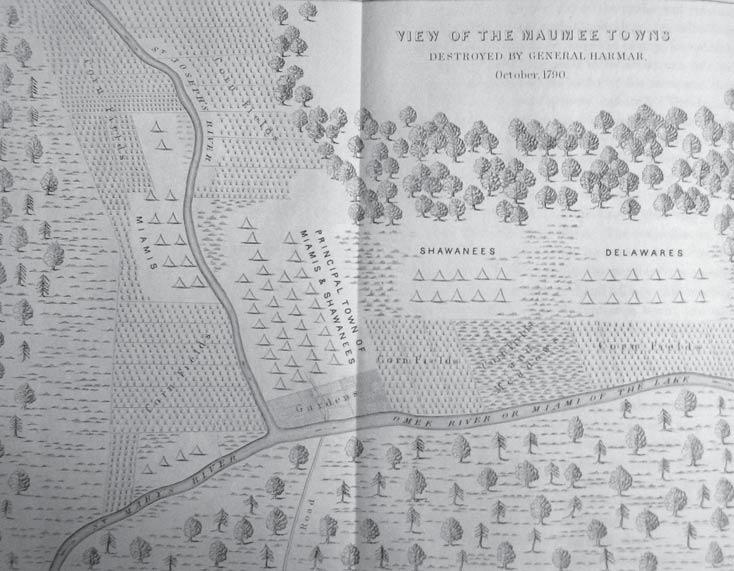
A map of Kekionga

In 1780 during the American Revolutionary War, Kekionga was sacked by a force of French colonials led by Colonel Augustin de La Balme, who planned to take Detroit from the British. A Miami force led by Chief Little Turtle destroyed the French force. The Miami and the European-American traders of Kekionga remained economically tied to the British-held Fort Detroit, even after the British ceded all claims of the Northwest Territory to the new United States following the war in the Treaty of Paris (1783).

In 1790, the Canadian Governor Guy Carleton warned the government in London that the loss of Kekionga would result in grave economic hardships to Detroit. He estimated that Kekionga annually produced 2000 packs of pelts, worth about £24,000 sterling. This was twice the value of the next most important trade area, between Detroit and Lake Huron.

During the winter of 1789/1790, the traders Henry Hay and John Kinzie stayed in Kekionga. Hay kept a daily journal, which recorded their regular routines of drinking, dancing, and parties, as well as weekly Mass. Hay played the flute and Kinzie played the fiddle, which made them popular with the inhabitants of Kekionga. Although Hay and Kinzie stayed primarily in the French-speaking village in Kekionga, they also described some of the Miami villages. They frequently talked with the chiefs Pacanne, Little Turtle, Blue Jacket, and Le Gris, as well as brothers James, George, and Simon Girty, who lived only three miles away.

The new President of the United States George Washington, as early as 1784, had told Henry Knox that a strong U.S. post should be established at Kekionga. The large Native American city was important to the British trade economy, and protected a strategic portage between the Great Lakes Basin and Mississippi watershed. Knox, however, was concerned that a U.S. fort at Kekionga would provoke the Indians and denied the request to build a fort there from Northwest Territory governor Arthur St. Clair. St. Clair, in 1790, had told both Washington and Knox that "we will never have peace with the Western Nations until we have a garrison there." Western native leaders, meanwhile, met at Kekionga to determine a response to the Treaty of Fort Harmar.

United States General Josiah Harmar was ordered to invade Kekionga. In 1790, his army counted seven distinct villages in the vicinity of Kekionga, known collectively as "the Miami Towns" or Miamitown, in spite of large villages of Shawnee and Delaware also located there. The collected villages of Kekionga had advance knowledge of the army, and most of the people evacuated the area, carrying as many of their food stores as possible. The traders took their trade goods to Fort Detroit, after giving out all their arms and ammunition to the Miami defenders. Major Ebenezer Denny, an officer with the US, drew a map of Kekionga in 1790, which showed a collection of eight distinct villages, surrounded by 500 acres of cornfields. Denny described the rivers with “several little towns on both branches, but the principal one is below the confluence on the north side. Several tolerable good log houses, said to have been occupied by British traders; a few pretty good gardens with some fruit trees and vast fields of corn in almost every direction.”

The United States army burned some villages and food stores, but was forced to retreat after suffering high casualties in a series of battles with forces led by Little Turtle.

The Miami victories over General Harmar's army encouraged anti-U.S. sentiment in Kekionga, and United States Secretary of War Henry Knox now decided that a United States fort needed to be built in the area. He ordered Governor St. Clair to attack Kekionga and maintain a presence in the area. That campaign was intercepted long before they reached their destination in what became the Native Americans' greatest victory over United States forces.

=== Decline ===
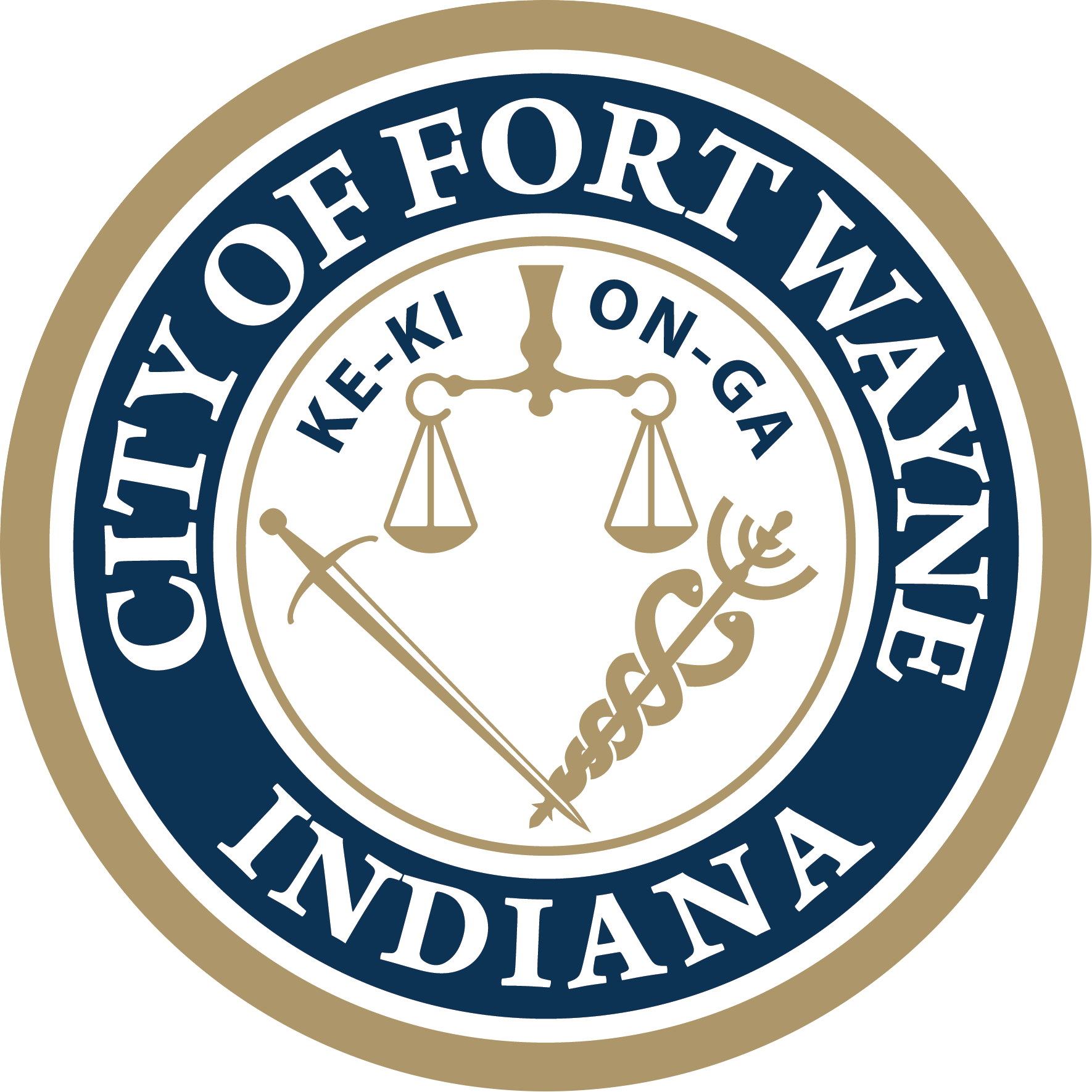
Seal of Fort Wayne

Following the 1790 attacks by Harmar, the Native American confederacy moved their center away from Kekionga, to the Auglaize River.

In 1794, the American General Anthony Wayne led his well-trained Legion of the United States toward Kekionga, but turned and marched toward the British-held Fort Miami near modern-day Toledo, Ohio. Following General Wayne's victory at the Battle of Fallen Timbers, Kekionga's prominence began to diminish among the Miami. The Legion arrived at Kekionga on 17 September 1794, and Wayne personally selected the site for the new U.S. fort, which was named for him. It was finished by 17 October, and was capable of withstanding 24-pound cannons. Despite their objections, the Miami lost control of the long portage by the Treaty of Greenville (1795), since the Northwest Ordinance passed by Congress guaranteed free use of important portages in the region. At that time, the Miami claimed the portage brought them $100 per day.

After the construction of Fort Wayne, Kekionga's importance to the Miami slowly declined. The Miami village at the Forks of the Wabash (modern Huntington, Indiana) became more prominent. Despite the strong U.S. presence and loss of portage revenue, however, the Miami maintained sovereignty in Kekionga through the War of 1812. Under the Treaty of Ghent in 1814, they were forced to cede this and other central Indiana land in punishment for their not having supported the United States in the war. The site was redeveloped as the city of Fort Wayne, Indiana, between 1819 and 1823.

The old name was used for one of the first professional baseball teams, the Fort Wayne Kekiongas. It also appears on Fort Wayne's city seal.

== See also ==
- Treaty of Greenville
- Treaty of Mississinewas
