= Thomas Morris (British Army officer) =

British Army officer and writer

Thomas Morris (1732?–1808) was a British Army officer and writer.

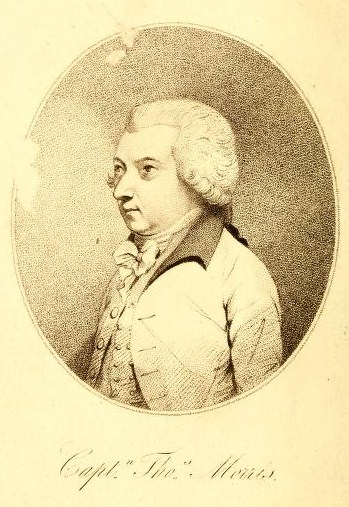
Thomas Morris

== Early life ==
Born at Carlisle, where he was baptised on 22 April 1732, he was one of four sons of Captain Thomas Morris, soldier author of the popular song Kitty Crowder, who died about 1752. Charles Morris the songwriter and poet was his brother.

Morris entered Winchester College as a scholar in 1741. After time in tuition in London, joined the 17th Foot, which was his father's regiment, at Kinsale, in 1748. In 1753 he took leave and spent time in Paris, giving him a command of the French language.

== American service ==
In 1757 Morris shipped with his regiment for the Americas. He was at Canajoharie in 1761, from where he wrote to his good friend Richard Montgomery.

Morris spent time in Martinique, the 17th Regiment having taken part in the Invasion of Martinique (1762) under Robert Monckton, and served at the siege of Havana (1762). He was then under Colonel John Bradstreet in North America. For Bradstreet, who was marching along the southern shore of Lake Erie from Niagara to re-establish British control in Indiana, he undertook a chancy mission in 1764, just after the end of the French and Indian War (the Seven Years' War in the North American theatre). When Morris was sent off on 26 August, without an escort of soldiers, Bradstreet had been misinformed by Delaware Indians and Shawnees about the attitude of Native Americans to the west.

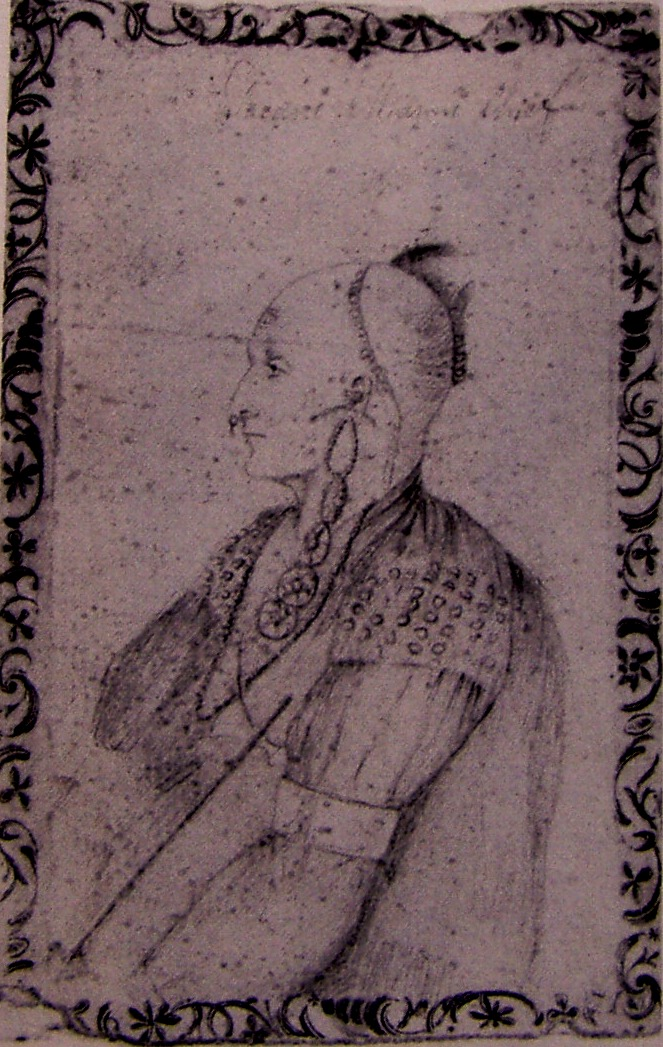
Miami chief Pacanne, who released Morris, sketch from 1778

Morris ascended the Maumee River, with the permission of the Miami Indians, carrying a message to the French at Fort de Chartres, and with a mission of pacification, directed to make peace with the Native American groups he met. He was supposed to summon these groups to a council at Detroit with the British. He was supposed also to cross the watershed with the Wabash River (at Kekionga, close to modern Fort Wayne), and make his way into Illinois down the Wabash.

In fact Morris first met Pontiac at a village of Ottawa Indians. Morris wrote in a confident tone to Thomas Mante, then brigade-major with Bradstreet, of the results to be expected from Pontiac's co-operative attitude. But these were to be negated by the reactions of others of the Six Nations of the Iroquois, at Detroit. Morris's own observation of the prevalent drapeau blanc in the village reflected the continuing influence of the idea that French power would return from its defeat. It was Bradstreet's diplomacy or lack of it at Detroit (see Pontiac's War), in Pontiac's absence, that would later be criticised by Thomas Gage.

Allowed to proceed, Morris was captured and held at Kekionga. Pacanne asserted authority there, over the counsel of two Kickapoo chiefs who warned Morris away from Fort Ouiatenon (near modern West Lafayette). Morris, as he recorded in his Journal, had no choice but to return down the Maumee. He went on to Detroit to rejoin the British forces. A modern view does not take Morris's narrative at face value, arguing that Pacanne's intervention implemented an early decision by the Miami chiefs to spare Morris, while also allowing a demonstration of local feelings.

On Morris's account, Bradstreet was at that point up the Sandusky River, and unaware of the threatening hostility of the Native Americans to the west. Bradstreet had reached Detroit shortly after sending Morris upriver, and returned to the Sandusky to await developments. Morris's news came through on 21 September, and revealed the Shawnee deceit; but then Bradstreet played a waiting game in September and into October, which failed, but because of bad weather.

In 1765 Morris was commander at Fort Niagara.

== Later life ==
Morris returned to England in 1767. Through the Friends to the Liberty of the Press, he and his brother Charles became associated with the radical publisher James Ridgway. He was one of the original subscribers to the Royal Literary Fund, at whose annual meetings (1794–97) he recited his own verses. On April 16, 1792, as a fundraiser for the RLF, Morris played the title role in Shakespeare’s Richard III at the Haymarket Theatre in London – the culmination of a life-long interest as theatre-goer, drama critic, actor, and playwright. The best record of his experience in the drama is his ‘Letter to a Friend on the Poetical Elocution of the Theatre and the Manner of Acting Tragedy’, published in his ‘Miscellanies’ of 1791. Morris recruited several professional actresses, including well-known performers Sarah Francis and Maria Hunter, while the other actors were amateurs including two of his sons.

He is stated in 1806 to have been living in retirement at Hampstead. He was living in Mary St, Fitzroy Sq, London at the time of his death on 30 December, 1807.

== Works ==
Morris's published volumes were:

- The Bee, a Collection of Songs, London, 1790.
- Miscellanies in Prose and Verse, 1791.
- A Life of the Rev. D. Williams, 1792. This was a biography of David Williams, founder of the Royal Literary Fund.
- Quashy, or the Coal-black Maid. A tale relative to the Slave-trade, 1796. This abolitionist poem based on slave life on Martinique was republished in New York, in Time Piece. It suggested a moral equivalence between the African rulers and British merchants engaged in the Atlantic slave trade. In his notes Morris made some intentionally shocking comments on miscegenation.

His Journal from the Miscellanies was printed in 1904 as Journal of Captain Thomas Morris, of His Majesty's XVII regiment of infantry; Detroit, 25 September 1764. It covers his expedition from Cedar Point, Ohio to Detroit. Morris published it much later, in hope of a pension. Morris's recorded views on the Native Americans were positive. The original form of the Journal was published by Peckham in 1941.

== Family ==
In 1769 Morris married Sarah (Sally) Chubb, daughter of a merchant at Bridgwater, by whom he had six children. She was the sister of well-known amateur artist John Chubb. Thomas Morris was the nephew of Lieutenant-Colonel Arthur Morris (1703-1767), also of the 17th Regiment of Foot and who also served in North America (1757-1758?).

Morris cut off his oldest child, Sophia, when she eloped at about the age of 15 and married her music teacher Martin Dingle (also Dengle). After her husband left her, Sophia lived in a London workhouse and possibly had a stroke. Her uncle, the poet Charles Morris, made an allowance of 1 shilling a week to her. Sophia died in 1807, aged 37.

== Notes ==
Attribution

This article incorporates text from a publication now in the public domain: "Morris, Charles". Dictionary of National Biography. London: Smith, Elder & Co. 1885–1900.
