= John Armstrong (frontiersman) =

American soldier and judge (1755–1816)

- Born: April 20, 1755; New Jersey
- Died: February 4, 1816 (aged 60); Clark County, Indiana

John Armstrong (April 20, 1755 – February 4, 1816) was an American soldier and judge. He was born in New Jersey. During the American Revolutionary War he served as an officer in the Continental Army with the 12th Pennsylvania Regiment and the 3rd Pennsylvania Regiment. His service record is sometimes confused with the more famous John Armstrong, Jr., a Pennsylvania officer who became U.S. Secretary of War.

Armstrong rejoined the United States Army in 1784 and served during the Northwest Indian War. In 1790, General Josiah Harmar sent him on an exploration mission in the Northwest Territory. Later that year he led a detachment of regular soldiers that accompanied Kentucky militia under Colonel John Hardin in an expedition to attack a Native American village on the Eel River. The Americans were ambushed in the battle; the militia fled and Armstrong barely escaped with his life. He resigned from the Army in March 1793.

After the war, he served as treasurer of the Northwest Territory, a judge in Hamilton County, Ohio, and as magistrate in Columbia, Ohio. He spent his final years in Clark County, Indiana, where he died.
