= Harmar campaign =

1790 US military offensive in the Northwest Indian War

- Part of the Northwest Indian War
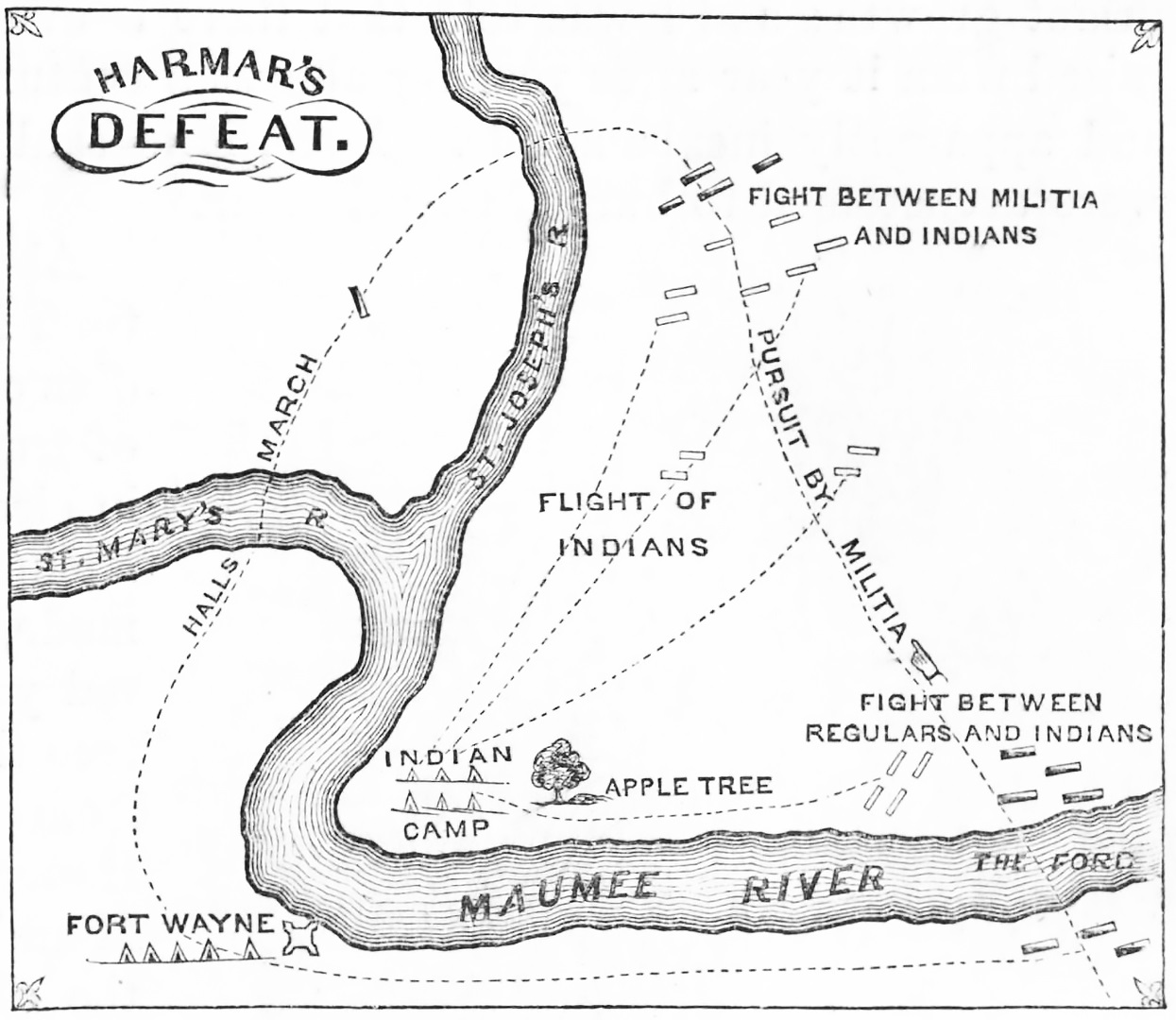
- A map of Harmar's campaign
Date	7–22 October 1790
Location	Northwest Territory (Now within present-day Fort Wayne, Indiana) 41°5′19″N 85°7′26″W
Result	Northwestern Confederacy victory

Belligerents
Northwestern Confederacy	United States

Commanders and leaders
Little Turtle; Blue Jacket; Le Gris	Josiah Harmar; John Hardin

Strength
1,050	1,420

Casualties and losses
~120–150 killed or wounded	262 killed 106 wounded

The Harmar campaign was an attempt by the United States Army to subdue confederated Native Americans nations in the Northwest Territory that were seen as hostile in Autumn 1790. The campaign was led by General Josiah Harmar and is considered a significant campaign of the Northwest Indian War. The campaign ended with a series of battles on 19–22 October 1790 near the Fort Miami and Miami village of Kekionga. These were all overwhelming victories for the Native Americans and are sometimes collectively referred to as Harmar's Defeat.

== Background ==
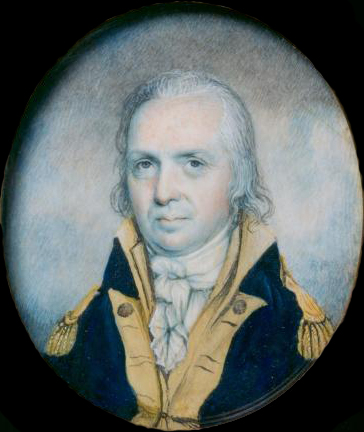
A portrait of Josiah Harmar

From 1784 to 1789, there was considerable violence between encroaching American settlers and the Shawnee and Miami Indians in Kentucky, along the Ohio River, and at the few American settlements north of the Ohio, with some 1,500 settlers killed by the Indians. However, tensions did not escalate into full-blown war. Before the American Revolutionary War, the British had tried to preserve this area as a Native American reserve but were forced to cede what became known as the Northwest Territory when the United States gained independence. American settlers were eager to enter these lands and started to do so in large numbers.

United States Secretary of War Henry Knox at first resisted calls for military action against the resident Native American nations, as the new nation was in a financial hole and had more pressing issues to address. In 1789, President George Washington wrote to Arthur St. Clair, governor of the Northwest Territory (an entity not recognized by its Native inhabitants), and asked him to determine whether the Indians living along the Wabash and Illinois Rivers were "inclined for war or peace" with the United States. St. Clair replied that the tribes "wanted war," and called for American forces to be assembled at Fort Washington (now Cincinnati, Ohio) and Vincennes, Indiana.

Washington and Knox appointed Josiah Harmar, a well-respected veteran of the Revolution, to lead these forces on a punitive expedition into Shawnee and Miami lands as retaliation for the killings of American settlers and travelers on the contested frontier, and to deter the tribes from further attacks. The heavily indebted Harmar had no practical experience fighting Native tribes and suffered from chronic alcoholism, but his appointment was not contested.

In early 1790, emissaries from the United States approached tribal leaders with word that St. Clair wished to discuss peace with the Native Americans at Vincennes. These were generally not well received and reinforced St. Clair's decision to launch an attack. American Indian attacks continued throughout the summer, but just before the campaign was to launch, a party of Miami and Potawatomi representatives arrived at Vincennes to discuss peace. Major Jean François Hamtramck, the commandant at Vincennes, refused to see them unless all American captives held by the tribes were released, a demand impossible to honor.

The primary objective of the Harmar campaign was the destruction of the Native villages located near the large Miami settlement of Kekionga (present-day Fort Wayne, Indiana), where the St. Joseph and St. Mary's rivers join to form the Maumee River. St. Clair and Harmar also planned to build an additional fort there. However, when St. Clair presented his plan to Washington at New York in August 1790, it was decided that such a fort would be too expensive and offer little military value. British forces still occupied Fort Detroit, in violation of the Treaty of Paris. St. Clair wrote to the British at Fort Detroit to assure them that the expedition was against only Indian tribes and expressed his confidence that the British would not interfere. (Note: Washington, as early as 1784, had told Henry Knox that a strong U.S. post should be established at Kekionga. St. Clair, in 1790, had told both Washington and Knox that "we will never have peace with the Western Nations until we have a garrison there." Knox, however, was concerned that a U.S. fort at Kekionga would provoke the Indians and advised against St. Clair's plan. Following Harmar's defeat, Knox changed his mind. He instructed St. Clair to occupy Kekionga the following year. Poinsatte, 21–23)

== Campaign begins ==
General Harmar gathered 320 regulars of the First American Regiment (organized into two battalions commanded by Major John Doughty and Major John Wyllys) and 1,133 militia from Kentucky and Pennsylvania, for a total of 1,453 men. The force also had a battery of three horse-drawn 6-pounder cannon. The campaign was launched from Fort Washington on 7 October 1790, when General Harmar began the march north along the Great Miami River.

A smaller force led by Major Hamtramck marched north from Vincennes at the same time. Hamtramck commanded 330 soldiers of the First American Regiment and militia from Virginia. His orders were to distract the Wabash Indians from the main force and then join Harmar for the main attack. Hamtramck's force burned a few villages over eleven days but was delayed when the militia threatened to mutiny if forced to continue. Hamtramck ultimately returned to Vincennes instead of joining Harmar, who, by 13 October, had marched to within a half day's ride of Kekionga. That day, Kentucky patrols captured a Shawnee scout who — after some intense interrogation — claimed that the Miami and Shawnee had decided to evacuate their towns rather than fight.

The residents of Kekionga and the surrounding villages quickly fled when word arrived of the American advance. Before dawn on 15 October, Harmar dispatched 600 men under Colonel John Hardin in hopes of surprising the Indians at Kekionga before they could finish evacuating. When Hardin's detachment finally reached Kekionga, they were too late to intercept the Natives. Instead, they burned the settlement along with any stores they found and encamped south of the ruins.

Harmar reached other Miami villages near Kekionga on 17 October. The Miami had warning of the attack and had evacuated their villages with as much food as they could carry. Some British-affiliated traders had been living among the Miami; they fled to Fort Detroit with their families and goods, though not before handing over any weapons and ammunition they had on hand to the Natives. The Miami also assigned scouts to shadow Harmar, gaining crucial information about the size, strength, and morale of his men. The Americans stole the tribes' food to augment their meager supplies and destroyed irreplaceable Miami artifacts and cultural sites. On the morning of 18 October, a mounted patrol under Lieutenant Colonel James Trotter rode towards the villages of the Kickapoo people. The patrol found, chased, and killed two Native Americans. A member of the patrol became separated and accidentally discovered a large enemy war party, (Note: Blue Jacket was quoted as saying "We as a people have made no war, but as a people we are determined to meet the approaches of the enemy. … We are bound as men and Indians to defend [this land], which we are determined to do, satisfied we are acting in the cause of justice." See Sword, p. 99) but after reporting this to Trotter, the patrol failed to locate them before returning to camp. Annoyed, Hardin received permission to lead a fresh reconnaissance patrol the following day.

== Battles ==
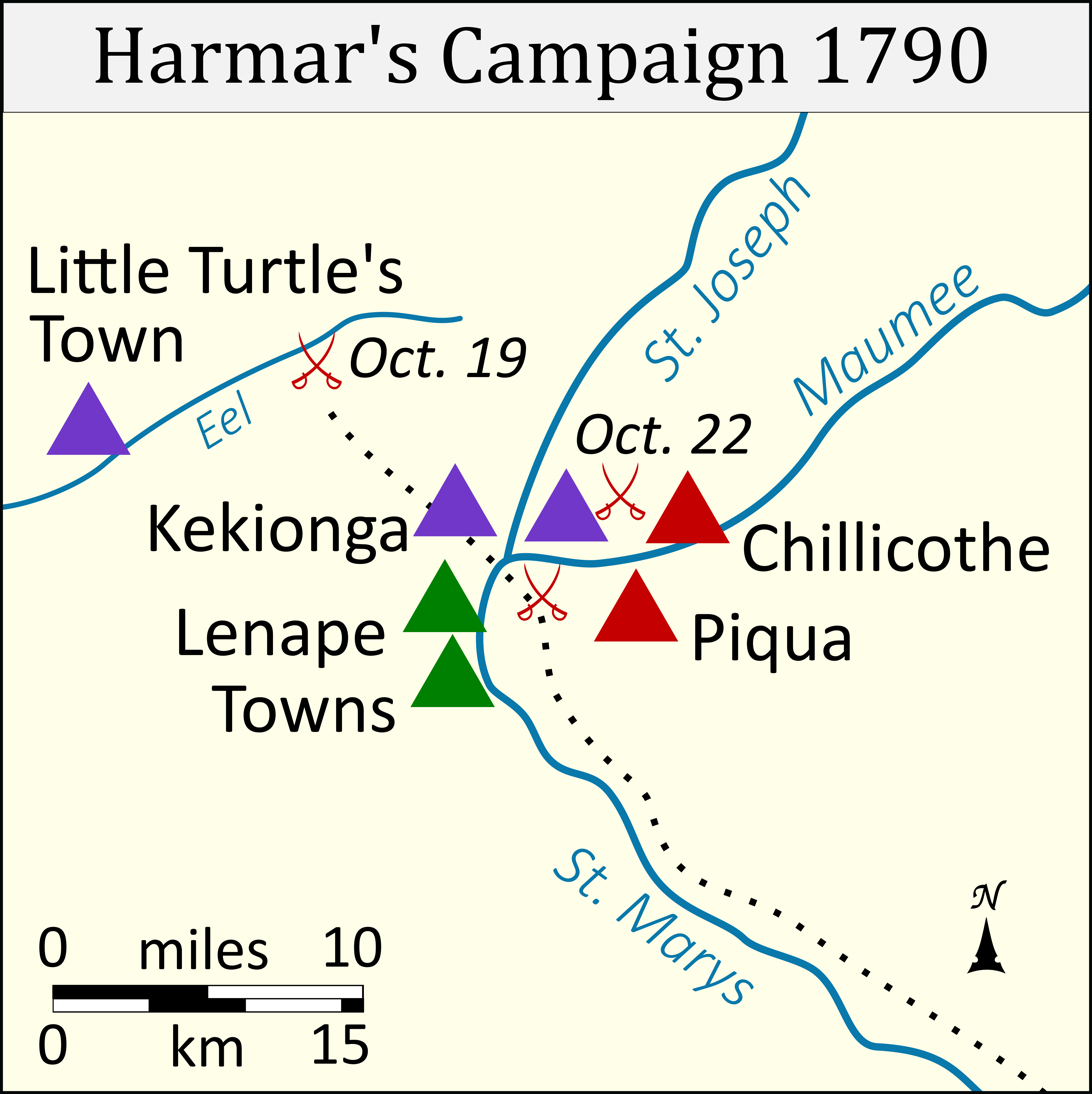

=== Hardin's defeat ===
On 19 October, Harmar moved his main force to the Shawnee town of Chillicothe, (Note: This is not the same town as modern Chillicothe, Ohio.) two miles east of Kekionga on the Maumee River. Harmar sent out a scouting party under Colonel Hardin, who led his patrol south of modern Churubusco, Indiana. The force consisted of 180 militia, a troop of cavalry under Major James Fontaine, and 30 regulars under Captain John Armstrong. The objective was to estimate the strength of the Indians and attack the village of Chief Le Gris. The party came within a few miles of Kekionga, where they encountered an Indian on horseback, who fled along a minor trail leading away from the village. Hardin ordered his force to pursue but sent Major Fontaine's cavalry back to bring up Captain William Faulkner's company, which had been left behind. The Indian was a decoy and led Hardin into a swampy lowland bordered by fallen trees and the Eel River 13 miles northwest of Kekionga, where the overburdened American horses could neither pursue nor easily retreat.

The militia was stretched out nearly a half mile when Hardin, at the head of the column, rode into the meadow. The meadow was near the village of Little Turtle, who had baited it with valuable trinkets and trade goods. The greedy militia fighters quickly broke formation before stumbling right into an ambush. The first volley came from the militia's right, killing several militia members, including the son of Kentucky militia leader Charles Scott. The U.S. force moved away to their left, where they were met with more fire at point-blank range.

Captain Armstrong formed a line of thirty regulars and eight militia, but most of the force fled past his line. Another infantry company to the rear refused to join the battle. After the U.S. line fired one round from their muskets, the Native force led by white-chief Simon Girty — mostly Miami with some Shawnee and Potawatomi — rushed them before they could reload and easily cut down most of the line with axes and knives. Only eight of the thirty regulars survived, including Captain Armstrong, who hid in the marsh by sinking into mud and water up to his neck, and Ensign Asa Hartshorne, who hid beneath a log. Major Fontaine encountered the fleeing militia, along with Captain Faulkner's missing company. They formed a new line, which Colonel Hardin joined. They spotted a few Miami warriors and held them back long enough for the remaining Americans to escape behind them. They then returned to the main encampment, where they estimated that forty militiamen were killed and 12 wounded.

Captain Armstrong arrived in camp the next morning. He blamed Hardin and the militia for the defeat and claimed that only about 100 Indians had been involved. This was the approximate number of warriors available from Kekionga and Le Gris' village. General Harmar initially refused Hardin's request to return to the battle site. Instead, he insisted that the army finish burning any nearby villages and then prepare to return to Fort Washington. The 19 October battle is sometimes referred to as "Hardin's defeat". (Note: Hardin's Defeat on 19 October 1790 was later the site of a village called Heller's Corner. ("The Battle of Kekionga". Architecture & Community Heritage · Fort Wayne, Indiana. 19 February 2015.) It is occasionally referred to as the "Battle of Heller's Corner," although the village founder would not move to the region until after 1830. (Churchward, Linda; Martin, CW (2012). "Towns of Allen County, Indiana". 19 Heller's Corner.))

=== Battle of Kekionga ===
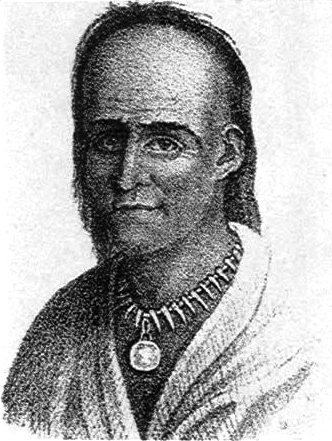
Little Turtle

On 21 October, Harmar announced that their objective was complete and ordered his forces to begin their withdrawal to Fort Washington. They marched about eight miles and made camp at the same site they had used on 16 October. That evening, scouts arrived in camp and reported that about 120 Native Americans had returned to Kekionga. The number may have been higher, as Shawnee, Miami, Lenape, Odawa, and Sauk streamed into the town.

Eager to retaliate for their earlier losses, and hoping to discourage the Native Americans from attacking the return march, Harmar organized a force under the command of Major Wyllys. The force consisted of 60 regulars, 40 mounted soldiers under Major Fontaine, and 400 militia under Colonel Hardin and Major Horatio Hall. Wyllys' force departed at 2:00 AM on 22 October. At dawn, it paused on the Maumee River and divided into four detachments led by Wyllys, Fontaine, Hall, and Hardin. Hardin and Hall moved to the west, south of the Native American towns, to establish positions on the western bank of the St. Joseph River. Wyllys, Fontaine, and Major James McMullan crossed the Maumee, planning to frighten the Indians so that they would cross the St. Joseph, where Hardin and Hall would be waiting for them.

The militias under Hardin and Hall ran into American Indians while getting into position. It is unclear who fired first, but the sound alarmed those who were in Kekionga. Wyllys ordered a full attack, but warriors hiding on the opposite bank suddenly emerged while his force was crossing. Fontaine led a cavalry charge into the wooded area and was swiftly killed. Fontaine's leaderless force withdrew. Once Wyllys and McMullan regrouped, they were harassed by small parties who fired on the militia and then retreated. McMullan's militia took the bait, drifting to the north until the regulars under Wyllys were left isolated. After a brief exchange of fire, they were trapped and forced to fight in the open at close range, with results as devastating as on 19 October. Near present-day Harmar Street, where one portion of troops had crossed the river and been ambushed, one eyewitness afterwards said he could, "walk across the Maumee River on the bodies of dead men." Survivors fled across the St. Joseph to join the U.S. detachments under Hardin. The Shawnee and Miami then began attacking Hardin from three sides. Expecting reinforcements from Harmar, Hardin defended his position for over three hours before finally falling back to join the rest of the army.

Hall, meanwhile, crossed the St. Joseph to the north, and joined up with McMullan. They marched together to Kekionga and prepared for another engagement, but finding it quiet, they returned to join the main force under Harmar. Both Hardin and Hall met with Kentucky Major James Ray, just three miles from camp. Harmar had sent Ray to assist in the battle, along with the only thirty men willing to go. In this battle, sometimes known as "Harmar's defeat" by the Americans, 180 American men were either killed or wounded. The army forces reported 129 men killed in action (14 officers, including Wyllys and Fontaine, and 115 enlisted men) and 94 wounded (including 50 of the regulars). Estimates of Indian casualties range from 120 to 150.

== Aftermath ==
After such high casualties from these engagements, General Harmar determined that he could not attack again. The weather was turning bitterly cold, supplies were exhausted, most of his surviving force had deserted, and he had lost too many packhorses. The retreating force reached Fort Washington on 3 November. Native American leaders considered a final, decisive blow to Harmar's shattered army, but the Odawa reportedly departed for home, interpreting a lunar eclipse as a sign that they should not attack. In any case, the tribes needed to shift their attention towards finding food and shelter for those whose homes and stores had been destroyed. Important Miami artifacts were also lost in the evacuation, destroying history and culture that has never been recovered. Following the attacks, the Native American confederacy moved their capital away from Kekionga to the more easily defendable banks of the Auglaize River.

Harmar's losses were the worst defeat of U.S. forces by Indians up to that time. It was surpassed by St. Clair's defeat in 1791 and the Battle of the Little Bighorn in the late 19th century in the West. Little Turtle became established as an Indian hero, and the Indians in the Northwest Territory were emboldened to continue to resist the United States. Although the campaign was intended to pacify American Indian nations, Harmar's defeat led to increased attacks on U.S. settlements all across the Northwest Territory, both out of revenge and to replace the crops destroyed by Harmar. These attacks including the January 1791 Big Bottom massacre and the Siege of Dunlap's Station.

President Washington was furious at the news of the defeat and lamented "my mind... is prepared for the worst; that is, for expence without honor or profit." He and St. Clair feared that the campaign would embolden the confederacy. Senator William Maclay of Pennsylvania accused the administration of starting a war without the authorization of Congress, even suggesting that Washington had manufactured the crisis so he could establish a standing army under his control. That December, General Von Steuben wrote to Alexander Hamilton, lamenting the loss of Major Wyllys and expressing fear for Major Hamtramck. "This war is not over, it is only the Commencement of the Hostilities, so will we never learn to be wise except by force of stupidity?"

A court-martial in 1791 cleared Harmar of any wrongdoing during the campaign. Despite the heavy losses, Harmar considered his main objective accomplished. Five villages had been destroyed by evacuating villagers or by his army, and tens of thousands of bushels of grain had been taken or destroyed. Nevertheless, John Cleves Symmes, a prominent leader of the settlers, said the panic caused by the tactical Native victory would discourage new settlers from moving to the Ohio territory.

Because they were both present when Harmar's army arrived, this was the first full military operation shared between Miami leader Little Turtle and Shawnee leader Blue Jacket. William Wells reported that Little Turtle led the defense against Hardin, while Blue Jacket led the Shawnee, Buckongahelas the Delaware, and Egushawa the Odawa. Wells, who was Little Turtle's son-in-law, later claimed that Little Turtle was in overall command; but Wayne and Wilkinson both believed that Blue Jacket was in overall command. Learning of the defeats, Congress raised a second regiment of regular soldiers for six months, but it later reduced the soldiers' pay. The First Regiment was reduced to 299 soldiers, while the new Second Regiment recruited only half of their authorized number. When Governor St. Clair led a similar expedition the next year, he had to call out the militia to meet the required manpower even though they were considered largely responsible for Harmar's failed campaign.

== Analysis ==
Historical analysis of the Harmar campaign has been difficult. Eyewitness accounts contradict one another on key points, and Native American accounts are not well documented. A great deal of mistrust was present between the U.S. regulars and the militia. Knox had hoped that veteran frontier fighters from Pennsylvania and Kentucky would join the campaign, but notable militia leaders refused to participate, and enlisted pay was very low, especially during the harvest season when farmers offered higher wages to workers. Few experienced frontiersmen took part in the campaign; many instead paid recent immigrants to take their place. Lieutenant Ebenezer Denny wrote that the militia "appear to be raw and unused to the gun or the woods," and many arrived unfit for duty or unarmed.

The troops were assembled in September, and the campaign had to be completed before winter set in, or the pack horses which carried the troops' supplies would starve for lack of grazing vegetation. This lack of time meant that the new troops were taught little beyond how to load and shoot. Harmar viewed the militia with contempt, and the militia reciprocated by accusing Harmar of drunkenness, cowardice, and incompetence. The forces under Harmar had considerable trouble moving through the woodlands. There were no suitable roads, resulting in precious hours being wasted as the Americans cut their way through the backcountry, and over a third of the packhorses leased for the campaign were lost through negligence or theft. Army contracts promised compensation for horses that died while in service, giving farmers an incentive to provide weak or ill animals they had no use for.

Major Hamtramck's western wing had been forced to turn back early, and he thought his mission had been a failure. However, he later learned that a force of 600 warriors had been sent in pursuit of him. Since his primary mission was to divert attention away from Harmar's main force, his mission had arguably been accomplished.

== See also ==
- Fort Miami (Indiana)
- Fort Wayne (fort)
- Fort Wayne (city)
- Kekionga
