= Arthur St. Clair =

Scottish-born American military officer and politician (1737–1818)

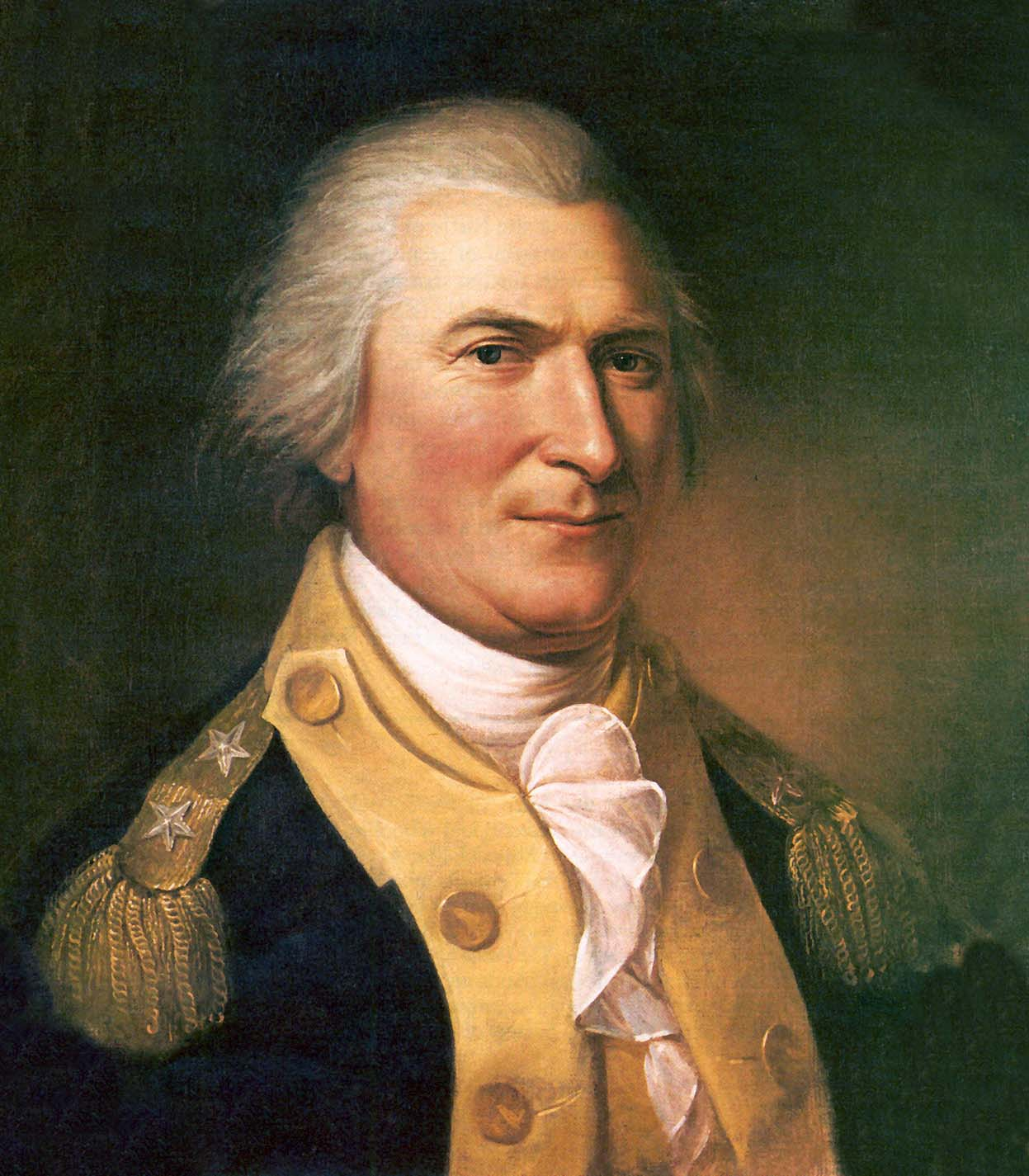
- Portrait by Charles Willson Peale, c. 1783

1st Governor of the Northwest Territory
- In office 15 July 1788 – 22 November 1802
- Preceded by: Position established
- Succeeded by: Charles Willing Byrd

4th Senior Officer of the United States Army
- In office 4 March 1791 – 5 March 1792
- President: George Washington
- Preceded by: Josiah Harmar
- Succeeded by: Anthony Wayne

9th President of the Confederation Congress
- In office 2 February 1787 – 4 November 1787
- Preceded by: Nathaniel Gorham
- Succeeded by: Cyrus Griffin

Personal details
- Born: 23 March 1737 Thurso, Caithness, Scotland
- Died: 31 August 1818 (aged 81) Greensburg, Pennsylvania, U.S.
- Resting place: St. Clair Park, Greensburg
- Party: Federalist
- Education: University of Edinburgh

Military service
- Allegiance: Kingdom of Great Britain; United States
- Branch/service: British Army (1757–1762); Continental Army (1775–1783); United States Army (1791–1792)
- Rank: Lieutenant (Britain); Major General (U.S.)
- Battles/wars: French and Indian War; Siege of Louisbourg; Battle of the Plains of Abraham; Lord Dunmore's War; American Revolutionary War; Invasion of Quebec; Battle of Trois-Rivières; Battle of Trenton; Battle of Princeton; Siege of Fort Ticonderoga; Siege of Yorktown; Northwest Indian War; St. Clair's defeat

Arthur St. Clair (March 23, 1737 [O.S. 1736] – 31 August 1818) was a Scottish-born American military officer and politician. Born in Thurso, Caithness, he served in the British Army during the French and Indian War before settling in the Province of Pennsylvania. During the American Revolutionary War, he rose to the rank of major general in the Continental Army, but lost his command after a controversial retreat from Fort Ticonderoga.

After the war, he served as President of the Continental Congress, which during his term passed the Northwest Ordinance. He was then made governor of the Northwest Territory in 1788, which was further enlarged by the portion that would become Ohio in 1800. In 1791, he commanded an American army in St. Clair's defeat, which became the greatest victory achieved by Native Americans against the United States. Politically out-of-step with the Jefferson administration, he was replaced as governor in 1802 and died in obscurity.

== Early life and career ==
St. Clair was born in Thurso, Caithness. Little is known of his early life. Early biographers estimated his year of birth as 1734, but subsequent historians uncovered a birth date of 23 March 1736, which in the modern calendar system means that he was born in 1737. His parents, unknown to early biographers, were probably William Sinclair, a merchant, and Elizabeth Balfour. He reportedly attended the University of Edinburgh before being apprenticed to the renowned physician William Hunter.

In 1757, St. Clair purchased a commission in the British Army's Royal American Regiment and came to North America with Admiral Edward Boscawen's fleet for the French and Indian War. He served under General Jeffery Amherst during the capture of Louisburg, Nova Scotia, on 26 July 1758. On 17 April 1759, he was promoted to lieutenant and assigned under the command of General James Wolfe, under whom he served at the Battle of the Plains of Abraham which resulted in the capture of Quebec City.

== Settler in America ==
On 16 April 1762, St. Clair resigned his commission, and by 1764 had settled in Ligonier Valley, Pennsylvania, where he purchased land and went into business as an operator of flour and grist mills. The fortune he amassed soon made him the largest landowner west of the Allegheny Mountains.

In 1770, St. Clair entered politics when he was elected as a justice of both the Court of Quarter Sessions and of Common Pleas. He subsequently served as a member of the proprietary council, a justice, recorder, and clerk of the orphans' court, and prothonotary of Bedford and Westmoreland counties.

In 1774, during Lord Dunmore's War, the colony of Virginia illegally took claim of the area around present-day Pittsburgh. A militia was quickly raised to drive off the Virginians and St. Clair, in his capacity as a magistrate, issued an order for the arrest of the officer leading the Virginia troops. The boundary dispute between Virginia and Pennsylvania wasn't settled until 1780, when both sides agreed to extend the Mason–Dixon line westward from Maryland to 80° 31′ west, the current western border of Pennsylvania. (see: District of West Augusta)

== Revolutionary War ==
By the mid-1770s, St. Clair considered himself more of an American than a British subject. In January 1776, he accepted a commission in the Continental Army as a colonel of the 3rd Pennsylvania Regiment. He first saw service in the final days of the failed Quebec invasion, where he saw action in the Battle of Trois-Rivières. He was appointed a brigadier general in August 1776 and was tasked by George Washington to help train and equip newly arrived recruits from New Jersey. He took part in George Washington's crossing of the Delaware River on the night of 25–26 December 1776, before the Battle of Trenton on the morning of 26 December. Many biographers credit St. Clair with the strategy that led to Washington's capture of Princeton, New Jersey, on 3 January 1777. St. Clair was promoted to major general in February 1777.

In April 1777, St. Clair was given command of Fort Ticonderoga. His outnumbered garrison could not resist British General John Burgoyne's larger force in the Saratoga campaign; thus, St. Clair was forced to retreat at the resulting siege on 5 July 1777. He successfully evacuated his men, but choosing not to stand and fight permanently damaged his sterling reputation. In 1778, he was court-martialed for the loss of Ticonderoga. The court exonerated him and approved his return to duty, but he would never hold a command again during the Revolution. He still saw action, however, as an aide-de-camp to Washington, who retained a high opinion of him. St. Clair was at Yorktown when Lord Cornwallis surrendered his army. During his military service, St. Clair was elected a member of the American Philosophical Society in 1780.

== President of the United States in Congress Assembled ==
Following his discharge from the Army, St. Clair was elected to the Pennsylvania Council of Censors in 1783 and served as a delegate to the Confederation Congress, serving from 2 November 1785, until 28 November 1787. Chaos ruled the day in early 1787 with Shays's Rebellion in full force and the states refusing to settle their disputes or contribute to the now six-year-old federal government. On 2 February 1787, the delegates finally gathered into a quorum and elected St. Clair to a one-year term as President of the Continental Congress. Congress enacted its most important piece of legislation, the Northwest Ordinance, during his tenure. Time was running out for the Confederation Congress, however; during St. Clair's presidency, the Philadelphia Convention was drafting a new United States Constitution, which would abolish the old Congress. St. Clair is the only foreign-born "president" of the United States.

== Northwest Territory ==
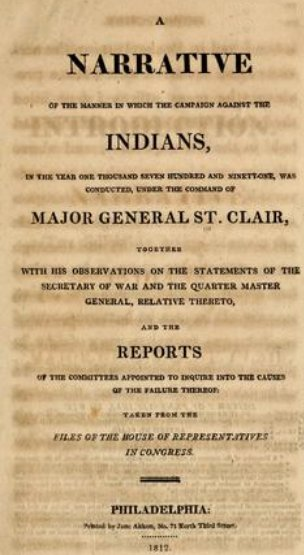
A Narrative printed by Jane Aitken

Under the Northwest Ordinance of 1787, which created the Northwest Territory, St. Clair was appointed governor of what is now Ohio, Indiana, Illinois, Michigan, Wisconsin and part of Minnesota. He named Cincinnati, Ohio, to honor his membership in the Society of the Cincinnati, and it was there that he decided to relocate his home.

As governor, he formulated "Maxwell's Code" (named after its printer, William Maxwell), the first written laws of the territory. He also worked with Josiah Harmar, Senior Officer of the United States, to resolve the issue of Native American tribes refusing to leave their lands, which the federal government had seized as punishment for their support of the British during the Revolution. In 1789, the two men succeeded in getting several Native American tribal leaders to sign the Treaty of Fort Harmar, but the treaty was never fully implemented and the tribes rejected it outright as illegitimate.

Supported with intelligence, supplies, and weapons provided to them by the British Indian Department, the tribes decided to wage full-scale war against the Americans in what came to be called the Northwest Indian War (or "Little Turtle's War"). Harmar was ordered by President Washington's administration to crush the Indians with a force mainly composed of ill-disciplined and inexperienced state militiamen; he suffered a humiliating defeat in October 1790.

=== Army commander ===
In March 1791, St. Clair succeeded the disgraced Harmar as Senior Officer of the new United States Army and was restored to his previous rank of major general. He personally led a punitive expedition, this time with two full Army regiments and a large contingent of militia. St. Clair had far more experience commanding troops than Harmar and his force was properly supplied and organized; unfortunately, like Harmar, St. Clair was also devoid of any practical experience in frontier warfare and generally dismissive of the Indians as fighters. In October 1791, he ordered the construction of Fort Jefferson to serve as the advance post for his campaign. Located in present-day Darke County in far western Ohio, the fort was built of wood and intended primarily as a supply depot; accordingly, it was originally named "Fort Deposit".

=== St. Clair's defeat ===
In November 1791, near modern-day Fort Recovery, St. Clair advanced on the main Indian settlements at the head of the Wabash River. On 4 November, they were routed in battle by a tribal confederation led by Miami chief Little Turtle and Shawnee chief Blue Jacket. More than 600 American soldiers and scores of camp followers were killed in the battle, which came to be known as "St. Clair's Defeat"; other names include the "Battle of the Wabash", the "Columbia Massacre," or the "Battle of a Thousand Slain". It remains the greatest defeat U.S. forces suffered at the hands of Native Americans in history, with 97% of the 1,000-strong American army being either killed, wounded, or captured while only 21 Natives were killed. 279 Americans were wounded, including St. Clair and Captain Robert Benham.

=== Continued as Governor 1788-1802 ===
Although an investigation exonerated him, St. Clair surrendered his commission in March 1792 at the request of President Washington before resuming his previous office as territorial governor.

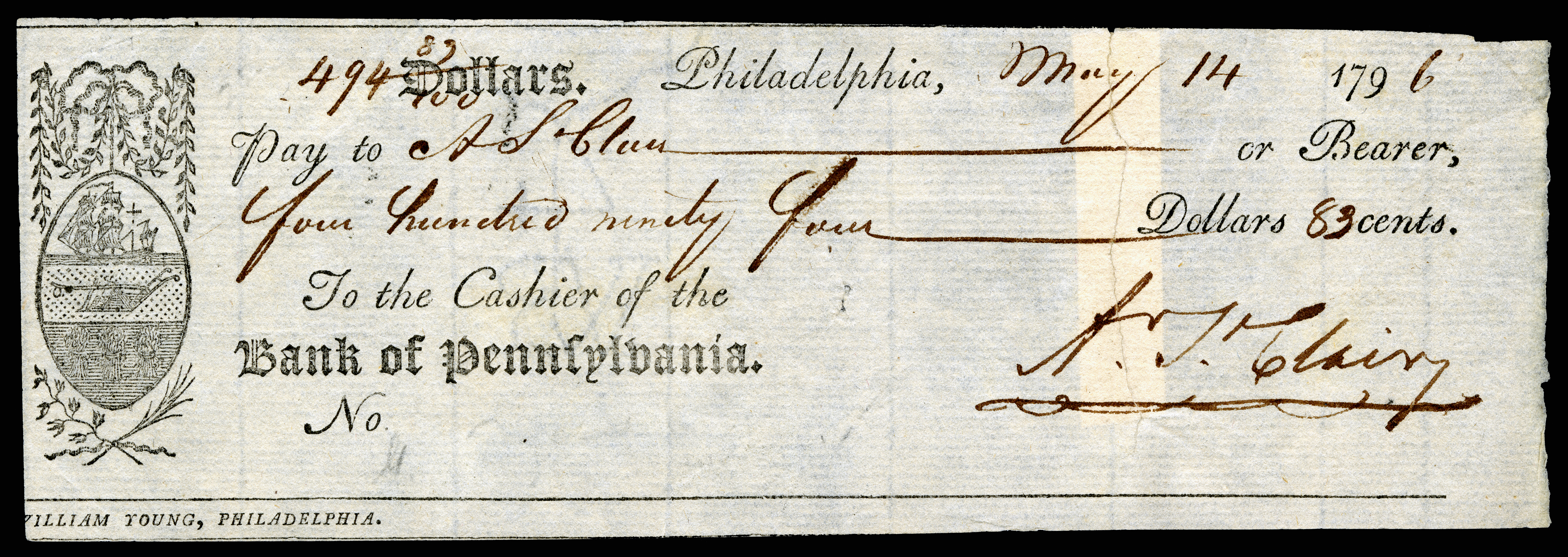
St. Clair signed check while Governor of Northwest Territory (1796)

A Federalist, St. Clair refocused his energies on carving up the Northwest Territory into two states that would strengthen Federalist control of Congress. However, he was opposed by Ohio Democrat-Republicans for what they perceived as his shameless partisanship, high-handedness, and arrogance in office. In 1802, he declared that his constituents "are no more bound by an act of Congress than we would be bound by an edict of the first consul of France." This, coupled with the gradual collapse of Federalist influence in Washington D.C., led President Thomas Jefferson to remove him as governor. He thus played no part in the organizing of the state of Ohio in 1803.

The first Ohio Constitution provided for a weak governor and a strong legislature, largely as a reaction to St. Clair's method of governance.

== Family life ==
St. Clair met Phoebe Bayard, a member of one of the most prominent families in Boston, and they were married in 1760. Miss Bayard's mother's maiden name was Bowdoin, and she was the sister of James Bowdoin, a colonial governor of Massachusetts. They had seven children together. His eldest daughter was Louisa St. Clair Robb, a mounted messenger and scout, and known as a beautiful huntress.

Like many of his Revolutionary-era peers, St. Clair suffered from gout due to poor diet, as noted in his correspondence with John Adams.

== Death ==
In retirement, St. Clair lived with his daughter Louisa and her family on the ridge between Ligonier and Greensburg.

Arthur St. Clair died in poverty in Greensburg, Pennsylvania, on 31 August 1818, at the age of 81. His remains are buried under a Masonic monument in St. Clair Park in downtown Greensburg. St. Clair had been a petitioner for a Charter for Nova Caesarea Lodge #10 in Cincinnati, Ohio, in 1791. This Lodge exists today, as Nova Caesarea Harmony #2. His wife Phoebe died shortly after and is buried beside him.

== Legacy ==
A portion of the Hermitage, St. Clair's home in Oak Grove, Pennsylvania (north of Ligonier), was later moved to Ligonier, Pennsylvania, where it is now preserved, along with St. Clair artifacts and memorabilia at the Fort Ligonier Museum.

An American Civil War steamer was named USS St. Clair.

Lydia Sigourney included a poem in his honor, General St. Clair. in her first poetry collection of 1815.

The site of Clair's inauguration as Governor of the Northwest Territory is now occupied by the National Start Westward Memorial of The United States, commemorating the settlement of the territory.

Places named in honor of Arthur St. Clair include:

In Pennsylvania:

- Upper St. Clair, Pennsylvania
- St. Clairsville, Pennsylvania
- St. Clair Schuylkill County, Pennsylvania
- St. Clair Township, Westmoreland County, Pennsylvania
- East St. Clair Township, Bedford County, Pennsylvania
- West St. Clair Township, Bedford County, Pennsylvania
- The St. Clair neighborhood in Pittsburgh, Pennsylvania
- St. Clair Hospital, Mt. Lebanon, Pennsylvania

In Ohio:

- St. Clair Township in Butler County, Ohio
- St. Clair Township in Columbiana County, Ohio,
- St. Clairsville, Ohio
- St. Clair Avenue in Cleveland, Ohio
- St. Clair Street in Dayton, Ohio
- St. Clair Street in Toledo, Ohio
- St. Clair Street in Marietta, Ohio
- Fort St. Clair in Eaton, Ohio

Other States:

- St. Clair County, Illinois
- St. Clair Street in Indianapolis, Indiana
- St. Clair County, Missouri
- St. Clair County, Alabama
- St. Clair Street in Frankfort, Kentucky, was named for the St. Clair by Gen. James Wilkinson, who laid out the town that became the state capital. The street's north end is at the Old Capitol, and near its south end is the Franklin County Court House; both were designed by Gideon Shryock.

In Scotland:

- The three-star St Clair Hotel in Sinclair St, Thurso, Caithness, is named after him.

Party political offices
First	Federalist nominee for Governor of Pennsylvania; 1790	Succeeded by Frederick Muhlenberg
Political offices
Preceded by Nathaniel Gorham	President of the Continental Congress; 2 February 1787 – 4 November 1787	Succeeded by Cyrus Griffin
New office	Governor of the Northwest Territory; 15 July 1788 – 22 November 1802	Succeeded by Charles Willing Byrd
Military offices
Preceded by Joseph Reed	Adjutant Generals of the U. S. Army; 22 January 1777 – 20 February 1777 (acting)	Succeeded by George Weedon (acting)
Preceded by Josiah Harmar	Senior Officer of the United States Army; 1791–1792	Succeeded by Anthony Wayne
