= Josiah Harmar =

US Army officer (1753–1813)

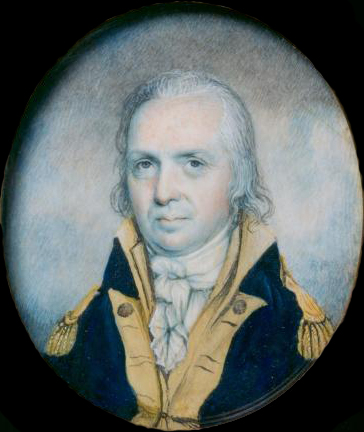
- Harmar, c. 1799–1803

3rd Senior Officer of the United States Army
- In office August 12, 1784 – March 4, 1791
- President: George Washington
- Preceded by: John Doughty
- Succeeded by: Arthur St. Clair

Personal details
- Born: November 10, 1753 Philadelphia, Pennsylvania, British America
- Died: August 20, 1813 (aged 59) Philadelphia, Pennsylvania, U.S.
- Resting place: Saint James of Kingsessing Churchyard, Philadelphia

Military service
- Allegiance: United States
- Branch/service: Continental Army; United States Army
- Years of service: 1775–1783, 1784–1792
- Rank: Lieutenant Colonel; Brevet Brigadier General
- Commands: First American Regiment
- Battles/wars: American Revolutionary War; Battle of Quebec; Valley Forge; Northwest Indian War; Harmar Campaign

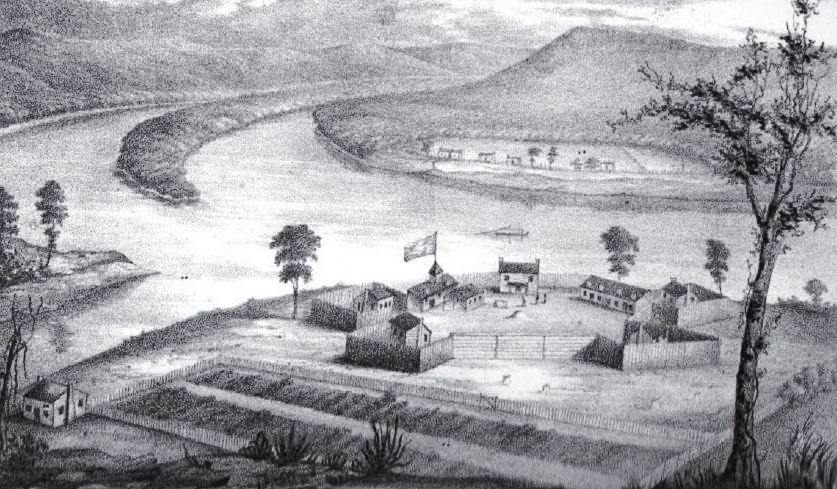
Fort Harmar

Josiah Harmar (November 10, 1753 – August 20, 1813) was an officer in the United States Army during the American Revolutionary War and the Northwest Indian War. He was the senior officer in the Army for six years and seven months (August 1784 to March 1791).

== Early life ==
Josiah Harmar was born in Philadelphia, Province of Pennsylvania, and educated at a Quaker school.

== American Revolution ==
Harmar started his military career during the Revolutionary War, receiving a commission as a captain in 1775. In 1775, Harmar first saw action during the American invasion of Canada, fighting in the Battle of Quebec. He served primarily under George Washington and "Light-Horse" Henry Lee. Harmar also served as a staff officer of Washington's during the 1777-1778 winter at Valley Forge. Washington had a high opinion of Harmar during the Revolutionary War, writing that Harmar was one of the "gentlemen...personally known to me as one of the best officers in the Army". By the end of the war, Harmar was serving as adjutant to General Nathanael Greene, who commanded the Continental Army in the South. A lieutenant colonel at its conclusion, he was chosen by Congress in 1784 to relay the ratified Treaty of Paris to commissioner Benjamin Franklin in Paris. During his time in France, Harmar was received at the Palace of Versailles by King Louis XVI and Queen Marie Antoinette, being introduced to the king and queen by the Marquis de Lafayette. In Paris, Harmar lived lavishly and beyond his means; burdened by debt, he soon left for the United States. Harmar wrote "the expenses which must necessarily be incurred in living in, and in viewing this magnificent city [Paris] demand for the benefit of the United States my speedy embarkation".

Harmar was an original member of the Pennsylvania Society of the Cincinnati when it was founded on October 4, 1783. The same day, he was elected as the Society's first secretary, a position he held for two years. Harmar married Sarah C. Jenkins on 10 October 1784 in Philadelphia.

== Service in the Northwest Territory ==
In the 1780s, many Americans wished to settle the "Old Northwest" as the Midwest was known at the time, which of course meant displacing the Indian tribes living there. Supported by the British who still held fur-trading forts in the Old Northwest, the Indians of the Western Confederacy were resolved to oppose the Americans. The newly independent United States had almost no army, as the Continental Army had been disbanded with the Treaty of Paris in 1783. In 1784, the entire United States Army comprised just 55 artillerymen at West Point and 25 regulars at Fort Pitt (modern Pittsburgh). The weak central government was thus dependent on state militias, which were notoriously undertrained, ill-disciplined, badly funded, and loath to fight outside their home states. To enforce American claims upon the Old Northwest, on 3 June 1784, Congress authorized the first federal regiment, known as the First American Regiment, of about seven hundred men, to be supplied and paid for by Pennsylvania, New Jersey, New York and Connecticut.

As the largest contingent (about 260 men) came from Pennsylvania, the Commonwealth of Pennsylvania was allowed to choose the commander of the regiment. Thomas Mifflin, an influential state politician and favorite of Washington's, successfully pushed for Harmar to be named commander. This was despite Harmar's limited command experience, unfamiliarity with Indian diplomacy, and chronic alcoholism which had only worsened due to his lackluster financial situation. Harmar's first task was to train the First American Regiment, imposing a rigorous training regime to create what was intended to be the core of a new United States Army. The general was known as a strict disciplinarian who would punish his soldiers harshly if their uniforms were dirty or rust appeared on their weapons. Harmar reported to Congress in September 1784 that his emphasis upon Prussian-style drill and discipline was having results as "the troops begin to have a just idea of the noble profession of arms". Shortly afterwards, orders arrived to march to Fort Pitt with his forces and begin clearing the Northwest for American settlements. Harmar was not impressed with the people of Fort Pitt, writing that they "lived in dirty log cabins and were prone to find joy in liquor and fighting".

As commander of the First American Regiment, Harmar was the senior officer in the United States Army from 1784 to 1791, commanding from the Revolutionary-era Fort McIntosh. Initially, the First American Regiment was to be based in Fort Pitt, but as the Indian chiefs he was to negotiate with did not want to travel far from their homes, Harmar relocated his command to Fort McIntosh. Harmar described Fort McIntosh when he found it as having been thoroughly looted by settlers heading for Kentucky, writing the settlers had "destroyed the gates, drawn all the Nails from the roofs, taken off the boards and plundered it of every article". Harmar was impressed with the richness of the land of the Northwest. In 1785, he wrote to a friend: "I wish you were here to view the beauties of Fort M'Intosh. What think you of pike of 24 lbs, a perch of 15 to 20 lbs, cat-fish of 40 lbs, bass, pickerel, sturgeon &c &c. You would certainly enjoy yourself." Harmar also enjoyed the strawberries growing in the wild, writing: "The earth is most luxuriantly covered with them – we have them in such plenty that I am almost surfeited with them; the addition of fine rich cream is not lacking". He continued to struggle with alcohol; fellow officers noted that he drank excessive amounts of wine, cognac, whiskey and rum with meals. In a letter to his patron Mifflin, Harmar stated that stories of "Venison, two or three inches deep cut of fat, turkey at once pence per pound, buffalo in abundance and catfish of one hundred pounds that are by no means exaggerated", going on to write that "cornfields, gardens &c, now appear in places which were lately the habitation of wild beasts. Such are the glories of industry."

Harmar signed the Treaty of Fort McIntosh on 21 January 1785, the same year that he ordered the construction of Fort Harmar near what is now Marietta, Ohio. Harmar did not think the treaty that he had just signed with the Delaware, Ottawa, Chippewa, and Wyandot, ceding what is now southeastern Ohio to the United States, to be worth much, writing: "Between you and me, vain and ineffectual all treaties will be, until we take possession of the posts. One treaty held at Detroit would give dignity and consequence to the United States, and answer every purpose".

Until the creation of the Northwest Territory in 1787, the Northwest had no government beyond the U.S. Army, and even after the creation of the Northwest Territory, the area was administered by the War Department for several more years. At this time, hundreds of American settlers, anxious to acquire the rich lands beyond the Ohio River, had begun to illegally settle in the Old Northwest, and in March 1785, Harmar was ordered by Congress to evict the squatters as no land surveys had been performed yet nor had the U.S. government started the work of selling the land. Harmar described the evictions as a painful process as his soldiers had to force the settlers off their newly build homesteads and in his letters to Congress, the general asked that the land be promptly surveyed and sold before the entire Northwest was overrun by "lawless bands whose actions are a disgrace to human nature". In May 1785, Thomas Hutchins was appointed "Geographer of the United States" by Congress and was ordered to go to the Northwest to conduct surveys, starting with the Seven Ranges. Harmar was ordered by Congress to escort and assist the land surveyors in their duties.

In September 1785, when Hutchins and his assistants arrived, Harmar assured him that he "very safely repair with the Surveyors in the intersection of Pennsylvania with the Ohio". In October 1785, Harmar exercised his authority to build a new fort, named for himself, to base his men while the surveys were performed. At Fort Harmar, he supplied himself with expensive luxuries such as Windsor chairs, which led the American historian Wiley Sword to write that Harmar's "considerable urbanity may have rendered him somewhat suspect as an Indian fighter". In November 1785, Harmar reported to Congress that the early arrival of winter together with the fact that soldiers who were guarding the surveyors from Indians and squatters were "barefoot and miserably off for clothing" had ended the surveying for that year.

One Indian tribe who refused to sign a treaty giving up their lands was the Shawnee, and Harmar was ordered in October 1785 to advance to the Great Miami River against them. At the time, Congress took the viewpoint that the Indians living in the Old Northwest had by supporting the British in the Revolutionary War forfeited their land, from which they were to be evicted from, and the land handed over to American settlers. The Indians did not share this viewpoint that they were defeated peoples living on a land that rightfully belonged to the Americans, and many began to resist efforts to evict them.

As a commander, Harmar was a stern martinet who was much influenced by Baron Friedrich Wilhelm von Steuben's manual Regulations for the Order and Discipline of the Troops of the United States, better known as the "Blue Book" for the training of American troops. The American historian William Guthman noted: "Steuben's manual was aimed at combatting British and Hessian forces – not the backwoods guerilla fighting of the highly skilled American Indian warriors the regiment would eventually fight. Short-sightedness on the part of the military was the reason that no preparatory training in guerrilla warfare was ever imposed on the Army... no federal unit under Harmar or St. Clair was ever instructed in the frontiersmen's method of war". Harmar, having no practical experience in Indian fighting, doggedly chose to train his men in this increasingly outmoded style rather than adapting them to the rigors of wilderness combat. Steuben, as chief trainer of the Continental Army, had introduced Prussian drill and discipline, turning the ragtag Continental Army into a formidable force. It is very unlikely that the Americans would have won the Revolutionary War without Steuben's training, and as a result, Steuben was greatly admired by many American officers. One of those officers was Harmar, who at the time of his death in 1813, was still insisting to anyone who would listen that all that was needed for victory was to follow the precepts laid down in the Blue Book.

Harmar also supervised the construction of Fort Steuben near present-day Steubenville, Ohio. In June 1787, he reported to Congress that the Seven Ranges had been surveyed, and the white settlers could finally legally move in. He was brevetted as a brigadier general in July 1787. On 17 July 1787, Harmar visited Vincennes, at the time a mostly French-Canadian town, where he was welcomed by the "principle French inhabitants" and where he informed them that the area was now part of the United States. The people of Vincennes' previous encounters with the Americans had been with the lawless Kentucky militia, which led Harmar, in a letter to the people of Vincennes, to tell them that the men they met before were "not real Americans". During his time at Vincennes, several Indian chiefs came to visit him, where Harmar sought to "impress upon them as much as possible the majesty of the United States" and the wish of the U.S. government "to live in peace with them". Harmar then visited Cahokia and Kaskaskia whose inhabitants had not seen any representatives of the U.S. government since the Revolutionary War, and who Harmar reported had shown "decent submission & respect" for the U.S. government. Harmar was finally received at St. Louis by Major Francisco Cruzat of the Spanish Army where Harmar reported he was "politely entertained" while noting that the entire Spanish garrison at St. Louis numbered only 20 men.

In April 1788, Harmar greeted an old comrade, Rufus Putnam of the Ohio Land Company, who had promoted "Putnam's Paradise" in New England and later founded the village of Marietta next to Fort Harmar. Harmar reported in June 1788 that between December 1787-June 1788 at least 6,000 settlers had passed through Fort Harmar on their way to found settlements beyond the Ohio river, writing "The Emigration is almost incredible". At the new village of Marietta, Harmar celebrated the Fourth of July in 1788 with Putnam, having his regiment march down the street in a parade. At Fort Harmar, he built a "commodious fine house...an elegant building for this wooden part of the world", where his wife and his son Charles joined him.

As more and more settlers moved into the Northwest, more and more reports of violence between the settlers and the Indians reached Fort Harmar. Harmar complained that the government was tardy with paying his men or furnishing needed supplies, to which he was informed that because fewer than the requisite nine states were represented in Congress due to political disputes, it was impossible to pass a military budget. For this reason, Harmar welcomed the United States Constitution of 1787, which replaced the Articles of Confederation, expressing the hope that with a newly strong federal government, "Anarchy and Confusion will now leave and that a vigorous government will take its place".

With low-level warfare in the Northwest between the Indians and the settlers now the norm, Harmar, joined by Governor of the Northwest Territory Arthur St. Clair, started talks in January 1789 with Indian leaders representing the remaining Iroquois, the Ottawa, Chippewa, Wyandot, Potawatomi, Sauk, and Lenape peoples, where the Indians were informed that they could either sell their land for a set price or face war. Both St. Clair and Harmar refused the Indian demand that no more white settlement be allowed beyond the Ohio River, and the resulting Treaty of Fort Harmar saw more land ceded to the United States. None of the Indian peoples living on the Wabash River attended the conference, having not been invited, and Harmar predicted that this would mean war with the Miami, the Shawnee and those Potawatomi living on the Wabash. One of Harmar's aides called the Treaty of Fort Harmar a "farce", done to placate Congress and the American public, and predicted that the Western Confederacy would fight.

Harmer directed the construction in 1789 of Fort Washington on the Ohio River (located in modern-day Cincinnati), which was built to protect the southern settlements in the Northwest Territory. Harmar arrived at the fort on December 28, 1789, and welcomed Governor St. Clair there three days later. By August 1789, enough reports had reached President Washington of widespread violence in the Northwest that he decided the situation required the "immediate intervention of the General Government". War was now inevitable.

Harmar's relations with his superiors were not good. President Washington's War Secretary, Henry Knox, was a firm believer that the nation's first line of defense should be the state militias and was hostile to the very idea of a standing army. Knox was a Revolutionary War veteran with a distinguished record, but as War Secretary, he proved to be an unsavory character whose principal interest was engaging in land speculation. As Secretary of War, Knox openly sold seized Indian land at rock-bottom prices to land companies (in which he happened to be a shareholder), which then marked up the land and sold it to American settlers. At the time, the rules on conflicts of interest did not exist and these transactions were legal, through widely viewed as unethical and morally dishonest. The high profitability of land sales led Knox to become a leading war hawk in New York (which at the time was the U.S. capital). At the same time, the Secretary's stubborn refusal to allow for the proper organization of a federal army made the task of displacing the Indians more difficult than it otherwise would have been. Journalist and historian James Perry wrote that "even Harmar" saw the "danger" of Washington's and Knox's attempts to fight war in the Northwest on the cheap by forcing him to use independent state militiamen instead of U.S. Army troops under his direct control.

For his part, Harmar wrote: "No person can hold a more contemptible opinion of the militia in general than I do... It is lamentable... that the government is so feeble as not to afford three or four regiments of national troops properly organized that would soon settle the business with these perfidious villains upon the Wabash." One of Harmar's subordinates, Major Ebenezer Denny, called the Kentucky militia out to assist with conquering the Old Northwest "raw and unused to the gun or the woods; indeed, many are without guns". Harmar complained that the men of the Pennsylvania militia were "hardly able to bear arms - such as old, infirm men and young boys". The Pennsylvanians proved so unfit for duty that Harmar had no choice but to dismiss most of them from the army, leaving him with far fewer men than he had expected. Historian Michael S. Warner described the Kentucky and Pennsylvania militiamen as lacking "discipline, experience and in many cases even muskets".

== Campaign against the Miamis ==
In 1790, Harmar was sent on expeditions against Native Americans and the remaining British in the Northwest Territory, who continued to supply them with guns and ammunition. Furthermore, the Montreal-based North West Company had taken over the old French fur trading routes together with the services of the French-Canadian voyageurs, and thus had a vested interest in keeping the Northwest for their Indian suppliers. Knox in a letter on 7 June 1790 ordered Harmar "to extirpate, utterly, if possible, the said Indian banditti". To prevent the outbreak of further hostilities, he sent word of Harmar's campaign to Major Patrick Murray, commander of British-held Fort Detroit. The British quickly passed on this information to the local tribes and released as much gunpowder, ammunition, and firearms to them as they could.

Knox, who stood to greatly profit if the Indians were cleared out of the Northwest, seemed to have ordered the expedition in a moment of rage at the obstinate resistance of the Miami, Shawnee and Potawatomi peoples who fought his attempts to evict them; he didn't bother asking Harmar's opinion before making this decision. Knox, in his letters to Harmar, repeatedly advised him to move fast, strike hard, and avoid drinking, saying that sober generals were victorious generals. The frequency of the last warning indicated that Knox did not have much confidence in Harmar, which led Warner to question just why he was given the command in the first place given the evident doubts that both Washington and Knox had about him.

=== Preparations ===
Harmar's reputation had preceded him, because of which, many of the militiamen from Kentucky and Pennsylvania were "substitutes" (men paid to take the place of the men who were called to serve). The state militias were paid $3/day, which led Warner to note that for a typical farmer, merchant, or craftsman, this would mean neglecting his property and leaving his family and friends behind to go on a dangerous mission across the Northwestern frontier for weeks, during which time he would earn little more than $60 for his troubles. Most draftees thus paid other men to impersonate them so as to avoid duty; often, these imposters were from the lowest rung of society. Harmar was further hampered in preparations for the campaign by having only two weeks to train his Kentucky militia and only a few days to train the Pennsylvania militia before his scheduled departure on 1 October 1790.

The original plan was for Harmar to take 1,300 militiamen and 353 regulars to sack and destroy Kekionga (modern Fort Wayne, Indiana), the capital of the Miami Indians, while Major Jean François Hamtramck diverted the Miami warriors by burning down villages on the Wabash river (Hamtramck was forced to retreat early due to a lack of supplies). Before going out on his expedition, Harmar was faced with quarrels among the various militia commanders as to who was to command whom, with Colonel James Trotter and Colonel John Hardin of the Kentucky militia openly feuding with one another. Shortly before the expedition began in September 1790, Knox wrote to Harmar accusing him of drunkenness, writing he had heard rumors that "you are too apt to indulge yourself in a convivial glass" to the extent that Harmar's "self-possession" was now in doubt.

=== Campaign ===
Harmar's inept training of his forces meant that they were expected to march in formation at all times. This led to the Americans getting quickly bogged down in the dense forest, averaging less than ten miles per day. Harmar had hoped to reach Kekionga fast enough to capture the British and French-Canadian fur traders, whom he called the "real villains" for their support of the Indian tribes, but his sluggish advance precluded this. Much to Harmar's surprise, the preeminent Miami chieftain Little Turtle refused to give battle, instead retreating and burning the tribe's villages and crop fields. On 13 October 1790, a frustrated Harmar sent out a light company commanded by Hardin to continue the pursuit. Like many Americans of his time, the general considered the Indians racially inferior; he failed to see any tactical intent in their constant retreats and instead believed that they were merely cowards unwilling to face his superior forces.

After getting lost and failing to find any Indians, Hardin finally reached Kekionga on 15 October to discover the town was empty and burning. The company promptly spread out far and wide as the militiamen went looking for loot to take home with them. Harmar reached Kekionga on 17 October 1790, and wrote to President Washington that same day to boast that he had won the war without firing a shot. Harmar got his first inkling of trouble later that night, when the Miami staged a raid and stole over a hundred pack and cavalry horses, which greatly reduced the mobility of Harmar's force.

The next day, Harmar ordered Trotter to take about 300 men out to locate the stolen horses. Trotter marched into the woods, encountered one Indian riding a horse whom his party promptly shot down, and then another Indian whom they chased and killed. Afterwards, the colonel received reports from a scout that he had seen at least 50 Miami out in the woods, and he immediately ordered his men to withdraw back to camp. Hardin, who loathed Trotter, denounced him openly as a rank coward, even insulting him by claiming that he would stayed and fought the Miami if he was in Trotter's position. Denny wrote in his diary that Hardin "showed displeasure at Trotter's return without executing the orders he had received, and desired the General to give him command of the detachment".

Harmar thus sent Hardin out early the next morning, 19 October, with 180 men, including 30 U.S. Army regulars. Denny wrote in his diary: "I saw that the men moved off with great reluctance, and am satisfied that when three miles from the camp he [Hardin] had not more than two-thirds of his command; they dropped out of the ranks and returned to the camp." Hardin managed to lose one company of militia under Captain William Faulkner, which was left behind accidentally after his men stopped for a break. This led him to send Major James Fontaine and his cavalry to find them. In the meantime, Hardin stretched his column out over half a mile in the forest with 30 regulars led by Captain John Armstrong in the lead. At a meadow close to the Eel River, Hardin discovered the ground was covered with countless Miami trinkets, near what appeared to be an abandoned campfire. The militiamen immediately dispersed to start looting the site, despite warnings from Armstrong to stay in formation. Once the militiamen fell out of formation, Little Turtle, who had been watching from a hill, gave a signal to concealed Indians nearby to open fire on the Americans. Denny, who questioned the survivors, wrote in his diary: "The Indians commenced a fire at the distance of 150 yards and advanced. The greatest number of militia fled without firing a shot; the 30 regulars that were part of the detachment stood and were cut to pieces". Cut off from retreat, Armstrong and his regulars, joined by only nine militiamen, stood their ground and managed to return fire. When the Americans tried to reload, they were instantly overrun by a force of Miami, Shawnee and Potawatomi Indians armed with tomahawks.

In the ensuring battle, the Americans fought bravely, but were annihilated and cut down. Armstrong, who escaped into a swamp and feigned death, reported that "They fought and died hard". Afterwards, the bodies of the Americans slain on the field were all scalped and hacked to pieces. As the fear-stricken militiamen were running away, they ran into reinforcements led by Fontaine and Faulkner, leading one militiaman to shout: "For God's sake, retreat! You will all be killed. There are Indians enough to eat you all up!". Harmar was deeply shocked when Hardin and what was left of his force stumbled into camp to report their defeat. A furious Armstrong arrived at the camp the next day, cursing the "dastardly" behavior of the Kentucky militia and vowed never to fight with them again. Harmar, for his part, threatened to bring down cannon fire on the Kentucky militia if he should ever see them retreating back to camp in disorder again. Unknown to Harmar, the victorious Indians were already positioned near his camp, but at a war council, the decision was made to retreat and wait for Harmar to make the next move.

On 20 October, Denny wrote in his diary that: "The army all engaged burning and destroying everything that could be of use: corn, beans, pumpkins, stacks of hay, fencing and cabins, &c". Despite Hardin's defeat, Harmar was content that enough damage had been inflicted on the Indians and his mission was therefore complete. On 21 October, Harmar ordered his men to return to Fort Washington, much to the general relief of his hungry and frightened soldiers. After leaving Kekionga, Hardin suggested to Harmar that the Americans make a surprise advance to Kekionga to try and ambush the returning Miami. Hamar initially rejected this suggestion, but Hardin insisted that the "honor" of the Kentucky militia demanded such a gesture; it is likely that Hardin was more concerned with his reputation after the inglorious performance of the militiamen in the battle by the Eel River, and was seeking a personal triumph. Harmar finally agreed and in Denny's words "ordered out four hundred choice men, to be under the command of Major John Wyllys, to return to the towns, intending to surprise any parities that might be assembled there". Major Wyllys in his last letter complained: "We are about agoing forth to war in this part of the world. I expect to have not a very agreeable campaign... Tis probable the Indians will fight us in earnest, the greater part of our force will consist of militia; therefore there is some reason to apprehend trouble."

=== Harmar's Defeat ===
Harmar's force of Federal troops and militia were badly defeated by a tribal coalition led by Little Turtle in an engagement known as "Harmar's Defeat", "the Battle of the Maumee", "the Battle of Kekionga", or "the Battle of the Miami Towns". Under the sky free of clouds and a full moon, Harmar sent out 60 U.S. Army soldiers and 340 militiamen under Wyllys, with Hardin as second in command, on the evening of October 21 back to Kekionga.

The American force was divided into three, with Major Horatio Hall to lead 150 militiamen across the St. Mary's River to strike from the east, Major James McMillian attacking from the west, and Wyllys and the regulars striking frontally at Kekionga. October 22 was a warm, sunny October day and the mood among the American forces was an upbeat one. It was known that the Indians would usually avoid combat except on the most advantageous terms, with the only exception being when their women and children were in danger. Harmar and his officers believed that by attacking the Indian villages directly, Little Turtle would be forced into a pitched battle where they would have the upper hand. Warner described the concept behind the plan as sound, but noted its execution left too much unplanned; there was no co-ordination between the three wings advancing on Kekionga, and no contingency plans if the element of surprise was lost.

The militia under Hall and McMillian panicked and fired on the first Indians they ran into, alerting the Miami to the American presence. They then broke rank to pursue fleeing tribesmen down the St. Joseph's River, leaving Wyllys to lead his attack unsupported. McMillian and Hall proved unable to control their men. One officer testifying at Harmar's court-martial in 1791 stated that the militia's impulsiveness caused Indian women and children to go "flying in all directions" from Kekionga, and stated that in his opinion, Harmar should have called off the attack and retreated while he still had the chance.

Little Turtle concentrated his main force at a ford in the Maumee River, where they set an ambush. As the Americans were crossing the Maumee, a survivor of the battle, Private John Smith, later recalled that he saw "the opposite riverbank erupt in sheets of flame. Horse and riders were struck down as if by some whirlwind force." Soon, the Maumee ran red with American blood, which led Jean Baptiste Richardville, a half-French, half-Miami chief, to later remark that he could have walked against the Maumee dry-footed as the river was clogged with American bodies. Major Fontaine drew his sword and charged forward at the opposite bank, shouting "Stick with me!". The Indians simply concentrated their fire on Fontaine's charge, leaving him badly wounded. He later bled to death. Hearing the shooting, McMillian led his own men in an attempt to out-flank Little Turtle. The chief fell back towards the river, and the militia chased him as his warriors also scattered seemingly in fear.

Upon entering spread out helter-skelter in a cornfield, the Americans were astonished to hear what one veteran later recalled was a "hideous yell" as a huge number of Miami emerged from the underbrush. The Americans had only enough time to fire off one disorganized volley before they were forced to engage in desperate hand-to-hand fighting with their steel bayonets, swords and knives against the tomahawks, spears and knives of the Miami. Wyllys, along with 50 U.S. regulars and 68 militiamen, fell as a consequence of the uncoordinated attack, and their bodies were all scalped. The Indians mockingly referred to the battle site as a "pumpkin field" as the bloody heads of the Americans lying out in the open reminded them of pumpkins.

One of the survivors was Hardin, who upon reaching Harmar's camp reported that his Kentuckians had fought "charmingly" and lied that he had won a great victory. Harmar was about to march out when a different report arrived, revealing the extent of the defeat. Harmar ordered Major James Ray to find the dead Americans, but only 30 men volunteered, and he turned back after marching just three miles. The general then ordered a full retreat, leaving the fallen soldiers unburied. Little Turtle could have finished off Harmar's crippled force, which was saved only by a lunar eclipse that the Indians regarded as a bad omen. Taking out his anger on the remaining militia, Harmar forced them to march back at bayonet-point to discourage mutiny.

=== Aftermath ===
When Harmar reached Fort Washington on November 3, 1790, the public was outraged to learn of his defeat. The general sent false reports to Knox omitting the disaster, but the truth soon came out, with militiamen giving interviews to the press accusing Harmar of alcoholism, cowardice and incompetence. The fact that Harmar had never exposed himself to fire led to rumors appearing in the newspapers that he had spent the campaign drunk in his tent. When the news reached New York, President Washington wrote to a friend: "I expected little from the moment I heard he was a drunkard". Warner noted that the campaign's failure was largely due to poorly planning on the part of Washington's administration, which had stated that the aim of Harmar's efforts was to "chastise" the Indians of the Northwest by burning down their crops and homes without necessarily bringing Little Turtle to battle, through Harmar was to do so if possible; the ambiguity on this point helps to explain Harmar's confusion about what he was supposed to do.

Warner also argued that, though Harmar did not have the best troops under his command, he exacerbated the problem with his poor leadership and lack of experience. In particular, Harmar should have known that the Indians preferred using ambushes, and that Little Turtle would never fight his army on open terrain. Harmar's failure to recover the bodies of the dead was disastrous for morale, as it persuaded his men that he was both a coward and indifferent to their lives. The American dead of Kekionga were not finally buried until 1794, when the Battle of Fallen Timbers decisively ended the war.

In the national rage caused by the debacle, bashing Harmar become a favorite pastime of the newspapers, but Perry wrote that Harmar was a scapegoat, and the ultimate responsibility rested with President Washington. Perry wrote:

Harmar, in fact, became something of a scapegoat. Washington was just as culpable. He could have insisted on a more experienced, more able officer to lead the expedition. He didn't. He could have demanded the troops be trained in frontier fighting, for he, more than anyone else, knew all about that. He didn't. He could, in fact, have done his best to build a decent little army for a nasty little war. He didn't do that, either. And now he made an even bigger blunder. He named Arthur St. Clair, governor of the territory, as Harmar's replacement, with the rank of major general, and asked him to try again. Harmar was a calamity; St. Clair would be a catastrophe.

=== Court martial ===
Harmar was subsequently court-martialed at his own request, on various charges of negligence, and exonerated by a court of inquiry. During the trial, he had a run in with author and Revolutionary veteran John Robert Shaw, who wrote about the general in his autobiography John Robert Shaw: An Autobiography of Thirty Years 1777–1807.

== Later life ==
Harmar was removed from full command in March 1791, but remained in the Army until resigning on January 1, 1792. He returned to Pennsylvania, where Mifflin, by then governor, appointed him as the state's adjutant general; he served from 1793 until retiring in 1799. Harmar was popular in Philadelphia during his last years, being described as "well regarded by all who knew him, for he was of genial manner". Harmar was described as "tall and well-built, with a manly port, blue eyes, and keen martial glance. He was very bald, wore a cocked hat, and his powdered hair in a cue".

== Death and legacy ==
Harmar died in what was then near Philadelphia (but now considered South Philadelphia) at his estate, "The Retreat", near Gray's Ferry and the Schuylkill River. He is buried at the Episcopal Church of St. James Kingsessing, in West Philadelphia. His widow was the former Sarah Jenkins (1760–1848). In addition to one son and a daughter who died as children, Harmar had a daughter, Eliza Harmar Thomas (1787–1869), and sons Josiah Harmar (1802–1848); who would, in turn, have a son and grandson with the same name, but who lived in Connecticut) and William Harmar (1803–1878).

== Dates of rank ==
- Captain, Thompson's Pennsylvania Rifle Battalion - October 27, 1775
- Captain, 1st Continental Infantry Regiment - January 1, 1776
- Major, 3rd Pennsylvania Infantry Regiment - October 1, 1776
- Lieutenant Colonel, 6th Pennsylvania Infantry Regiment - June 6, 1777
- Lieutenant Colonel Commandant, 7th Pennsylvania Infantry Regiment - August 9, 1780
- Lieutenant Colonel, 3rd Pennsylvania Infantry Regiment - January 17, 1781
- Lieutenant Colonel, 1st Pennsylvania Infantry Regiment - January 1, 1783
- Brevet Colonel, Continental Army - September 30, 1783
- Discharged - November 3, 1783
- Lieutenant Colonel Commandant, First American Regiment - August 12, 1784
- Brevet Brigadier General - July 31, 1787
- Resigned - January 1, 1792

Note - General Harmar was the senior officer and commander of the United States Army from August 12, 1784, to March 4, 1791.

== Notes ==
Military offices
| Preceded by Joseph Doughty | Senior Officer of the United States Army; 1784–1791 | Succeeded by Arthur St. Clair |
