= Tacumwah =

- Born: 1720
- Died: c. 1790
- Other name: Marie-Louise Pacanne Richerdville
- Occupation: Business woman
- Spouses: Antoine Joseph de Richarville, Charles Beaubien
- Children: Jean Baptiste Richardville, Josetta Beaubien
- Relatives: Pacanne

Tacumwah (c. 1720 – c. 1790), alternate spelling "Taucumwah", aka Marie-Louise Pacanne Richerville (Richardville), was a businesswoman and prominent chieftess of the Miami tribe. She was the sister of Pacanne, a leading Miami chief, and the mother of Chief Jean Baptiste Richardville (or "Peshewa"). The name Tacumwah means "Parakeet" in the Miami language.

Tacumwah married Antoine Joseph Drouet de Richarville, the son of a French nobleman who was serving as a lieutenant in the French garrison at Fort St. Phillipe, later Fort Miamis. Richerville — who later Anglicized his name as Richardville, the form in which he passed the name to his son — later left the area and became a fur trader in Canada. Tacumwah had three other children. They were all baptised in 1773 by Father Pierre Gibault, but Tacumwah divorced Richerville a year later when he sided with Alexander and Francis Maisonville for control of the Long Portage, an 8-mile strip of land between the Maumee and Wabash Rivers that was controlled by her brother Pacanne. Richerville physically beat Tacumwah in the ensuing argument, and she took refuge with his business rival Charles Beaubien. Pacanne and Beaubien physically threatened Richerville and the Maisonville brothers, and the matter was taken to court at Fort Detroit on 18 September 1774.

== Court case ==
The case was centered around the marriage of Tacumwah and Richardville, the larger effort being to "maintain control of a large amount of capital in the form of slaves, cattle, corn and wampum, and of control of a pivotal portage that Tacumwah had inherited by virtue of her Miami lineage." For Tacumwah, the fact that she had been raised by a mother brought up in a matrilineal tradition which could have bearing in how Tacumwah carried herself. Pacanne alluded to this when he referred to his sister's possessions as belonging to her and not her husband since they had been inherited from her mother. This confirmed that Tacumwah's mother had gained valuable belongings in her own right, and her right to pass these onto her daughter was indisputable. It was decided that Pacanne would keep control of the portage, and Tacumwah would keep all her property.

== Aftermath ==
Tacumwah married Beaubien, and they had one daughter, Josetta Beaubien Roubidoux. According to custom, Josetta's eldest son should have succeeded his uncle, Chief Richardville, as a chief of the Miami, but Josetta's descendants were repudiated by the tribe and stricken from the Miami roll in 1867.

Tacumwah was a political advisor to her son Peshewa, and sometimes spoke for him in the tribal council. She reportedly once put a knife into Peshewa's hand and told him to free a white captive whom other tribesmen were about to execute.

In her later years, Tacumwah ran a successful trading post. Her son Peshewa inherited her business holdings when she died.
