= Little Turtle =

Miami chief (c.1747–1812)

Little Turtle Mihšihkinaahkwa
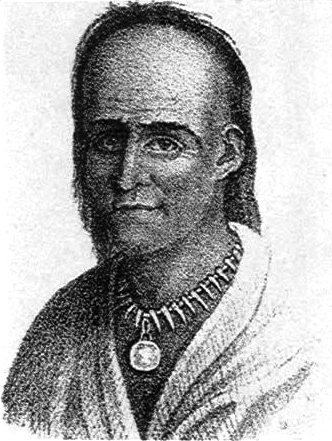
- Lithograph of Little Turtle, reputedly based upon a lost portrait by Gilbert Stuart that was destroyed when the British burned Washington, D.C., in 1813.

War chief of the Miami people

Personal details
- Born: 1747/1752 Miami territory, Illinois Country (modern Whitley County, Indiana, United States)
- Died: Fort Wayne, Indiana, United States

Military service
- Allegiance: Miami people
- Battles/wars: La Balme's Defeat; Northwest Indian Wars

Little Turtle (Miami-Illinois: Mihšihkinaahkwa) (c.1747 — July 14, 1812) was a Sagamore (chief) of the Miami people, who became one of the most famous Native American military leaders. Historian Wiley Sword calls him "perhaps the most capable Indian leader then in the Northwest Territory," although he later signed several treaties ceding land, which caused him to lose his leader status during the battles which became a prelude to the War of 1812. In the 1790s, Mihšihkinaahkwa led a confederation of native warriors to several major victories against U.S. forces in the Northwest Indian Wars, sometimes called "Little Turtle's War", particularly St. Clair's defeat in 1791, wherein the confederation defeated General Arthur St. Clair, who lost 900 men in the most decisive loss by the U.S. Army against Native American forces.

== Name ==
Little Turtle is an English translation of mihšihkinaahkwa [mih.ʃih.ki.naːh.kwa], the phonetic spelling of his name in the Miami-Illinois language. His native name in historic records includes many variations, including Michikinikwa, Meshekunnoghquoh, Michikinakoua, Michikiniqua, Me-She-Kin-No-Quah, Meshecunnaquan, and Mischecanocquah. The word names a species of terrapin, probably the Midland painted turtle. There is no diminutive on this name in the original Miami-Illinois language.

== Early life and physical description ==
There is little documentary evidence for most of Little Turtle's life. The exact year and place of his birth are uncertain. Still, sources generally indicate that he was born in 1747 or 1752, the years before or following the period that his parents lived in the Miami village of Pickawillany. Some historians give 1752 as his probable date of birth; others prefer 1747.

The exact names of Little Turtle's parents have been long debated. Historian Andrew Cayton named Mishikinakwa (The Turtle) as his father and an unnamed Mohican refugee as his mother; however, Little Turtle biographer Harvey Carter indicated that Little Turtle's father was Cinquenackqua.

Little Turtle was born in what became present-day Whitley County, Indiana, at either a small Miami village along Devil's Lake or a larger nearby village known as Turtletown (present-day Churubusco, Indiana). Little Turtle lived at Turtletown, along the Eel River, until 1780.

Little Turtle has been described as nearly six feet tall. He disdained drunkenness and presented himself as a serious man. Little Turtle was fond of wearing silver on his ears and clothing.

== Career ==
=== Early years ===
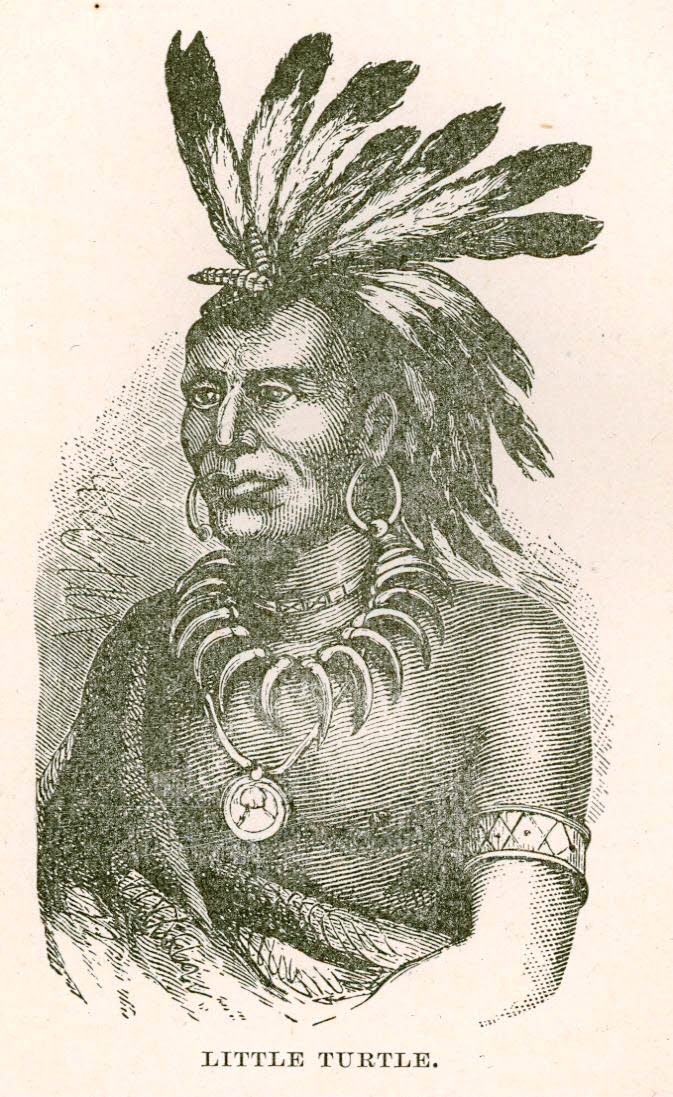
Little Turtle, from U.S. Army Military History Institute

Little Turtle was selected as the war chief of the Atchatchakangouen division of the Myaamiaki (Miami people) through his demonstration of military prowess in battle. Although he was the war chief of the leading division of the tribe, Little Turtle was never the head chief of the Miami, which was a hereditary position.

=== La Balme's Defeat ===
Little Turtle earned this designation during the American Revolutionary War in action against a French force allied with the American patriots, led by French military adventurer Augustin de La Balme. After raising a force of forty-to-fifty men at Vincennes, Indiana and a similar number along the Kaskaskia–Cahokia Trail, in October 1780 La Balme plundered Miamitown at Kekionga (present-day Fort Wayne), as part of his campaign to attack the British in Detroit. When La Balme stopped to camp along the Eel River just three miles south of Little Turtle's village, Little Turtle received permission to lead an attack. On November 5, 1780, Little Turtle attacked La Balme, killing La Balme and forty of his men and taking the rest prisoner. The battle was a complete rout, and Little Turtle's army suffered almost no casualties. Many French soldiers were heard begging to surrender while they were scalped alive. Several French officers were taken alive, three of whom were burnt at the stake, one of whom had his hands and feet cut off before being killed by having his face struck with a tomahawk, and four of whom were let go as a warning to the rest of the French. When French forces allied to the Americans attempted to scout out the location a few days later, they saw that the heads of several French soldiers blocked the path impaled on pikes. After seeing this, they turned back. These events occurred in and around what is today Columbia City, Indiana in Whitley County, Indiana. The victory ended the campaign and established Little Turtle's reputation as a war leader. Through the 1780s, Little Turtle continued to lead raids against colonial American settlements in Kentucky, fighting on the side of the British. However, the Miami bands did not uniformly support the British. The Piankashaw Miami supported the rebel Americans, while the Wea Miami vacillated between the British and Americans.

=== Little Turtle's War ===
Under the terms of the Treaty of Paris (1783), which ended the American Revolutionary War, the British abandoned their native allies and ceded the land between the Appalachian Mountains and the Mississippi River to the U.S. government. (The United States considered this region to be theirs by right of conquest.) Through the Land Ordinance of 1784 and the Northwest Ordinance of 1787, the U.S. government established Northwest Territory in 1787.

Native Americans living in the territory resisted the encroaching American settlements, and violence escalated in the area. Native tribes formed the Northwestern Confederacy to keep the Ohio River as a boundary between Indian lands and the United States. Little Turtle emerged as one of the war leaders of the Confederacy, which also included the Shawnee under Blue Jacket and the Delaware under Buckongahelas. The war with the United States that followed became known as the Northwest Indian War, also called "Little Turtle's War".

Little Turtle helped to lead Native Americans against federal forces led by General Josiah Harmar in late 1790. To end the border war with native tribes in the area, the U.S. government sent an expedition of American troops under the command of General Harmar, but his forces lacked sufficient training and were poorly supplied. (Because the United States had mostly disbanded its military after the American Revolution, it had few professional soldiers to send into battle, a weakness that Little Turtle and other native leaders fully exploited.) In October 1790, Little Turtle and Blue Jacket won two victories against Harmar's men. These successes encouraged further resistance. In addition, previously reluctant leaders among the Ottawa and Wyandot joined the confederacy.

In August 1791, Little Turtle's daughter was among the women and children who were captured in a raid of a Miami village along the Eel River led by James Wilkinson. By September 1791, a force of 1,400 to nearly 2,000 American soldiers under the command of Arthur St. Clair was moving north from Fort Washington (present-day Cincinnati, Ohio), headed toward the Maumee-Wabash portage.

=== St. Clair's defeat ===
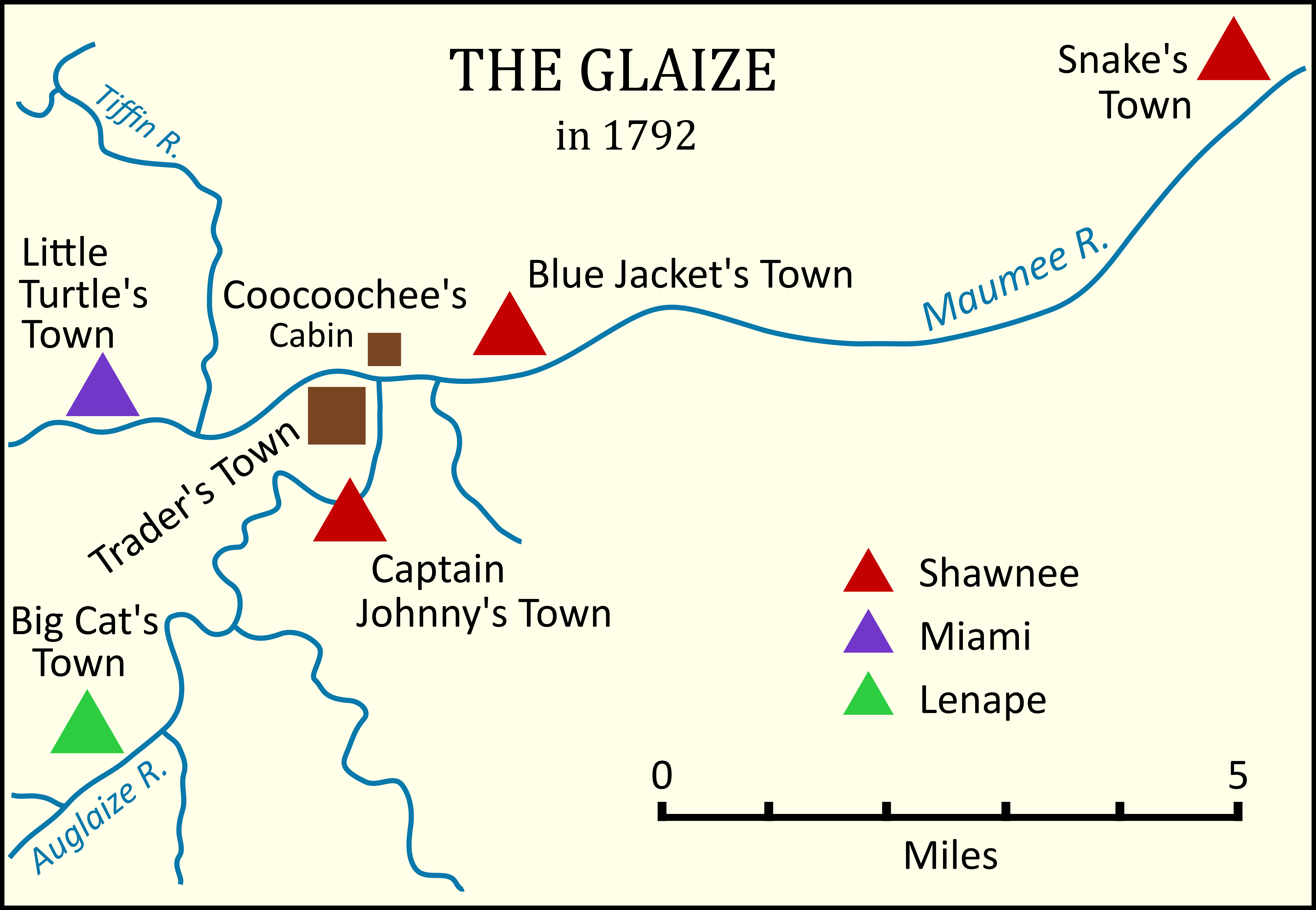
Native towns at the Glaize in 1792

Little Turtle is generally credited with leading a coalition force of about 1,000 warriors that routed the U.S. forces near the headwaters of the Wabash River on November 4, 1791. The battle remains the U.S. Army's worst defeat by American Indians, with 623 federal soldiers killed and another 258 wounded. The Indian confederacy lost an estimated 100 men. Both Little Turtle and Blue Jacket claimed overall command of the combined native forces in the victory, causing tension within the Confederacy.

In November 1792, following the decision of a grand council of tribal leaders at the mouth of the Auglaize River, Little Turtle led a force of 200 Miami and Shawnee past the U.S. outposts of Fort Jefferson and Fort St. Clair, reaching Fort Hamilton on November 3. The warriors intended to attack the U.S. settlements on the anniversary of St. Clair's Defeat. The warriors captured two prisoners and learned that a large convoy of packhorses had left for Fort Jefferson and was due back in the area within days. Little Turtle moved north and found the convoy of nearly 100 horses and 100 Kentucky militia under the command of Major John Adair encamped outside Fort St. Clair. Little Turtle and his warriors attacked at dawn on November 4, just as Adair recalled his sentries. The militia fled into the fort, suffering six killed and four missing, while another five were wounded. Little Turtle's force lost two warriors but captured Adair's camp and its provisions. All the horses were killed, wounded, or driven off; only 23 were later recovered. Adair considered the battle to be a "triumph" for Little Turtle; James Wilkinson, at that time a lieutenant colonel in command of the U.S. Army at Fort Washington, believed that the loss of the horses made these advanced forts indefensible.

Between 1792 and 1794, General Anthony Wayne commanded the Legion of the United States in a third expedition in the Northwest Territory against the Indian Confederacy. To avoid another defeat, Wayne rigorously trained 3,500 U.S. troops and carefully planned his campaign. The American forces successfully repulsed an exploratory attack on Fort Recovery with an estimated 1,000 warriors in June 1794. Afterwards, Little Turtle counseled his tribesmen to pursue negotiations and peace rather than suffering a defeat in battle, remarking that Wayne was " the chief that never sleeps."

When Little Turtle was unable to persuade the leaders of the tribal Confederacy to negotiate peace, he stepped down as the intertribal war chief. Little Turtle is said to have ceded command to Blue Jacket, although he retained leadership of his group of Miami tribesmen. Little Turtle's son-in-law, William Wells, a white man who was born in Kentucky and lived among the Miami for eight years after his capture in 1784, also sensed the defeat of the Indian alliance and switched his alliance to the Americans. Wells served as a scout for General Wayne's troops and later as an Indian Agent for the U.S. government.

=== Battle of Fallen Timbers ===
The Indian Confederacy, numbering around 1,000 warriors, was defeated at the Battle of Fallen Timbers in August 1794 near the Maumee River. After the battle, the Miamis abandoned Kekionga and relocated to other villages along the Eel, Mississinewa, and Wabash Rivers.

Following the Indian Confederacy's defeat at Fallen Timbers, their leaders signed the Treaty of Greenville (1795), a turning point in their resistance to American expansion. Little Turtle traveled with his wife to Greenville and gave a speech before signing the treaty. He encouraged his people "to adopt American ways" and hoped the treaty would improve relations between the Americans and Native Americans. His wife died in camp the next day. Her funeral and burial included American soldiers as pallbearers, American music, and a three-gun salute.

Although Indian resistance to the Americans diminished after the Treaty of Greenville was signed, Indian raids continued to threaten settlements along the frontier until 1815. For the remainder of his life, Little Turtle was a committed peacekeeper, causing some to consider him an "accommodationist" who believed that his people would have to adapt to the Americans' way of life if they hoped to endure.

== Later years ==
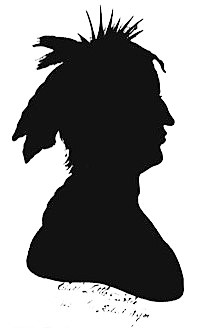
Silhouette of Little Turtle by Robert Wyer

After the defeat of the Western Confederacy at the Battle of Fallen Timbers in 1794 and signing the Treaty of Greenville in 1795, Little Turtle refused an alliance with the Shawnee chief Tecumseh. Little Turtle continued to advocate for peace and accommodation instead of conflicts. He also began to adapt to United States cultural habits, including the acquisition of his land, but remained adamant in his opposition to alcohol consumption. Little Turtle made multiple trips east to meet with three U.S. presidents, although he refused to travel with Blue Jacket. He accepted annuity payments, other rewards, and enslaved African Americans in exchange for his cooperation.

The United States more highly regarded Little Turtle than Blue Jacket. He was recommended to President George Washington by General James Wilkinson, and in November 1796, Little Turtle met with President George Washington, who presented him with a ceremonial sword. On this trip he also met Comte de Volney. One account of the trip states that on his way to Philadelphia, Pennsylvania, to meet the president, Little Turtle met General Tadeusz Kościuszko, who presented him with a matching pair of pistols along with instructions to use them on "the first man who ever comes to subjugate you." In 1797–98, during a second trip east, Little Turtle met with President John Adams.

President Thomas Jefferson also corresponded with Little Turtle to encourage the introduction of American agriculture to Miami society, although it was Moravian missionaries who demonstrate farming methods to native tribes in the White River area and an East Coast Quaker society from Baltimore, Maryland, who sent Philip Dennis to work with tribes in Fort Wayne to establish a model farm. Little Turtle also made two trips to Washington, D.C., in 1801–02 and 1809–09 to meet with President Jefferson. At Little Turtle's and other chiefs' request, Jefferson provided agricultural equipment and livestock to the Miamis and Potawatomis to encourage the tribes to adopt farming. Despite these efforts, among others, most of the attempts at assimilation failed, a contributing factor to the federal government seeking further land cession treaties and the eventual removal of the territory's Native American inhabitants from the Northwest Territory.

A lifelong teetotaler, Little Turtle made a personal plea to President Jefferson to prohibit the sale and consumption of alcohol in Native American communities. On 14 January 1802 he delivered a speech to President Thomas Jefferson and members of the US Senate:

Father, nothing can be done to advantage unless the Great Council of the Sixteen Fires, now assembled, will prohibit any person from selling spirituous liquors among their red brothers. The introduction of this poison has been prohibited in our camps but not in our towns, where many of our hunters, for this poison, dispose of, not only their furs, etc., but also their blankets and guns, and return to their families destitute...Owing to the introduction of this fatal poison, we have become less numerous and happy.

Jefferson and members of Congress were impressed with Little Turtle's arguments, and on 30 March 1802, Congress passed the revised Indian Nonintercourse Act. This and other federal laws restricting the sale of alcohol to Native Americans remained in effect until 1953.

In 1809, Little Turtle suffered a break with other Miami leaders when William Henry Harrison, governor of the Indiana Territory, came to Fort Wayne to renegotiate treaty terms. Working with Little Turtle and his son-in-law, William Wells, Harrison succeeded in obtaining the Treaty of Fort Wayne (1809), which secured 2,500,000 acres (1,000,000 hectares) of land for the federal government from the Potawatomi representatives and other tribes who cooperated. Other tribal leaders who opposed Little Turtle, including Pacanne, Jean Baptiste Richardville (Pacanne's nephew), Owl, and Metocina, refused to relinquish any more land to the U.S. government. Harrison was forced to recognize the Mississinewa chiefs as the true representatives of the Miamis, not Little Turtle, and to declare that Little Turtle was not a Miami. Although Little Turtle was among the signers of the Treaty of Fort Wayne, afterward, he was "forcibly retired from Miami affairs." Shawnee war chief Tecumseh and his brother, Tenskwatawa (The Prophet), condemned the treaty and began talks with the British about allying. That alliance was attacked by the United States at the 1811 Battle of Tippecanoe, in which William Well's brother fought for the United States while another of Little Turtle's sons-in-law, White Loon, fought for Tecumseh's Confederacy.

Little Turtle retired to a Miami village twenty miles northeast of Fort Wayne, Indiana. Following the Siege of Fort Wayne during the War of 1812, General Harrison ordered the destruction of all Miami villages within a two-day march of Fort Wayne, an order that may have been in retaliation for the negotiations in 1809. Harrison's forces also destroyed the village where Little Turtle resided, but spared Little Turtle's home, which the U.S. government had built for his use. The United States defeated the British and their Native American allies at the Battle of the Thames in 1813, destroying the power of the Native American Confederacy. As a result, many Native Americans moved farther west.

== Death and legacy ==
Little Turtle died on July 14, 1812, at the home of his son-in-law William Wells, not far from Kekionga. Little Turtle had been suffering from gout and rheumatism for some time. He was honored with a military-style funeral with full military honors at Fort Wayne. Little Turtle was buried in his ancestral burial ground near Spy Run. Wells was killed one month later at the Battle of Fort Dearborn.

In 1912, Little Turtle's grave was accidentally disturbed. His remains were disinterred when workers discovered the burial site during a cellar excavation for a home on Lawton Place in Fort Wayne. Although the plans for the house were altered and Little Turtle's remains were reinterred the objects initially placed in his grave- including the sword from President Washington, the pistols from Kosciusko, and other artifacts- were distributed to collectors and later gathered for public display. The objects were placed in the collection of the Allen County-Fort Wayne Historical Society, and were eventually displayed at the Fort Wayne Old City Hall Building.

Little Turtle's legacy was one of initial resistance and cooperation to preserve the lives and future of his people.

== Honors and tributes ==
Little Turtle Memorial
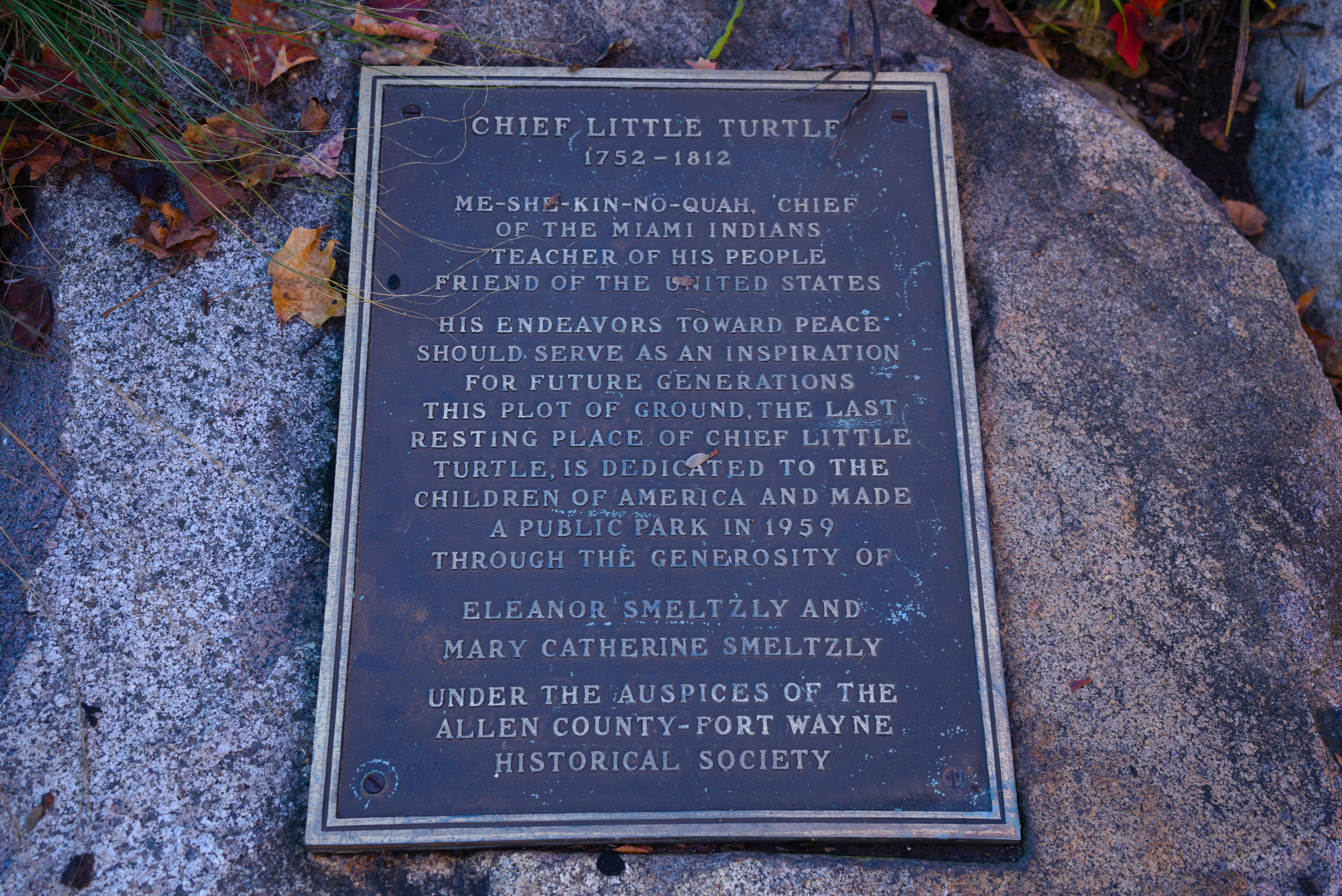
- Interactive map of Little Turtle Memorial
- Type: Municipal Park and Gravesite
- Location: 634 Lawton Place, Fort Wayne, Indiana
- Coordinates: 41°05′29″N 85°7′56.3″W
- Area: 0.13 acres (0.05 ha)
- Created: 1960
- Operator: Fort Wayne Parks and Recreation

=== Burial site ===
In 1959, Fort Wayne residents Mary Catherine Smeltzly and her sister, Eleanor Smeltzly, purchased Little Turtle's burial site to honor his peacemaking efforts by donating the property to the city as a public park. A bronze plaque attached to a granite boulder erected on the site was dedicated in 1960. In 1994, the memorial was improved with additional markers, and a trust was established for its maintenance.

A small memorial stone placed at Little Turtle's gravesite reads:

CHIEF LITTLE TURTLE

1752–1812

ME-SHE-KI-NO-QUAH CHIEF OF THE MIAMI INDIANS TEACHER OF HIS PEOPLE FRIEND OF THE UNITED STATES

HIS ENDEAVORS TOWARD PEACE SHOULD SERVE AS AN INSPIRATION FOR FUTURE GENERATIONS.

THIS PLOT OF GROUND, THE LAST RESTING PLACE OF CHIEF LITTLE TURTLE, IS DEDICATED TO THE CHILDREN OF AMERICA AND MADE A PUBLIC PARK IN 1959 THROUGH THE GENEROSITY OF

ELEANOR SMELTZLY AND MARY CATHERINE SMELTZLY

UNDER THE AUSPICES OF THE ALLEN COUNTY–FORT WAYNE HISTORICAL SOCIETY

=== Indiana sites named for Little Turtle ===
- Camp Chief Little Turtle (a Boy Scout camping facility near Ashley)
- Little Turtle Elementary School, Columbia City, Indiana.
- Little Turtle Branch of the Allen County Public Library
- Little Turtle Waterway ( plaza in Logansport )

=== Ohio sites named after Little Turtle ===
- A neighborhood that includes a private golf course in Columbus.
- A street named "Little Turtle Court" in Ross, Ross Township.
- Little Turtle, Ohio, a town founded by Roger Lippman in 1968.
- Turtle Creek in Turtlecreek Township, Warren County.

=== Other sites ===
- Lake Erie's Turtle Island, astride the Michigan and Ohio border.
- Defiance College in Defiance, OH honors Chief Little Turtle with a statue outside the Pilgrim Library.
