= Treaty at the Forks of the Wabash =

Treaty at the Forks of the Wabash may refer to:

- Treaty at the Forks of the Wabash (1834)
- Treaty at the Forks of the Wabash (1838), part of the Indian removals in Indiana
- Treaty of the Wabash, 1840

== See also ==
- Treaty of Mississinewas, also called Treaty of the Wabash, 1826
