= List of counties in Indiana =

Counties of Indiana
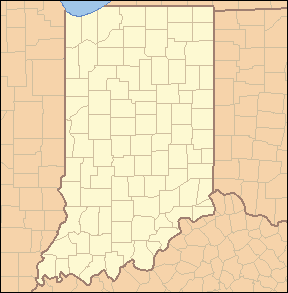
- Location: State of Indiana
- Number: 92
- Populations: 5,994 (Ohio) – 992,196 (Marion)
- Areas: 86 square miles (220 km^{2}) (Ohio) – 657 square miles (1,700 km^{2}) (Allen)
- Government: County government
- Subdivisions: 1,008 Townships

There are 92 counties in the U.S. state of Indiana. Each county serves as the local level of government within its borders. Although Indiana was organized into the United States since the Northwest Ordinance in 1787, its land was not always available for settlement. The Vincennes Tract, Clark's Grant and an area known as "The Gore" in southeastern Indiana (resulting from the Treaty of Greenville 1795) existed during the Northwest Territory. The remainder of Indiana land was acquired by Indian Removal Act and purchases by treaty between 1804 and 1840. The largest purchase (called "Delaware New Purchase" or just "New Purchase") resulted from the Treaty of St. Mary's (1818) which acquired about 1/3 of the state in the central portion. All or most of 35 counties were eventually carved from the area. The oldest counties are generally in the south near the Ohio River, whereas newer ones were in the north in territory acquired later. Many of the final counties were formed subsequent to the acquisition and break up of the Big Miami Reserve (encompassing present day Howard County and parts of surrounding counties) between 1834 and 1840. The oldest and newest counties in Indiana are Knox County, created in 1790, and Newton County, created in 1859.

As of the 2025 Census estimates, the population of Indiana was 6,973,333, the average population of Indiana's 92 counties is 75,797, with Marion County as the most populous (992,196), and Ohio County (5,994) the least. 54 counties have 30,000 or more people; 17 counties have populations exceeding 100,000, five of which exceed 250,000; and only five counties have fewer than 10,000 people. The average land area is 396 square miles (1,030 km^{2}). The largest county is Allen (657 sq. mi., 1,702 km^{2}) and the smallest is Ohio (86 sq. mi., 223 km^{2}). According to the Constitution of Indiana, no county may be created of less than 400 square miles (1,000 km^{2}), nor may any county smaller than this be further reduced in size, which precludes any new counties.

County government in Indiana consists of two bodies, the county council and the commissioners.

Many Indiana counties are named for United States Founding Fathers and personalities of the American Revolutionary War, the War of 1812 and Battle of Tippecanoe; early leaders of Indiana Territory and Indiana, as well as surrounding states like Michigan and Kentucky; plus Native American tribes and geographical features.

The Federal Information Processing Standard (FIPS) code, which is used by the United States government to uniquely identify states and counties, is provided with each entry. Indiana's code is 18, which when combined with any county code would be written as 18XXX. The FIPS code for each county links to census data for that county.

In Indiana, the most commonly seen number associated with counties is the state county code, which is a sequential number based on the alphabetical order of the county. It has been used on automobile license plates since 1963. It first held a prominent place on the left side of the plates as part of the license plate number until the year 2008 when it was moved above the serial number and 2012 when it was moved to the lower right corner. On license plates, county codes 93, 95, and 97-99 were also used for Marion County in addition to 49. 94 and 96 were used for Lake County in addition to 45. These additional numbers ceased to be used as of 2008. In addition these codes are also used by INDOT for structure IDs on objects such as bridges and overpasses.

== Counties ==
County	FIPS code	County seat	Est.	Origin	Etymology	BMV Number	Population	Area	Map
Adams County	001	Decatur	Feb 7, 1835	Adams New Purchase	U.S. President John Quincy Adams	1	36,650	339 sq mi (878 km^{2})	State map highlighting Adams County
Allen County	003	Fort Wayne	Apr 1, 1824	Delaware New Purchase	Col. John Allen, Kentucky state senator	2	402,329	657 sq mi (1,702 km^{2})	State map highlighting Allen County
Bartholomew County	005	Columbus	Feb 12, 1821	Jackson County and Delaware New Purchases	Lt. Col. Joseph Bartholomew, a hero of the Battle of Tippecanoe	3	85,729	407 sq mi (1,054 km^{2})	State map highlighting Bartholomew County
Benton County	007	Fowler	Feb 18, 1840	Jasper County	Thomas H. Benton, U.S. Senator from Missouri	4	8,883	406 sq mi (1,052 km^{2})	State map highlighting Benton County
Blackford County	009	Hartford City	Apr 2, 1838	Jay County	Judge Isaac Blackford, Speaker of the Indiana House of Representatives and Chief Justice of the Indiana Supreme Court	5	11,730	165 sq mi (427 km^{2})	State map highlighting Blackford County
Boone County	011	Lebanon	Apr 1, 1830	Adams and Wabash New Purchases	Frontiersman Daniel Boone	6	80,689	423 sq mi (1,096 km^{2})	State map highlighting Boone County
Brown County	013	Nashville	Apr 1, 1836	Bartholomew County; Jackson County; Monroe County	General Jacob Brown, hero of the War of 1812	7	15,777	312 sq mi (808 km^{2})	State map highlighting Brown County
Carroll County	015	Delphi	Apr 1, 1828	Adams and Wabash New Purchases	Charles Carroll, signer of the Declaration of Independence	8	20,655	372 sq mi (963 km^{2})	State map highlighting Carroll County
Cass County	017	Logansport	Apr 14, 1829	Non-county Area	Gen. Lewis Cass, Governor of Michigan Territory and U.S. Secretary of State	9	37,836	412 sq mi (1,067 km^{2})	State map highlighting Cass County
Clark County	019	Jeffersonville	Feb 3, 1801	Knox County	General George Rogers Clark, American Revolutionary War hero	10	130,451	373 sq mi (966 km^{2})	State map highlighting Clark County
Clay County	021	Brazil	Apr 1, 1825	Owen County; Putnam County; Sullivan County; Vigo County	U.S. Speaker of the House Henry Clay	11	26,410	358 sq mi (927 km^{2})	State map highlighting Clay County
Clinton County	023	Frankfort	Mar 1, 1830	Adams and Wabash New Purchases	DeWitt Clinton, Governor of New York	12	33,322	405 sq mi (1,049 km^{2})	State map highlighting Clinton County
Crawford County	025	English	Mar 1, 1818	Orange County; Harrison County; Perry County	Col. William Crawford, surveyor of the Midwest and hero of the Indian Wars	13	10,509	306 sq mi (793 km^{2})	State map highlighting Crawford County
Daviess County	027	Washington	Feb 15, 1817	Knox County	Col. Joseph Hamilton Daveiss, hero of the Battle of Tippecanoe	14	34,209	429 sq mi (1,111 km^{2})	State map highlighting Daviess County
Dearborn County	029	Lawrenceburg	Mar 7, 1803	Clark County, IN; Hamilton County, OH	U.S. Secretary of War Henry Dearborn	15	51,609	305 sq mi (790 km^{2})	State map highlighting Dearborn County
Decatur County	031	Greensburg	Mar 4, 1822	Delaware New Purchase	Commodore Stephen Decatur, hero of the War of 1812	16	26,576	373 sq mi (966 km^{2})	State map highlighting Decatur County
DeKalb County	033	Auburn	Feb 7, 1835	Non-county Area	Johann de Kalb, German noble who trained colonial soldiers for the American Revolutionary War	17	44,535	363 sq mi (940 km^{2})	State map highlighting DeKalb County
Delaware County	035	Muncie	Apr 1, 1827	Delaware New Purchase	Delaware Native American people	18	113,106	392 sq mi (1,015 km^{2})	State map highlighting Delaware County
Dubois County	037	Jasper	Feb 1, 1818	Perry County; Pike County	Toussaint Dubois, hero of the Battle of Tippecanoe	19	44,016	427 sq mi (1,106 km^{2})	State map highlighting Dubois County
Elkhart County	039	Goshen	Apr 1, 1830	Non-county Area	Disputed, but possibly the Elkhart Native American people	20	208,774	463 sq mi (1,199 km^{2})	State map highlighting Elkhart County
Fayette County	041	Connersville	Jan 1, 1819	Franklin Wayne County and Non-county Area	Marquis de la Fayette, French noble who trained colonial soldiers in the American Revolutionary War	21	23,533	215 sq mi (557 km^{2})	State map highlighting Fayette County
Floyd County	043	New Albany	Feb 1, 1819	Clark and Harrison Counties	Either John Floyd, a War of 1812 hero and Governor of Virginia, or early settler and state legislator Davis Floyd	22	82,153	148 sq mi (383 km^{2})	State map highlighting Floyd County
Fountain County	045	Covington	Apr 1, 1826	Montgomery County and Wabash New Purchase	Major James Fontaine, a hero of the American Revolutionary War	23	17,013	396 sq mi (1,026 km^{2})	State map highlighting Fountain County
Franklin County	047	Brookville	Jan 1, 1811	Clark County; Dearborn County; Knox County	Writer, orator, scholar, and founding father Benjamin Franklin	24	23,286	384 sq mi (995 km^{2})	State map highlighting Franklin County
Fulton County	049	Rochester	Feb 7, 1835	Non-county Area	Robert Fulton, developer of the steamboat	25	20,091	368 sq mi (953 km^{2})	State map highlighting Fulton County
Gibson County	051	Princeton	Apr 1, 1813	Knox County	John Gibson, secretary of the Indiana Territory	26	33,091	487 sq mi (1,261 km^{2})	State map highlighting Gibson County
Grant County	053	Marion	Apr 1, 1831	Madison County, New Purchase and un-organized	Captains Samuel and Moses Grant, former American soldiers and early settlers	27	66,524	414 sq mi (1,072 km^{2})	State map highlighting Grant County
Greene County	055	Bloomfield	Feb 5, 1821	Sullivan County; Non-county Area	Gen. Nathanael Greene, hero of the American Revolutionary War	28	31,165	543 sq mi (1,406 km^{2})	State map highlighting Greene County
Hamilton County	057	Noblesville	Apr 7, 1823	Delaware New Purchase	Alexander Hamilton, first Secretary of the Treasury and founding father	29	387,036	394 sq mi (1,020 km^{2})	State map highlighting Hamilton County
Hancock County	059	Greenfield	Jan 26, 1827	Madison County	John Hancock, first signer of the Declaration of Independence	30	90,969	306 sq mi (793 km^{2})	State map highlighting Hancock County
Harrison County	061	Corydon	Dec 1, 1808	Clark and Knox County	William Henry Harrison, governor of Indiana Territory and U.S. President	31	40,437	485 sq mi (1,256 km^{2})	State map highlighting Harrison County
Hendricks County	063	Danville	Apr 1, 1824	Delaware and Wabash New Purchase	Governor of Indiana William Hendricks	32	193,510	407 sq mi (1,054 km^{2})	State map highlighting Hendricks County
Henry County	065	New Castle	Jun 1, 1822	Delaware New Purchase	Patrick Henry, attorney, orator, and founding father	33	49,137	392 sq mi (1,015 km^{2})	State map highlighting Henry County
Howard County	067	Kokomo	Jan 15, 1844	un-organized	Gen. Tilghman Howard, a U.S. Representative from Indiana	34	83,904	293 sq mi (759 km^{2})	State map highlighting Howard County
Huntington County	069	Huntington	Feb 2, 1832	Adams New Purchase and un-organized	Samuel Huntington, signer the Declaration of Independence	35	37,224	383 sq mi (992 km^{2})	State map highlighting Huntington County
Jackson County	071	Brownstown	Jan 1, 1816	Clark, Jefferson and Washington	U.S. President Andrew Jackson	36	47,370	509 sq mi (1,318 km^{2})	State map highlighting Jackson County
Jasper County	073	Rensselaer	Feb 7, 1835	Wabash New Purchase	Sgt. William Jasper, hero of the American Revolutionary War	37	33,894	560 sq mi (1,450 km^{2})	State map highlighting Jasper County
Jay County	075	Portland	Feb 7, 1835	Adams New Purchase	John Jay, first Chief Justice of the United States Supreme Court	38	20,118	384 sq mi (995 km^{2})	State map highlighting Jay County
Jefferson County	077	Madison	Jan 1, 1811	Clark, Dearborn and Knox County	U.S. President Thomas Jefferson	39	33,279	361 sq mi (935 km^{2})	State map highlighting Jefferson County
Jennings County	079	Vernon	Feb 1, 1817	Jackson and Jefferson Counties	Jonathan Jennings, first Governor of Indiana	40	27,622	377 sq mi (976 km^{2})	State map highlighting Jennings County
Johnson County	081	Franklin	May 5, 1823	Delaware New Purchase	John Johnson, first Chief Justice of the Indiana Supreme Court	41	174,262	320 sq mi (829 km^{2})	State map highlighting Johnson County
Knox County	083	Vincennes	Jun 20, 1790	Original County	U.S. Secretary of War Henry Knox	42	35,652	516 sq mi (1,336 km^{2})	State map highlighting Knox County
Kosciusko County	085	Warsaw	Feb 7, 1835	un-organized	Tadeusz Kościuszko, Polish-born hero of the American Revolutionary War	43	80,892	531 sq mi (1,375 km^{2})	State map highlighting Kosciusko County
LaGrange County	087	LaGrange	Apr 1, 1832	un-organized	The ancestral estate of the Marquis de la Fayette, the French-born hero of the American Revolutionary War	44	41,305	380 sq mi (984 km^{2})	State map highlighting LaGrange County
Lake County	089	Crown Point	Feb 1, 1836	Newton and Porter Counties	Its location on Lake Michigan	45, 94, 96	504,612	499 sq mi (1,292 km^{2})	State map highlighting Lake County
LaPorte County	091	La Porte	Apr 1, 1832	St. Joseph and un-organized	Means the door in French, which refers to the city of La Porte	46	111,294	598 sq mi (1,549 km^{2})	State map highlighting LaPorte County
Lawrence County	093	Bedford	Mar 16, 1818	Orange	Capt. James Lawrence, hero of the War of 1812	47	45,568	449 sq mi (1,163 km^{2})	State map highlighting Lawrence County
Madison County	095	Anderson	Jul 1, 1823	Delaware New Purchase	U.S. President James Madison	48	135,088	452 sq mi (1,171 km^{2})	State map highlighting Madison County
Marion County	097	Indianapolis	Apr 1, 1822	Delaware New Purchase	Gen. Francis Marion, American Revolutionary War hero	49, 93, 95, 97, 98, 99	992,196	396 sq mi (1,026 km^{2})	State map highlighting Marion County
Marshall County	099	Plymouth	Feb 7, 1835	St. Joseph County	U.S. Chief Justice John Marshall	50	46,599	444 sq mi (1,150 km^{2})	State map highlighting Marshall County
Martin County	101	Shoals	Feb 1, 1820	Daviess and Dubois Counties	Major John T. Martin, hero of the War of 1812	51	9,856	336 sq mi (870 km^{2})	State map highlighting Martin County
Miami County	103	Peru	Apr 2, 1832	Cass County and un-organized	Miami Native American people	52	34,487	374 sq mi (969 km^{2})	State map highlighting Miami County
Monroe County	105	Bloomington	Apr 10, 1818	Orange County	U.S. President James Monroe	53	143,345	395 sq mi (1,023 km^{2})	State map highlighting Monroe County
Montgomery County	107	Crawfordsville	Mar 1, 1823	Wabash New Purchase	Gen. Richard Montgomery, hero of the American Revolutionary War	54	38,954	505 sq mi (1,308 km^{2})	State map highlighting Montgomery County
Morgan County	109	Martinsville	Feb 15, 1822	Delaware and Wabash New Purchase	Gen. Daniel Morgan, hero of the American Revolutionary War	55	74,967	404 sq mi (1,046 km^{2})	State map highlighting Morgan County
Newton County	111	Kentland	Feb 7, 1835	Jasper County	Sgt. John Newton, hero of the American Revolutionary War	56	14,188	402 sq mi (1,041 km^{2})	State map highlighting Newton County
Noble County	113	Albion	Jun 1, 1835	un-organized	U.S. Senator James Noble or Governor of Indiana Noah Noble, brothers	57	47,937	411 sq mi (1,064 km^{2})	State map highlighting Noble County
Ohio County	115	Rising Sun	Mar 1, 1844	Dearborn County	The Ohio River forms its east boundary	58	5,994	86 sq mi (223 km^{2})	State map highlighting Ohio County
Orange County	117	Paoli	Feb 1, 1816	Gibson, Knox and Washington	Orange County, North Carolina, in turn named for the Dutch Protestant House of Orange	59	19,834	398 sq mi (1,031 km^{2})	State map highlighting Orange County
Owen County	119	Spencer	Jan 1, 1819	Daviess and Sullivan County	Abraham Owen, hero of the Battle of Tippecanoe	60	21,886	385 sq mi (997 km^{2})	State map highlighting Owen County
Parke County	121	Rockville	Apr 2, 1821	Vigo County	Benjamin Parke, a delegate of Indiana Territory to the U.S. Congress	61	16,642	445 sq mi (1,153 km^{2})	State map highlighting Parke County
Perry County	123	Tell City	Nov 1, 1814	Gibson and Warrick Counties	Commodore Oliver Hazard Perry, hero of the War of 1812	62	19,389	382 sq mi (989 km^{2})	State map highlighting Perry County
Pike County	125	Petersburg	Feb 1, 1817	Gibson and Perry County	Zebulon M. Pike, explorer of the American West	63	12,003	334 sq mi (865 km^{2})	State map highlighting Pike County
Porter County	127	Valparaiso	Feb 7, 1835	un-organized	Capt. David Porter, hero of the War of 1812	64	176,049	418 sq mi (1,083 km^{2})	State map highlighting Porter County
Posey County	129	Mount Vernon	Nov 1, 1814	Gibson County Warrick County	Thomas Posey, governor of Indiana Territory	65	24,988	410 sq mi (1,062 km^{2})	State map highlighting Posey County
Pulaski County	131	Winamac	Feb 7, 1835	un-organized	Kazimierz Pułaski, Polish-born noble who led the colonial cavalry in the American Revolutionary War	66	12,463	434 sq mi (1,124 km^{2})	State map highlighting Pulaski County
Putnam County	133	Greencastle	Apr 1, 1822	Vigo, Owen counties	Gen. Israel Putnam, hero of the American Revolutionary War	67	37,876	481 sq mi (1,246 km^{2})	State map highlighting Putnam County
Randolph County	135	Winchester	Aug 10, 1818	Wayne County	Randolph County, North Carolina, which is named for first President of the Continental Congress Peyton Randolph	68	24,438	452 sq mi (1,171 km^{2})	State map highlighting Randolph County
Ripley County	137	Versailles	Dec 27, 1816	Dearborn and Jefferson County	Gen. Eleazer Wheelock Ripley, hero of the War of 1812	69	29,434	446 sq mi (1,155 km^{2})	State map highlighting Ripley County
Rush County	139	Rushville	Apr 1, 1822	Delaware New Purchase	Benjamin Rush, signer the Declaration of Independence	70	16,767	408 sq mi (1,057 km^{2})	State map highlighting Rush County
St. Joseph County	141	South Bend	Apr 1, 1830	un-organized	St. Joseph River, which flows through it toward Lake Michigan	71	272,861	458 sq mi (1,186 km^{2})	State map highlighting St. Joseph County
Scott County	143	Scottsburg	Feb 1, 1820	Clark, Jefferson, Jennings and Washington Counties	Charles Scott, Governor of Kentucky	72	25,053	190 sq mi (492 km^{2})	State map highlighting Scott County
Shelby County	145	Shelbyville	Apr 1, 1822	Delaware New Purchase	Gen. Isaac Shelby, Governor of Kentucky	73	45,882	411 sq mi (1,064 km^{2})	State map highlighting Shelby County
Spencer County	147	Rockport	Feb 1, 1818	Perry and Warrick Counties	Capt. Spier Spencer, hero of the Battle of Tippecanoe	74	20,061	397 sq mi (1,028 km^{2})	State map highlighting Spencer County
Starke County	149	Knox	Feb 7, 1835	St. Joseph County and un-organized	Gen. John Stark, hero of the American Revolutionary War	75	23,425	309 sq mi (800 km^{2})	State map highlighting Starke County
Steuben County	151	Angola	Feb 7, 1835	un-organized	Baron Frederick von Steuben, Prussian-born noble who trained colonial soldiers during the American Revolutionary War	76	34,799	309 sq mi (800 km^{2})	State map highlighting Steuben County
Sullivan County	153	Sullivan	Jan 15, 1817	Knox	General Daniel Sullivan, American Revolutionary War hero	77	20,831	447 sq mi (1,158 km^{2})	State map highlighting Sullivan County
Switzerland County	155	Vevay	Oct 1, 1814	Dearborn and Jefferson County	The home country of many of the early settlers, Switzerland	78	10,037	221 sq mi (572 km^{2})	State map highlighting Switzerland County
Tippecanoe County	157	Lafayette	Mar 1, 1826	Wabash New Purchase and un-organized	The Tippecanoe River and the Battle of Tippecanoe	79	190,456	500 sq mi (1,295 km^{2})	State map highlighting Tippecanoe County
Tipton County	159	Tipton	Jan 15, 1844	Adams New Purchase and un-organized	John Tipton, U.S. Senator	80	15,319	261 sq mi (676 km^{2})	State map highlighting Tipton County
Union County	161	Liberty	Feb 1, 1821	Parts of Fayette, Franklin and Wayne counties	Named because it united sections of three adjacent counties into one new entity	81	6,863	161 sq mi (417 km^{2})	State map highlighting Union County
Vanderburgh County	163	Evansville	Feb 1, 1818	Gibson, Posey, and Warrick Counties	Henry Vanderburgh, a judge for Indiana Territory	82	181,995	233 sq mi (603 km^{2})	State map highlighting Vanderburgh County
Vermillion County	165	Newport	Feb 1, 1824	Parke County and Wabash New Purchase	The Vermillion River	83	15,488	257 sq mi (666 km^{2})	State map highlighting Vermillion County
Vigo County	167	Terre Haute	Feb 15, 1818	Sullivan County	Francis Vigo, Italian-born colonial spy during the American Revolutionary War	84	106,512	403 sq mi (1,044 km^{2})	State map highlighting Vigo County
Wabash County	169	Wabash	Feb 2, 1832	Adams New Purchase and un-organized	The Wabash River	85	30,713	412 sq mi (1,067 km^{2})	State map highlighting Wabash County
Warren County	171	Williamsport	Mar 1, 1827	Wabash New Purchase and un-organized	Joseph Warren, American Revolutionary War hero	86	8,474	365 sq mi (945 km^{2})	State map highlighting Warren County
Warrick County	173	Boonville	Apr 1, 1813	Gibson and Knox Counties	Capt. Jacob Warrick, hero of the Battle of Tippecanoe	87	66,803	385 sq mi (997 km^{2})	State map highlighting Warrick County
Washington County	175	Salem	Jan 17, 1814	Clark, Harrison and Knox Counties	U.S. President George Washington	88	28,383	514 sq mi (1,331 km^{2})	State map highlighting Washington County
Wayne County	177	Richmond	Jan 1, 1811	Clark, Dearborn and Knox	Gen. "Mad" Anthony Wayne, hero of the American Revolutionary War	89	66,169	402 sq mi (1,041 km^{2})	State map highlighting Wayne County
Wells County	179	Bluffton	Feb 7, 1835	Adams New Purchase	Capt. William A. Wells a hero in the War of 1812	90	28,883	368 sq mi (953 km^{2})	State map highlighting Wells County
White County	181	Monticello	Apr 1, 1834	Wabash New Purchase and un-organized	Capt. Isaac White, hero of the Battle of Tippecanoe	91	25,164	505 sq mi (1,308 km^{2})	State map highlighting White County
Whitley County	183	Columbia City	Feb 7, 1835	un-organized	Col. William Whitley, hero of the Battle of Tippecanoe	92	35,046	336 sq mi (870 km^{2})	State map highlighting Whitley County

== Racial / ethnic profile (2020 census) ==
Racial / ethnic profile of counties in Indiana (2020 census)
Following is a table of counties in Indiana by race/ethnicity. The majority racial/ethnic group is coded per the key below.

Majority minority with no dominant group
Majority White
Majority Black
Majority Hispanic
Majority Asian

Racial and ethnic composition of counties in Indiana (2020 Census) (NH = Non-Hispanic) Note: the US Census treats Hispanic/Latino as an ethnic category. This table excludes Latinos from the racial categories and assigns them to a separate category. Hispanics/Latinos may be of any race.
County	Location of County	Total Population	White alone (NH)	%	Black or African American alone (NH)	%	Native American or Alaska Native alone (NH)	%	Asian alone (NH)	%	Pacific Islander alone (NH)	%	Other race alone (NH)	%	Mixed race or Multiracial (NH)	%	Hispanic or Latino (any race)	%
Adams		35,809	33,080	92.38%	171	0.48%	80	0.22%	135	0.38%	4	0.01%	50	0.14%	652	1.82%	1,637	4.57%
Allen		385,410	270,149	70.09%	43,629	11.32%	883	0.23%	18,191	4.72%	138	0.04%	1,940	0.50%	17,557	4.56%	32,923	8.54%
Bartholomew		82,208	64,395	78.33%	1,768	2.15%	132	0.16%	5,383	6.55%	45	0.05%	290	0.35%	2,938	3.57%	7,257	8.83%
Benton		8,719	7,789	89.33%	44	0.50%	15	0.17%	13	0.15%	7	0.08%	28	0.32%	194	2.22%	629	7.21%
Blackford		12,112	11,278	93.11%	54	0.45%	38	0.31%	24	0.20%	0	0.00%	30	0.25%	436	3.60%	252	2.08%
Boone		70,812	61,135	86.33%	1,426	2.01%	128	0.18%	2,389	3.37%	19	0.03%	241	0.34%	2,699	3.81%	2,775	3.92%
Brown		15,475	14,463	93.46%	55	0.36%	30	0.19%	65	0.42%	5	0.03%	48	0.31%	539	3.48%	270	1.74%
Carroll		20,306	18,727	92.22%	128	0.63%	33	0.16%	48	0.24%	0	0.00%	57	0.28%	490	2.41%	823	4.05%
Cass		37,870	28,744	75.90%	560	1.48%	109	0.29%	573	1.51%	8	0.02%	76	0.20%	1,125	2.97%	6,675	17.63%
Clark		121,093	95,403	78.79%	9,265	7.65%	249	0.21%	1,305	1.08%	127	0.10%	491	0.41%	6,362	5.25%	7,891	6.52%
Clay		26,466	24,880	94.01%	129	0.49%	43	0.16%	91	0.34%	6	0.02%	47	0.18%	810	3.06%	460	1.74%
Clinton		33,190	25,808	77.76%	196	0.59%	62	0.19%	70	0.21%	13	0.04%	46	0.14%	853	2.57%	6,142	18.51%
Crawford		10,526	9,989	94.90%	26	0.25%	23	0.22%	17	0.16%	1	0.01%	8	0.08%	341	3.24%	121	1.15%
Daviess		33,381	29,708	88.99%	619	1.85%	38	0.11%	132	0.40%	8	0.02%	76	0.23%	697	2.09%	2,103	6.30%
Dearborn		50,679	47,319	93.37%	292	0.58%	66	0.13%	211	0.42%	9	0.02%	162	0.32%	1,896	3.74%	724	1.43%
Decatur		26,472	24,769	93.57%	90	0.34%	35	0.13%	154	0.58%	8	0.03%	39	0.15%	763	2.88%	614	2.32%
DeKalb		43,265	40,232	92.99%	183	0.42%	67	0.15%	225	0.52%	39	0.09%	79	0.18%	1,255	2.90%	1,185	2.74%
Delaware		111,903	93,333	83.41%	8,141	7.27%	218	0.19%	1,388	1.24%	58	0.05%	417	0.37%	4,815	4.30%	3,533	3.16%
Dubois		43,637	38,137	87.40%	190	0.44%	55	0.13%	247	0.57%	5	0.01%	89	0.20%	768	1.76%	4,146	9.50%
Elkhart		207,047	145,039	70.05%	11,051	5.34%	373	0.18%	2,236	1.08%	54	0.03%	716	0.35%	7,984	3.86%	39,594	19.12%
Fayette		23,398	22,014	94.09%	275	1.18%	32	0.14%	58	0.25%	2	0.01%	48	0.21%	696	2.97%	273	1.17%
Floyd		80,484	67,970	84.45%	4,276	5.31%	169	0.21%	973	1.21%	21	0.03%	246	0.31%	3,747	4.66%	3,082	3.83%
Fountain		16,479	15,349	93.14%	56	0.34%	38	0.23%	43	0.26%	6	0.04%	23	0.14%	552	3.35%	412	2.50%
Franklin		22,785	21,790	95.63%	23	0.10%	25	0.11%	91	0.40%	1	0.00%	32	0.14%	604	2.65%	219	0.96%
Fulton		20,480	18,452	90.10%	141	0.69%	64	0.31%	76	0.37%	0	0.00%	43	0.21%	636	3.11%	1,068	5.21%
Gibson		33,011	30,159	91.36%	637	1.93%	61	0.18%	214	0.65%	16	0.05%	115	0.35%	1,129	3.42%	680	2.06%
Grant		66,674	54,500	81.74%	4,566	6.85%	157	0.24%	524	0.79%	22	0.03%	240	0.36%	3,253	4.88%	3,412	5.12%
Greene		30,803	29,035	94.26%	53	0.17%	68	0.22%	104	0.34%	4	0.01%	51	0.17%	937	3.04%	551	1.79%
Hamilton		347,467	275,185	79.20%	14,674	4.22%	402	0.12%	23,459	6.75%	134	0.04%	1,483	0.43%	14,024	4.04%	18,106	5.21%
Hancock		79,840	71,106	89.06%	2,346	2.94%	121	0.15%	734	0.92%	42	0.05%	219	0.27%	3,070	3.84%	2,202	2.76%
Harrison		39,654	36,702	92.56%	185	0.47%	92	0.23%	189	0.48%	17	0.04%	107	0.27%	1,434	3.62%	928	2.34%
Hendricks		174,788	139,374	79.74%	13,350	7.64%	264	0.15%	5,667	3.24%	66	0.04%	729	0.42%	7,282	4.17%	8,056	4.61%
Henry		48,914	45,105	92.21%	1,066	2.18%	67	0.14%	197	0.40%	5	0.01%	106	0.22%	1,391	2.84%	977	2.00%
Howard		83,658	68,470	81.84%	6,416	7.67%	209	0.25%	1,027	1.23%	19	0.02%	306	0.37%	4,151	4.96%	3,060	3.66%
Huntington		36,662	33,874	92.40%	221	0.60%	140	0.38%	163	0.44%	7	0.02%	83	0.23%	1,124	3.07%	1,050	2.86%
Jackson		46,428	37,815	81.45%	485	1.04%	68	0.15%	469	1.01%	5	0.01%	94	0.20%	1,241	2.67%	6,251	13.46%
Jasper		32,918	29,084	88.35%	129	0.39%	53	0.16%	90	0.27%	10	0.03%	43	0.13%	1,167	3.55%	2,342	7.11%
Jay		20,478	18,892	92.25%	53	0.26%	24	0.12%	64	0.31%	12	0.06%	26	0.13%	463	2.26%	944	4.61%
Jefferson		33,147	30,023	90.58%	510	1.54%	79	0.24%	290	0.87%	10	0.03%	106	0.32%	1,018	3.07%	1,111	3.35%
Jennings		27,613	25,665	92.94%	175	0.63%	39	0.14%	49	0.18%	2	0.01%	44	0.16%	780	2.82%	859	3.11%
Johnson		161,765	136,748	84.53%	3,850	2.38%	280	0.17%	7,420	4.59%	69	0.04%	623	0.39%	6,381	3.94%	6,394	3.95%
Knox		36,282	33,027	91.03%	696	1.92%	67	0.18%	283	0.78%	13	0.04%	104	0.29%	1,087	3.00%	1,005	2.77%
Kosciusko		80,240	67,990	84.73%	682	0.85%	160	0.20%	1,336	1.66%	16	0.02%	205	0.26%	2,359	2.94%	7,492	9.34%
LaGrange		40,446	37,834	93.54%	92	0.23%	50	0.12%	74	0.18%	1	0.00%	33	0.08%	629	1.56%	1,733	4.28%
Lake		498,700	251,106	50.35%	121,048	24.27%	691	0.14%	7,334	1.47%	95	0.02%	1,682	0.34%	16,817	3.37%	99,927	20.04%
LaPorte		112,417	85,957	76.46%	11,874	10.56%	250	0.22%	743	0.66%	18	0.02%	467	0.42%	5,123	4.56%	7,985	7.10%
Lawrence		45,011	42,224	93.81%	191	0.42%	131	0.29%	207	0.46%	4	0.01%	93	0.21%	1,396	3.10%	765	1.70%
Madison		130,129	106,928	82.17%	10,116	7.77%	259	0.20%	649	0.50%	42	0.03%	483	0.37%	5,389	4.14%	6,263	4.81%
Marion		977,203	493,665	50.52%	265,659	27.19%	1,752	0.18%	39,827	4.08%	374	0.04%	5,373	0.55%	41,267	4.22%	129,286	13.23%
Marshall		46,095	38,910	84.41%	204	0.44%	63	0.14%	274	0.59%	7	0.02%	112	0.24%	1,274	2.76%	5,251	11.39%
Martin		9,812	9,335	95.14%	20	0.20%	20	0.20%	33	0.34%	6	0.06%	11	0.11%	295	3.01%	92	0.94%
Miami		35,962	31,123	86.54%	1,792	4.98%	281	0.78%	130	0.36%	4	0.01%	102	0.28%	1,344	3.74%	1,186	3.30%
Monroe		139,718	112,490	80.51%	5,016	3.59%	222	0.16%	8,350	5.98%	37	0.03%	538	0.39%	6,707	4.80%	6,358	4.55%
Montgomery		37,936	33,748	88.96%	343	0.90%	73	0.19%	236	0.62%	13	0.03%	77	0.20%	1,165	3.07%	2,281	6.01%
Morgan		71,780	66,972	93.30%	339	0.47%	195	0.27%	276	0.38%	11	0.02%	178	0.25%	2,535	3.53%	1,274	1.77%
Newton		13,830	12,053	87.15%	42	0.30%	25	0.18%	34	0.25%	2	0.01%	34	0.25%	601	4.35%	1,039	7.51%
Noble		47,457	40,235	84.78%	217	0.46%	71	0.15%	223	0.47%	1	0.00%	104	0.22%	1,356	2.86%	5,250	11.06%
Ohio		5,940	5,629	94.76%	16	0.27%	4	0.07%	29	0.49%	0	0.00%	16	0.27%	167	2.81%	79	1.33%
Orange		19,867	18,527	93.26%	200	1.01%	37	0.19%	60	0.30%	11	0.06%	34	0.17%	693	3.49%	305	1.53%
Owen		21,321	19,874	93.21%	79	0.37%	47	0.22%	62	0.29%	0	0.00%	50	0.23%	912	4.28%	297	1.39%
Parke		16,156	15,329	94.88%	198	1.23%	55	0.34%	30	0.19%	0	0.00%	12	0.07%	307	1.90%	225	1.39%
Perry		19,170	17,853	93.13%	397	2.07%	33	0.17%	99	0.52%	3	0.02%	46	0.24%	519	2.71%	220	1.15%
Pike		12,250	11,666	95.23%	31	0.25%	39	0.32%	15	0.12%	0	0.00%	11	0.09%	308	2.51%	180	1.47%
Porter		173,215	136,993	79.09%	7,246	4.18%	259	0.15%	2,197	1.27%	51	0.03%	602	0.35%	6,963	4.02%	18,904	10.91%
Posey		25,222	23,640	93.73%	211	0.84%	44	0.17%	107	0.42%	3	0.01%	57	0.23%	785	3.11%	375	1.49%
Pulaski		12,514	11,442	91.43%	65	0.52%	24	0.19%	44	0.35%	3	0.02%	14	0.11%	464	3.71%	458	3.66%
Putnam		36,726	33,150	90.26%	1,024	2.79%	70	0.19%	355	0.97%	14	0.04%	126	0.34%	1,203	3.28%	784	2.13%
Randolph		24,502	22,325	91.12%	119	0.49%	52	0.21%	67	0.27%	0	0.00%	60	0.24%	723	2.95%	1,156	4.72%
Ripley		28,995	27,213	93.85%	73	0.25%	45	0.16%	183	0.63%	0	0.00%	53	0.18%	887	3.06%	541	1.87%
Rush		16,752	15,876	94.77%	90	0.54%	19	0.11%	54	0.32%	3	0.02%	36	0.21%	422	2.52%	252	1.50%
St. Joseph		272,912	188,556	69.09%	35,420	12.98%	773	0.28%	6,586	2.41%	159	0.06%	1,350	0.49%	13,492	4.94%	26,576	9.74%
Scott		24,384	22,829	93.62%	92	0.38%	27	0.11%	87	0.36%	11	0.05%	44	0.18%	759	3.11%	535	2.19%
Shelby		45,055	40,305	89.46%	537	1.19%	60	0.13%	339	0.75%	3	0.01%	127	0.28%	1,307	2.90%	2,377	5.28%
Spencer		19,810	18,368	92.72%	129	0.65%	44	0.22%	73	0.37%	1	0.01%	28	0.14%	491	2.48%	676	3.41%
Starke		23,371	21,395	91.55%	67	0.29%	60	0.26%	40	0.17%	4	0.02%	41	0.18%	862	3.69%	902	3.86%
Steuben		34,435	31,438	91.30%	234	0.68%	64	0.19%	187	0.54%	2	0.01%	94	0.27%	989	2.87%	1,427	4.14%
Sullivan		20,817	18,856	90.58%	877	4.21%	43	0.21%	33	0.16%	8	0.04%	28	0.13%	638	3.06%	334	1.60%
Switzerland		9,737	9,262	95.12%	14	0.14%	26	0.27%	20	0.21%	0	0.00%	11	0.11%	290	2.98%	114	1.17%
Tippecanoe		186,251	131,465	70.59%	11,080	5.95%	346	0.19%	13,613	7.31%	38	0.02%	791	0.42%	10,271	5.51%	18,647	10.01%
Tipton		15,359	14,367	93.54%	46	0.30%	13	0.08%	46	0.30%	2	0.01%	56	0.36%	395	2.57%	434	2.83%
Union		7,087	6,765	95.46%	21	0.30%	22	0.31%	33	0.47%	8	0.11%	12	0.17%	152	2.15%	74	1.04%
Vanderburgh		180,136	143,444	79.63%	17,459	9.69%	331	0.18%	2,411	1.34%	677	0.38%	709	0.39%	8,792	4.88%	6,313	3.50%
Vermillion		15,439	14,692	95.16%	37	0.24%	27	0.17%	46	0.30%	11	0.07%	18	0.12%	440	2.85%	168	1.09%
Vigo		106,153	88,137	83.03%	7,079	6.67%	311	0.29%	2,003	1.89%	25	0.02%	616	0.58%	4,743	4.47%	3,239	3.05%
Wabash		30,976	28,634	92.44%	158	0.51%	126	0.41%	161	0.52%	9	0.03%	66	0.21%	925	2.99%	897	2.90%
Warren		8,440	8,018	95.00%	7	0.08%	7	0.08%	26	0.31%	0	0.00%	11	0.13%	178	2.11%	193	2.29%
Warrick		63,898	57,346	89.75%	1,038	1.62%	92	0.14%	1,639	2.57%	11	0.02%	183	0.29%	2,206	3.45%	1,383	2.16%
Washington		28,182	26,600	94.39%	113	0.40%	66	0.23%	95	0.34%	10	0.04%	67	0.24%	831	2.95%	400	1.42%
Wayne		66,553	56,689	85.18%	3,027	4.55%	142	0.21%	707	1.06%	12	0.02%	330	0.50%	3,151	4.73%	2,495	3.75%
Wells		28,180	26,000	92.26%	220	0.78%	50	0.18%	130	0.46%	5	0.02%	40	0.14%	716	2.54%	1,019	3.62%
White		24,688	21,203	85.88%	111	0.45%	50	0.20%	94	0.38%	6	0.02%	29	0.12%	742	3.01%	2,453	9.94%
Whitley		34,191	31,832	93.10%	150	0.44%	91	0.27%	173	0.51%	3	0.01%	78	0.23%	1,023	2.99%	841	2.46%

== See also ==
- List of cities in Indiana
- List of former United States counties § Indiana
- List of Indiana townships
- Vehicle registration plates of Indiana
