= Richardville House =

Historic house in Indiana, United States

- Chief Jean-Baptiste de Richardville House
- U.S. National Register of Historic Places
- U.S. National Historic Landmark
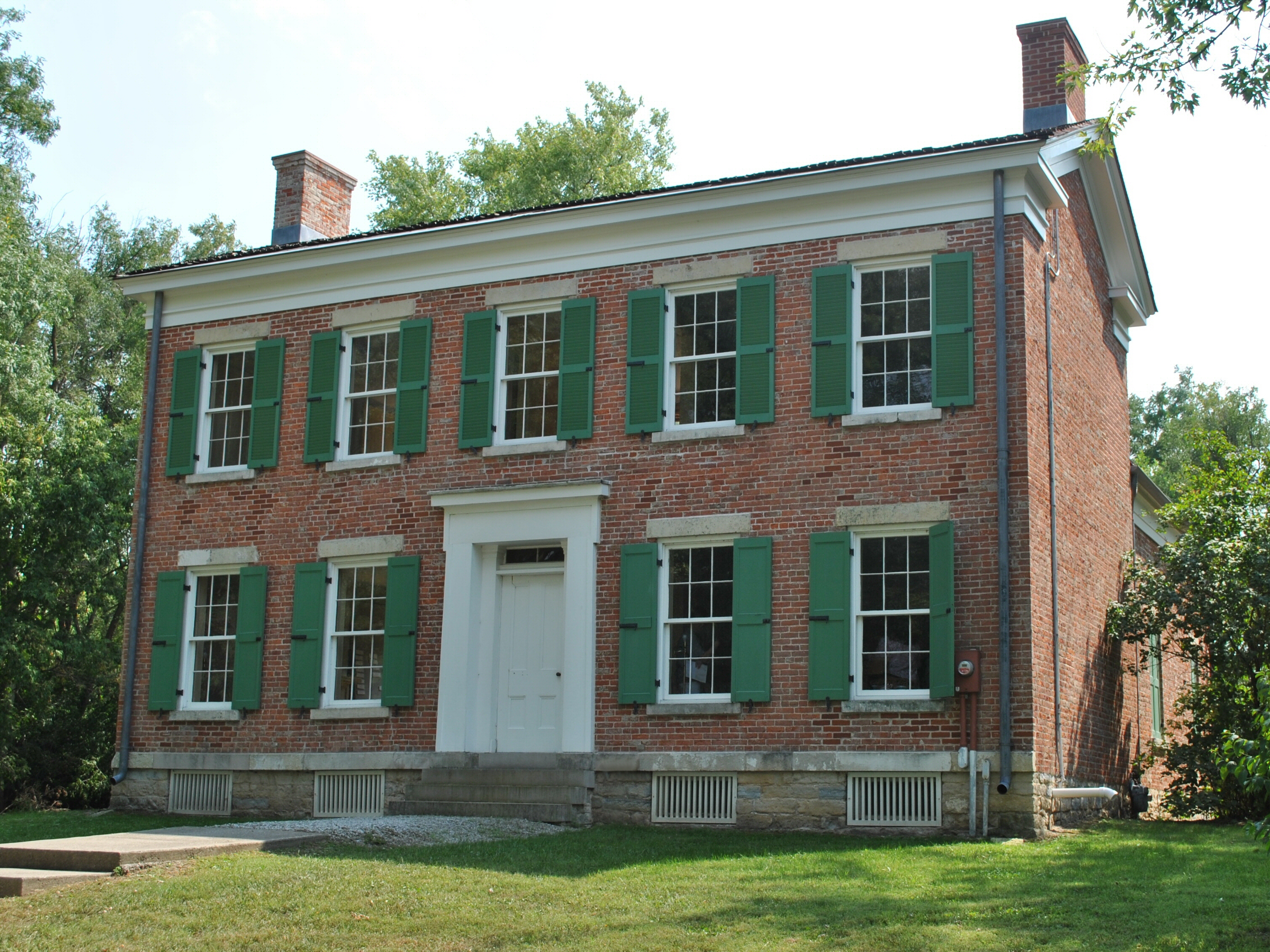
- Front of the house

- Location within Indiana Location within the United States
- Location: 5705 Bluffton Road, Fort Wayne, Indiana
- Coordinates: 41°1′53″N 85°9′52″W
- Area: 0.8 acres (0.32 ha)
- Built: 1827
- Architect: Hugh Hann; A. G. Ballard
- Architectural style: Mid-nineteenth-century revival, I-house
- NRHP reference No.: 97000595

Significant dates
- Added to NRHP: June 27, 1997
- Designated NHL: March 2, 2012

The Chief Jean Baptiste de Richardville House was built near Fort Wayne, Indiana, in 1827. Subsidized by the U.S. federal government through the 1826 Treaty of Mississinewas, it is believed to be one of only three treaty houses built east of the Mississippi River. It was designated a National Historic Landmark on March 2, 2012.

== History ==
Chief Richardville, the principal chief of the Miami from 1812 until his death in 1841, signed several treaties with the United States government as it negotiated with the Miami tribe for its eventual removal from Indiana as a recognized nation. Lands were reserved for Richardville's personal use, and $600 was provided for the building of a home.

The Richardville House's architecture reflects both Greek Revival and Federal styles. When completed, using both the government's and his own funds, Richardville's Fort Wayne home was the equal in style and grandeur of the homes of prominent white residents of the area at that time. The Allen County-Fort Wayne Historical Society acquired the house in 1991 with money donated by the Foellinger Foundation and the Ropchan Foundation.

Farther south and west lies the trading and meeting place where the Wabash River and the Wabash and Erie Canal intersected in Huntington, Indiana. Here is another home owned by Richardville (lived in by Chief LaFontaine)– a white, two-story Greek Revival filled with period furniture and portraits of the owners. This is also the site where treaties were signed. Today, this house forms the centerpiece of the historic Forks of the Wabash park.

== See also ==
- List of archaeological sites on the National Register of Historic Places in Indiana
- List of National Historic Landmarks in Indiana
- National Register of Historic Places listings in Allen County, Indiana
