= Treaty at the Forks of the Wabash (1834) =

Treaty at the forks of the Wabash between the US and the Miami tribe

The Treaty at the Forks of the Wabash (1834) also called Treaty with the Miami and Treaty of the Wabash was a Treaty between representatives of the United States and the Miami tribe and others living in the Big Miami Reserve of north central Indiana. The treaty was signed on Oct 24, 1834. The accord contained nine articles. In the accord, the Miami Tribe agreed to cede certain land to the U.S. Government and the United States agreed to pay the Miami $208,000, grant land to certain Miami people, and provide a miller to run a mill for the Miami People's use. Also included is the stipulation that the U.S. agrees to pay fifteen hundred dollars to the tribe for horses stolen from the tribe.

The 1834 treaty was the first of 4 treaties to acquire land in the Reserve. After 1840, all land previously held by Indians in the state of Indiana was now held by the government, except for a single small reserve, the Meshingomesia Reserve along the Mississinewa River, and some individual allotments.

== See also ==
- Indian removals in Indiana#Removals#Miami
- Treaty of the Wabash 1840
