= Miami Nation of Indiana =

Non-profit organization

Regions with significant populations
- United States Indiana

Languages
- English, historically Miami-Illinois and French

Religion
- Christianity, native religion

Related ethnic groups
- Peoria, Illinois, Shawnee and other Algonquian peoples

The Miami Nation of Indiana (also known as the Miami Nation of Indians of the State of Indiana) is the tribal government of the Miami Indians who legally remained in Indiana after removal in the 1840s. The group's headquarters are at Peru, Indiana.

The Indiana Miami, or Eastern Miami, signed a treaty with the United States on June 5, 1854; however, its federal recognition was terminated in 1897. The United States Congress has consistently refused to authorize federal recognition of the Indiana Miami as a tribal group separate from the Western Miami, the Miami Tribe of Oklahoma.

== Organization ==
In 1846, when some of the Miami people living in Indiana were forcefully removed to reservation lands west of the Mississippi River, the tribe split into two groups. The eastern group became known as the Miami Nation of Indians of the State of Indiana; the western group became the Miami Tribe of Oklahoma. The United States government has recognized the western group's tribal government since 1846. The Indiana Miami were recognized by the federal government as a tribal group in a treaty made on June 5, 1854; however, its federal recognition was terminated in 1897. The divide between the two groups continues to exist. Subsequent migration between the two areas has made it difficult to track tribal affiliations and further complicated the Miami's history and governing authority.

On September 30, 1937, the Miami Nation of Indians of the State of Indiana was established as a 501(c)(3) nonprofit charitable organization in Indiana. The Indiana Miami's tribal organization and government, headquarters at Peru, Indiana, are independent from the western tribe, but it lacks federal recognition as a separate tribal group. The eastern group has an elected government that is led by an executive committee. Brian J. Buchanan is the Chief of the Miami Nation of Indians of the State of Indiana. Tribal enrollment is based on lineal descent, and applicants must be biologically connected to a current tribal member or to someone listed on the tribal rolls from 1854, 1889, or 1895.

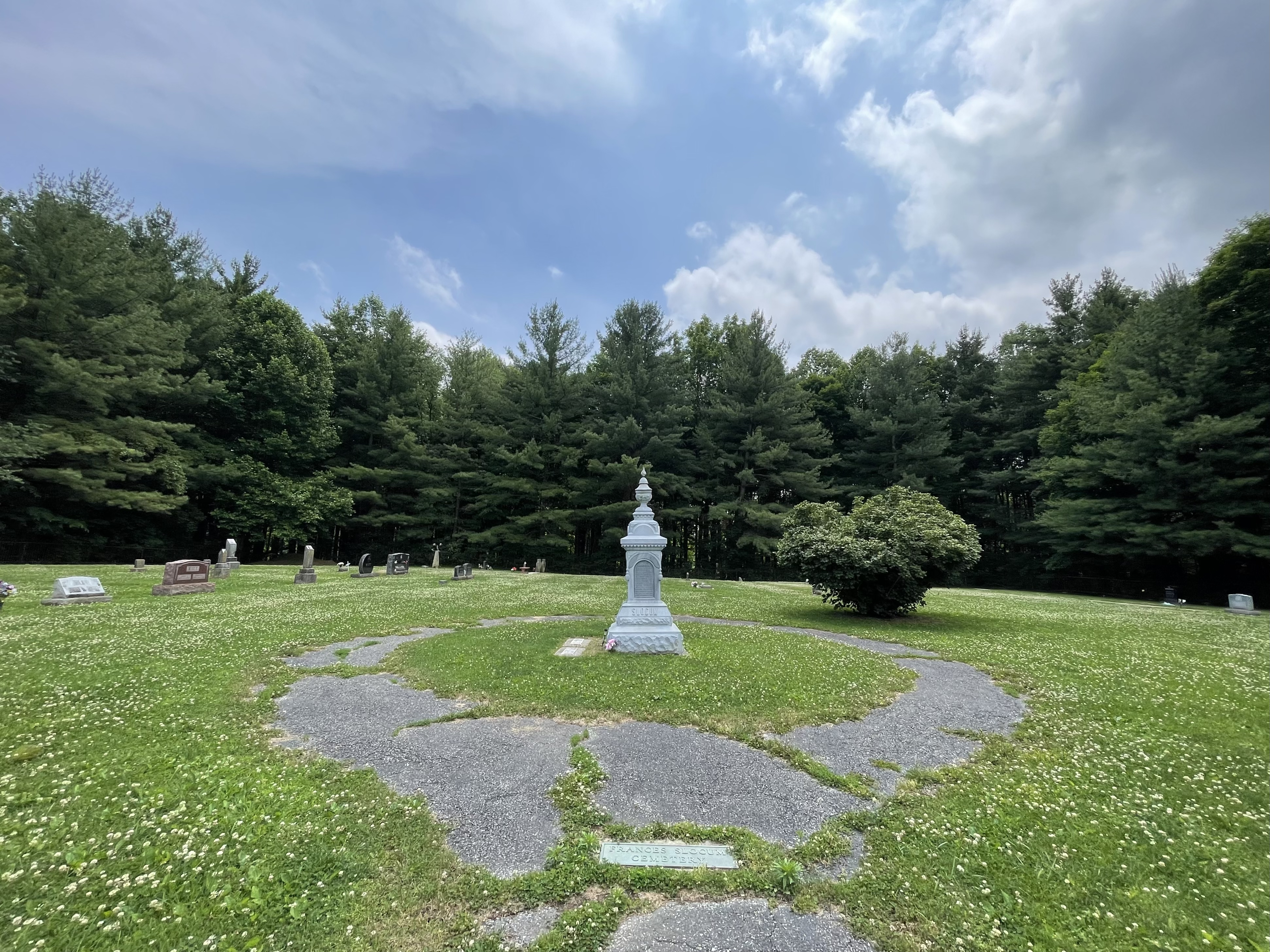
Frances Slocum Cemetery in Wabash, Indiana. Generations of Miami Nation of Indians of the State of Indiana are buried at this site.

The Miami Tribe of Oklahoma, a federally recognized tribe with headquarters in Miami, Oklahoma, has an estimated membership of 4,800; about 500 of them live in Indiana. In January 2015 the Miami Tribe of Oklahoma announced its intention to open a cultural resources extension office in May 2015 in Fort Wayne, Indiana, to provide historic preservation consulting services and cultural programming to serve its members in Indiana.

== History ==
=== Origins (1818–1846) ===
Treaties made with the Miami between 1818 and 1840 ceded tribal lands in Indiana to the federal government; however, provisions were made to allow some Miami families to remain in the state. After the Miami removed to reservations in the Kansas Territory in 1846, the Indiana Miami began efforts to assert their rights as a separate tribal group, which they achieved under a treaty made in 1854; however, their status as a federally recognized tribe was terminated in legal rulings made in 1897. Since that time, the Indiana Miami have continued legal efforts to reinstate their status as a federally recognized tribal group.

The Treaty of St. Mary's (1818), a series of agreements with the Miami and other tribes, relinquished Indian land in central Indiana and Ohio to the federal government, but a parcel of land in northern Indiana was reserved for tribal use. The treaty also allotted portions of the Miami reservation lands in Indiana to individual members of the tribe, a move that would protect many of them from removal in 1846. In 1826 the Miami people signed the Treaty of Mississinewas and agreed to cede to the United States government most of their reservation lands in Indiana, including the land ceded under the Treaty of St. Mary's (1818). As part of the compensation provided under the Treaty of Mississinewas, twenty land grants were given to the families of Chief Jean Baptiste Richardville and other Miami families, although the tribe had formerly held the land in common. The rest of the tribe was granted hunting rights on open land that became the property of the United States, but most of this land was soon parceled out to settlers.

Treaty agreement between the federal government and the Miami from 1828 to 1840 ceded the Miami's tribal reservation land in Indiana and began preparations for the tribe's removal. Under the treaties made with the Miami, individuals and families who received allotments of land in Indiana were allowed to stay. The remainder of the tribe removed to reservations west of the Mississippi River, first to Kansas Territory in 1846, then to Indian Territory, now a part of present-day Oklahoma, in 1871. In all, less than one half of the Miami tribe removed, and more than one half of the tribe either returned to Indiana or were exempt from removal under the terms of the treaties.

=== Separation from the Western Miami (1846–54) ===
The original members of the Indiana Miami date to October 6, 1846, when the major removal of the Miami began at Peru, Indiana. Individual land allotments granted under federal treaty agreement exempted 126 Miami from removal, including 43 members of Jean Baptiste Richardville's family and 28 members of Francis Godfroy's family. The remaining 55 individuals were family members of Metocinyah. In 1845 the Congress passed a resolution that allowed 22 descendants of Frances Slocum and her husband, Shapoconah (Deaf Man), to remain in Indiana. The 148 individuals in these family groups became the nucleus of the present-day Miami Nation of Indiana.

Additional names were added to the Indiana Miami's tribal rolls in the 1840s and 1850s. In 1847 a total of 17 members of the Eel River band of the Miami were added to the eastern Miami list and allowed to remain in Indiana; 101 more names were added to the group's tribal rolls in 1850. In all, about 250 Miami were living on an estimated 5,000 acres of Indiana reservation lands, most of it in Miami, Wabash, Grant, and Allen counties, by mid-century. In 1852 Congress bypassed the Indiana Miami's tribal government to add 68 names to the tribe's annuity rolls. These included more of Chief Richardville's relatives and the followers of Papakeechi (Flat Belly), another Miami leader, but neither of the two groups had lived with the Indiana Miami or participated in their community activities.

After the Miami removal in 1846, the federal government considered the Miami tribal government in the Kansas Territory as the tribe's sole governing body, and closed the Miami agency offices in Fort Wayne, Indiana. Shortly thereafter, the Miami leadership living in Indiana, began efforts to assert their group's tribal status as separate from the western Miami. As a federally recognized tribe, the Miami were exempt from federal removal from their lands; their treaty lands could not be sold without the U.S. president's permission; and their lands were exempted from taxation. Tribal members were not considered U.S. citizens and could not become citizens without congressional approval.

A treaty made on June 5, 1854, identified the eastern Miami in Indiana as a tribal government that was separate from the western Miami in the Kansas Territory, gave the two groups the authority to negotiate separate treaties, and confirmed the Indiana Miami's rights to determine their own tribal membership. The treaty also restricted annuity payments to individuals listed on tribal rolls approved by the Miami tribal council, and replaced annuity payments under previous treaties with a new annuity fund for Miami tribal members. Interest from the new fund was used to make annuity payments to the Miami until 1881, when the remaining funds were equally divided among the tribal members. Despite these treaty agreements, Congress authorized the addition of 119 more names to the Indiana Miami's tribal lists in 1858 and 1862, which made these individuals eligible for a share of the Miami annuity payments without the prior approval of the Miami tribal council. On September 20, 1867, United States Attorney General Henry Stanbery affirmed the status of the Indiana Miami's tribal government and allowed the tribe to remove the names of some of the unauthorized Miami from their tribal membership rolls.

=== Late 19th century ===
In 1872, Congress passed legislation to allow the Miami reservation near Peru, Indiana, to be allotted into individual farms. The 5,468 acres of land was divided among 63 eligible Miami into allotments of 77 to 125 acres. This Indiana land was exempt from taxation, mortgage, and subsequent sale until January 7, 1881, when the individual owners would become U.S. citizens and could dispose of the land if they chose to do so. In 1891 Gabriel Godfroy, the son of Francis Godfroy, sold his 220-acre farm at Peru to Benjamin Wallace, and the farm became the center of the winter headquarters for several traveling circuses. In addition to farming, many of the Miami found work in the Peru area on the railroads and tending the circus animals and farms.

The late 1890s marked a period of significant change in the status of the eastern tribe. In 1895 the Indiana Miami settled legal claims for the annuities paid to some of the unauthorized Miami from 1851 to 1867 that amounted to $48,528. In 1896 the Indiana Miami established "The Tribe of Miami Indians of Indiana," who successfully filed legal claims to collect an estimated $80,715 in interest on the annuities paid to the ineligible Miami. That same year the Indiana Miami from the Peru area also began legal action to have state taxes that had been imposed on their Indiana lands returned to them. The group argued that they were a federally recognized tribal group, not U.S. citizens, and were not subject to state taxation. Assistant U.S. Attorney General Willis Van Devanter disagreed. On November 23, 1897, he ruled that the Indiana Miami had not been recognized as a tribal group since 1881, when the annuity fund established under the treaty of 1854 was fully distributed. From Van Devanter's point of view, the payments made in 1881 ended the Indiana Miami's tribal relations and gave its members U.S. citizenship and individual control of their Indiana land. Because the Indiana Miami were no longer recognized as a tribal group, which meant the loss of the federal treaty benefits, the federal government was unwilling to assist them in their claim against the state of Indiana. Between 1909 and 1911 the Indiana Miami continued their efforts to gain federal tribal recognition, but were unsuccessful. A bill authorizing their federal tribal status passed the U.S. Senate, but the U.S. House of Representatives failed to pass the legislation.

=== 20th–21st centuries ===
After passage of the Indian Reorganization Act (1934) the eastern Miami renewed efforts to seek federal tribal recognition. On September 30, 1937, the Indiana secretary of state approved a tribal organization named the "Miami Nation of Indians of the State of Indiana." However, Congress consistently refused to authorize federal recognition for the Indiana Miami every year from 1938 until 1942, when the tribal council temporarily suspended their lobbying efforts during World War II. The group resumed activities after the war. In 1966 and 1969 the Indiana Miami were awarded additional settlements for land cession treaties made between 1809 and 1818 that amounted to a total of $2,500 paid to each of the 3,066 members enrolled on its tribal registers.

In 1980 the Indiana legislature, who recognized the eastern Miami, voted to support federal recognition. In July 1984, the Indiana Miami filed a formal petition for federal recognition with the Bureau of Indian Affairs; however, on July 12, 1990, they were informed the group did not meet two of the seven criteria needed to achieve federal recognition: "sufficient evidence of governance" and "evidence of a distinctive community." Additional documentation was provided to substantiate the petition, but the Bureau of Indian Affairs confirmed the determination against federal recognition for the tribe on June 9, 1992. Subsequent legal efforts failed to reverse the decision.

In 1991, Indiana's US senator, Richard Lugar, introduced a Senate resolution (S.R. 538) to recognize the Indiana Miami at the federal level, but he withdrew support due to constituent concerns over gambling rights. Under the Indian Gaming Regulatory Act (1988) Native Americans were allowed to establish casinos on their lands in states that allowed Class III gambling. Federal recognition of the Indiana Miami would allow the tribe to establish casino gambling in Indiana; however, the Indiana legislature debated and rejected casino gambling in the state in the late 1980s and early 1990s. Federally recognized tribes in other states have established gambling casinos and related facilities on their sovereign lands.

On July 26, 1993, federal judge Robert Miller ruled that the federal government recognized the Indiana Miami in the 1854 treaty and did not have the authority to terminate status in 1897. He also ruled that the statute of limitations had expired to appeal their status, which triggered a series of further rulings on the case. But in 1996, the Miami Tribe of Oklahoma changed its constitution to permit any descendant of people on certain historical rolls to join, and since then hundreds of Indiana-based Miami have become members. Today the Oklahoma Miami tribe numbers over 7,000 citizens. However many other Indiana-based Miami still consider themselves a separate group that has been unfairly denied separate federal recognition. The Supreme Court of the United States refused to review the tribe's appeal in 2002. The Miami Nation of Indiana does not have federal tribal recognition, but the state legislature introduced Senate Bill No. 311 in 2011 to formally grant state recognition to the tribe, with the sole authority to determine its tribal membership. The bill did not advance to a vote.

The Meshingomesia Cemetery and Indian School Historic District in Pleasant Township, Grant County, Indiana, was listed on the National Register of Historic Places in 2013.

== See also ==
- List of organizations that self-identify as Native American tribes
- Frances Slocum
