= Francis La Fontaine =

Chief of the Miami Tribe

- Toohpia

Miami leader
- Preceded by: Jean Baptiste Richardville

Chief

Personal details
- Born: c. 1810
- Died: 1847 Lafayette, Indiana, US
- Resting place: Huntington, Indiana
- Spouse: Catherine Richardville
- Children: Esther, Frances, Archangel, Louis, John, Joe, Tom

Francis La Fontaine, or Toohpia (Miami: "frost on leaves") (c. 1810 – 1847) was the last principal chief of the unified Miami tribe, and oversaw the split into the Western and Eastern Miami tribes.

La Fontaine's grandfather, Peter LaFontaine, was a French trader from Fort Detroit who came to Kekionga in 1776. He arrived with Charles Beaubien, and both men married Miami women and declared their loyalty to the Miami. In 1828, at age 18, La Fontaine became the chief of his Miami village. The same year, he married Catherine, the daughter of Chief Jean Baptiste Richardville. Richardville and La Fontaine worked together on a treaty in 1840 which removed half of the Miami nation to an area west of the Mississippi River.

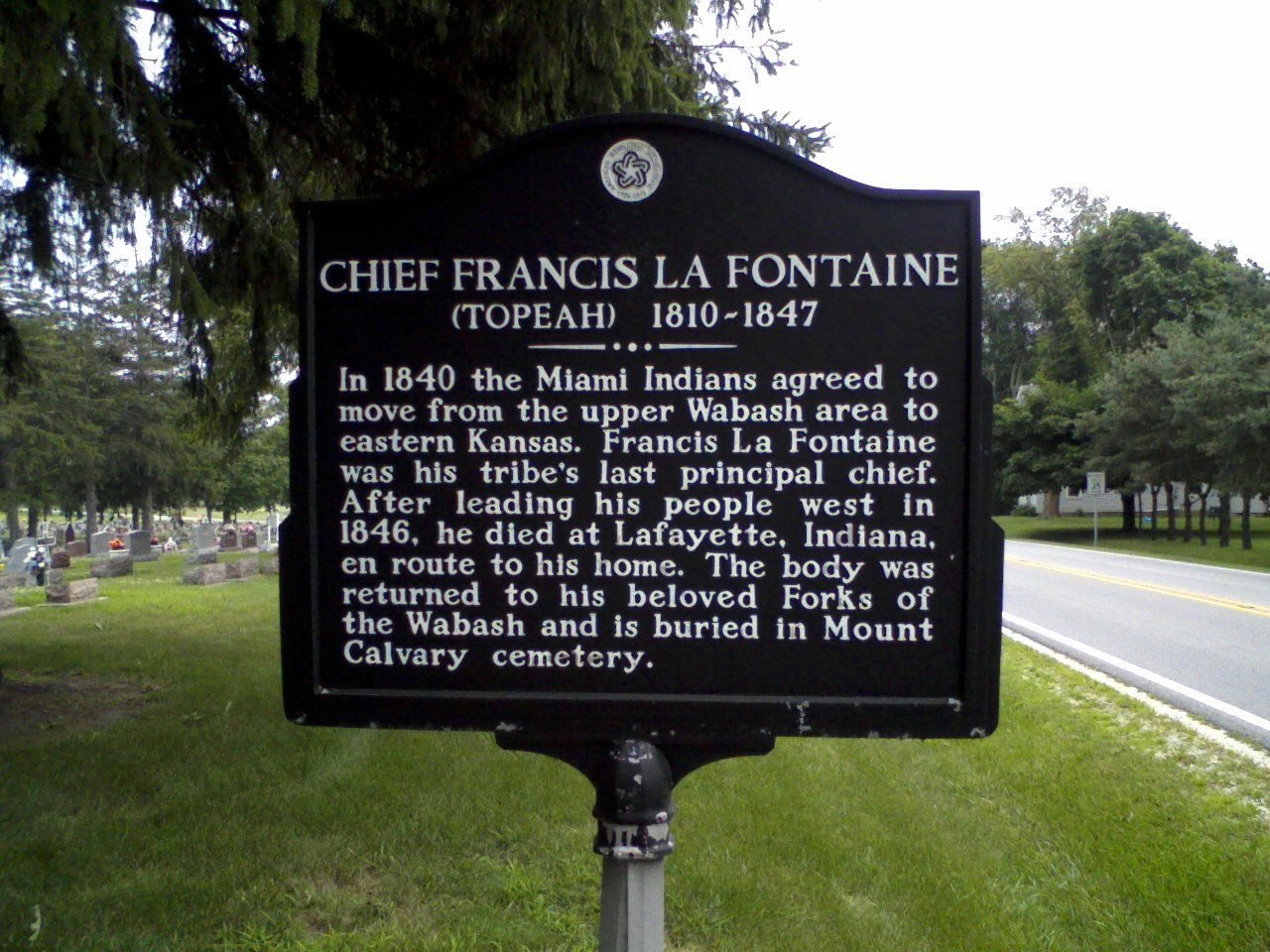
This historic marker is on Indiana State Road 5

Chief Richardville died in 1841, and Chief La Fontaine became the new principal chief of the Miami. He moved his family into Richardville's house at The Forks Of The Wabash, which doubled as the tribal headquarters.

In 1846, the Miami nation was forcibly split. Although the terms of the treaty allowed La Fontaine to stay in Indiana with the Eastern tribe, he first travelled with the Western tribe to Kansas. On his return trip, he died in Lafayette, Indiana. Speculation exists that he may have been poisoned by a member of the Western Miami tribe who viewed La Fontaine with suspicion. La Fontaine's body was returned to the Forks of the Wabash, and his remains lie in Mt. Calvary Cemetery near Huntington, Indiana.

Catherine La Fontaine died two years later. Francis and Catherine had seven children: Esther (married John Zahn), Frances (married George Gawn), Archangel (married Chris Engleman), Louis, John, Joe, and Tom. The youngest of the children were placed in the care of the Roman Catholic Church, and the sons were educated at the University of Notre Dame as payment for a mortgage Francis had granted the school to keep it financially stable. The family maintained ownership of the house until 1941, and it is currently maintained by Historic Forks of the Wabash, Inc.

== Images ==
- A digital image of La Fontain[e] (from a tintype in paper frame,) is available through the George Winter Collection at the Tippecanoe County Historical Association.
- Images at Allen County / Fort Wayne Historical Society

== Notes ==
- Allison, Harold (1986). The Tragic Saga of the Indiana Indians. Graphic Design of Indiana. Paducah: Turner Publishing Company. ISBN 0-938021-07-9.
- Federal Writers' Project. Indiana: A Guide to the Hoosier State 3rd edition, 1947. ISBN 1-60354-013-X
- Poinsatte, Charles (1976). Outpost in the Wilderness: Fort Wayne, 1706-1828. Allen County, Fort Wayne Historical Society.
