= Jean Baptiste Richardville =

Chief of the Miami people

Jean Baptiste de Richardville
- (Pinšiwa or Peshewa)
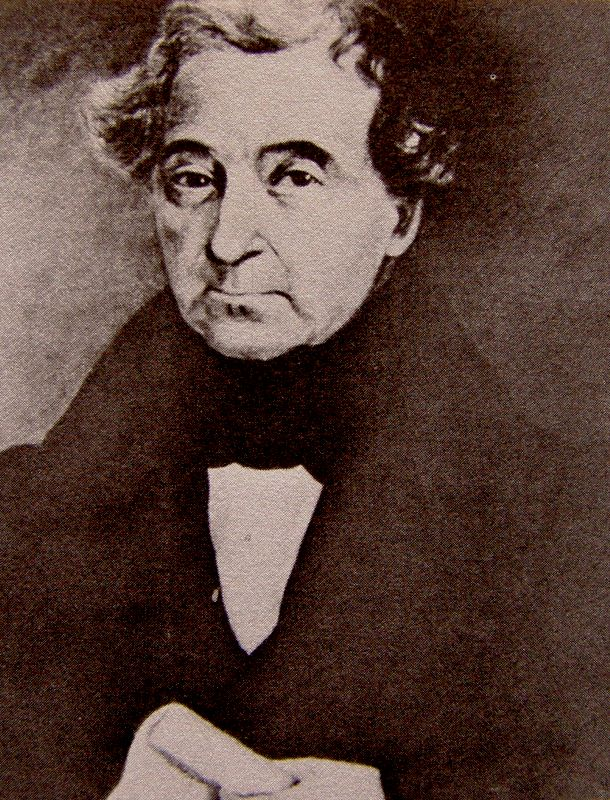

Miami leader
- Preceded by: Pacanne
- Succeeded by: Francis La Fontaine

Chief

Personal details
- Born: c. 1761 Kekionga (present-day Fort Wayne, Indiana, United States)
- Died: August 13, 1841 Fort Wayne, Allen County, Indiana
- Resting place: Fort Wayne, Allen County, Indiana
- Spouse: Natoequah
- Children: Joseph, John Baptist Jr., Miaqueah, Maria Louise, Catherine (Pocongoquah), Susan
- Parent(s): Tacumwah, Antoine-Joseph Drouet de Richerdville
- Mother tongue: Miami-Illinois language

Jean Baptiste de Richardville (c. 1761 – 13 August 1841), also known as Pinšiwa or Peshewa in the Miami-Illinois language (meaning 'Wildcat' or 'Lynx') or John Richardville in English, was the last akima 'civil chief' of the Miami people. He began his career in the 1790s as a fur trader who controlled an important portage connecting the Maumee River to the Little River (the present-day Little Wabash River) in what became the present-day state of Indiana. Richardville emerged a principal chief in 1816 and remained a leader of the Miamis until his death in 1841. He was a signatory to the Treaty of Greenville (1795), as well as several later treaties between the U.S. government and the Miami people, most notably the Treaty of Fort Wayne (1803), the Treaty of Fort Wayne (1809), the Treaty of Saint Mary's (1818), the Treaty of Mississinewas (1826), the treaty signed at the Forks of the Wabash (1838), and the Treaty of the Wabash (1840).

Richardville and other Miami leaders were criticized for personally benefitting from their roles as tribal chiefs and treaty negotiators. However, their efforts successfully delayed for decades the removal of the Miami people to federal lands west of the Mississippi River and gained additional time to negotiate concessions and obtain the best prices available for Miami lands. Treaty provisions that they negotiated also allowed about half of the Miami people, including 43 members of Richardville's family, to remain in Indiana after the remainder of the Miamis moved west in 1846. Richardville also provided displaced Miamis in Indiana with a place to stay on the few hundred remaining acres of his property. Those who remained in Indiana were among the original 148 members of the Miami Nation of Indiana, which began on October 6, 1846. Over the years, some of Richardville's family members migrated to what became the present-day states of Kansas and Oklahoma, but many more of his descendants remained in Indiana.

For his role as a civil chief of the Miamis and a treaty negotiator, the U.S. government granted Richardville a total of 28,320 acres (11,460 hectares) of land in Indiana under the terms of various treaties, as well as $31,800 in cash settlements. In addition, construction was completed in 1827 on a two-story brick residence that was partially funded by the U.S. government for Richardville and his family in Fort Wayne, Indiana, under the terms of the Treaty of Mississinewas. (The Greek Revival-style home, known as Richardville House, was designated as a National Historic Landmark in 2012.) Some accounts of Richardville's life have claimed that he was once the wealthiest Native American in Indiana. Although Richardville maintained Richardville House as his primary residence and owned another property near the Saint Marys River in Indiana, most of his land eventually went to his associates.

== Marriage and family ==
Around 1800 Richardville married Natoequah (or Natoequeah), a Miami woman. The couple had at least six children. Their three sons were Joseph, John Baptist Jr., and Miaqueah. Their three daughters were Maria Louise (called LaBlonde), Catherine (Pocongoquah), and Susan. Catherine Richardville married Francis La Fontaine. After Richardville's death in 1841, La Fontaine succeeded his father-in-law as chief of the Miamis.

== Early life and education ==
Jean Baptiste de Richardville (Peshewa or Pinšiwa, meaning 'Wildcat' or 'Lynx' in the Miami-Illinois language) was born about 1761 in the Miami (Myaami) village of Kekionga (Miamitown), present-day Fort Wayne, Indiana. He was the métis (half French and half Miami) son of Tacumwah, an influential Miami chieftess of the Atchatchakangouen band and the sister of the Miami chief Pacanne, and Antoine-Joseph Drouet de Richerville, a French-Canadian fur trader at Kekionga from about 1750 to 1770. By the late 1780s, Antoine-Joseph de Richerville had permanently settled at Trois-Rivières (Three Rivers) in Quebec, Canada. Historian Donald Chaput described the Drouets as "one of the most significant families of officers-traders in the western Great Lakes region." Through his mother's family, Jean Baptiste de Richardville was also the nephew of two Miami chiefs, Little Turtle and Pacanne.

Richardville spent part of his childhood with his father in Quebec, where he received a few years of formal education before returning to Kekionga in late 1770s to live among the Miamis with his mother. During his youth, Richardville learned to speak fluent Miami (an Algonquian language), as well as French and English. By the time that Richardville returned to Kekionga, his mother, Tacumwah, had married Charles Beaubein, a French trader in the area. Tacumwah operated her own trading house at Kekionga, where her son learned to become successful a trader. Richardville also joined his mother's tribal community. Richardville was at Kekionga when it was attacked in the 1790 Harmar campaign, and he was among the warriors who ambushed the United States in the climactic battle on 22 October.

Richardville was initially reluctant to take part in Miami tribal affairs, preferring instead to culturally identify himself as a creole Frenchman, dress in French clothing, and take an interest in European culture. Because his tribe had a matrilineal power system, Richardville gained leadership status in the tribe from his mother's people, meaning he gained authority through his mother's brother, Chief Pacanne. Richardville became more politically active in Miami affairs as an ally of his uncles, Chief Pacanne and Chief Little Turtle. After the War of 1812, Richardville began to culturally identify more with the Miami people, instead of the creole French, and became a "prominent leader of the tribe." As an adult, Richardville refused to speak English or French languages or wear European-style clothing.

== Fur trader and entrepreneur ==
Richardville began his career as a trader and operated a successful trading post at Kekionga (Miamitown) near Fort Miami, present-day Fort Wayne, Indiana, while his mother ran a trading post at the Forks of the Wabash. These two outposts along the Maumee River and Wabash Rivers dominated trade between the two waterways, which connected the Great Lakes to the Mississippi River Valley. Richardville and his mother made most of their income from the fur trade, but they also established a profitable business charging fees to transport goods over and control of a portage connecting the Maumee River to the Little River (known in the present-day as the Little Wabash River).

Under the terms of Article 4 of the Northwest Ordinance (1787), the U.S. Congress declared that all navigable waters and portages between the Mississippi and the Saint Lawrence Rivers were free for all to use. Although the Miamis lost control of the portage in the Treaty of Greenville (1795), Richardville acquired a trade license in 1815 that gave him a monopoly on carry-over services at the portage, which earned him considerable profits from the trading traffic. In 1824 Richardville had gained sufficient wealth to be among the first to purchase a lot in Fort Wayne, Indiana, that would serve as a site for his home and trading post. By 1831 he had relocated the Miami tribal headquarters and his trading post in Fort Wayne to a site at the Forks of the Wabash, which was closer to the Miami villages and tribal reserve lands.

== Tribal leader and landowner ==
Beginning in the late 1790s, Richardville took an increasingly active interest in Miami affairs and remained an influential leader of the Miami people until his death in 1841. Richardville was involved in treaty negotiations with the U.S. government, as well as the decisions on disbursement of federal funds and annuity goods given to the Miamis. Historians R. David Edmunds, Elizabeth Glenn, and Stewart Rafert have pointed out that Richardville and other Miami leaders such as Francis Godfroy personally profited from their roles as tribal chiefs and treaty negotiators, but the leaders also slowed progress in discussions regarding land cessions and removal of the Miamis from Indiana, especially between 1818 and 1840. These delays gave Richardson and the other tribal leaders additional time to negotiate concessions and delay the eventual removal of the Miami people to lands west of the Mississippi River.

=== Treaty of Greenville, 1795 ===
After the Native American defeat at the Battle of Fallen Timbers (1794), Richardville favored a negotiated peace agreement. He was one of three Miami signatories at the Treaty of Greenville (1795). This treaty established the boundaries of American Indian lands in the Northwest Territory and recognized Indian rights to land they occupied. It also set aside land for forts and trading posts, as well as specifying that the U.S. government was the only authorized party who could purchase American Indian lands.

=== Treaty of Fort Wayne, 1803 and 1809 ===
In the early 1800s, Richardville's political influence increased due to his close association with his uncle, Chief Little Turtle. In an effort to protect the Miami people's interests by cooperating with the U.S. government, Richardville signed treaties with federal officials in 1802 and 1803. The Treaty of Fort Wayne (1803) was the first of four treaties negotiated with the Miamis between 1803 and 1809. It ceded to the U.S. government a large parcel of land in what became southwest Indiana and parts of Illinois. Most of the Miamis supported the terms of the treaty because very few of them lived on these ceded lands.

Richardville was also one of the leaders of the Mississinewa Miami at treaty negotiations in Fort Wayne in 1809, when Little Turtle was effectively retired from negotiations for the Miamis and the Mississinewa council took charge of the Miami interests. Although Richardville initially resisted further cession of Miami lands, the Treaty of Fort Wayne (1809) ceded Miami land along the Wabash River to the federal government in exchange for strengthening Miami control in areas of present-day northern Indiana.

=== Emerging leader ===
After the death of his uncle, Chief Pacanne, in 1815, fifty-five-year-old Richardville emerged as principal chief of the Miamis. Francis Godfroy also joined Richardville as an influential leader of the Miamis. Due to the two métis (mixed blood) men's previous relationships with federal officials, they became treaty-signing chiefs for the Miamis, interpreters at treaty negotiations, and brokers of tribal business affairs. Richardville and Godfroy recognized the value of land and the potential trade profits in an American capitalist society. Together, they worked as intermediaries to protect the Miami tribal interests, as well as their own.

The value of the Miami lands and the arrival of pioneer settlers in what became central Indiana in the early 1800s gave Richardville and the other Miami leaders additional leverage in negotiating sales of their lands. Richardville proved to be a shrewd negotiator on behalf of the Miami people, in addition to increasing his own personal wealth and landholdings in the process. Richardville and the other Miami leaders also delayed treaties calling for the removal of the Miamis from Indiana.

=== Treaty of St. Marys, 1818 ===
Richardville signed the Treaty of St. Mary's (1818), which ceded most of the Miami lands south of the Wabash River in central Indiana to the U.S. government. The treaty's harsh terms were punishment for the Miami people's lack of support to the United States during its War of 1812. The Miamis eventually received 6.4 cents an acre for their land and an increase in their permanent annuity payment to $18,400, among other concessions of goods and services. Richardville and the other Miami leaders also negotiated with federal government officials to exempt from the land cessions an area known as the Miami National Reserve, a tract of land encompassing 875,000 acres (354,000 hectares) , approximately 37 square miles (96 km^{2}), in central Indiana, east of present-day Kokomo and 30 miles (48 km) northeast of Indianapolis. Because of its location near proposed highway and canal routes, the Miami National Reserve was one of the most potentially valuable pieces of land for commercial development in Indiana. The remaining Miami lands not ceded to the federal government were divided into six village reserves and 24 individual land allotments.

As part of the terms of the treaties with American Indians, individual land allotments were granted primarily to treaty signatories and métis tribal members such as Richardville, allegedly to “reinforce the European rather than the Indian concept of land use.” Although these individual grants were legal, they also could be interpreted as incentives to secure the tribal leaders' cooperation and support of the negotiated treaty. Of the 24 individual land grants made under the terms of the treaty, 20 of them went to métis individuals living in the area and their families. Richardville, who signed the treaty as the principal Miami chief, received 5,760 acres (2,330 hectares) of land for himself as part of the treaty agreement; tribal leaders Francis Godfroy and Louis Godfroy each received 3,840 acres (1,550 hectares).

=== Treaty of Mississinewas (1826) ===
The Treaty of Mississinewas was concluded near the mouth of Mississinewa River in Indiana on October 23, 1826, with 37 representatives of the Miami people, including Richardville, and three representatives of the federal government, Lewis Cass, James B. Ray, and John Tipton. Under the treaty's terms, the Miamis ceded their claims to land north and west of the Wabash and Miami Rivers, as well as the land cessions made by the tribe under the terms of the Treaty of Saint Marys (1818), with the exception of reserved land at six village sites, reserve lands on the Eel River at the mouth of Mud Creek and at the forks of the Wabash, and tribal reservation lands along the Wabash River.

In addition to other concessions such as goods and equipment, livestock, annual annuity payments in cash and goods, part-time laborers, and payment of some of the Miamis' debts as outlined in the treaty, the federal government agreed to pay $600 each to nine individuals, including Richardville, to subsidize construction of homes for themselves and their families. Richardville was also among those who received individual grants of land, although these lands could not be sold without prior approval from the U.S. president. The treaty terms also granted a $2,000 annual annuity to be used to educate Miami children and to care for the Miamis who were poor and infirm. It also gave the Miamis the right to hunt on the ceded lands owned by the federal government and gave the State of Indiana the right to establish a canal or road through the Miamis' reserve lands.

=== Treaties of 1834, 1838, and 1840 ===
Richardville opposed Miami removal from Indiana, but after recognizing that the time had come to secure the best terms for their land and eventual removal, he signed treaties in 1834, 1838, and a final one in 1840 that ceded most of the Miami National Reserve land to the U.S. government. In the treaty signed at the Forks of the Wabash on October 23, 1834, the Miamis ceded tribal lands in Indiana that had been reserved for them under the terms of previous treaties in exchange for cash annuities, payment of tribal debts, and other concessions. Additional land grants were made to individuals, including Richardville, who received three and one-quarter sections of land, about 2,080 acres (840 hectares). The terms of the treaty also provided Richardville and five other chiefs with fee simple titles to their land allotments, including that land that Richardville had been granted under the terms of earlier treaties. The fee simple titles allowed Richardville and the others who received them the authority to dispose of their property without obtaining prior approval from the federal government.

Among the terms of a treaty made in 1838 at the Forks of the Wabash, a total of 48 land grants were made to individuals, all of them official members of the Miami tribe, in exchange for cessions of additional Miami lands. Richardville received an additional 4,800 acres (1,900 hectares) of land, Francis Godfroy received 3,840 acres (1,550 hectares), and additional reserve lands were allotted to other Miami tribal members. In the Treaty of the Wabash (1840) signed on November 28, 1840, the Miami people finally agreed to cede their remaining tribal lands of 500,000 acres (200,000 hectares) of the Miami National Reserve in Indiana in exchange for 500,000 acres (200,000 hectares) in what became present-day Kansas and agreed to their removal from Indiana within five years, among other terms. Under the treaty of 1840, Richardville was granted an additional seven sections of land, about 4,480 acres (1,810 hectares), and $25,000 in cash. Richardville's son-in-law, Francis La Fontaine, was granted one section of land, 640 acres (260 hectares), and Francis Godfroy's estate was granted $15,000. The treaty also granted Richardville and others who had received individual land grants exemption from removal from the state, meaning that about half of the Miami people would be allowed to remain in Indiana.

== Later years ==
According to historian Donald Chaput in "The Family of Drouet de Richeville: Merchants, Soldiers, and Chiefs of Indiana," Richardville became "one of the richest men in the United States." In Information Respecting the History, Condition and Prospects of the Indian Tribes of the United States (1868), Henry R. Schoolcroft described Richardville as "the most wealthy man of the native race in America." According to Chaput, who used Schoolcraft's book as his source, Richardville had about $200,000 in cash at the time of his death in 1841 and owned thousands of acres of land in Indiana, as well as his stately brick home in Fort Wayne.

Some sources have claimed that Richardville eventually controlled more than 20 square miles (52 km^{2}) along the St. Joseph, St. Marys, Mississinewa, Salamonie, and Wabash Rivers. Historian Stewart Rafert acknowledged that Richardville was the recipient of a total of 28,320 acres (11,460 hectares) of land granted under the terms of various treaties and $31,800 in cash settlements, but went on to explain that most of Richardville's land went to his associates. In his later years, Richardville retained only a few hundred acres in Indiana, including the site of his home in Fort Wayne and land at the Forks of the Wabash. He also often offered his private lands as a refuge for family members and other Miamis living in Indiana who had no other place to live.

== Death and legacy ==
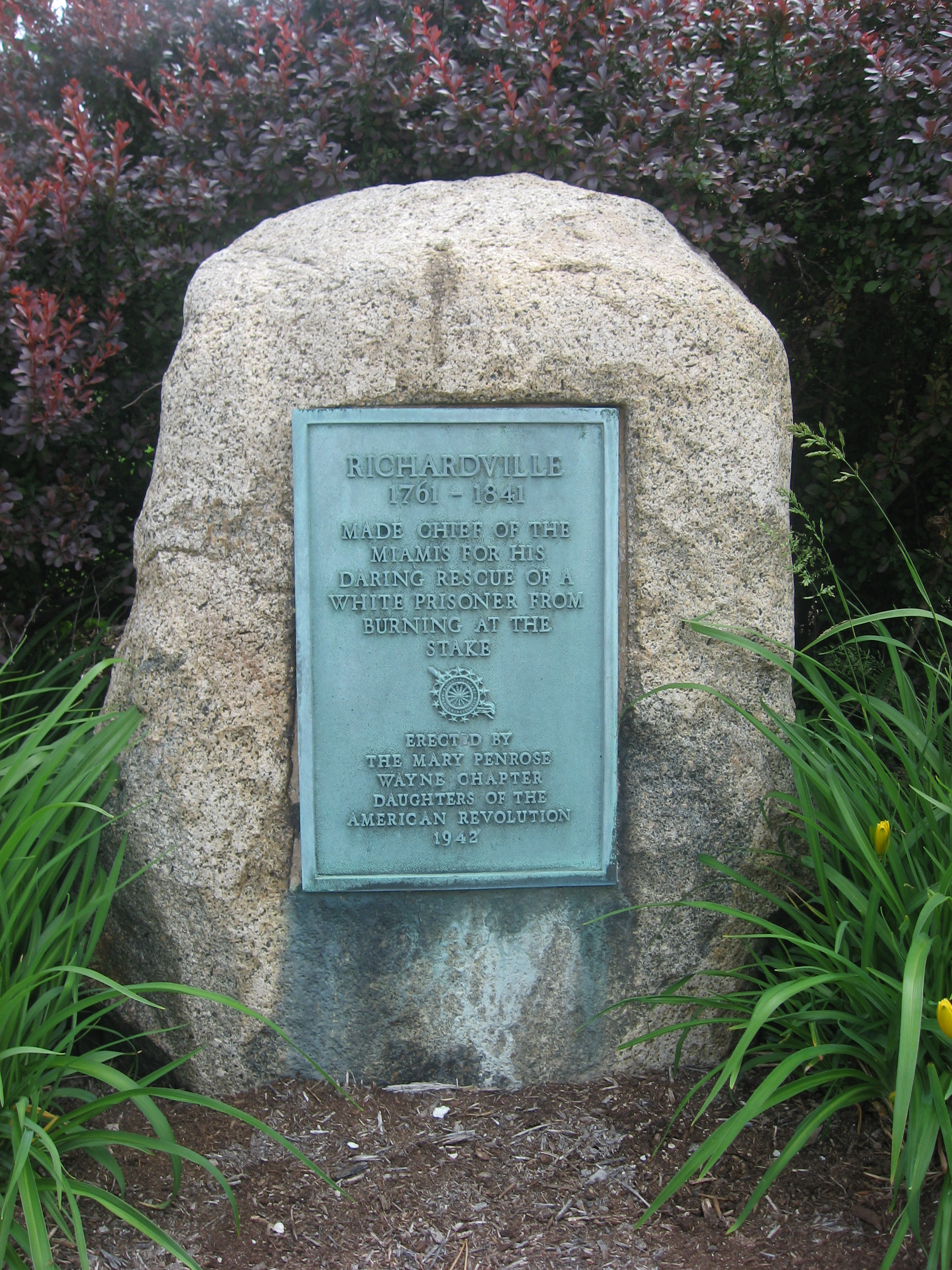
Richardville's grave at the Cathedral of the Immaculate Conception in Fort Wayne

Richardville died on August 13, 1841, at his home along the Saint Marys River, southeast of Fort Wayne, in Allen County, Indiana. His remains were interred in the cemetery at the Cathedral of the Immaculate Conception in Fort Wayne. In addition to his landholdings and other property, Richardville allegedly left about $200,000 in cash. Under the terms of his will, Richardville bequeathed his property to his surviving children and other relatives. Richardville's son-in-law, Francis La Fontaine (Topeah), the husband of his daughter, Catherine Richardville (Pocongoquah), succeeded him as chief of the Miamis.

About half of the Miami people, including members of Richardville's, Francis Godfroy's, and Chief Metocinyah's family, among others, remained in Indiana after the U.S. government officially removed the Miamis to Indian Territory west of the Mississippi River, in 1846, five years after Richardville's death. Under the provisions of treaties signed with the Miami people in 1838 and 1840, a total of 126 Miamis were allowed to remain in Indiana; 43 of them were members of Richardville's family; 28 were members of Francis Godfroy's family; and the remaining 55 were members of Metocinyah's family. These individuals, along with 22 others, became the original 148 members of the Miami Nation of Indiana, which began on October 6, 1846. Since the 1860s, some of Richardville's descendants have migrated from Indiana to settle in Kansas and the present-day state of Oklahoma, but many more of his descendants remained in Indiana.

Richardville's life experiences are an example of many métis leaders in the Midwest after the War of 1812. Well educated as a youth, he learned to speak three languages and became a prominent trader. As Richardville gained influence among the Miami people, he succeeded in becoming the principal chief. As a negotiator and signatory on treaties made on behalf of the Miamis, he tried to protect their interests at a time when the political power of American Indians was in decline. While he personally benefitted from his role as a tribal chief and treaty negotiator, Richardville also tried to obtain favorable terms for the Miami people and the best prices available for their lands. In addition, he and other Miami leaders successfully delayed removal of the Miami people from Indiana until the signing of the Treaty of the Wabash (1840), a year before Richardville's death. In his later years Richardville also provided displaced Miamis with a place to stay on his Indiana land.

Assessment of Richardville's actions as a treaty negotiator and civil chief of the Miamis are varied. Some of these are favorable; others are highly critical. Hugh McCulloch, former U.S. Secretary of the Treasury and a contemporary of Richardville, described him as one "of whom no one ever got the better in a trade." In Wallace Brice's History of Fort Wayne (1868), Richardville is described as "beloved and esteemed" and "prudent and deliberate." However, in Narrative of an Expedition to the Source of St. Peter's River (1824), author William H. Keating called the Miami chief "one of the most artful and deceitful of his nation." Bert Anson, author of The Miami Indians (1970) took the middle ground in his assessment of Richardville's leadership. Anson recognized Richardville's shrewd negotiating abilities in arranging "good terms of other Miami chiefs and bands," as well as his own financial gain. Anson also found that Richardville also took care of his family and friends, and, most importantly, delayed for decades the removal of the Miami people from Indiana.

== Residences ==
Richardville's properties in Indiana included Richardville House, his brick home in Fort Wayne. This residence became famous for its Greek Revival architecture, size, and stylish furnishings. Another Richardville property is at the Forks of the Wabash in Huntington County, Indiana.

=== Richardville House ===
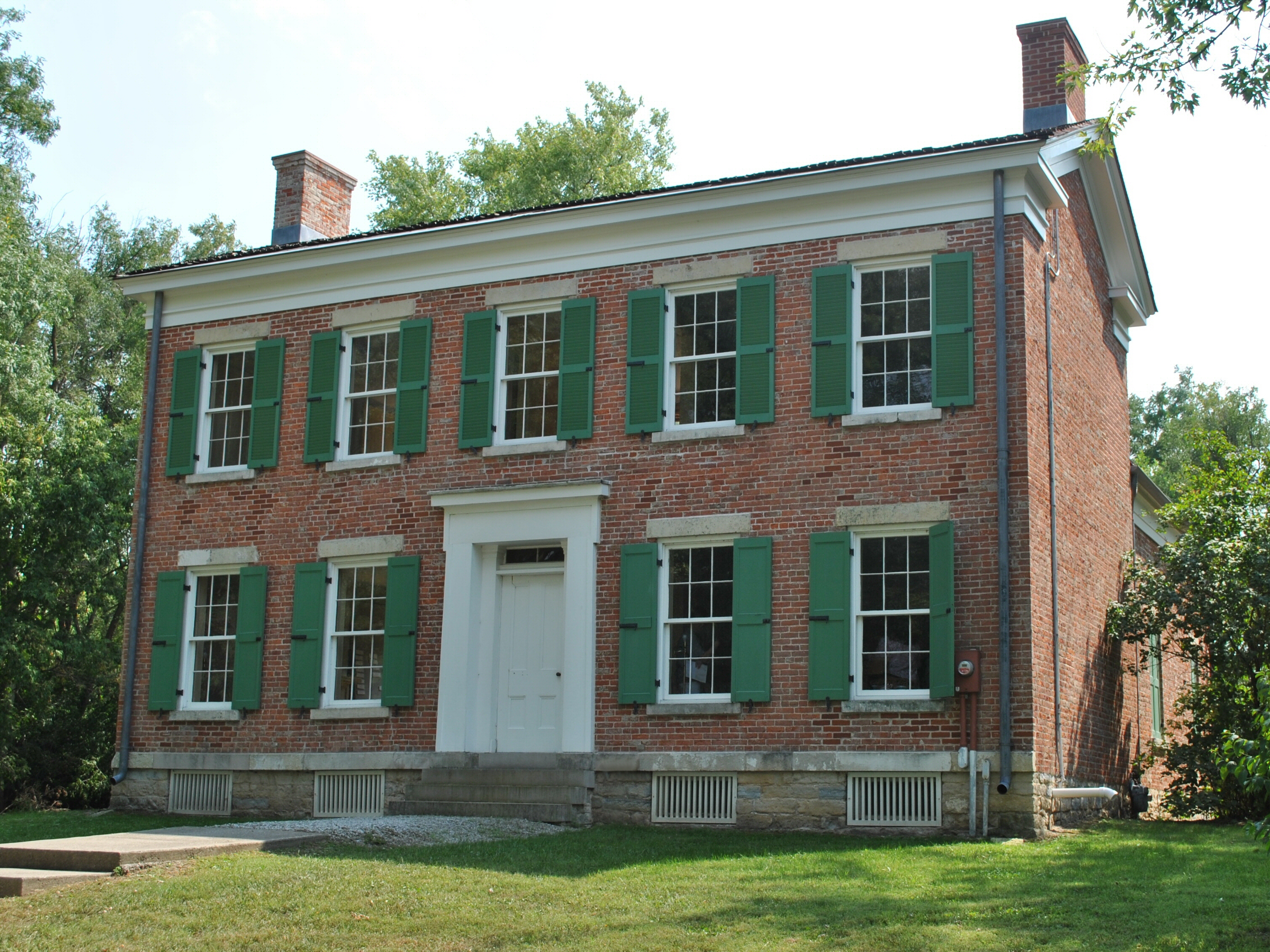
Richardville House in Fort Wayne, Indiana

Under the terms of the Treaty of Mississinewas (1826), the U.S. government gave Richardville and nine other chiefs $600 each toward construction of a two-room brick home for themselves and their families. Richardville, who wanted a larger, more elaborate two-story residence contributed an additional $1,600 of his own funds to pay for the house, which had a total estimated cost at the time of $2,200. When completed in 1827, Richardville House in Fort Wayne, Indiana, became the first documented Greek Revival-style I-house in northeastern Indiana. The home is also one of the few surviving treaty houses in the eastern United States that is still standing on its original site.

The house served as Richardville's primary residence until his death in 1841 and remained in the family until 1894, when it was acquired by a gravel company that mined all but approximately 1 acre (0.40 hectares) of land surrounding the house. In 1991, the Allen County–Fort Wayne Historical Society acquired the house and restored its exterior. The society opens the house monthly during the summer season for visitors, and operates a variety of programs on Miami history at the site. In 2012 the U.S. Department of the Interior designated the home as a National Historic Landmark.

=== Chief Richardville House and Miami Treaty Grounds ===
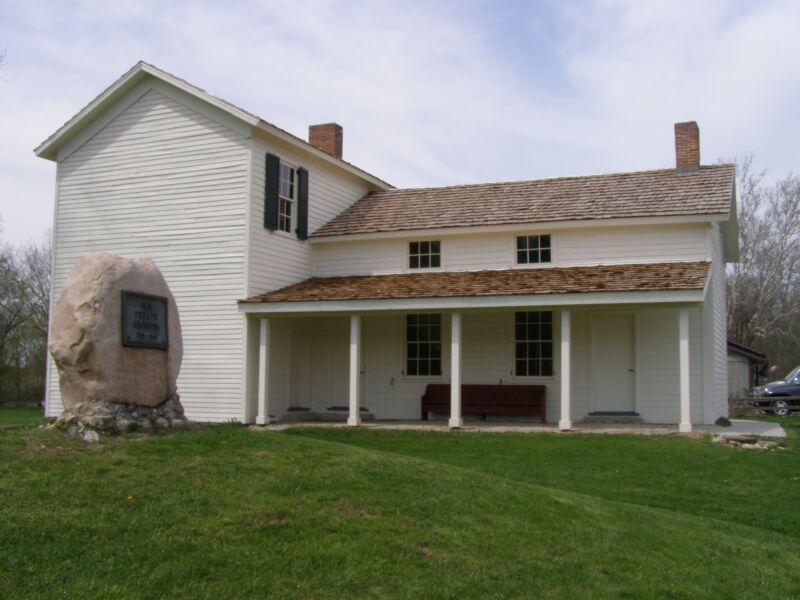
Chief Richardville house, ca. 2008, at Huntington, Indiana

The Chief Richardville House and Miami Treaty Grounds are part of the Forks of the Wabash historic park along the Wabash River, 2 miles (3.2 km) west of Huntington in Huntington County, Indiana. Richardville moved the Miami council house (tribal headquarters) from Fort Wayne to the Miami reserve land at the Forks of the Wabash in 1831. As part of the provisions of a treaty with the Miamis in 1834, the land grant at the Forks of the Wabash was converted to a fee simple title in Richardville's name. A treaty at the Forks of the Wabash was signed at this site in 1838, as well as the Treaty of the Wabash (1840). Sources disagree on whether the home at the Forks of the Wabash was built by and for Richardville or his son-in-law, Francis LaFontaine. While it is likely that Richardville stayed on the Forks of the Wabash property during treaty negotiations, some have argued that the Greek Revival-style home was built in 1843–44, two or three years after Richarville's death. The home was later restored to its 1846 appearance. The property at the Forks of the Wabash was added to the National Register of Historic Places in 1985.

== Honors and tributes ==
- Richardville County, Indiana, was named in honor of Chief Richardville and was later renamed Howard County.
- Wildcat Creek (Indiana), whose watershed encompasses Howard and another Indiana county, was named for Richardville.
- The Indiana Sesquicentennial Commission erected a state historical marker in honor of Richardville at the Forks of the Wabash Historic Park in Huntington in 1966.
- The Indiana Historical Bureau erected a state historical marker honoring Richardville at a site 3 miles (4.8 km) east of Peru in Miami County, Indiana, in 1992.

== See also ==
- Indian removals in Indiana
