= Forks of the Wabash =

- Chief Richardville House and Miami Treaty Grounds
- U.S. National Register of Historic Places
- U.S. Historic district
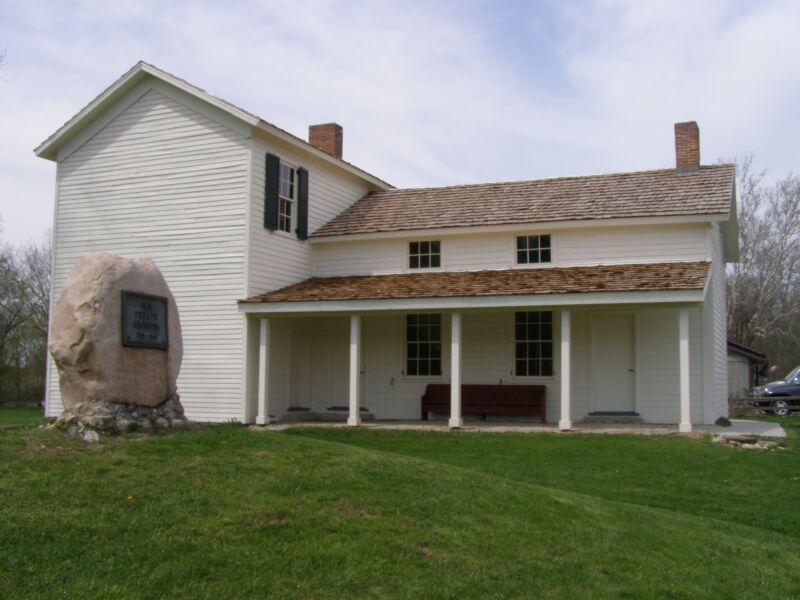
- Chief Richardville house, April 2008

- Location within Indiana Location within the United States
- Nearest city: 2 miles (3.2 km) west of downtown Huntington, southwest of the junction of U.S. Route 24 and State Roads 9/37, Huntington and Huntington Township, Huntington County, Indiana
- Coordinates: 40°52′37″N 85°31′58″W
- Area: 7.3 acres (3.0 ha)
- Built: 1833
- Architectural style: Greek Revival
- NRHP reference No.: 85002446
- Added to NRHP: September 16, 1985

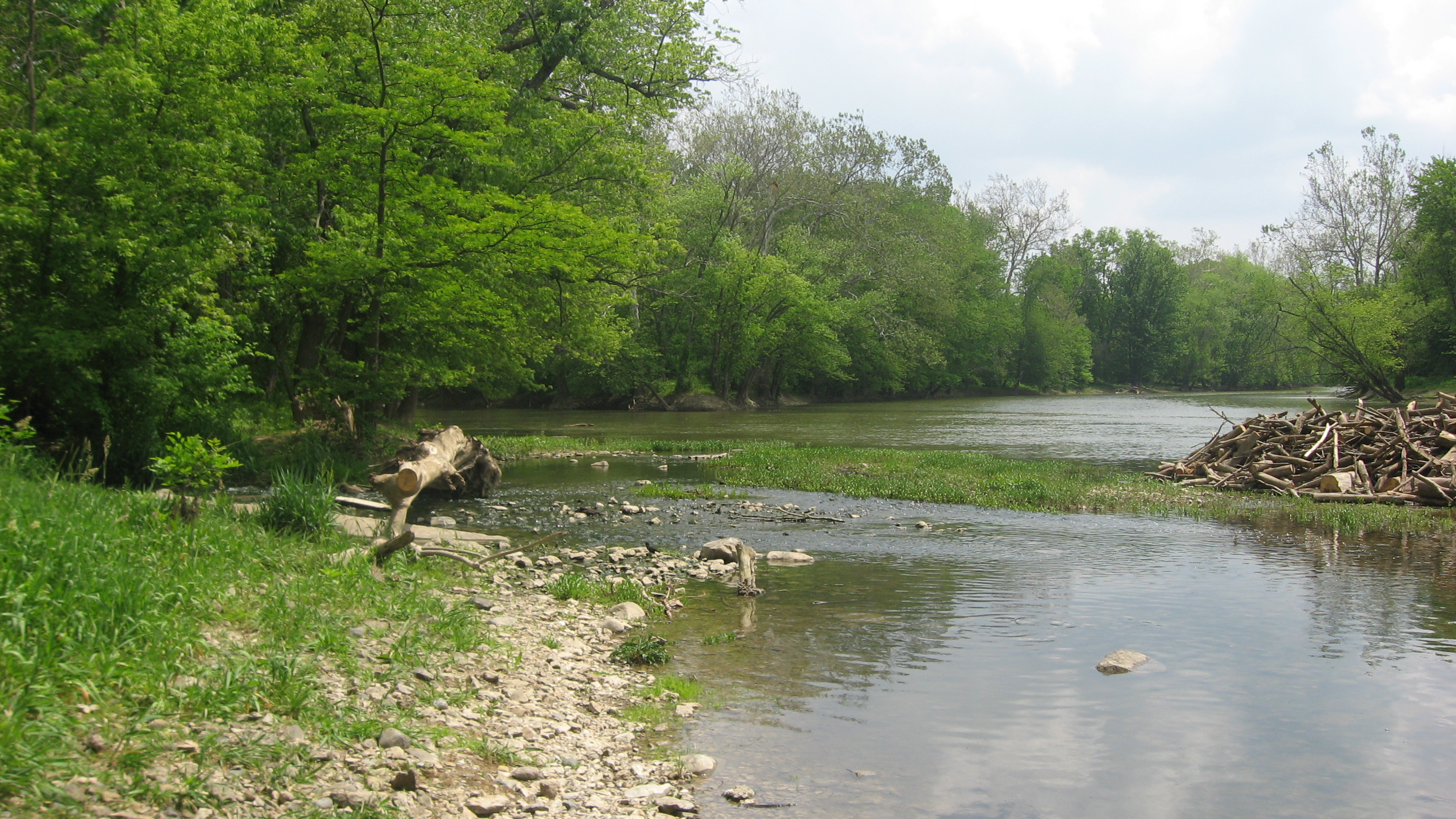
Confluence of the Wabash and Little Wabash Rivers

Historic Forks of the Wabash is a historic museum park near Huntington, Indiana, that features several historic buildings, trails and remnants of the Wabash and Erie Canal. The location was the signing location of the historic Treaty at the Forks of the Wabash in 1838. The park is located along the Wabash River. It was listed on the National Register of Historic Places in 1985 as the Chief Richardville House and Miami Treaty Grounds.

Historic structures include:

- Chief's House - Council house believed to have been used by Miami tribe Chief Jean Baptiste de Richardville during treaty negotiations and Miami Council meetings. Other sources indicate that his son-in-law, Francis La Fontaine, actually built the house in the early 1840s for use as his main residence. The house has been restored to appear as in 1846.
- Nuck Log House - 1841 pioneer log house
- School House - Pioneer-era log schoolhouse furnished for the 1880s

Ball State University conducted an archaeological dig at the Chief's House in 1989 which uncovered artifacts including nails, brick, glass, toys, housewares, and personal items. An additional excavation occurred in 1999.

The park offers programs for groups of all ages. Topics include archaeology, canals and transportation, pioneer life, Woodland Indian history, and art.

== See also ==
- List of archaeological sites on the National Register of Historic Places in Indiana
- Miami people
