= Treaty of the Wabash =

1840 treaty between the United States and Miami

- Type: Land purchase
- Signed: November 28, 1840; 184 years ago
- Location: Forks of the Wabash, Indiana
- Condition: Transfer of money and goods to natives
- Parties: United States of America; Miami
- Language: English

The Treaty of the Wabash was an agreement between the United States government and Native American Miami tribes in Indiana on November 28, 1840.

On November 28, 1840, the United States government entered negotiations with the Miami tribe of northwestern Indiana seeking to purchase their land for white settlement. The United States was represented by two commissioners, Samuel Milroy, and Allen Hamilton. The United States had already purchased the Miami claim to the region in the Treaty at the Forks of the Wabash, and the Pottawatomie were the only natives who still held a claim in the region. The land purchased was in the region of the headwaters of the Wabash in north central Indiana, and constituted no more than about 500,000 acres.

Art. 1. The Miami Tribe of Indians do hereby cede to the United States all that tract of land on the south side of the Wabash river, not heretofore ceded, and commonly known as "the residue of the Big Reserve." Being all of their remaining lands in Indiana.

In exchange, the government promised a payment of $550,000. The first $300,000 would be used immediately to pay the debts of the tribe as outlined in the treaty's additional articles. The remaining $250,000 would be paid in annual installments over 20 years. The debts included the traditional debts in individual debts to local traders as well as its debts to tribal leaders; $25,000 John B. Richardville and $15,000 to the estate of Francis Godfroy. The annual payments were to be paid at Fort Wayne until the tribe emigrated to lands west of the Mississippi. Additionally, the treaty confirmed land transfers that were granted in the treaty of 6 November 1838. An additional grant was made to Richardville of lands at the Forks of the Wabash.

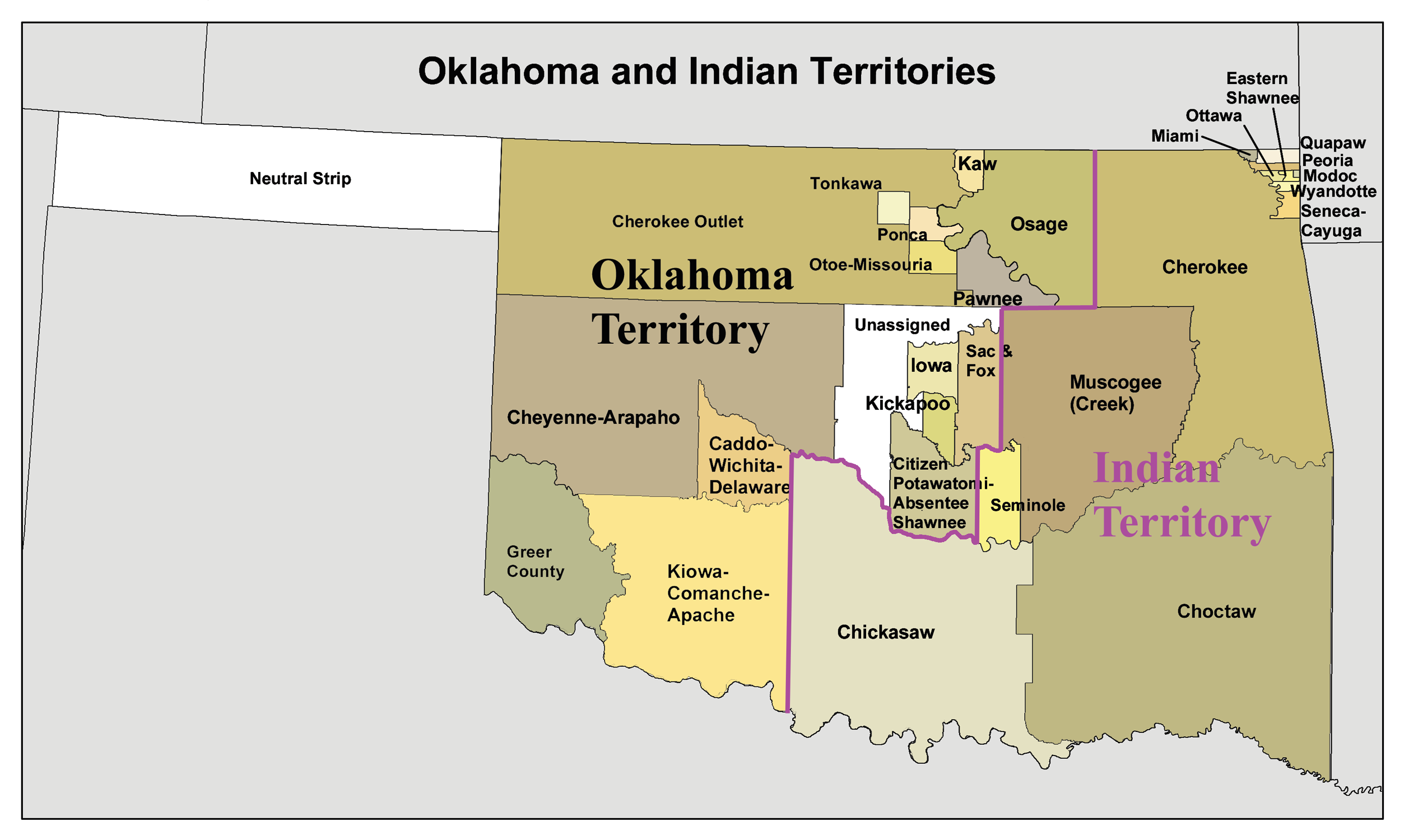
Miami treaty lands in Northeast Oklahoma

The tribe agreed to accept designated lands in the Indian Territory, in present-day Oklahoma as a final place of settlement.

== See also ==
- Indian removals in Indiana
