= Treaty of Mississinewas =

Treaty between the United States and Potawatomi tribes

The Treaty of Mississinewas or the Treaty of Mississinewa also called Treaty of the Wabash is an 1826 treaty between the United States and the Miami and Potawatomi Tribes regarding purchase of Indian lands in Indiana and Michigan. The signing was held at the mouth of the Mississinewa River on the Wabash, hence the name.

== Terms ==
After negotiations with the Potawatomi to build the Michigan Road through Indiana by James B. Ray and Lewis Cass on behalf of President John Quincy Adams, Cass negotiated a pair of treaties to purchase lands in Indiana and Michigan, collectively called the Treaty of Mississinewa. By the treaty, the Miami leadership agreed to cede to the United States the bulk of Miami reservation lands held in Indiana by previous treaties. In compensation, the families of Chief Richardville and certain other Miami notables were given estates in Indiana, with houses like the Richardville House and livestock furnished at government expense. The federal government agreed to buy out some of the estates granted by the previous Treaty of St. Mary's. Small reservations were to be carved out along the Eel and Maumee rivers.

The tribe was also to be compensated with $31,040.53, $10,000 of this in silver, the first year; and $26,259.47 in goods the next. Promises were made of a $15,000 annuity thereafter, in addition to monies provided for by other treaties. $2,000 per annum was to be set aside for the "…poor infirm persons of the Miami tribe, and for the education of the youth of the said tribe…" as long as the Congress should "…think proper…" Hunting rights would continue to be enjoyed "…so long as the same shall be the property of the United States."

== Problems ==
Adherence to the treaty terms was difficult for both sides. White treaty makers did not necessarily understand the complexities and fluidity of Indian tribal societies, and often overestimated the nature of the authority vested in a particular chief by the band, the permanence of tribal membership and intertribal alliances, and the permanence of Indian settlements, which often shifted according to the season. Younger males were more likely than their elders to prefer the use of force against white settlers to negotiations. Mixed-race native and Canadien tribal members were more likely to support the treaty and its implementation, as they benefited more from land grants and subsidies than other tribespeople. Disagreements about the applicability of treaty terms made it more difficult to create the Michigan Road on lands that were supposed to have been ceded by the treaty.

== See also ==
- Indian removals in Indiana
