= Indian removals in Indiana =

Removal of native tribes from Indiana

Land that was transferred under the various treaties

Indian removals in Indiana followed a series of the land cession treaties made between 1795 and 1846 that led to the removal of most of the native tribes from Indiana. Some of the removals occurred prior to 1830, but most took place between 1830 and 1846. The Lenape (Delaware), Piankashaw, Kickapoo, Wea, and Shawnee were removed in the 1820s and 1830s, but the Potawatomi and Miami removals in the 1830s and 1840s were more gradual and incomplete, and not all of Indiana's Native Americans voluntarily left the state. The most well-known resistance effort in Indiana was the forced removal of Chief Menominee and his Yellow River band of Potawatomi in what became known as the Potawatomi Trail of Death in 1838, in which 859 Potawatomi were removed to Kansas and at least forty died on the journey west. The Miami were the last to be removed from Indiana, but tribal leaders delayed the process until 1846. Many of the Miami were permitted to remain on land allotments guaranteed to them under the Treaty of St. Mary's (1818) and subsequent treaties.

Between 1803 and 1809, future President William Henry Harrison negotiated more than a dozen treaties on behalf of the federal government that purchased nearly all the Indian-owned land in most of present-day Illinois and the southern third of Indiana from various tribes. Most of the Wea and the Kickapoo were removed west to Illinois and Missouri after 1813. The Treaty of St. Mary's led to the removal of the Delaware, in 1820, and the remaining Kickapoo, who removed west of the Mississippi River. After the United States Congress passed the Indian Removal Act (1830), removals in Indiana became part of a larger nationwide effort that was carried out under President Andrew Jackson's administration. Most of the tribes had already removed from the state. The only major tribes remaining in Indiana were the Miami and the Potawatomi, and both of them were already confined to reservation lands under the terms of previous treaties. Between 1832 and 1837 the Potawatomi ceded their Indiana land and agreed to remove to reservations in Kansas. A small group joined the Potawatomi in Canada. Between 1834 and 1846 the Miami ceded their reservation land in Indiana and agreed to remove west of the Mississippi River; the major Miami removal to Kansas occurred in October 1846.

Not all of Indiana's Native Americans left the state. Less than one half of the Miami removed. More than a half of the Miami either returned to Indiana or were never required to leave under the terms of the treaties. The Pokagon Band of Potawatomi Indians were the only other Indians left in the state after the end of the removals. Native Americans remaining in Indiana settled on privately owned land and eventually merged into the majority culture, although some retained ties to their Native American heritage. Members of the Miami Nation of Indiana concentrated along the Wabash River, while other Native Americans settled in Indiana's urban centers. In 2000 the state's population included more than 39,000 Native Americans from more than 150 tribes.

== Indian settlement ==
The Miami people and the Potawatomi were the most important native tribes to establish themselves in the region now known as Indiana. In the late seventeenth and early eighteenth centuries, some of these Algonquians returned from the north, where they had sought refuge from the Iroquois during the Beaver Wars. The Miami remained Indiana's largest tribal group, and had a significant presence along the Maumee, Wabash, and Miami rivers in what is now central and west central Indiana. Its capital settlement was Kekionga near present-day Fort Wayne, Indiana. They also held land in a large part of northwest Ohio. The Potawatomi settled north of the Wabash River, along Lake Michigan in northern Indiana, and in present-day Michigan. The Wea settled on the middle Wabash, near present-day Lafayette; the Piankeshaw established themselves near the French settlement at Vincennes; and the Eel River band settled along the river in northwestern and north central Indiana. The Shawnee came to west central Indiana after American colonists forced them out of Ohio. Smaller groups, including the Lenape (Delaware), Wyandott, Kickapoo, and others were scattered across other areas. These native tribes lived in agricultural villages along the rivers and exchanged furs for European goods with French traders, who began to arrive in region in the late 1600s.

== Treaties ==
=== Early treaties ===
Following Britain's victory over the French in the French and Indian War (as part of the Seven Years' War), the 1763 Treaty of Paris which ended the war gave the British nominal control over North American territories east of the Mississippi River. Upon hearing news of the victory, thousands of American settlers moved westward to settle east of the Mississippi. After the Indian tribes in the region, dissatisfied with British policies, launched Pontiac's War, the Crown issued the Royal Proclamation of 1763, which forbade American colonists from settling west of the Appalachian Mountains—an act which proved ineffective. Westward movement of American settlers onto Indian lands continued.

After the American Revolutionary War, Great Britain and the newly independent United States signed the 1783 Treaty of Paris, in which Britain ceded to the Americans a large portion of their land claims in North America, including present-day Indiana, but the native tribes who occupied the land argued that they had not been represented in the treaty negotiations and ignored its terms. Further negotiations were held to establish compensation for the loss of tribal lands, while American military expeditions were called to control Indian resistance. An Indian confederacy waged war against the Americans, but the confederacy was defeated at the Battle of Fallen Timbers (1794), at the conclusion of the Northwest Indian War. With the loss of British military support and supplies after their withdrawal from the Northwest Territory, the defeat was a turning point that lead to land cessions and the eventual removal of most Native Americans from present-day Indiana.

The 1795 Treaty of Greenville was the first to cede Native American land in what became the state of Indiana and made it easier for American settlers to reach territorial lands north of the Ohio River. Under its terms, the American government acquired two-thirds of present-day Ohio, a small tract of land in what would become southeastern Indiana, the Wabash-Maumee portage (near the present-day site of Fort Wayne, Indiana), and early settlements at Vincennes, Ouiatenon (in present-day Tippecanoe County, Indiana, and Clark's Grant, (near present-day Clarksville, Indiana, along the Ohio River. In exchange, the Indians received goods valued at $20,000 and annuity payments. Most of the remaining territory, including a large portion of present-day Indiana, remained occupied by native tribes, but the tribes living along the Wabash-Maumee portage had to relocate. The Shawnee removed east to Ohio; the Delaware established villages along the White River; and the Miami at Kekionga moved to the Upper Wabash and its tributaries.

=== Territorial treaties ===
Indian removal followed a sequence of the land cession treaties that began during Indiana's territorial era. The Northwest Ordinance (1787), which created the Northwest Territory, provided for the future division of western land into smaller territories, including the Indiana Territory, established in 1800. One of the immediate needs for the federal government and William Henry Harrison, who was appointed governor of the Indiana Territory in 1800 and served until 1812, was to encourage rapid settlement by reducing threats of violence from the area's native tribes and to establish a policy for acquiring ownership of territorial lands. Harrison initially had no power to negotiate treaties with the tribes; however, after his reappointment in 1803, Thomas Jefferson granted Harrison the authority to conduct negotiations with the tribes and to open up new land for settlement, primarily the American claim to the Vincennes tract. The Vincennes tract had been purchased by the French colonial authorities from the natives in the mid-18th century and transferred to Britain after the French and Indian War, and finally to the Americans at the end of the Revolutionary War.

Harrison intended to expand settlement beyond the small population centers of Vincennes and Clarks Grant through a series of land cession treaties. Efforts were also made to establish the Indians as farmers. The other alternative was their removal to unsettled lands farther west. Harrison's tactics to obtain land cessions from the Indians included aggressive negotiations with the weaker tribes first, and then divide and conquer the remaining groups. The American military was available to resolve any conflicts. Harrison offered annuity payments of money and goods in exchange for land as part of his negotiations. He also rewarded cooperative tribal leaders with trips to Washington, D.C., and offered bribes. Negotiations often relied on intermediaries, especially those who could act as interpreters, such as Jean Baptiste Richardville, William Wells, William Conner, and others.

Between 1803 and 1809, Harrison negotiated land cession treaties with the Delaware, Shawnee, Potawatomi, and Miami tribes, among others, to secure nearly all the Indian land in most of present-day Illinois and the southern third of Indiana for new settlement. In total, Harrison negotiated thirteen land treaties across the Northwest Territory, which included eleven land cession treaties from 1803 through 1809 that encompassed more than 2.5 million acres (10,000 km^{2}) of land in the Indiana Territory. Several factors worked in Harrison's favor: a declining fur trade, the Indians' increased dependency on annuity payments and manufactured goods, and internal conflicts among the tribes, many of whom did not agree with the American concept of land ownership and transfer of land titles.

Harrison's first treaty, the 1803 Treaty of Vincennes, was successful in getting the Wea and the Miami to recognize American ownership of the Vincennes tract between Kaskaskia and Clark's Grant.

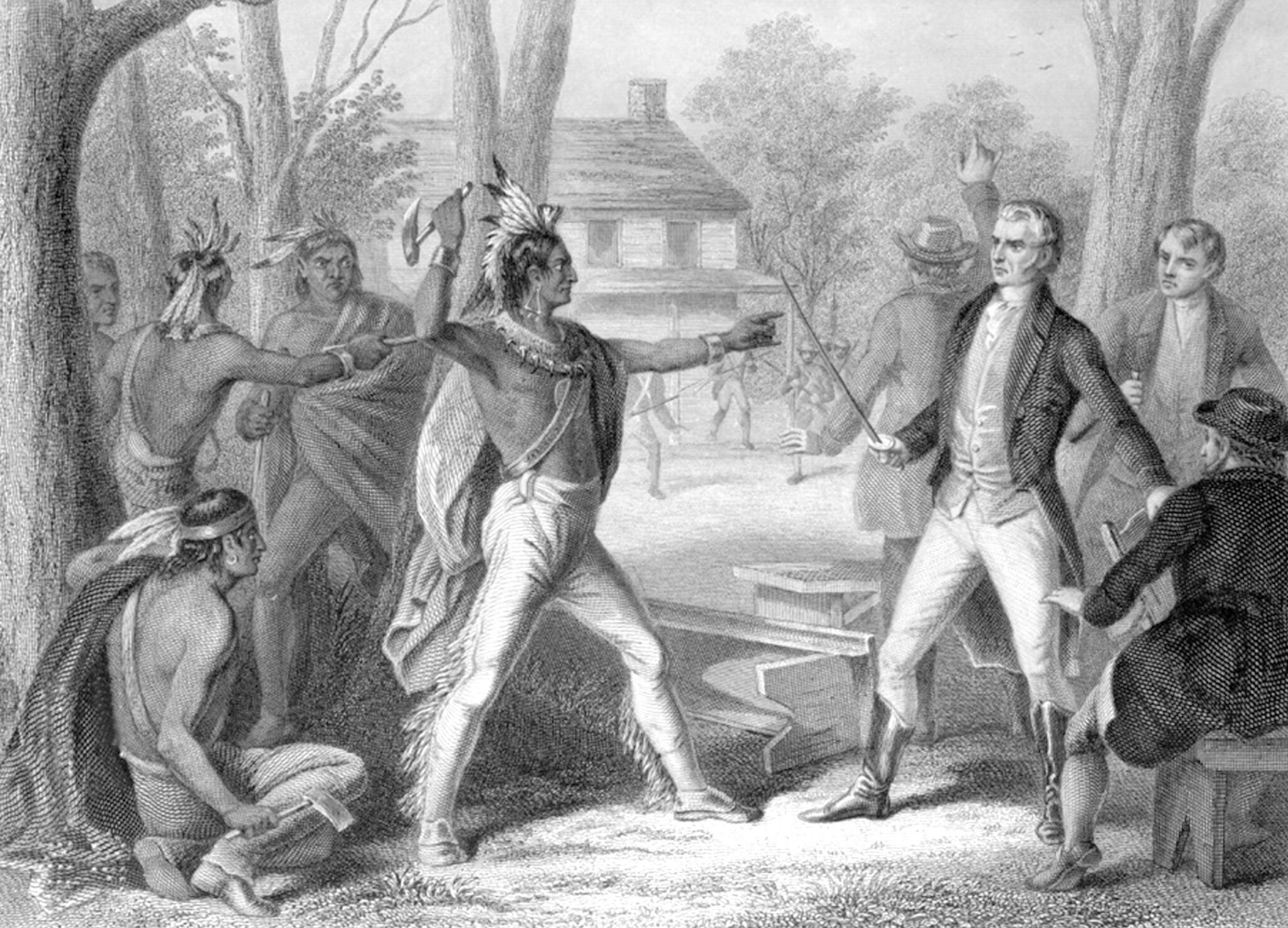
At Vincennes in 1810, Tecumseh threatens William Henry Harrison when he refuses to rescind the Treaty of Fort Wayne.

The Treaty of Grouseland (1805) was the second significant treaty to expand the Indiana Territory for additional settlement. Harrison negotiated with the Delaware, Potawatomi, Miami, Wea, and the Eel River band at Grouseland, Harrison's home at Vincennes. Under its terms the tribes ceded their land in southern Indiana south of the Grouseland Line, which began at the northeast corner of the Vincennes tract and passed northeast to the Greenville Treaty Line. Settlers, like Squire Boone, moved into the new land and established new towns, including Corydon—the future territorial capital—in 1808, and Madison in 1809.

Under the terms of the Treaty of Fort Wayne (1809) Harrison purchased an estimated 2.5 million acres (10,000 km^{2}) of land, now a part of present-day Illinois and Indiana, from the Miami. The Shawnee, who were not included in the negotiations, inhabited the western tract of land that the Miami ceded to the federal government sold were angered by its terms, but Harrison refused to rescind the treaty. In August 1810 Harrison and the Shawnee leader Tecumseh met at Grouseland to discuss the continued conflict. Tecumseh bitterly complained about the land ceded to the federal government. Speaking through an interpreter, Tecumseh argued: "The Great Sp[i]irit has given them as common property to all the Indians, and that they could not, nor should not be sold without the sent of all." The gathering ended without a resolution, as did a subsequent meeting in 1811. This disagreement escalated into an armed conflict, called Tecumseh's War. The final blow that destroyed the Indian confederacy took place at the Battle of the Thames in Ontario, Canada, where Tecumseh was killed in 1813.

The War of 1812 and subsequent treaties ended the Indians' militant resistance to dispossession of their lands. Although the Miami, Delaware, and Potawatomi remained in Indiana, most of the Wea band and the Kickapoo removed west to Illinois and Missouri. The U.S. government began to change its policy from coexistence with the Indians to increased acquisitions of their lands and provided the first hints of an official removal policy of tribes to the west, beyond the Mississippi River.

=== Treaties after statehood ===
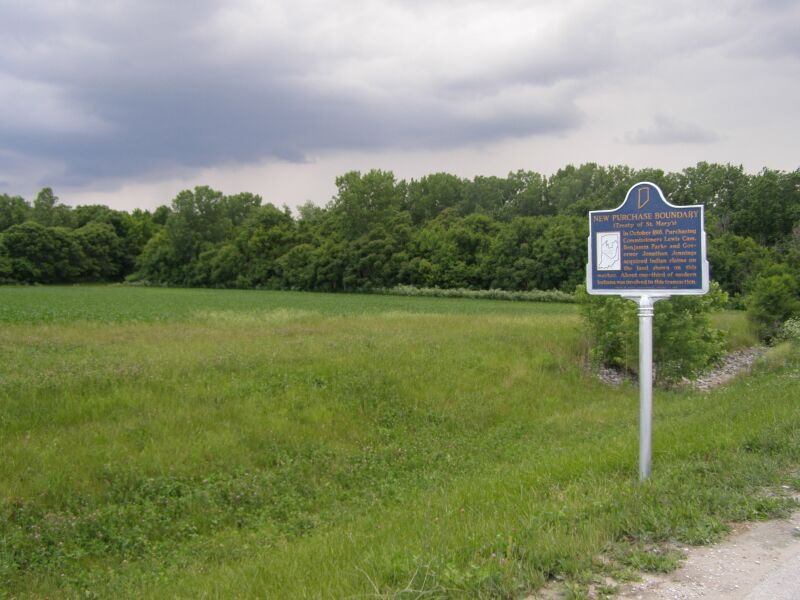
Area of the northern boundary of land cession, west of Delphi, Indiana

In 1818 Jonathan Jennings, the first governor of Indiana, Lewis Cass, and Benjamin Parke negotiated a series of agreements collectively known as the Treaty of St. Mary's with the Miami, Wea, Delaware, Potawatomi, and other tribes that relinquished land in central Indiana and Ohio to the federal government. The treaty with the Miami acquired most of their land south of the Wabash River, except for the Big Miami Reserve in north central Indiana between the Eel River and the Salamonie River. Portions of these lands were assigned to individual members of the Miami tribe. These allotments to individuals would protect many of the Miami, especially its leaders, from removal in 1846. The Miami were in good standing with the state because they had opposed Tecumseh and tried to remain neutral during the War of 1812. Under the terms of the treaty, the Miami also recognized the validity of a treaty with the Kickapoo, made in 1809, and led to the Kickapoo's subsequent removal from Indiana. The Wea, who inhabited the area around present-day Lafayette, Indiana, agreed to a $3,000 annuity for their cessions of land in Indiana, Ohio, and Illinois.

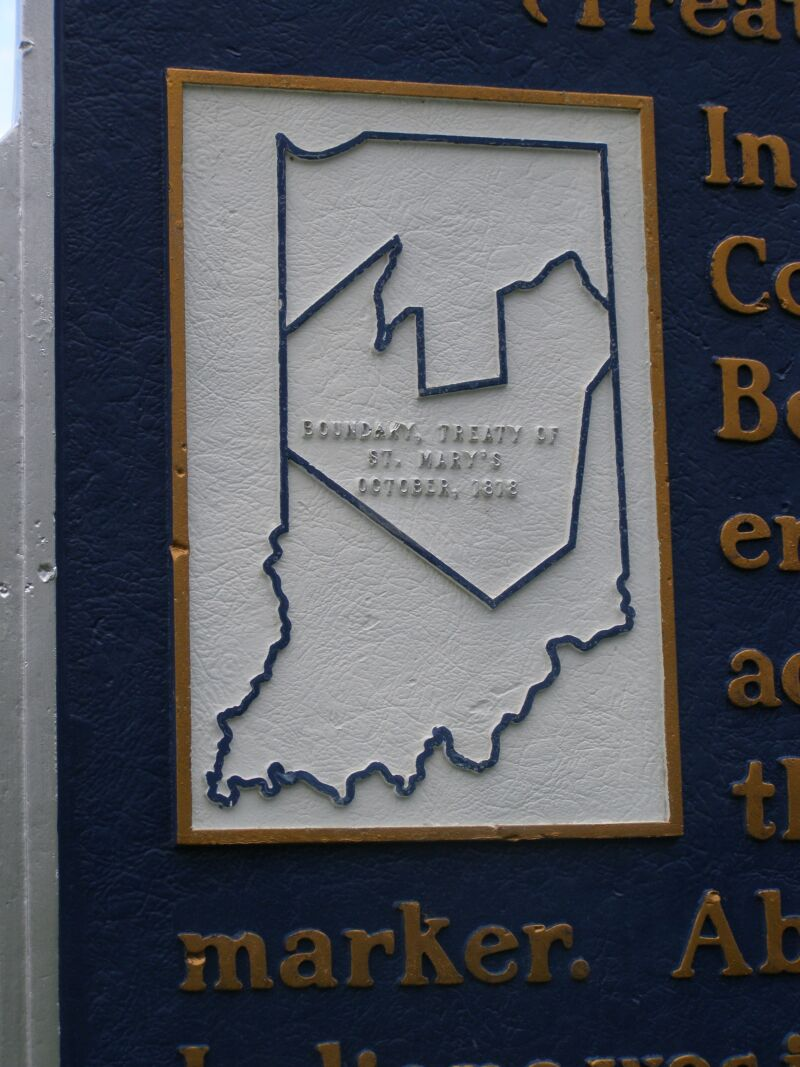
A map of the land cession

Under the terms of the Treaty of St. Mary's, the Lenape (Delaware), who lived in central Indiana, around present-day Indianapolis, ceded their lands to the federal government, opening the area to further settlement, and agreed to leave Indiana and settle on lands provided for them west of the Mississippi River. In exchange for leaving the state, the Lenape were granted gifts and an annuity totaling $15,500. Most of the tribe left for the West during August and September 1820. The Potawatomi received annuities for ceding a portion of their Indiana land. Several tribal members were given individual grants of reservation land. Most of the Potawatomi did not remove from the state until 1838.

After the years of peace that followed the War of 1812 and the land cessions under the Treaty of St. Mary's, Indiana's state government took a more conciliatory approach to Indiana relations, embarking on a plan to "civilize" their members rather than remove them. Using federal grants, several mission schools were opened to educate the tribes and promote Christianity; however, the missions were largely ineffective in meeting their goals.

Land cessions resumed in 1819. On August 30, Benjamin Parke concluded negotiations with the Kickapoo to cede their land in Indiana, which included most of present-day Vermillion County, in exchange for goods worth $3,000 and a ten-year annuity of $2,000 in silver. The treaty was not recognized by the Miami, who claimed the Kickapoos' land, but European-American pioneers continued to settle in the area.

Other agreements with the Wea, Potawatomi, Miami, Delaware, and Kickapoo were reached in 1819, when the tribes were invited to attend a meeting to establish a trade agreement. Trade with the Indians was among the most lucrative enterprises in the state. In exchange for treaty agreements the Wea were granted a $3,000 annuity; the Potawatomi were given a $2,500 annuity; the Delaware received a $4,000 annuity' and the Miami were granted a $15,000 annuity. Smaller amounts were to other tribes. The annuities were accompanied by additional gifts to tribal leaders that were close to the same value of the annuity payments. Tribes also agreed to annual meetings at trading grounds near Fort Wayne, where the annuities would be paid and tribes could sell their goods to traders. The annual event was the most important trading enterprise in the state from 1820 until 1840. Traders would gather and offer goods to the tribes, often at inflated prices and sell them on credit. After the tribes approved the bills traders would take them to the Indian agent, who would pay the claims out of tribe's annuity funds. (Traders frequently served liquor to their customers and took advantage of their drunken state during trading.) Many of the leading politicians in the state, including Jonathan Jennings and John W. Davis, took active part in the trade and made significant profits in the enterprise.

In exchange for land cessions to the federal government, the Native Americans usually received annuities in cash and goods and an agreement to pay tribal debts. In some cases tribes were granted reservation lands for their use, salt, trinkets, and other gifts. Treaty provisions of land allotments to individuals and families and funds for fences, tools, and livestock were intended to help the Indians assimilate as farmers. Some treaties also provided assistance with land clearing, construction of mills, and provisions for blacksmiths, teachers, and schools.

The 1821 Treaty of Chicago concluded negotiations between the federal government and the Michigan Potawatomi to cede a narrow tract of Indiana land along the southern tip of Lake Michigan and extended east of the St. Joseph River, near present-day South Bend, along with other lands in Illinois and the Michigan Territory. In this treaty, the federal government also indicated its intention to construct an east–west road between Chicago, Detroit, and Fort Wayne.

The 1826 Treaty of Mississinewas with the Miami and Potawatomi included most of what remained of the Miami reservation lands in northeastern Indiana and northwestern Ohio, and confined the Miami to their reservations along the Wabash, Mississinewa, and Eel rivers. This included the land they had retained under the Treaty of St. Mary's. During treaty negotiations Lewis Cass described the federal government's rationale for Indian relocation: "[Y]ou have a large tract of land here, which is of no service to you–You do not cultivate it, and this is but little game on it.... Your father owns a large country west of the Mississippi–He is anxious that his red children should remove there." The land cessions freed up the first public lands for settlement in northern Indiana, which developed into South Bend and Michigan City and included much of present-day LaPorte County, and portions of Porter County and Lake County, Indiana. The treaty with the Potawatomi also arranged for the purchase of a narrow tract of land, where the federal government would construct the Michigan Road from Lake Michigan to Ohio River. In exchange for Indiana land north of the Wabash River, with the exception of some reserved lands that assured their continued presence in the area, the Miami agreed to receive livestock, goods, and annuity payments, while the Potawatomi received annuities in cash and goods, and funds from the federal government to erect a mill and employ a miller and blacksmith, among other provisions. The federal government also agreed to pay tribal debts. Treaties with the Potawatomi were renegotiated in October 1832, when the tribe was granted larger annuities in cash and goods which totaled $365,729.87, and set aside land west of the Mississippi River (in present-day Kansas and Missouri) for the tribe's relocation.

== Removals ==
Although the Delaware, Piankashaw, Kickapoo, Wea, and Shawnee tribes removed in the 1820s and 1830s, the Miami and the Potawatomi removals of the 1830s and 1840s were more gradual and incomplete. By 1840 the Miami remained the only "intact tribe wholly within Indiana". Although the Miami agreed to remove in 1840, their tribal leaders delayed the process for several years. Most but not all of the remaining Miami left in 1846.

Removal of Indiana's Native Americans did not begin immediately after the U.S. Congress passed the Indian Removal Act in 1830; however, the Black Hawk War in neighboring Illinois in 1832 renewed the fear of violence between Indiana's settlers and the local tribes. Other factors lead to the increased pressure for removal. New roads and canals passed through Indian lands within Indiana, providing easier access to settlement in northern Indiana. White settlers also argued that the native tribes had rejected earlier efforts to adapt to "civilized society", and suggested that removal west would allow them to progress on their own timetable, away from some of the more negative changes in their lives, most notably the consumption of liquor.

Organized efforts began to remove the native tribes from the state in 1832. In July the Indian Services Bureau of the state was reorganized. Funds were appropriated to hold negotiations with tribal leaders and offer inducements for them to leave Indiana for lands in the West. The rising tensions following the Black Hawk War had also caused alarm among the tribes. By the 1830s white settlers far outnumbered the native tribes still living in Indiana. Some, but not all of the tribal leaders thought resistance would be futile and encouraged their people to accept the best deal for their lands while they were still in a position to negotiate. Other tribes did not want to leave their lands in Indiana and refused to cooperate.

Not everyone in Indiana wanted the Native Americans to leave, but most of their reasons served economic interests. Towns near the reservation lands depended on increased tribes' annual annuities as an ongoing source of revenue, especially the Indian traders. A few of the traders were also land speculators, who purchased the ceded Indian lands from the federal government and sold them to pioneer settlers, amassing considerable profits for their efforts. In addition, land cession treaties often included provisions for payment of claims on Indian debts to the traders.

In theory removals were supposed to be voluntary, but negotiators put considerable pressure on tribal leaders to accept relocation agreements. The Congress, under President Andrew Jackson's administration, provided federal authority under the Indian Removal Act to negotiate with native tribes living in eastern states and offer territorial land west of the Mississippi River in exchange lands in the established states. In a series of treaties from 1832 to 1840, tribal leaders surrendered multiple tracts of land in Indiana to the federal government. According to Indian agent John Tipton, between five and six thousand Indian "tribesmen" were living in Indiana in 1831; approximately 1,200 of them were Miami and the remainder were Potawatomi. The Potawatomi held title to an estimated three million acres in north central and northwestern Indiana, while the Miami held the Big Miami Reserve, on thirty-four square miles near the Wabash River, and other smaller tracts that totaled more than nine thousand acres.

The Vermillion Kickapoo and some of the Potawatomi, who were under the leadership of Kennekuk, the Kickapoo Prophet, removed in 1832; the forced removal of the Potawatomi in what became known as the Potawatomi Trail of Death occurred in 1838; and the Miami ceded all but a small portion of their remaining land in Indiana in treaty negotiations made in 1838 and 1840. A small reservation of Miami land along the Mississinewa River, in southern Wabash County and northern Grant counties, and scattered allotments to individuals were their only lands that the Miami retained for their use after 1840.

=== Potawatomi ===
In the 1830s Indian agents began going through the Potawatomi communities in northern Indiana, offering annuities, goods, payment of tribal debts, and reservation land in the West, among other provisions, in exchange for their land in Indiana. Most of the Potawatomi accepted the terms, including the federal government's agreement to pay for the removal to their new homes. The same type of negotiations with tribes in other states achieved similar results.

The Treaty of Tippecanoe (1832), a series of three treaties negotiated with the Potawatomi in October 1832, ceded Indian land in Indiana, Illinois, and part of Michigan to the federal government, except for small reservation lands for tribal use and scattered allotments to individuals. Under these treaties the federal government acquired more than four million acres of Potawatomi land in northeastern Indiana in exchange for annuities worth $880,000, goods worth $247,000, and payment of tribal debts amounting to $111,879. The total aggregate value of these three treaties was more than $1.2 million (about thirty cents per acre). Fourteen treaties made in 1834, 1836, and in 1837 ceded additional tracts of Indiana land in exchange for payments in cash and goods that amounted to $105,440. The federal government also agreed to set aside reservation land west of the Mississippi River, in present-day Kansas and Missouri, and reduced the Potawatomi holdings in Indiana to a tract of reservation land along the Yellow River. In 1836 alone, the federal government negotiated nine additional treaties with the Potawatomi to cede the remaining Potawatomi land in Indiana. These treaties required the Potawatomi to leave Indiana within two years.

The Treaty of Yellow River (1836), one of Indiana's more contentious treaties, offered the Potawatomi $14,080 for two sections of Indiana land, but Chief Menominee and seventeen others refused to accept the terms of the sale. The Yellow River band of Potawatomi living near Twin Lakes, Indiana, led by Chief Menominee, refused to take part in the negotiations and did not recognize the treaty's authority over their band. Under the terms of treaties made in 1836, the Potawatomi were required to vacate their land in Indiana within two years, including the Yellow River band. Menominee refused: "I have not signed any treaty, and will not sign any. I am not going to leave my land, and I do not want to hear anything more about it." Father Deseille, the Catholic missionary at Twin Lakes, also denounced the Yellow River Treaty (1836) as a fraud. Col. Pepper, the federal government's treaty negotiator, believed that Father Deseille was interfering with their plans for removal of the Potawatomi from Indiana, and ordered the priest to leave the mission at Twin Lakes or risk prosecution. The federal government refused Menominee's demands, and the chief and his band were forced to leave the state in 1838.

Indiana governor David Wallace authorized General John Tipton to forcefully remove the Potawatomi in what became known as the Potawatomi Trail of Death, the single largest Indian removal in the state. Beginning on September 4, 1838, a group of 859 Potawatomi were force marched from Twin Lakes to Osawatomie, Kansas. The difficult journey of about 660 miles (1,060 km), in hot, dry weather and without sufficient food or water, lead to the death of 42 people, 28 of them children.

Subsequent treaties with other Potawatomi tribes ceded additional lands in Indiana and removals continued. In a treaty made on September 23, 1836, the federal government agreed to purchase forty-two sections of their Indiana land for $33,600 (or $1.25 per acre, the minimum purchase price the government could receive from the sale of public lands). A treaty made with the Potawatomi on February 11, 1837, provided for further cessions of Indiana land in exchange for a parcel of reservation land for tribal members on the Osage River, southwest of the Missouri River in present-day Kansas, and other guarantees. Another small group of Potawatomi from Indiana removed in 1850. Those who had been forcefully removed were initially relocated to reservation land in eastern Kansas, but moved to another reservation in the Kansas River valley after 1846. Not all the Potawatomi from Indiana removed to Kansas. A small group joined an estimated 2,500 Potawatomi in Canada.

=== Miami ===
Under the terms of treaties negotiated in 1834, 1838, and 1840, the Miami ceded further land in Indiana to the federal government, including portions of the Big Miami Reserve along the Wabash River. In the treaty agreement made in 1838, the Miami ceded a large portion of Miami reservation land in Indiana for annuities, cash payments to tribal leaders Jean Baptiste Richardville and Francis Godfroy, payment of tribal debts, and other considerations. Under the terms of the Treaty of the Wabash (1840), another large tract of the Miami Reservation was ceded to the federal government for $550,000, including annuities, payment of tribal debts, and other provisions. The Miami also agreed to remove to lands secured for them west of the Mississippi River.

Allotment of lands to individuals made under the treaties with the Miami permitted some members of the tribe to remain on the land as private landholders under the terms of the Treaty of St. Mary's. Individuals also received additional land allotments in subsequent treaties. Allotments given to tribal leaders and others were intended to reinforce the European concept of land use, but they could also be interpreted as bribes. In five treaties negotiated with the Miami between 1818 and 1840, Jean Baptist Richardville received 44 quarter sections of Indiana land in separate allotments and Francis Godfroy received 17 sections.

The remaining Miami reservation land was ceded to the federal government in 1846. The major removal of the Miami from Indiana began on October 6, 1846. The group left Peru, Indiana, and traveled by canal boat and steamboat to reach their reservation lands in Kansas on November 9, 1846. Six deaths occurred along the way and 323 tribal members made it to the Kansas reservation. A small group removed in 1847. In all, less than one half of the Miami removed from Indiana. More than a half of the tribe either returned to Indiana from the West or were never required to leave under the terms of the treaties.

== After removal ==
Indian lands ceded to the federal government were sold to new owners–settlers and land speculators. More than three million acres of the ceded lands in Indiana were sold in 1836 alone. The financial panic of 1837 slowed the land rush, but it did not stop it. Squatters also hoped to claim a portion of the former Indian land. Under the provisions of the Preemption Act (1838), the squatters who were heads of families and single men aged twenty-one or older were allowed to claim up of up to 160 acres; the right was later extended to widows.

Native Americans remaining in Indiana after the 1840s eventually merged into the majority culture, although some retained ties to their Native American heritage. Some groups chose to live together in small communities, which continue to exist. In the late nineteenth and early twentieth century other Native American groups migrated to Indiana, a large portion of them were Cherokee. The Miami Nation of Indiana is concentrated along the Wabash River. Other Native Americans settled in Indiana's urban centers, such as Indianapolis, Elkhart, Fort Wayne, and Evansville. The state's population in 2000 included more than 39,000 Native Americans from more than 150 tribes.

== See also ==
- History of Indiana
- List of treaties between the Potawatomi and the United States.
- Trail of Death
