= Battle of Fort Recovery =

1794 battle of the Northwest Indian War

Coordinates: 40°24′54″N 84°46′53″W

- Part of the Northwest Indian War
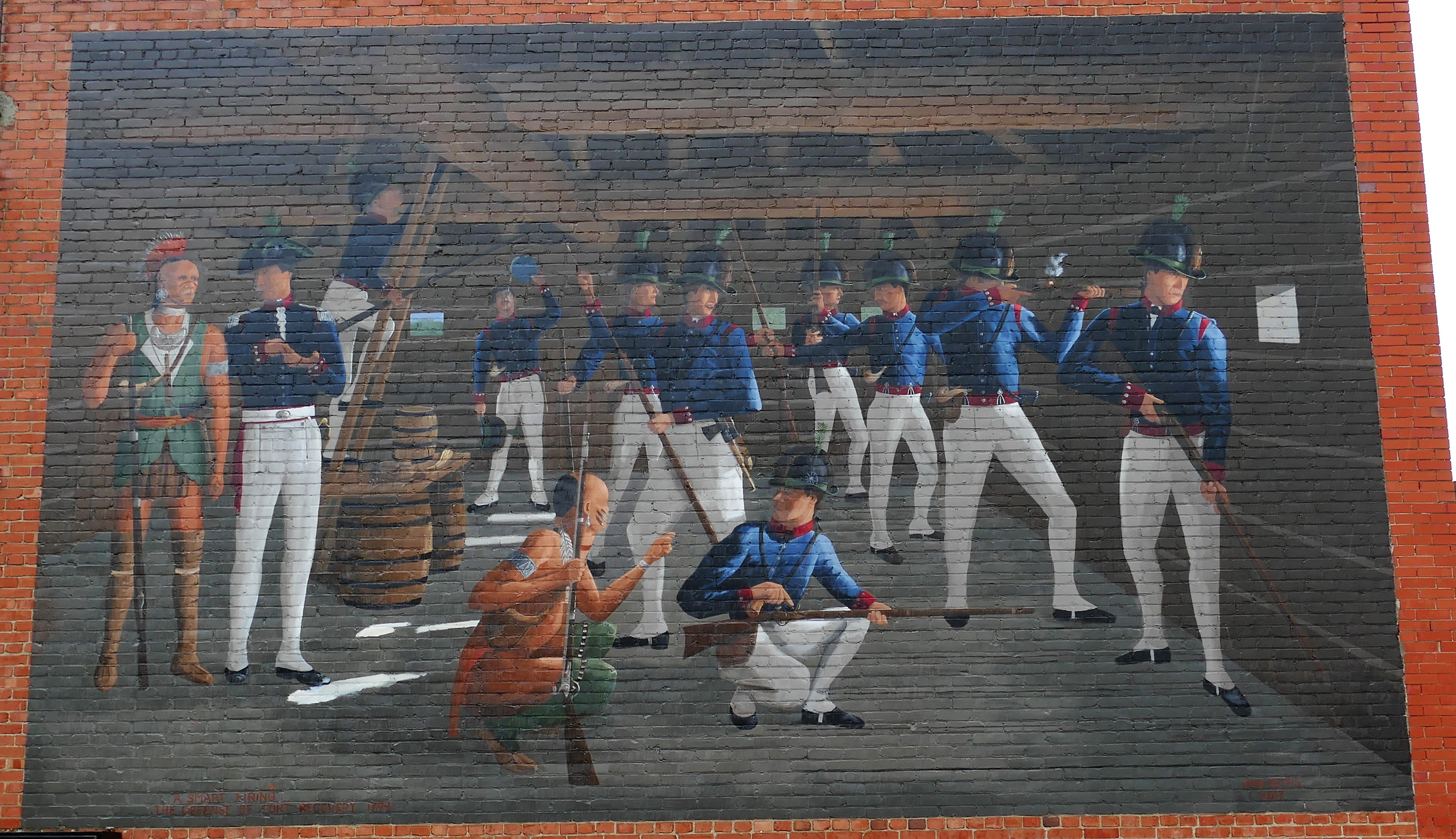
- Mural depicting the siege
Date	30 June 1794
Location	Fort Recovery, Ohio
Result	American victory

Belligerents
United States; Chickasaw; Choctaw	Northwestern Confederacy; Lower Canada

Commanders and leaders
William McMahon †; Asa Hartshorn †	Egushawa; Blue Jacket; Matthew Elliott

Strength
~250	~1,200

Casualties and losses
35 killed 43 wounded 20 missing	~17–50 killed ~100 wounded
- Location within Ohio

The Battle of Fort Recovery, 30 June – 1 July 1794, was a battle of the Northwest Indian War, fought at the present-day village of Fort Recovery, Ohio. A large force of warriors in the Western Confederacy attacked a fort held by United States soldiers deep in Ohio Country. The United States suffered heavy losses, but maintained control of the fort. The battle exposed a division in the Western Confederacy's military strategy at a time when they seemed to hold the advantage, and the United States pressed farther into the Northwest Territory.

== Background ==
At the end of the American Revolutionary War, Great Britain ceded control to the United States the territories northwest of the Ohio River and south of the Great Lakes. The United States wanted to capitalize on the lands to pay debts, but the Western Confederacy of Native American nations united to maintain the border with the United States at the Ohio River. This initiated the Northwest Indian War. In St. Clair's Defeat of 1791, United States forces were decisively defeated by a combined army of Delaware, Miami, and Shawnee warriors. In response, the nascent United States created a large professional army, called the Legion of the United States. The Legion's commander, Major General Anthony Wayne, ordered construction of a series of forts to secure the supply route north from Fort Washington. He deliberately ordered Fort Recovery to be built on the grounds of St. Clair's 1791 defeat. In January 1794, Wayne reported to Secretary of War Henry Knox that 8 companies and a detachment of artillery under Major Henry Burbeck had claimed St. Clair's battleground and had already built a small fort. By June 1794, Fort Recovery had been reinforced by a detachment of 250 soldiers, and the Legion had recovered four copper cannons (two six-pound and two three-pound), two copper howitzers, and one iron carronade from St. Clair's defeat in 1791.

That same month, a large gathering of the Western Confederacy departed their encampments on the Auglaize River. They were acting on news that the British could soon be at war with the United States, and Blue Jacket took the opportunity to secure the support of British agents and traders in the region. Blue Jacket was convinced that another decisive battle would secure a final victory in the war, and he gained support from the Shawnee, Odawa, Potawatomi, Lenape, and Ojibwe. The Miami war chief Little Turtle did not want to engage the Legion without artillery, and dissuaded most of the Miami from joining this expedition. Blue Jacket did not intend to strike Fort Recovery specifically, using scouts to locate the best opportunity. By 25 June, the combined force had encamped within 20 miles of Fort Recovery, and moved towards the fort in a mass formation that was so large that the warriors outnumbered the available firearms. This army hunted as it traveled, using up available ammunition along the way.

Reconnaissance patrols were sent to find the locations of United States forces. On 27 June, a scout detachment of Odawas and Ojibwe met a U.S. detachment of Choctaws and rangers from the Legion. Captain Bobb Sallad of the rangers was killed, while the rest escaped. They arrived at Fort Greenville the next day and reported a "great force" of Native Americans advancing with "a great number of white men." Wayne received a follow-up report that a large hostile force was about to attack the Legion's supply lines, and that Fort Recovery had only three days of provisions.

On 28 June, the confederation force encamped along the road between Fort Recovery and Fort Greenville. Here a debate arose on their next move. Blue Jacket wanted to attack the Legion's road south of Fort Greenville, cutting off supplies and reinforcements to the Legion's forts. Reconnaissance had noted movement near Fort Recovery, however, and the majority argued that it would be easier to attack the fort at the farthest reaches of the supply line. According to William Wells, the head of the Legion's reconnaissance companies, the entire Native American army was placed under the nominal command of Odawa leader Egushawa, perhaps due to the large numbers of northern tribes who had journeyed south to join the campaign. (Note: Of the 1,200 confederacy warriors who attacked Fort Recovery, about 800 were Odawa and Ojibwa. These northern nations also suffered the most significant casualties. Sword, pp. 277–78.) An estimated 1,200 warriors of the confederacy encamped just south of Fort Recovery and prepared an ambush.

== Battle ==
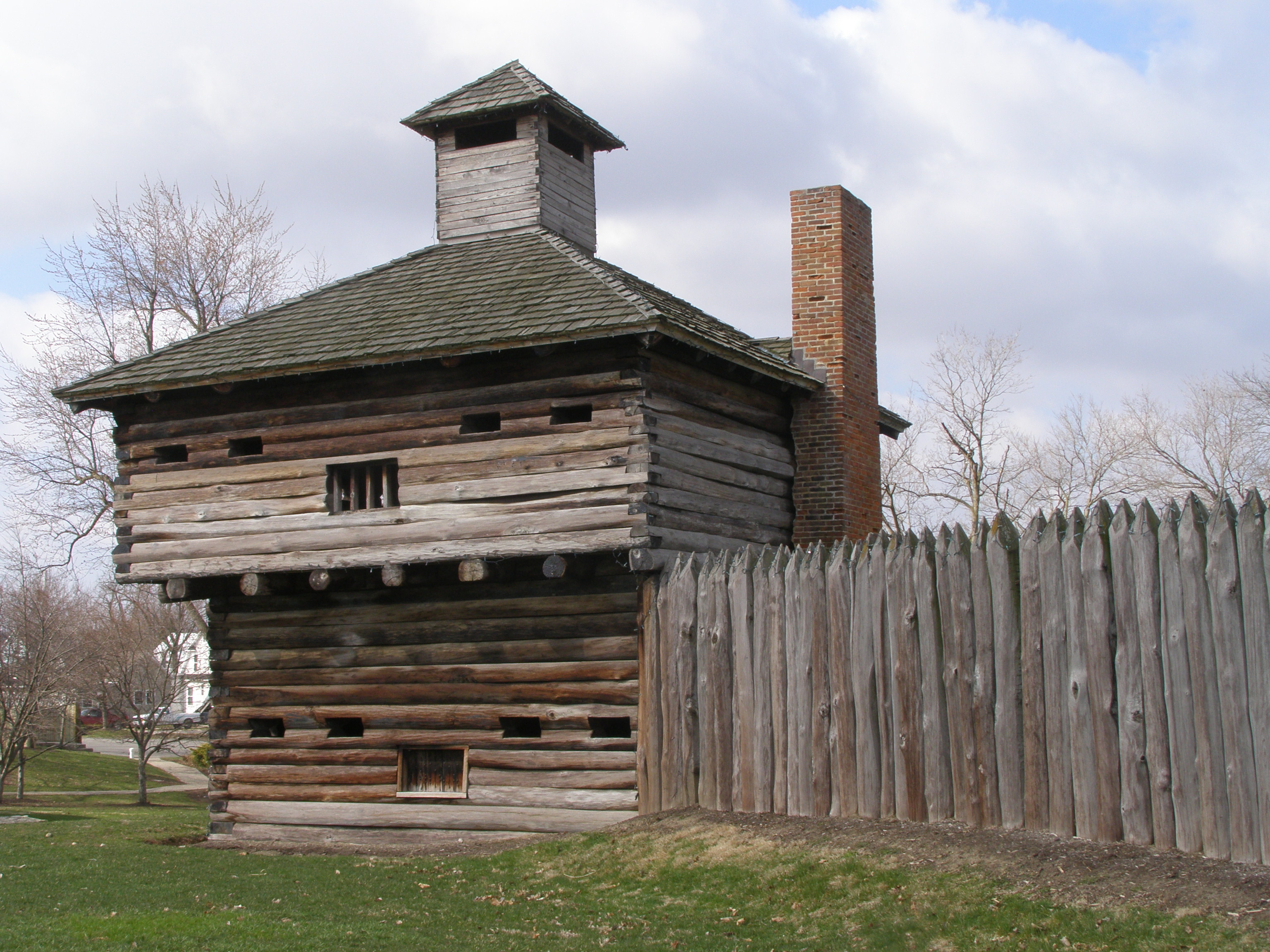
Reconstructed blockhouse at Fort Recovery, Ohio

Early on 30 June, a company of Choctaws and Chickasaws arrived at Fort Recovery, headed by Chickasaw leader Jimmy Underwood. Although Underwood could not speak English, he was able to communicate a large enemy presence and many shots fired. Captain Gibson sent a reconnaissance patrol around Fort Recovery, but finding nothing abnormal, the fort resumed normal operations and the farm animals were released to graze freely.

Later that morning, a supply column left Fort Recovery for Fort Greenville, while the security detail finished breakfast at the fort. The column had gone about a quarter-mile when a small party of confederate warriors attacked the supply column and drove them back to the fort, while the rest of the army remained in position. At the sounds of gunfire and fleeing herd animals, the fort quickly sent a reaction force of dragoons along the road and riflemen in the woods. The main body of the confederate force waited until the dragoons were at close range, then fired a mass volley which killed several of the dragoons and horses, including the officer in charge, Major William McMahon. The riflemen under Captain Asa Hartshorn were flanked by small parties and cut off from the fort, then attacked by the main body of confederate warriors. An injured Hartshorn was confronted by Thomas McKee, who demanded his surrender. Captain Hartshorn swung his pike at McKee and was quickly killed by McKee's slave and a Native American warrior.

Captain Gibson sent a detachment under LT Drake to cover the retreat to the fort. They advanced to the edge of the forest with bayonets and momentarily slowed the confederacy's advance, but were soon forced to retreat. LT Drake had to be dragged back to the fort after being shot.

The Legion's dragoons cut a retreat back to the fort, losing thirty-two killed (including Cornet Daniel Torrey) and thirty wounded, while inflicting an unknown number of casualties on their attackers. Some of the dragoons took shelter at a detached blockhouse by a stream, but most were forced to retreat again to the main fort. Many confederate warriors tried to capture the horses during the dragoon's retreat. The blockhouse itself remained under Corporal White and 6 privates, who may have killed more confederate warriors than the rest of the Legion inside the main fort. The Native Americans captured or scattered several hundred pack horses used for supply convoys.

The combined Native American force had only suffered 3 killed in the coordinated ambush, but Odawa and Ojibwa forces attacked the fort directly. A party of British officers under Captain Matthew Elliott argued against the attack, since they had already inflicted great damage on the Legion but had little chance of success against the fort. The attack was quickly neutralized by defenders from within the safety of the fort, including infantry, dragoons, and Chickasaw scouts. Captain Gibson also brought up the recovered artillery to defend the fort. The cannons did not seem to have a significant direct effect on the confederate force, but caused some warriors to flee. The confederate force refused to retreat, however, forcing the fort to remain closed while a British artillery crew searched for the cannons buried after St. Clair's defeat in 1791. Blue Jacket had no choice but to support the futile attack, which lasted until nightfall.

Chickasaw and Choctaw scouts managed to get behind the confederate line and shoot some Ojibwe and Odawa warriors in the back. This spawned accusations by the northern nations that they had been fired upon by rival Shawnee. (Note: A rumor had already spread that some late-arriving Odawa reinforcements had harassed Shawnee women at Grand Glaize. Sword, p. 278) The scouts also observed a crowd of commanders, which included at least three British officers in red uniforms, a large number of white men, and Simon Girty. One officer, Captain Jean Baptiste Beaubien, was seen near the wood line just out of musket range. A Chickasaw rifleman finally shot him with a double charge of powder; he was carried into the forest but later died.

Inflicting few casualties while taking on many, the confederacy decided to retire to the forest. That night, they attempted a surprise attack on the fort. It lasted nearly two hours, but accomplished little. Shots continued through the night, as soldiers from within the fort fired upon Native Americans who were gathering their dead and wounded. During the night, a scouting company under Captain William Wells reported that there were British officers behind the Indian lines, and that they had brought powder and cannonballs, but no cannons. They were looking for U.S. cannons that had been buried after St. Clair's defeat, not knowing that these had already been recovered by the Legion of the United States. The British officers recovered one cannon, but were unable to utilize it; one later stated that "had we two barrels of powder, Fort Recovery would have been in our possession with the help of St. Clair's cannon."

The next day, 1 July, some among the confederate forces attacked the fort again. They began to withdraw by noon, and they were gone by nightfall.

== Aftermath ==
On 2 July, Captain Gibson sent burial details. They were fired on by a few remaining Native Americans, but the two sides did little more than exchange angry words from a distance. Captain Gibson counted 35 dead, 43 wounded, 20 captured or missing. In addition, 46 horses were killed and 9 wounded, while the confederacy captured 204 horses and 30 cattle. Wayne sent an emergency resupply train to the fort, fearful that the confederacy may regroup. Wayne finally arrived at Fort Recovery a month later, calling the garrison the "bravest boys in the world."

Estimates of confederate casualties varied significantly, from 17 in earlier reports to an inflated number of 130 in later reports. William Wells concluded over the years that between 40-50 had died, and nearly 100 wounded, some of whom later died. The leaders of the Western Confederacy were sharply divided after the battle. The Odawa accused Blue Jacket of cowardice for not fully supporting the direct assault on Fort Recovery. Blue Jacket was angry that his plan to attack Fort Greenville was rejected, and that the Odawa had directly attacked Fort Recovery after their initial success. The Odawa and Ojibwa departed for their homes to bury their dead, determined that they had done their part for the Confederacy.

British MAJ William Campbell, commandant of Fort Miami, requested reinforcements when he received word of the battle. Governor John Graves Simcoe received the report and wrote on 10 July "I conceive war inevitable." Little Turtle identified Wayne as a "black snake who never sleeps", and insisted that the British provide 20 soldiers and 2 cannons for a renewed attack on Fort Recovery. When the commandant of Detroit, COL Richard England declined to promise this support, Little Turtle warned him that they could not continue to resist Wayne's Legion.

Because the fort remained secure, Wayne's army was able to advance north and extend the line of forts. Fort Defiance was built in August, and became the Legion's main staging ground before it met and defeated a combined force under Blue Jacket at the Battle of Fallen Timbers. The following year, representatives from the Western Confederacy and the United States met to negotiate the Treaty of Greenville. This treaty ceded most of the modern state of Ohio to the United States, and used Fort Recovery as a landmark to draw the boundary with Native American lands.

Tecumseh was among the Shawnee at Fort Recovery. He would later fight at Fallen Timbers and would form a new pan-tribal confederation in 1808.
