= Asa Hartshorne =

United States Army officer (died 1794)

- Born: Franklin, Connecticut
- Died: 30 June 1794; Fort Recovery, Ohio
- Military career
- Allegiance: United States
- Branch: Army
- Service years: 1787 – 1794
- Rank: Captain
- Units: First American Regiment, Legion of the United States
- Conflicts: Hartshorne's Defeat, Hardin's Defeat; Siege of Fort Recovery †

Signature
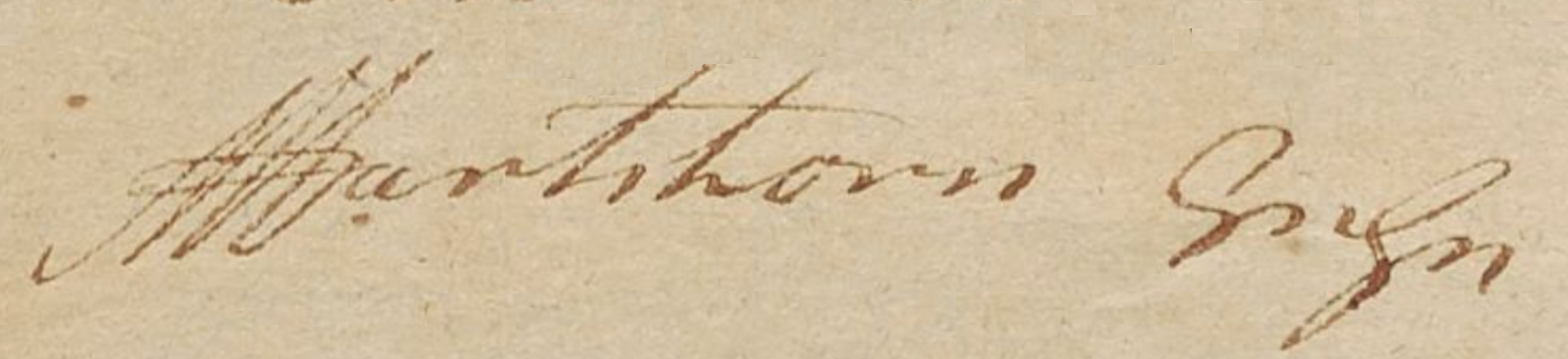

Asa Hartshorne was a United States Army officer who died in 1794 during the Northwest Indian War. He was among the signers of the Treaty with the Six Nations and the Treaty with the Wyandot at Fort Harmar on January 9, 1789. Hartshorne became the namesake of a 1790 frontier skirmish near Maysville, Kentucky.

== Biography ==
Hartshorne was born in Franklin, Connecticut Connecticut and joined the Army in 1787.

As an ensign in the First American Regiment, he signed the 1789 Treaty of Fort Harmar

He traveled west from Fort Harmar that August, along with his fellow junior officer Jacob Kingsbury, under the command of Captain David Strong. On 30 May 1790, Hartshorne commanded a party near Limestone, Kentucky, that was attacked in retaliation for an attack on the Shawnee village of Chalawgatha by Charles Scott a month earlier. Hartshorne reported 8 people missing after the attack and 5 killed, including 3 children. This frontier skirmish is known as "Hartshorne's Defeat (1790)."

While stationed in Fort Washington at Cincinnati, Ohio, Hartshorne participated in the Harmar campaign, an assault on Native American villages deep in Ohio Territory. He and Captain John Armstrong were the only two active duty Army officers to survive when a force under Kentucky colonel John Hardin approached the Miami village of Little Turtle on 19 October 1790.

Hartshorne was promoted to lieutenant on 4 March 1791 and returned to Connecticut to recruit for the newly-formed Second American Regiment.

Hartshorne was promoted to captain in the 1st Sub-Legion on 1 September 1792.

In January 1794, shortly after the construction of Fort Recovery, Hartshorne was tasked with building a road north to the village of Simon Girty. He was killed on 30 June 1794 during the Siege of Fort Recovery, when he refused to surrender to Thomas McKee. When his body was recovered the following day, it had been mutilated. However, two leather hearts had been placed in his chest as a testament to his courage. Lieut. Thomas T. Underwood made the following entry in his journal regarding the death of Hartshorne:

Capt. Hartshorn was badly wounded the commencement of the action, two of his soldiers tryed to get him to the Garrison, and got him in sixty yards of the Garrison, they were so close parsued the Capt. told the soldiers to lay him down and save themselves, as they laid him down he handed his watch to one of the men. As they left him he said to them boys save yourselves.

== Recognition ==
Christopher W. Wingate in Military Professionalism and the Early American Officer Corps, 1789-1796 (2013) wrote:

Captain Thomas T. Underwood’s journal recounts the representative bravery of Captain Asa Hartshorne during a 1794 attack on Fort Recovery. When a surprise attack by Miami warriors against a convoy resupplying the fort threatened the caravan escorts, Hartshorne rode out of the fort at the head of a small relief party. Hartshorne’s detachment relieved their comrades, driving the Indians into the woods. In the aftermath of this charge however, Indians surrounded and wounded him badly. Ordering his detachment to leave him and escape to the relative safety of the fort’s walls, Hartshorne died, sacrificing himself for the survival of his comrades.
