= William Campbell (British Army officer, died 1796) =

Lieutenant-Colonel William Campbell (died 2 December 1796) was a British Army officer and colonial administrator who served as the governor of Bermuda in 1796. During the Northwest Indian War, Campbell, then a major in the 24th Regiment of Foot, was the commandant of Fort Miami in the disputed Northwest Territory. Following the 1794 Battle of Fallen Timbers, warriors of the Northwestern Confederacy attempted to regroup at the fort, but Campbell refused to let them enter to avoid starting a war with the United States. American Major-general Anthony Wayne, who had led the Legion of the United States to victory in the battle, unsuccessfully attempted to provoke Campbell into attacking his forces; Fort Miami was eventually handed over to the US in 1796 under the Jay Treaty. Having been appointed governor of Bermuda, Campbell arrived at Bermuda on 22 November 1796, but then died on 2 December and was buried at St. Peter's Church, St. George's.
