= Legion of the United States =

Reorganization of the United States Army from 1792 to 1796

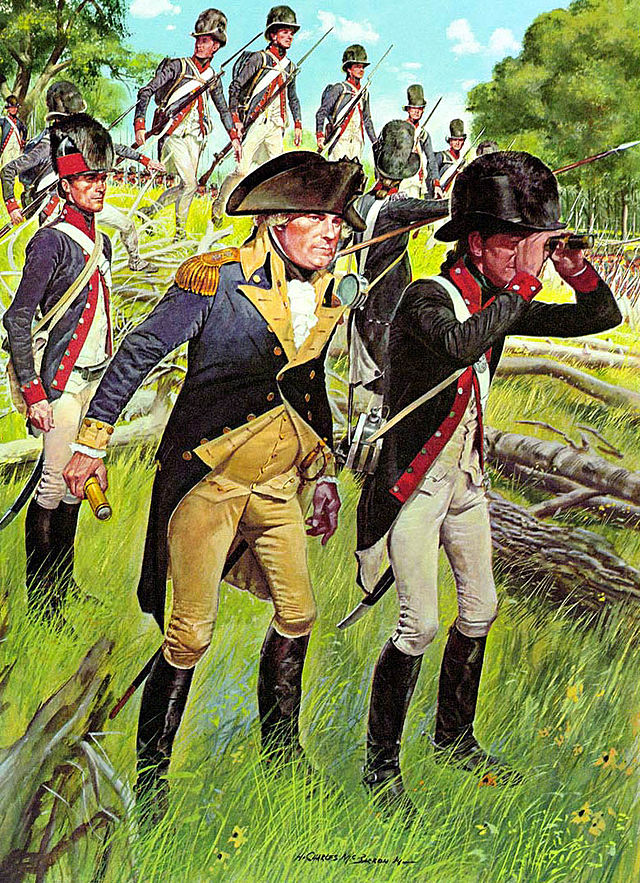
- Major General Anthony Wayne with the Legion of the United States, 1794
- Active: 1792–1796
- Disbanded: 1796
- Country: United States of America
- Branch: United States Army
- Type: Combined arms
- Role: Pacify Native-American tribes, secure western border for settlement
- Size: 2,631
- Colors: Unit Colors: 1st Sub-Legion: white and black; 2nd Sub-Legion: red and white; 3rd Sub-Legion: black and yellow; 4th Sub-Legion: green and white
- Engagements: Northwest Indian War: Siege of Fort Jefferson; Siege of Fort Recovery; Battle of Fallen Timbers

Commanders
- First Commander: Major General Anthony Wayne
- Second Commander: Brigadier General James Wilkinson

The Legion of the United States was a reorganization and extension of the United States Army from 1792 to 1796 under the command of Major General Anthony Wayne. It represented a political shift in the new United States, which had recently adopted the United States Constitution. The new Congressional and Executive branches authorized a standing army composed of professional soldiers rather than relying on state militias.

The Legion was primarily formed in reaction to multiple defeats in the Ohio country in 1790 and 1791 and to assert U.S. sovereignty over U.S. borders in the western territories and Great Lakes regions. The Legion comprised four sub-legions, each with infantry, cavalry, riflemen, and artillery. The Legion is best known for its victory at the Battle of Fallen Timbers in August 1794. Following the 1795 Treaty of Greenville with the Western Confederacy of Native American nations and the Jay Treaty with Great Britain, the Legion was reduced in size and rechristened the Army of the United States in 1796.

The modern 1st, 3rd, and 4th United States Infantry Regiments of the United States Army trace their lineage to the Legion of the United States.

== Origins ==
After the American Revolutionary War in 1783, Congress decided to disband the Continental Army. By 1784, all Continental Army regiments had been disbanded, and the new United States Army consisted of two detachments to guard military supplies. By 1785, however, a cash-strapped Congress authorized 700 recruits to form the First American Regiment, which served in the Western territories, both to expel illegal settlers and to protect those who had purchased their lands from the United States. Many in the nascent United States still feared a standing army at this time, so the U.S. relied primarily on volunteer state militias.

A new government under the United States Constitution created the Department of War in 1789 and named Henry Knox as the first secretary. While Knox worked to organize the new department, he ordered the First American Regiment commander, Lieutenant Colonel Josiah Harmar, to lead an offensive against "banditti" Native Americans in the Northwest Territory. Harmar's force consisted of about 300 federal regulars and 1,000 militia, and suffered from a lack of equipment and provisions. The Harmar Campaign departed Fort Washington in September 1790 and marched to Kekionga, where they were defeated with heavy losses.

Washington ordered a follow-up expedition led by territorial governor, General Arthur St. Clair. His initial force was roughly the same size as Harmar's, so Congress authorized a second infantry regiment of 2,000 soldiers, but only for six months. St. Clair's total force was only 2,400, and he could not overcome logistics problems, but with the six-month levies expiring, he set out in September 1791. This newly recruited and inexperienced force was attacked in camp on the morning of 4 November 1791 by forces of the Western Confederacy led by Little Turtle and Blue Jacket. St. Clair's defeat remains one of the worst in U.S. Army history, with over half of St. Clair's combined force killed or wounded. Three-quarters of the new Second Infantry Regiment, including their commander Richard Butler, were lost, as was all artillery.

The defeat of Harmar and St. Clair caused a shift in thinking. Congress recognized that it needed a more significant, professional army, and authorized a federal force strength of 5,190. President George Washington drafted a list of sixteen general officers from the American Revolutionary War to lead an expanded Army in the Northwest, including Benjamin Lincoln, Daniel Morgan, and Friedrich Wilhelm von Steuben. After consulting with his cabinet, he picked Anthony Wayne to lead the new professional army, although Washington initially considered him too vain. Influenced by treatises from both Henry Bouquet and General Friedrich Wilhelm von Steuben, and at the recommendation of Secretary of War Henry Knox and General von Steuben, it was decided to recruit and train a "Legion", a force that would combine all land combat arms of the day (cavalry, heavy and light infantry, artillery) into one efficient brigade-sized force divisible into stand-alone combined arms teams. Congress agreed with this proposal to augment the small standing army until "the United States shall be at peace with the Indian tribes." Congress also passed the Militia Acts of 1792, giving President Washington authority over state militias in a national emergency.

== The Legion ==
=== Organization and structure ===
The Legion was formed from the remnants of the First and Second Regiments and filled with recruits. Recruiting was difficult following the military disasters of 1790 and 1791; though over 4,000 troops were to be enlisted, only 2,631 served in the legion. From June 1792 to November 1792, the Legion remained in cantonment at Fort LaFayette in Pittsburgh. It was composed of four sub-legions; each was originally authorized a brigadier general, but was commanded by a lieutenant colonel. These sub-legions were self-contained units with two battalions of infantry, a rifle battalion (light infantry skirmishers armed with Pennsylvania long rifles to screen the infantry), and a troop of Light Dragoons. The Army had previously raised four companies of artillery under battalion commander Major Henry Burbeck; each company was attached to one sub-legion. Each sub-legion was also authorized to have their own medical personnel. In that the sub-legions were composed of different unit types, some have compared them to modern combined arms organisation, thereby viewing them as remote forerunners to the Brigade Combat Teams of the modern United States Army.

Major General Wayne commanded the entire legion, with Brigadier General Wilkinson acting as a second-in-command. Under Wayne's command was the 1st sub-legion commanded by Jean François Hamtramck, the 2nd sub-legion commanded by David Strong and the 3rd sub-legion commanded by Henry Gaither, and the 4th sub-legion, which was first commanded by Jonathan Clark, and then by Thomas Butler from 1 July 1794 to 1 November 1796.

=== Uniforms ===
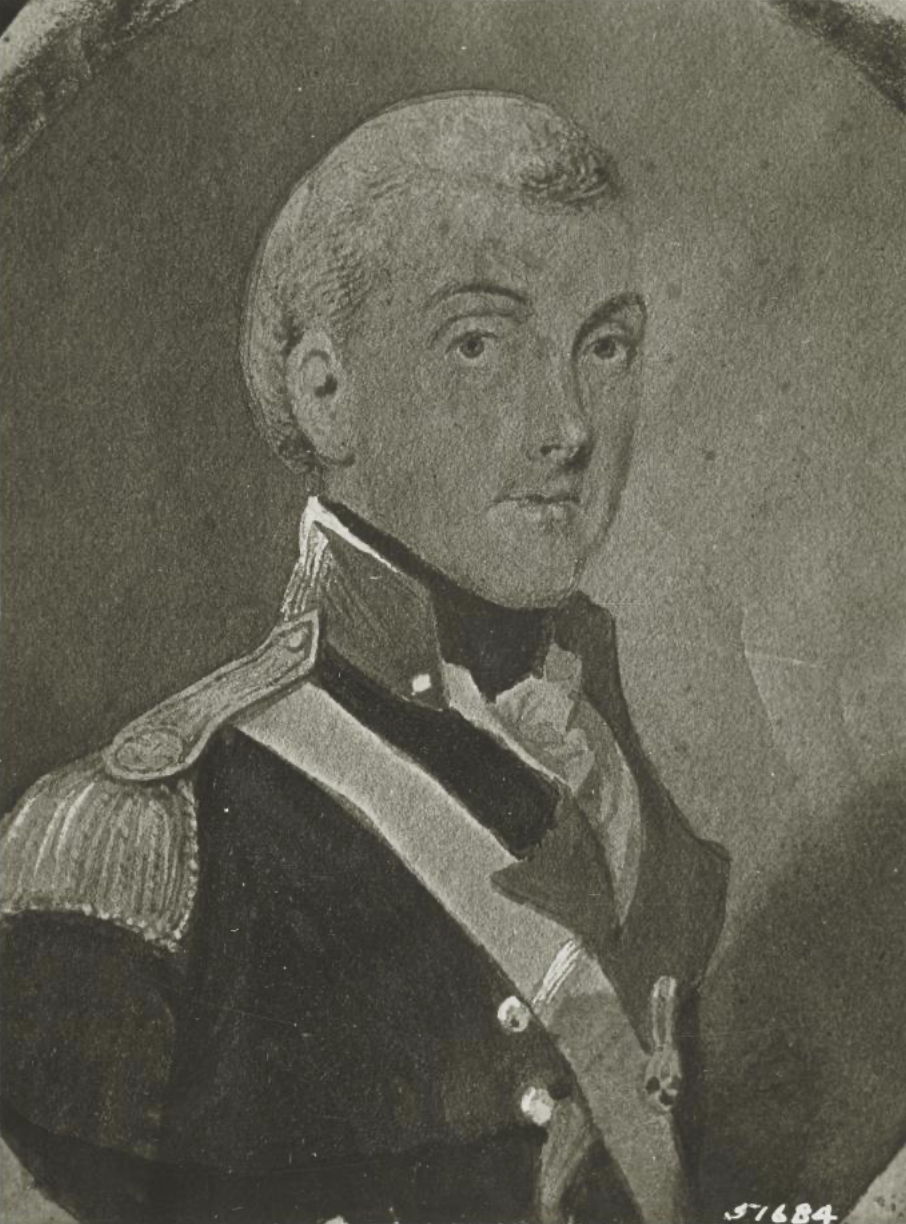
Bezaleel Howe, a major in the 4th Sub-Legion.

General Wayne insisted that each sub-legion have a distinctive cap. The 1st sub-legion wore a cap of black hair with white binding and plumes, the 2nd wore a cap of white hair with red binding and plumes, the 3rd wore a cap of black hair with yellow binding and plumes, and the 4th wore a cap of white hair with green binding and plumes. Each sub-legion also carried a regimental standard with their unit colors:

- 1st Sub-Legion: White and Black
- 2nd Sub-Legion: Red and White
- 3rd Sub-Legion: Black and Yellow
- 4th Sub-Legion: Green and White

By 10 March 1794 Wayne altered the caps to round hats with bearskin crests, although the sub-legions retained their distinctive binding and plume colors.

Officers wore cocked hats with no distinctive marks except for the plumes of their respective sub-legions. However, previous battles had shown that Native Americans would target officers, so Wayne ordered his officers to wear the caps as the enlisted men in actual service or action. Officers also commonly buttoned their coats across the chest.

Appearance was emphasized. Soldiers could receive 20 lashes for a dirty uniform, and soldiers on guard duty had to be clean-shaven with powdered hair.

=== Capabilities ===
Commissioned officers, non-commissioned officers, and enlisted personnel were trained to fight in separate small units. General Wayne's tactics were to fire and move quickly with the light infantry as his front-line forces supported by heavy infantry. Additionally, the Legion was taught to move quickly on the enemy so they could not reload, then attack with bayonets. The infantry were armed with smoothbore muskets from the Revolutionary War, mostly 1763 or 1777 models of the Charleville musket. They were trained to fire a paper cartridge consisting of "one ball and three heavy buckshot," and to aim at the waistband to maximize lethality. Wayne even experimented with the touchholes of the muskets to allow fine powder to fall from the breech and fill the pan, allowing his soldiers to reload faster. These were issued to the 200 soldiers of the light infantry, which Wayne called "improved infantry," who were taught to take careful aim at individual targets. By contrast, regular infantry were trained to form in open order and merely point their weapons towards their enemies to maneuver and fire more quickly. Wayne requested copies of General von Steuben's Regulations for the Order and Discipline of the Troops of the United States, which was out of print; he complained that officers from the Revolution were "rather rusty."

The Legion's 360 riflemen were organized into six companies; two companies were placed at the front and rear of the Legion, and two companies each were assigned to the 3rd and 4th sub-legions to guard the Legion's left and right. Wayne required soldiers to be able to hit targets at 200 yards before they could be assigned to a rifle company. They were armed with varieties of the long rifle, and dismounted officers were issued light muskets. To mitigate the lack of bayonets on rifles, they were also issued bayonet-tipped sticks, which could be unfolded and locked to form spears.

The artillery consisted of 120 soldiers and 16 guns. Since their artillery slowed St. Clair's campaign, Wayne insisted that heavy canons be left at Fort Washington. Instead, he ordered 2.75 and 2.85 caliber howitzers that could be carried on horseback with special saddles. These guns could fire an iron ball, an explosive shell, or grapeshot against infantry at short range. Gun crews were trained to fire every 15 seconds. In addition, the Legion recovered artillery lost at St. Clair's defeat and used these guns at Fort Recovery.

A squadron of light dragoons, consisting of about 200 soldiers organized into four troops, was authorized for the Legion. The four troops were labelled Bey Troop, Black Troop, Grey Troop, and Sorrell Troop, each with four squads of 15 horses and soldiers. The squadron was originally under the supervision of Major Michael Rudolph, an infantry officer from the 1st American Regiment. Rudolph resigned in July 1792; he was replaced by Major William Winston. They were armed with pistols and sabres, as well as Charleville carbines, although supplies could be scarce. When the squadron was ordered north to Fort Greenville, some troopers did not have boots, having had to relinquish them to infantry soldiers who had previously departed. They had to guard their horses carefully, which were prized in the frontier wilderness.

Nearly 1,500 mounted Kentucky militia augmented the Legion's campaign into Ohio territory. Although organized into formal militias, Wayne preferred to use them as auxiliaries to the dragoons. The militias were not issued uniforms and performed more as mounted infantry than dragoons or cavalry. They were armed with rifles and carried only knives or tomahawks for close combat. However, many of them had previous experience in the territory.

The Legion had a detachment of rangers under Captain George Shrim. This was an elite force primarily used for intelligence gathering. They were superseded by a new detachment of 90 scouts and spies organized into three companies under the command of Captain William Wells, a son-in-law of Miami war chief Little Turtle who unexpectedly joined the Legion. Wells reported directly to General Wayne. Additional scouting capabilities were added in May 1794 when Captain James Underwood arrived with 60 Chickasaw allies. James Robertson also arrived with 45 Choctaw warriors.

Junior officers and non-commissioned officers were issued espontoons and light muskets.

=== Locations ===
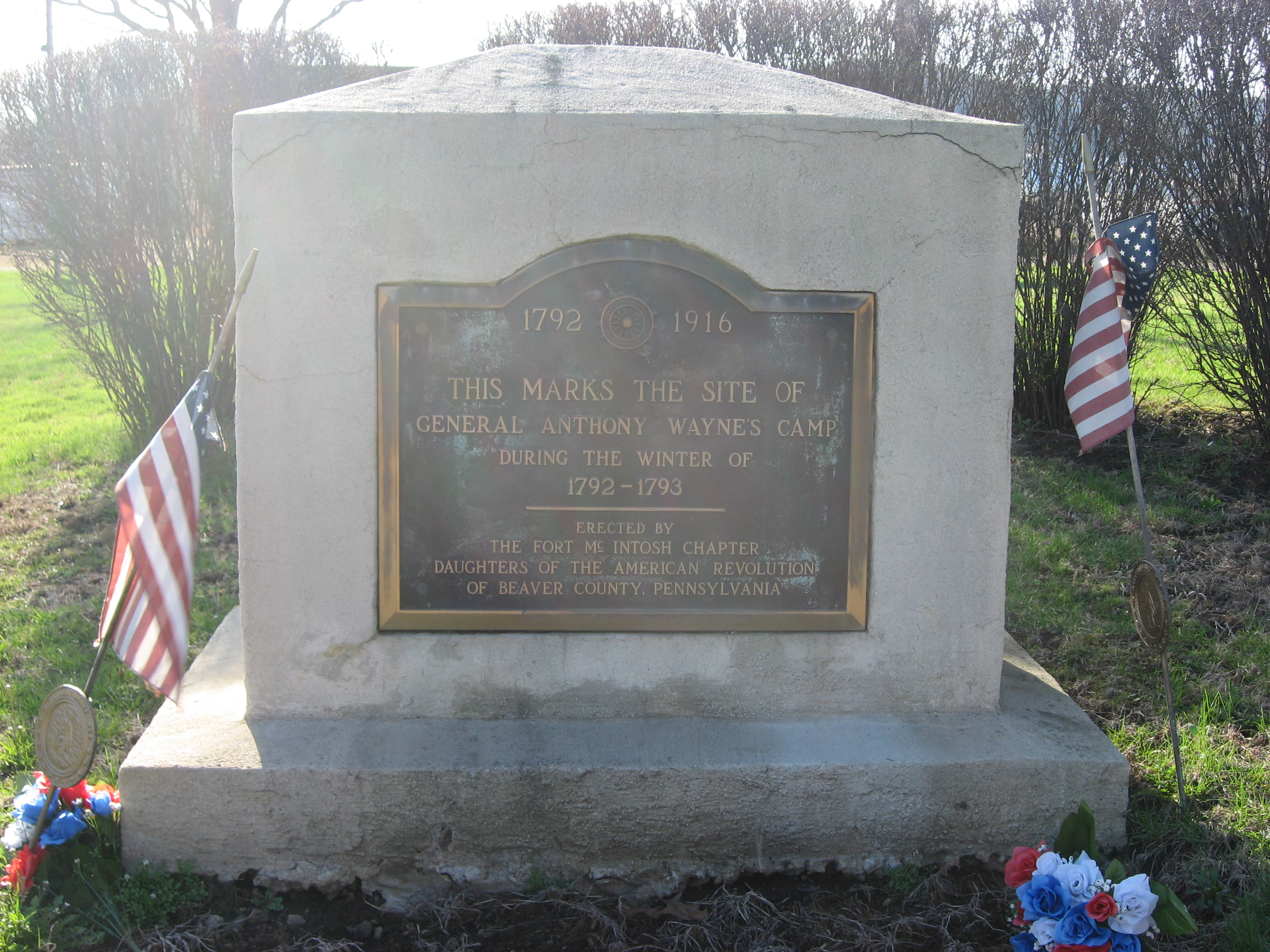
Monument at the site of Legionville

The Legion created the first training camp used by the United States Military, at Legionville in western Pennsylvania, on the banks of the Ohio River. This was created, in part, to escape the negative effect that Pittsburgh had on discipline. In autumn 1793, the Legion decamped by barge and advanced to the western Ohio frontier down the Ohio River to a camp near Fort Washington dubbed "Hobson's Choice." A month later, the Legion moved northward past the western outposts Fort Hamilton, Fort St. Clair, and Fort Jefferson into Native American territory and established Fort Greene Ville, where they were joined by units of the Kentucky Militia under Virginia Brigadier General Charles Scott. The Legion also occupied Fort Knox in the far western town of Vincennes.

As Wayne prepared to advance in 1794, Knox ordered him on 31 March to build and man a fortification on the site of Fort Massac. This was to prevent any action against Spain by the French Revolutionary Legion, a force under George Rogers Clark that was recruiting at the same time. Wayne sent an infantry company under Thomas Doyle and four artillery pieces to Fort Massac in May after receiving word that Spain had sent five gunboats up the Mississippi River as far as the Ohio River.

General Wayne extended his deliberate line of forts northward and garrisoned each with freshly trained legionaries to protect his soldiers and supply line. This chain of frontier forts eventually reached far north towards Lake Erie and closely resembles the modern border of Ohio and Indiana. It included more permanent garrisons such as Fort Recovery, which was built on the site of St. Clair's defeat, and Fort Defiance. It also included more temporary camps such as Fort Adams and Fort Deposit. Finally, Wayne had the Legion construct Fort Wayne to assert U.S. sovereignty over the large Native American city at Kekionga to the west in what would become the Indiana Territory and the state of Indiana. Following British withdrawal from the Northwest Territory, the Legion also occupied Fort Lernoult (Detroit). It constructed three supply/relay forts to secure the Great Miami to Maumee portage: Forts Loramie, Piqua, and St. Mary's.

== Campaign history ==
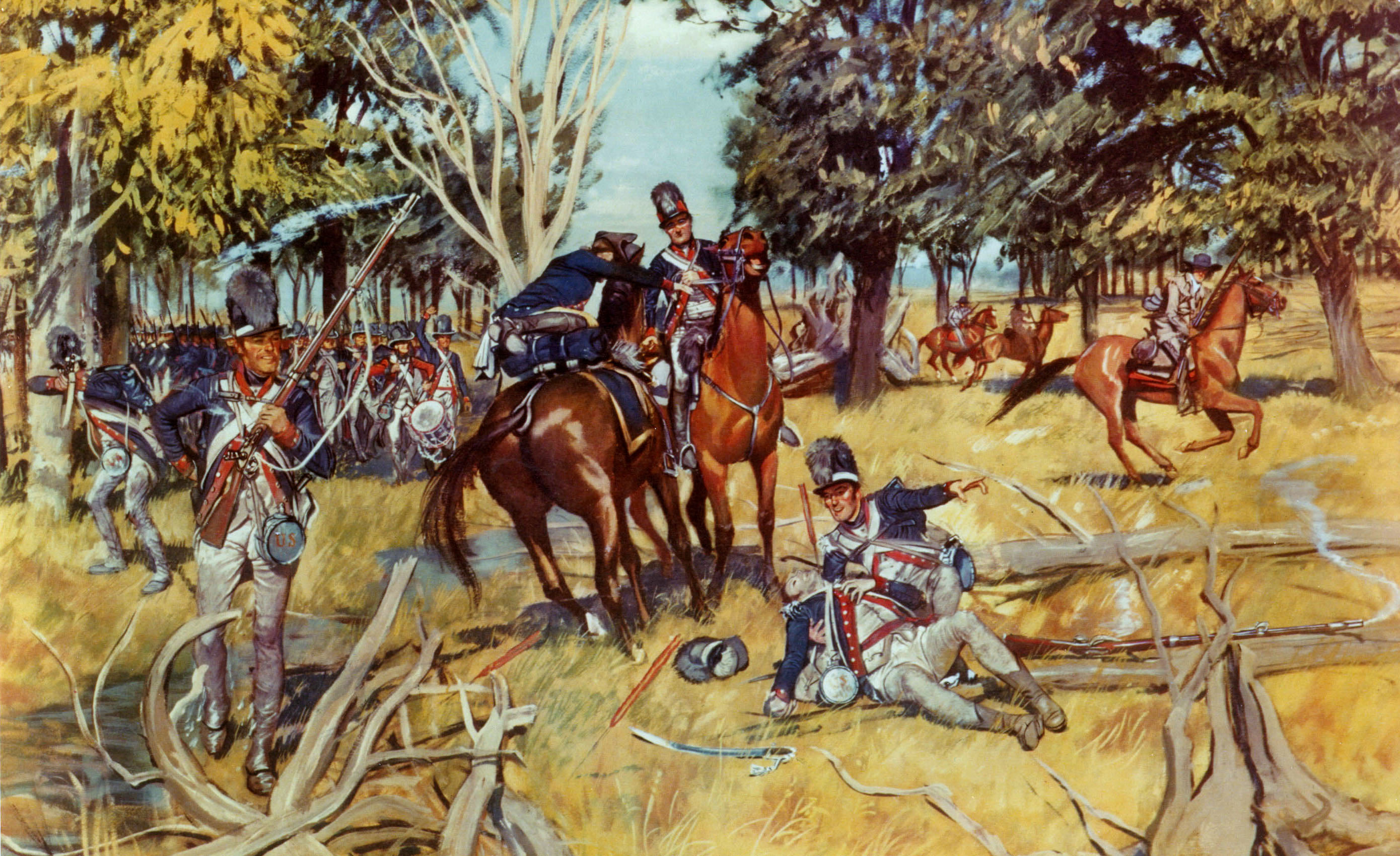
General Anthony Wayne and his Legion of the United States, depicted advancing along the Maumee River prior to the August 1794 Battle of Fallen Timbers

The Legion of the United States was engaged in several attacks on their convoys as the expedition pushed further into Native American strongholds, chiefly towards the Maumee Rapids. For three years, starting on 25 June 1792, Fort Jefferson, along with the Legion ammunition supply trains en route to the fort, were under constant siege by native forces. Major General Anthony Wayne deployed up to 500 soldiers to guard each supply convoy, with wide area security patrols and guards on the front, rear, and flanks. Anticipating war, the British constructed Fort Miami south of Lake Erie in the spring of 1794 and garrisoned it with 120 infantrymen and 8 cannon. Angered by this decision, Wayne reluctantly agreed to augment the Legion with Kentucky militia.

On 30 June 1794, just outside the gates of Fort Recovery, built on St. Clair's battlefield, a pack-horse convoy led by Major William Friend McMahon was attacked by 2,000 Native Americans. After Major McMahon was killed and the rest of the survivors fled to the protection within the fort, a full-scale attack was made on the fortification. Many of the approximately 125 soldiers defending the fort were expert riflemen, and Fort Recovery also had artillery. The battle lasted two days, but the Legion maintained control of the fort. Some scholars believe there were more native warriors involved in the attack of Fort Recovery than at the climactic Battle of Fallen Timbers.

The most notable engagement in which the Legion participated was the Battle of Fallen Timbers, southwest of present-day Toledo, Ohio, on 20 August 1794. By the time the Legion reached this area, it had less than half its authorized numbers, with many soldiers defending the supply trains and forts. Wayne reorganized the Legion into three wings. Wayne commanded the center and reserve, comprising 900 soldiers, including the dragoons and artillery. The left wing was commanded by Lieutenant Colonel Jean François Hamtramck and was formed from 450 soldiers of the 1st and 2nd sub-legions. The right wing was commanded by Brigadier General James Wilkinson and was formed from 450 soldiers of the 3rd and 4th sub-legions. Major General Charles Scott retained command of the Kentucky auxiliaries.

The Legion conducted a movement to contact and found an established ambush in a field of trees that had blown over in a storm (the "fallen timbers"). The Legion's front withdrew when attacked, but the troops closed quickly and pressed with the bayonet. The Native forces could not rally an attack and withdrew to nearby Fort Miami. Unwilling to initiate a war with the United States, the fort's commander, Major William Campbell, refused to open the gates, leading the Native Americans to withdraw from the area. Although the battle lasted little more than an hour, Fallen Timbers was the culmination of an arduous campaign and owed its success to the intense training and discipline of the Legion of the United States. The Legion encamped near Fort Miami for three days, but without their heavy artillery they eventually withdrew.

Wayne waited in the area for a renewed attack which never came, but his supply trains were subject to continuous harassment and attacks. That September, he led the Legion from Fort Defiance and marched unopposed for two days to the Kekionga, the Native American city where Harmar had been defeated four years earlier. Here, the Legion constructed Fort Wayne. Wayne appointed Hamtramck as commandant of Fort Wayne and departed in late October, arriving at Fort Greenville on 2 November 1794. That winter, the Legion reinforced the line of defensive forts with Fort St. Marys, Fort Loramie, and Fort Piqua.

On 3 August 1795, as a result of the Army's victory at Fallen Timbers and the Jay Treaty, leaders of the Northwestern Confederacy signed the Treaty of Greenville, ending the Northwest Indian War. In 1796, Wayne accepted the handover of all the eight British forts, including Fort Niagara and Fort Lernoult, in the Northwest Territory as stipulated in the Jay Treaty.

The Department of War accounted for approximately 40% of the United States budget, so early in 1796, with the threat of conflicts with Native Americans or Britain reduced, Congress reduced the Legion to just 3,359 and reverted to calling it the United States Army. The 1st, 2nd, 3rd, and 4th Sub-Legions became the 1st, 2nd, 3rd, and 4th Regiments of the Army. After Wayne's death at Fort Presque Isle on 15 December 1796, his second-in-command, Wilkinson (later found to be a spy for the Spanish government), became the Senior Officer of the Army.

== Legacy ==
=== Notable members of the Legion ===
Major General Hugh Brady was a lieutenant in the Legion of the United States at Fallen Timbers.

- Lieutenant William Henry Harrison, Wayne's aide-de-camp and later 9th President of the United States
- Lieutenant William Clark, later co-led the Lewis and Clark Expedition
- Ensign Meriwether Lewis was present at the Treaty of Greenville, later co-led the Lewis and Clark Expedition
- Captain William Eaton, diplomat and military leader during the First Barbary War
- Brigadier General Thomas Posey, later a lieutenant-governor of Kentucky and then governor of Indiana Territory.
- Captain Zebulon Pike Sr., father of explorer Zebulon Pike.
- Captain William Wells, son-in-law of Miami chief Little Turtle who joined the Legion and led Wayne's intelligence detachment, later led relief at Battle of Fort Dearborn
- Lieutenant John Whistler, an officer who had served with the British during the American Revolutionary War, first commandant of Fort Dearborn.

=== Lineage ===
The 1st Sub-Legion is found today in the 3rd United States Infantry Regiment (The Old Guard). The distinctive unit insignia worn on the epaulette of the 3rd Infantry Regiment is a gold-colored metal device that shows "an Infantry officer's cocked hat of 1784 with plume." This alludes to the crest of the 3rd Infantry Regiment's coat of arms, which shows a black cocked hat with white plume. These are the colors of the 1st Sub-Legion. An example of a similar hat can be seen in the uniforms of the 3d Infantry Regiment's fife and drum corps.

The 2nd Sub-Legion is found today in the 1st Infantry Regiment. The 2nd Sub-Legion became the 2nd Regiment U.S. Army, from which today's 1st Infantry Regiment is descended. The coat of arms for the 1st U.S. Infantry Regiment shows part of the shield in red in honor of the 2nd Sub-Legion.

The 4th Sub-Legion is found today in the 4th Infantry Regiment. The coat of arms of the 4th U.S. Infantry Regiment is green and white in honour of the 4th Sub-Legion.

== Notes ==
=== See also ===
- Combined arms
- History of the United States Army
- U.S. Army Regimental System

=== Sources ===
- Elting, John R. (1974). Military Uniforms in America: The Era of the American Revolution 1755-1795. Vol. 1. San Rafael, CA: Presidio Press. ISBN 978-0-89141-000-3.
- Gaff, Alan D. (2004). Bayonets in the Wilderness: Anthony Wayne's Legion in the Old Northwest. University of Oklahoma Press. ISBN 978-0-8061-3585-4.
- Hemmis, Timothy C. (2021). "Learning 'The Dreadful Trade of Death' Training the U.S. Army at Legionville, 1792–1793". Military Review. Army University Press.
- Kochan, James, and David Rickman. (2001). The United States Army 1783–1811. Oxford, UK: Osprey Publishing. ISBN 978-1-84176-087-2.
- Maass, John R (2013). Defending a New Nation, 1783–1811 (PDF). Washington, DC: Center of Military History United States Army. CMH Pub 74–1. Archived from the original (PDF) on 18 May 2015.
- Nelson, Paul David (1985). Anthony Wayne, Soldier of the Early Republic. Bloomington: Indiana University Press. ISBN 0-253-30751-1.
- Sword, Wiley (1985). President Washington's Indian War: The Struggle for the Old Northwest, 1790–1795. Norman: University of Oklahoma Press. ISBN 0806124881.
- Winkler, John F (2013). Fallen Timbers 1794. The US Army's first victory. Oxfort, UK: Osprey Publishing. ISBN 978-1-78096-375-4.

=== External links ===
- McGrane, R. C. (December 1914). "William Clark's Journal of General Wayne's Campaign". The Mississippi Valley Historical Review. 1 (3). Oxford University Press on behalf of Organization of American Historians: 418–444. doi:10.2307/1897611. JSTOR 1897611.
- Denny, Ebenezer (1859). Military Journal of Major Ebenezer Denny. Philadelphia: J.B. Lippincott & Co.
- Randolph (October 1954). "A Precise Journal of General Wayne's Last Campaign" (PDF). American Antiquarian Society: 273–301.
