= Egushawa =

Odawa war chief and principal political chief

Egushawa (c. 1726 – March 1796), also spelled Egouch-e-ouay, Agushaway, Agashawa, Gushgushagwa, Negushwa, and many other variants, was a war chief and principal political chief of the Odawa, an indigenous North American people. His name is loosely translated as "The Gatherer" or "Brings Together" (cf. Ojibwe agwazhe'waa, "to quilt something(s); to blanket someone(s)"). He was a prominent leader among the Detroit Odawa, a prominent group in southeast Michigan and northwest Ohio. Egushawa is considered a successor to Chief Pontiac. As a leader in two wars against the United States, Egushawa was one of the most influential Native Americans of the Great Lakes region in the late eighteenth century.

== Background ==
Egushawa first appears in historical records in 1774, when he signed an indenture granting an island in the Detroit River to Alexis Masonville in 1774, not far from the British Army outpost of Fort Detroit. Nothing is known for certain about his life before that time. He was likely born in the Detroit River region, in what is now Michigan or Ontario. The Odawa were prominent in this area and many had settled around Fort Detroit after it was constructed by the French in 1701. Their influence and territory extended into present-day northwest Ohio, along the Maumee River.

Egushawa came to prominence as a successor to Pontiac, the famous Odawa leader, to whom he may have been related. Egushawa may have fought against the British during the French and Indian War (1754–1763) as an ally of the French.

== American Revolution ==
When the American Revolutionary War (1775–1783) began, Egushawa was living in a village at the mouth of the Maumee River, the location of the present-day Toledo, Ohio. Egushawa supported the efforts of the British in Fort Detroit to recruit American Indians allies in order to attack U.S. settlements in Kentucky. In April 1777, he traveled with British officials to Vincennes to help forge an alliance with some of the Wabash tribes. For his efforts, Henry Hamilton, British lieutenant governor at Detroit, awarded Egushawa a sword in June 1777.

Egushawa saw much action in the war. He accompanied St. Leger's expedition in upstate New York, taking part in the bloody Battle of Oriskany on 6 August 1777. In 1778, he was the main chief with Hamilton's expedition to recapture Vincennes after it had been taken by Colonel George Rogers Clark of Virginia. He admonished Piankeshaw chief Young Tobacco for working with the Virginians, which Hamilton understood to be a threat. Clark made a surprise return to Vincennes in 1779 and captured Hamilton, but Egushawa escaped. In 1780, his war band accompanied Captain Henry Bird's invasion of Kentucky, in which two American "stations" (fortified settlements) were captured.

In the 1783 peace treaty which ended the Revolutionary War, the British ceded the land of their Native American allies to the United States. Without British military support, Native Americans were compelled to sign various peace treaties which ceded portions of the Northwest Territory to the United States, culminating with the Treaty of Fort Harmar in 1789. Egushawa opposed these treaties and did not consider them to be binding.

== Northwest Indian War ==
After the Revolutionary War, Shawnee of the Ohio Country began to forge a confederacy to oppose U.S. occupation of the land ceded by the British in what became called the Northwest Territory (now Midwest of the United States). These efforts were clandestinely supported by the British, who had refused to abandon Fort Detroit and Fort Mackinac as called for in the 1783 peace treaty with the United States. Egushawa was initially reluctant to take part in the Northwest Indian War, but he joined the native Western Confederacy after the defeat in October 1790 of an American army led by Josiah Harmar .

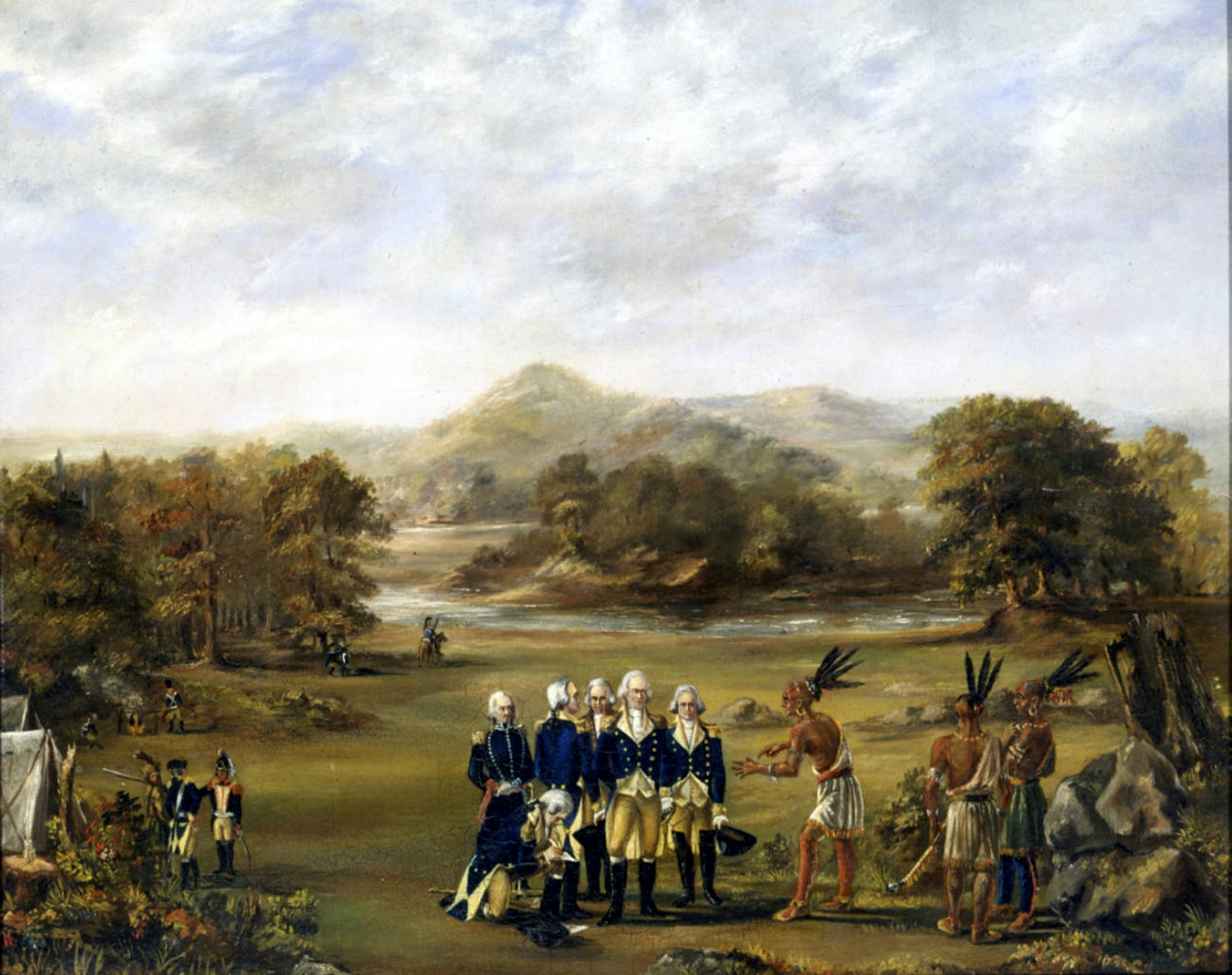
The Treaty of Greenville

As a war chief, recruiter, and a diplomat to the British, Egushawa became one of the most prominent leaders in the war. He belonged to the pro-war faction of the confederacy, arguing that the only path to peace was through war, since "the enemy confide in their superior numbers and strength and not on God, who made them and us, nor on the justice of their cause."

In 1791, he probably led members of the Odawa, Ojibwa, and Potawatomi contingent at the St. Clair's Defeat, the most severe defeat ever suffered by the United States at the hands of American Indians.

In 1794, Egushawa was seriously wounded in the American Indian defeat at the Battle of Fallen Timbers in the future Ohio, north of the Maumee River. It was the last time Egushawa saw combat.

Recuperating, he lived on the Maumee or Raisin rivers (the latter in southern Michigan). He continued to urge fellow American Indian leaders to support the British Crown. With the British distracted by European wars, however, they did not offer renewed military support to Native American resistance.

Egushawa finally agreed to negotiate a peace treaty with the Americans, one of the last chiefs to do so. He signed the Treaty of Greenville on August 3, 1795, ceding much of southeastern Michigan but preserving some of northwest Ohio for Odawa use. He died near Detroit shortly thereafter, probably leaving no descendants.
