= Thomas McKee =

British Army officer and politician

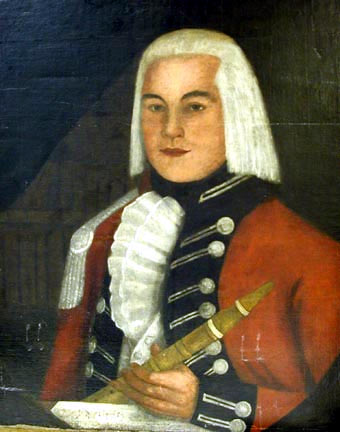
- Often identified as a portrait of his father Alexander, this is probably Thomas McKee because the uniform is that of an officer of the 60th Regiment of Foot of the 1790s.

Superintendent of Indian affairs for the Northwestern District
- In office 1796–1800

Member of 2nd Parliament of Upper Canada for Kent
- In office 1797–1800
- Preceded by: François Baby
- Succeeded by: Thomas McCrae

Member of 3rd Parliament of Upper Canada for Essex
- In office 1801–1804
- Preceded by: New - split from Suffolk & Essex
- Succeeded by: David Cowan

Personal details
- Born: c. 1770 Ohio Country, British America
- Died: 20 October 1814 Île des Cascades, Lower Canada
- Spouse(s): unknown (1st); Thérèse Askin m. 1797 (2nd)
- Children: 1 son with Askin
- Parent(s): Alexander McKee (father); Nonhelema Hokolesqua (mother)

Military service
- Allegiance: Great Britain
- Branch/service: British Army (1791–1806); British Indian Department (1797–1814); Essex Militia (1807–1814)
- Rank: Captain (British Army); Superintendent of Indian affairs Major (Essex Militia)
- Battles/wars: Siege of Fort Recovery, War of 1812

Thomas McKee (c. 1770 – 20 October 1814) was a British Army officer and politician of Anglo-Shawnee descent.

== Biography ==
McKee was born in the Ohio Country around 1770. He was the son of Alexander McKee (c. 1735–1799), an important official in the British Indian Department, and the grandson of Thomas McKee (c.1695–1769), a veteran of King George's War and the French and Indian War as well as a business associate of George Croghan. His great-grandfather Alexander McKee (d.1740) immigrated to Pennsylvania from County Antrim, Ireland, around 1707, and was a veteran of the Battle of the Boyne. His mother was Nonhelema, a Shawnee chief.

In 1788, the Ojibwa and Odawa granted him a lease for Pelee Island for 999 years. In 1791, he became a member of the 60th Regiment of Foot of the British Army at Detroit. Three years later, he was part of the Siege of Fort Recovery. eventually reaching the rank of Captain in 1796. In the same year, he became superintendent of Indian affairs for the Northwestern District. In 1797, he also became responsible for the Amherstburg region and he was elected to represent Kent in the 2nd Parliament of Upper Canada. McKee was reelected in 1800 to represent Essex. Around 1806, his duties with the 60th Foot ended, he joined the local Essex Militia and served as a Major in the militia during the War of 1812. In 1814, he was accused of grave misconduct, having gotten drunk and allowed his native followers to become drunk and disorderly. During his life, he owned seven or eight slaves.

He died near Île des Cascades in Lower Canada in 1814 while travelling to Montreal.
