= Jacob Kingsbury =

American military personnel (1756–1837)

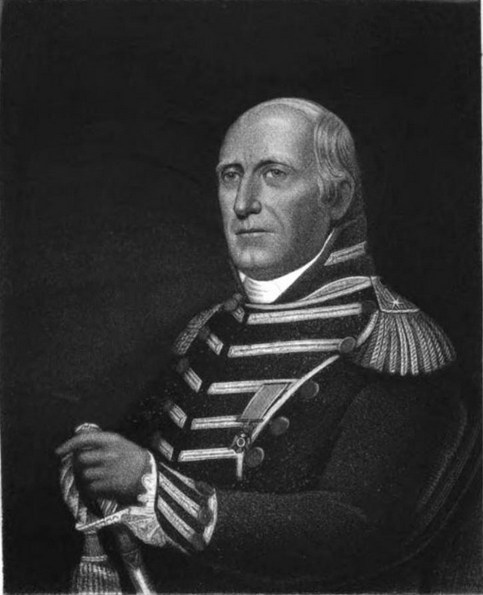
- Etching of Kingsbury based on a circa 1810 portrait.
- Born: July 6, 1756; Norwich, Connecticut
- Died: July 1, 1837 (aged 80); Franklin, Connecticut
- Burial place: Franklin, Connecticut
- Spouse: Sally Palmer Ellis
- Military career
- Allegiance: United States
- Branch: Continental Army; United States Army
- Service years: 1775–1783, 1787–1815
- Rank: Colonel
- Units: First American Regiment; Legion of the United States; 1st Infantry Regiment
- Commands: 1st Infantry Regiment
- Conflicts: American Revolutionary War Northwest Indian War: Dunlap's Station; Fallen Timbers; War of 1812

Signature
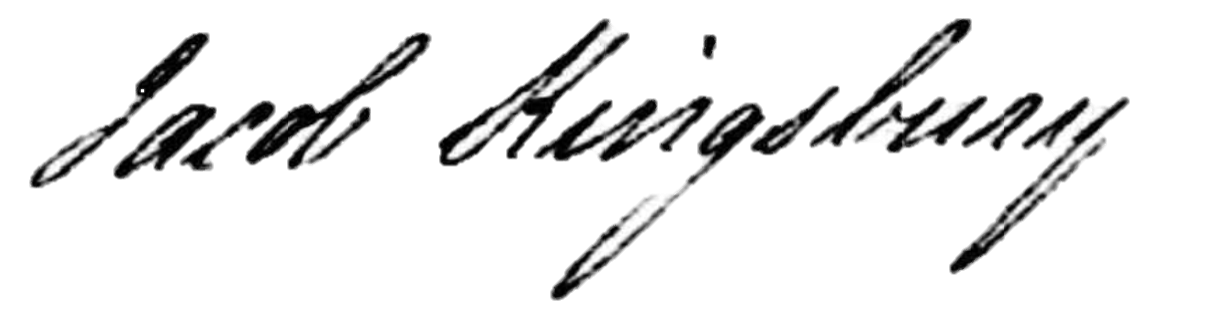

Colonel Jacob Kingsbury (1756–1837) was a career officer in the United States Army. He was one of the few U.S. Army officers who was a veteran of both the American Revolution and the War of 1812. He was a Federalist.

== Biography ==
He was born in the West Farms Society of Norwich, Connecticut, on July 6, 1756, to Nathaniel and Sarah Hill Kingsbury.

=== American Revolutionary War ===
Aged 19, he enlisted in the 8th Connecticut Regiment on July 11, 1775. The 8th Connecticut Regiment was part of the Continental Army during the Siege of Boston. Kingsbury was promoted to corporal prior to the Regiment's disbandment on December 16, 1775.

Kingsbury remained in the Continental Army when it was reorganized in January 1776. He was promoted to sergeant and then was commissioned an ensign in Webb's Additional Continental Regiment on April 26, 1780. He served until the Continental Army was disbanded on November 3, 1783. After the war, he became an original member of the Connecticut Society of the Cincinnati.

=== Post Revolution ===
After a break in service of almost four years, he was commissioned a lieutenant in the First American Regiment (today known as the 3rd Infantry Regiment) on October 15, 1787. He served in the ill-fated campaigns of Colonel Josiah Harmar in 1790 and General Arthur St. Clair in 1791 against the Miami Tribe in what is modern-day Ohio.

On January 10 and 11, 1791, Kingsbury distinguished himself at the Siege of Dunlap's Station, where he led a detachment of only 12 soldiers, along with a few settlers, in defending a small outpost against a far superior force of Native Americans. Following St. Clair's Defeat in November 1791, he was promoted to captain in April 1792 retroactive to December 28, 1791.

Kingsbury was assigned to the 1st Sub-Legion when the army was re-organized in 1792 and commanded the 3rd Sub-Legion of the United States in the Battle of Fallen Timbers on August 20, 1794, which decisively defeated the Native Americans in Ohio. When the army was re-organized in 1796, the 1st Sub-Legion reverted to being designated as the 1st Infantry Regiment.

Kingsbury was promoted to major of the 1st Infantry Regiment in 1797 and lieutenant colonel of the Second Infantry Regiment in 1803.

Early in 1802, he was assigned to command Fort Wilkinson in Georgia, where he was under the command of Brigadier General James Wilkinson.

In 1805, he established Fort Belle Fontaine on the Missouri River and was there until he was promoted to colonel and placed in command of the 1st Infantry in 1808.

In 1807, Kingsbury was elected to membership in the United States Military Philosophical Society, which was the first professional association of officers of the United States Army.

=== War of 1812 ===
During the War of 1812, Kingsbury was appointed to command the defenses of Newport, Rhode Island. He was inspector general for Military District No. 2 (comprising the states of Connecticut and Rhode Island) from April 8, 1813, to October 31, 1814. He was among the American officers leading the American defense in Lyme, Connecticut during the April 9, 1814 raid on Essex, Connecticut. While serving as inspector general, command of Connecticut's military forces temporarily devolved onto him in May 1814 after Brigadier General Henry Burbeck was removed from command of District No. 2. Kingsbury was succeeded in command of the district in July 1814 by Brigadier General Thomas Humphrey Cushing.

At the end of the war, Colonel Kingsbury was discharged from the Army on June 15, 1815, after 36 years of service.

He died on July 1, 1837, at his home in Franklin, Connecticut. He is buried in the Plains Cemetery in Franklin.

== Family ==
He married Sally Palmer Ellis (1778–1857), by whom he had five sons and three daughters:

- Eliza Rosanna Thayer Kingsbury (1800–1800); died in infancy.
- James Wilkinson Kingsbury (1801–1853); graduated from West Point in 1823. Served with distinction during the Black Hawk War and resigned from the army in 1836 to become keeper of U.S. military stores in St. Louis. He was the father of Mary Virginia Kingsbury, who married in 1865 the French aristocrat Armand François Robert comte de Giverville.
- Julia Ann Ellis Kingsbury (born 1804)
- Thomas Humphrey Cushing Kingsbury (1806–1880); first colonel of the 11th Connecticut Infantry Regiment during the American Civil War.
- William Eustis Kingsbury (1809–1835); collector of the Port of Presque Isle, Pennsylvania.
- Benjamin Ellis Kingsbury (1812–1813); died in infancy.
- Sarah Hill Kingsbury (1815–1840)
- Charles Ellis Kingsbury (born 1818); commissioned 2nd lieutenant in the 2nd Dragoons in 1836. Died in Florida in 1837.

== Dates of rank ==
=== Continental Army service ===
- Private, 8th Connecticut Infantry – July 11, 1775
- Corporal, 8th Connecticut Infantry – c. 1775
- Discharged – December 16, 1775
- Sergeant, Selden's Connecticut State Regiment – June 1776
- Discharged – December 1776
- Marine Sergeant, Connecticut Schooner Spy - May 8 - September 26, 1777
- Ensign, Webb's Additional Continental Regiment – April 26, 1780
- Ensign, 3rd Connecticut Regiment – January 1, 1781
- Ensign, Swift's Connecticut Regiment – June 1783
- Discharged – November 3, 1783

=== United States Army service ===
- Lieutenant, United States Infantry Regiment – October 15, 1787
- Captain, 1st Infantry – December 28, 1791
- Major, 2nd Infantry – May 15, 1797
- Lieutenant colonel, 1st Infantry – April 11, 1803
- Colonel, 1st Infantry – August 18, 1808
- Colonel, inspector general – April 8, 1813 to October 31, 1814
- Discharged – June 15, 1815

== Legacy ==
Reflecting his military service, Kingsbury's personal papers are located at a number of historical archives associated with locations he served at including the Missouri Historical Society Archives, the Detroit Public Library, and the Library of Congress.
