= Siege of Dunlap's Station =

1791 battle of the Northwest Indian War

Coordinates: 39°17′35″N 84°39′19″W

- Part of the Northwest Indian War
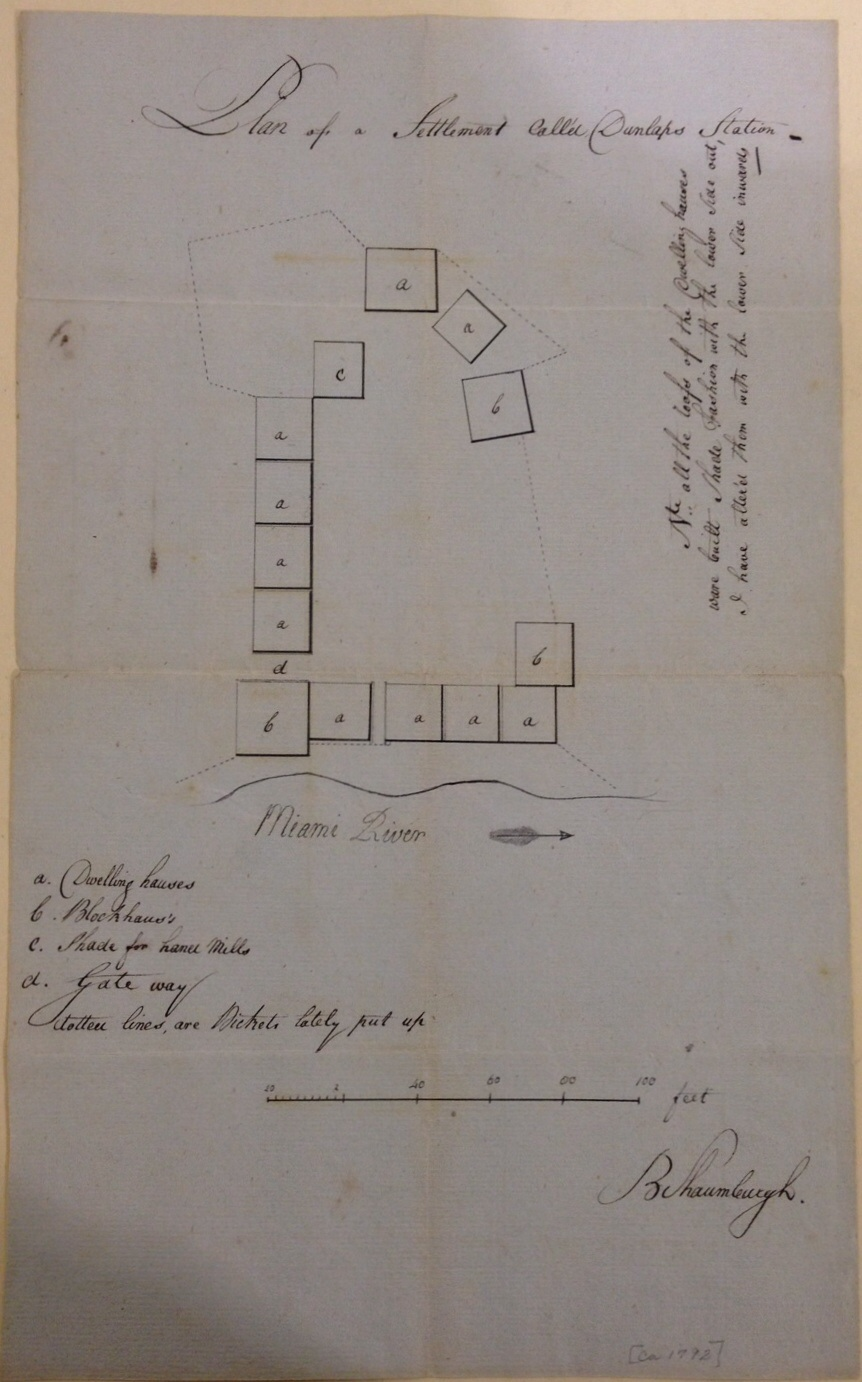
- A plan of Dunlap's Station
Date	January 10–11, 1791
Location	Ohio Country
Result	American victory

Belligerents
United States	Northwestern Confederacy; Province of Quebec

Commanders and leaders
Jacob Kingsbury; Josiah Harmar	Blue Jacket; Simon Girty

Strength
~30	~300–500

Casualties and losses
2 killed	~12–15 killed

The siege of Dunlap's Station was a battle that took place on January 10–11, 1791, during the Northwest Indian War between the Northwestern Confederacy of American Indians and European American settlers in what became the southwestern region of the U.S. state of Ohio. This was one of the Indians' few unsuccessful attacks during this period. It was shortly after the Harmar campaign attacks and unprecedented defeat of U.S. Army forces.

A few months after the siege, the United States Army suffered a major defeat at the hands of the Indians. This small episode, a week after the so-called Big Bottom massacre in what became southeast Ohio, turned into an iconic event: Ohioans believed that Native Americans had tortured innocent American settlers.

== Background ==
Detail of Collot's 1796 map; earliest known image

During their long and complex history on the North American continent, Indigenous peoples of the northeastern woodlands vigorously adopted every imaginable effort to survive and thrive. However, "By 1690, many of the Native American peoples in the eastern part of the region had been driven out by the Iroquois and their allies." The European American settlers who were encroaching upon Indian territory had either purchased or been awarded titles to plots of land in the Ohio Country, and this brought them into conflict with the Indian tribes in the area.

The Northwest Indian War began after the Revolutionary War, and those living near frontier outposts north of the Ohio were particularly subject to attack by Indians.

== Siege ==
Dunlap's Station, later known as Fort Colerain, was on the east bank of the Great Miami River, and established in early 1790 in the midst of what was also called Little Turtle's War. It served three main functions: as a base for American expansion into Indian territory, New Jersey–based land speculation, and a settlement for American farmers with their fields and pastures.

The Northwest Territory had been established in 1787, within which Judge Symmes had organized the Miami Company and then advertised the availability of this land. They hired the Irish surveyor John Dunlap, who led the party of men, women and children.

It was located next to the 2,000-year-old Colerain Earthwork, aka the Colerain Township Group (a lost geometric and hilltop enclosure), and one or more sacred Adena mounds, This prime floodplain site would have attracted the farmers. The natives may have lost the meaning of these older sacred sites, though.

The settlers cleared the land, constructed the station, and grew crops outside during the first summer. The blockhouses were built as a refuge from Native attacks, since this was still primarily Shawnee land. While neighbouring Indians and settlers had managed to share an earlier Christmas feast, naturally an application was made at Fort Washington for a garrison.

"...A small detachment of United States troops, under the command of Lieutenant Jacob Kingsbury, occupied the fort. It consisted of a corporal and eleven men, besides the commandant. Their names were Taylor, Neef, O'Neal, O'Leary, Lincoln, Grant, Strong, Sowers, Murphy, Abel, McVicar and Wiseman. The plan shows the cabins of the settlers. There were on the north side of the fort, Horn, McDonald, Barrott and Barket, with their families, and on the south side, White, with his family and McDonald, whose family was not at the station..."

Three blockhouses had been constructed for the military garrison, as had a shelter for the hand mill. The ten settler's cabins faced together, A cleared line of fire was begun by removing brush and felled trees, but this was not completed in time. Another vulnerability had been that the lower edges of the roofs were on the outside and had, for example, become a way into the Fort for their dogs. This was reversed, but there were still open spaces between some of the logs. As per Shaumburgh's Plan, all this was linked with 8' high fencing of log pickets, and then extended to the shore, The total enclosed about one acre.

=== Initial attack ===
Convinced that the untrained American (aka Shemanese, Long or Big Knives) militias were vulnerable to forays by united warriors, in November and December 1790 the chiefs of the Northwestern Confederacy met with the British Indian Department to request support for simultaneous raids on Baker's and Dunlap's Stations. The "white Indian" Simon Girty was honoured with the leadership of these attacks.

Everything started, however, on January 8, 1791, two days before the actual siege, when a cross-border surveying incursion, mostly by civilians and military not from Dunlap's Station, was attacked. John S. Wallace, Capt. John Sloan, surveyor Abner Hunt and a Mr. Cunningham from the station were inspecting a nearby clearing when they were surprised and assaulted by the native scouts.

The scouts were Shawnee (Algonquian-speaking), Myaami (Miami-Illinois), Lenape (Delawares), Wyandots (Hurons), and Niswi-mishkodewin (also known as the United Nations of Potawatomi Indians), Odawa (Ottawas), and Ojibwe (Chippewas). Cunningham was killed and scalped, and Abner Hunt was captured. Sloan was wounded and Wallace helped him back to the Station.

The settlers and soldiers under the command of Lieutenant Jacob Kingsbury, gathered in the blockhouses to prepare for the assault. This included the women melting spoons for bullets. Unsurprisingly, on Sunday the natives allowed Wallace to take them to Cunningham's body. "They buried it on the spot, and returned without molestation..."

Cone later wrote: "This night it rained, froze, and snow fell from four to five inches deep..." This fact would prove fatal to the planned attack with blazing arrows and torches.

On January 10, the Natives approached the station, bragging that they were led by the multi-lingual "villain" Simon Girty, and demanded surrender using their captive as an interpreter. This parlay lasted about an hour on the east side of the Fort. Gunfire broke out on the opposite side by the deep portion of the river while the demands were being made. Then the shooting continued for another two hours, but these battle demands were ignored. The attackers withdrew until the evening, but likely used the time to butcher their cattle.

The captive Hunt was killed under disputed circumstances. While the Girty brothers were alleged to have been present to instigate the execution of Abner Hunt, according to an 1843 report it seems more likely that Blue Jacket led this attack while Girty was at Baker's Station on the Virginia side of the Ohio.

The January 12th detailed written report from Kingsbury to Harmar simply called this a "murder," but the torture allegations could well be accurate. Wallace had escaped to summon reinforcements, who rapidly made their way to assist. Fighting resumed at the break of dawn the next day, January 11, however the Natives lacked siege weapons. They withdrew around 8:00 A.M. before a relief force from Fort Washington arrived around 10:00 A.M. Kingsbury later boasted about scalps his men had taken.

== Aftermath ==
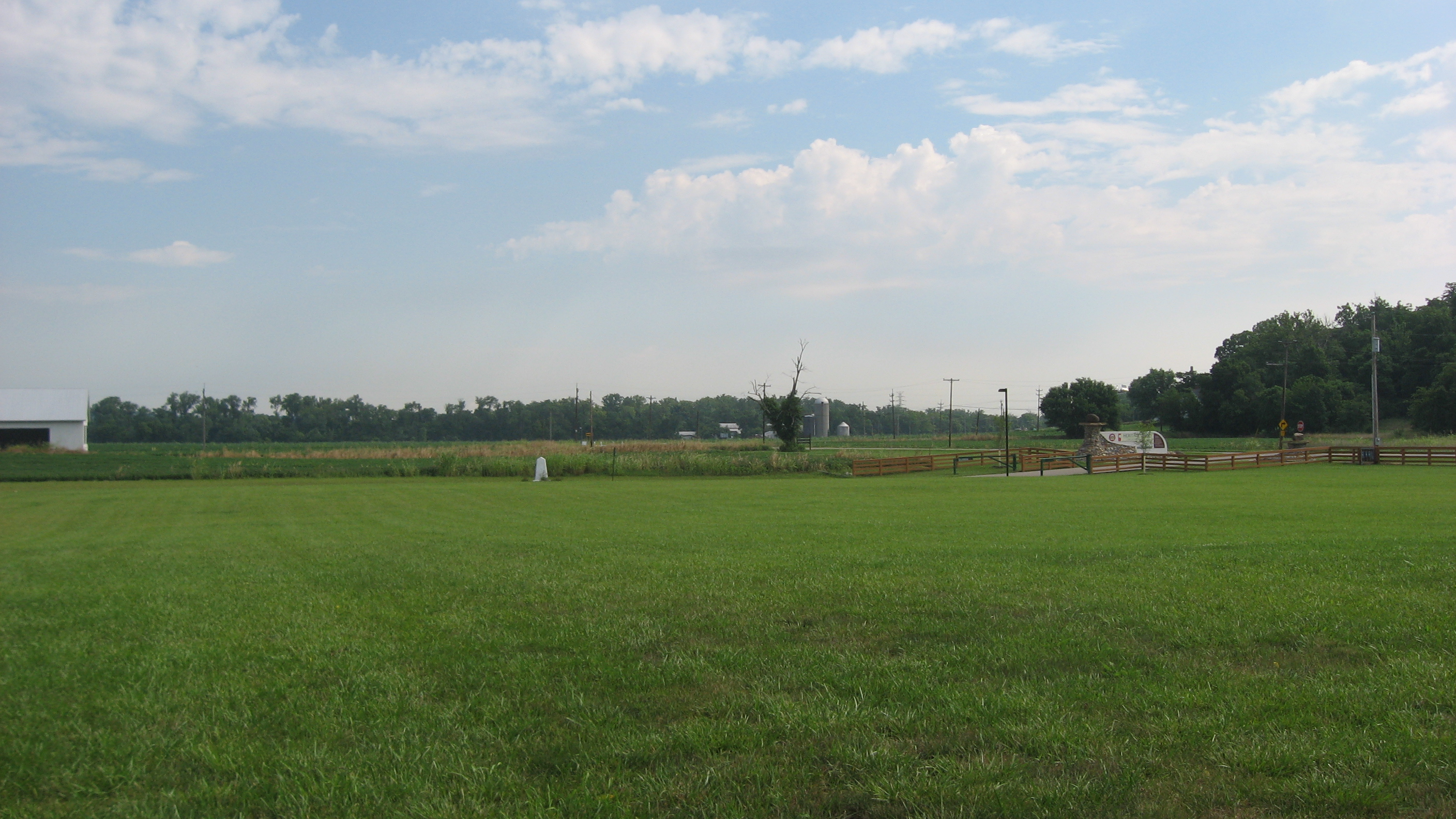
Site of Fort Dunlap

On January 14, Kingsbury was praised by Harmar. No mention was made of the honour and compassion shown to Wallace and Cunningham's body. However, the apparent torture of a surveyor during the effort to capture the small fort, especially as "white traitors" were said to be the leaders, was widely sensationalized as proof of "the savages'" inhumanity. Only two weeks later the press seemed to have begun the embellishment:

...The lieutenant answered, that if they were three hundred devils, he would not surrender; and immediately fired on the Indians, twelve of whom were killed. The remainder, after having quartered Mr. Hunt, in the view of the fort, made a rapid retreat: none of the garrison were either killed or wounded.

In late 1791 and early 1792, Thomas Jefferson and George Washington became involved after receiving such reports, as did as the luminaries of the Masonic Lodge. Plans were made for a more substantial fort the following year, possibly on the west bank of the Big Miami, but it seems this was never built. George Washington did not officially approve any of the Symmes Purchase until 1794, and many other legal issues plagued these transactions.

In 1881, Ford called this "the fiercest and longest sustained Indian attack recorded in the annals of Hamilton county." The station was later twice abandoned as being too vulnerable: George Rogers Clark had traversed this area in 1780, then parts of three other armies - "...Harmar' left wing, 1790; St. Clair' main body in 1791, and Wayne' center and left wing in 1793." The settlers' ownership was ultimately annulled by Washington and only after the defeat of Tecumseh's Confederation was the area successfully occupied. The station had been the key to settler survival in what became the entirety of Hamilton, Butler, and Warren Counties.

== See also ==
- Attacks on the United States
- Colerain Township, Hamilton County, Ohio
- Station (frontier defensive structure)
- Adena Mounds - Colerain Township Group – geometric and hilltop enclosures (lost)
- Native American conflicts, wars, battles, expeditions and campaigns.

== Full citations ==
- Blount, Jim. "Dunlap Station besieged by Indians" Journal-News Journal-News and the Golden Triangle Association, February 14, 2001
- Butterfield, Consul Willshire. History of the Girtys. 1890.
- Butts, pg. 297.
- Captives in American Indian Wars Captives in American Indian Wars
- Center for the Electronic Reconstruction of Historical and Archaeological Sites (CERHAS) at the University of Cincinnati, and the Newark Earthworks Center at the Ohio State University at Newark. Ancient Ohio Trail, The Great Miami Valley.
- Cist, Charles,. Sketches and statistics of Cincinnati in 1859. Cincinnati, Ohio : s.n., 1859. ISBN 9781153155328.
- Cone, Stephen Decatur Indian Attack on Fort Dunlap." Ohio History. Ohio Historical Society. January 1908, Vol. 17, Number 1 (pp. 64–72).
- Diemer-Eaton, Jessica. Woodland Indian Torture: A Perspective for Educators. Jun 13, 2011. http://voices.yahoo.com/woodland-indian-torture-perspective-educators-8571469.html
- Ford, Henry A. & Kate B. 1881 History of Hamilton County, Ohio, with Illustrations and Biographical Sketches. illustrated, BiblioBazaar, 2011 (reprint). ISBN 9781241338701. 598 pages.
- Greve, Charles Theodore. Centennial History of Cincinnati and Representative Citizens. Chicago: Biographical Pub. Co, 1904. Pages 284-286.
- Harmer to Hamtramack. http://gbl.indiana.edu/ethnohistory/archives/dockett_317/317_19n.html#272
- Howe, Henry., LL.D. Historical Collections of Ohio, Vol. I. C.J. Krihbiel & Co., Printers and Binders, 1888-1890. Pg. 750-751.
- Milligan, Fred, Ohio's Founding Fathers. iUniverse, 2003. ISBN 1469722666, 9781469722665. 336 pages.
- Rowland, Carolyn D., R. V. Van Trees, Marc S. Taylor, Michael L. Raymer and Dan E. Krane. Was the Shawnee War Chief Blue Jacket a Caucasian?, Forensic Bioinformatics, Inc., Dayton, OH 45324; Fairborn, OH 45324; Technical Associates Inc., Ventura, CA 93003; Department of Computer Science and Engineering, Wright State University, Dayton, OH 45435; and Department of Biological Sciences, Wright State University, Dayton, OH 45435. Ohio J. Sci 106 (4):126-129, 2006. https://web.archive.org/web/20110323100831/http://www.bioforensics.com/articles/BlueJacket.pdf
- Scamyhorn, Richard, and John Steinle. "Stockades In The Wilderness-The Frontier Defenses and Settlements of Southwestern Ohio 1788-1795" (1986).
- Shaumburgh, Lieutenant Bartholomew. 1791 Plan of Settlement Call'd Dunlap's Station
- Spooner, Walter Whipple, principal author, with an introduction by Florus B. Plimpton. The Back-woodsmen, Or, Tales of the Borders : a Collection of Historical and Authentic Accounts of Early Adventure Among the Indians. Cincinnati : Jones Bros., c1883. 608 p. : ill.
- The American museum or universal magazine: containing essays on agriculture, commerce, manufactures, politics, morals and manners .. Volume 9 of The American museum or universal magazine: containing essays on agriculture, commerce, manufactures, politics, morals and manners. 1791.
- Turner, G., "Plan and Elevation of a Stockade Work, with Block-House Bastions; designed for the defence of the Settlement of Coleraine, on the Great Miami River, 1791." Watercolor, pen and ink. Josiah Harmar Papers. Map Division, Small Maps 1791. [www.clements.umich.edu/exhibits/online/geometry_of_war/geometry5.php]
- Wheeler-Voegelin, Drs. Erminie, Emily J. Blasingham, Dorothy R. Libby: An Anthropological Report on the History of the Miamis, Weas, and Eel River Indians, Vol. 1. Chapter 2. http://gbl.indiana.edu/ethnohistory/archives/dockett_317a/317a_3e.html
- Winkler, John F. Wabash 1791: St Clair's Defeat. Volume 240 of Campaign (Osprey Publishing). Illustrated by Peter Dennis. 2011. ISBN 1849086761, 9781849086769. 96 pages.

== General references ==
- Burnet, Jacob (1847). Notes on the Early Settlement of the North-western Territory. Cincinnati: Derby, Bradley and Company.
- Butts, Edward. Simon Girty: Wilderness Warrior. Volume 29 of Quest Biography. Dundurn, 2011. ISBN 978-1554889501. 192 pp.
- Downes, Randolph Chandler. Frontier Ohio, 1788–1803, Volume 1. Volume 3 of Ohio historical collections. 280 pp.
- Eckert, Allen W. A Sorrow in Our Heart: The Life of Tecumseh. Reprint. Random House LLC, 1993. ISBN 978-0553561746. 1068 pp. Subjects Biography & Autobiography › General Biography & Autobiography / General History / Native American. p. 407 and note 381.
- Family Tree of Christopher W. Lane
- Gehio: Treaty of Fort Finney and Olde Coleraine
- Hoffman, Phillip W., Simon Girty Turncoat Hero: The Most Hated Man on the Early American Frontier. American History Imprints, 2009. ISBN 978-0984225637. 490 pp.
- Hover, John Calvin, 1866– ed. Barnes, Joseph Daniel, 1869– ed. Memoirs of the Miami valley. Vol. 3. [electronic resource] Chicago, Robert O. Law company, 1919. 3 v. ; 28 cm. p 292.
- Huston, Paul Griswold, Around an Old Homestead: A Book of Memories. p. 15. 1906. Eaton and Mains. Open Library OL 23466890M. OCLC 01581625.
- Ironstrack, George. The Mihši-maalhsa Wars – Part II. Myaamia Community Blog
- Keller, Christine, et al. Archeology of the Battles of Fort Recovery, Mercer County, Ohio: Education and Protection
- Kingsbury Family Papers, 1791–1924
- Kingsbury, Lt. Jacob – Commanders at Fort Belle Fontaine
- Kramb, Edwin A., Buckeye Battlefields. 1999 (June 2006) [pp. 105–09].
- Miami Valley 1700–1865 Reenactors Company. Dunlap's Station Revisited 1791
- Scholle, Frank & Don Linz. Colerain Township. ISBN 978-0738584331. 128 pp. Arcadia Publishing. 2010.
- Sugden, John, Blue Jacket: Warrior of the Shawnees. 2000. [pp. 110–11.]
- Thompson, Bob. The Clash of Cultures: Understanding the Conflict between Settlers and Native Americans on the Allegheny Plateau
- Wells, Ruth J. Colerain Township, Revisited. 1994. (PDF link)
- Williams, Gary S. The Forts of Ohio: A Guide to Military Stockades. ISBN 978-0970339515. Buckeye Book Press, 2003. 166 pages.

== Fiction ==
- Wiete, Robin Leanne. When Morning Comes. Penguin Group (Canada), 1993. ISBN 978-0451403360. 384 pages.
- Indian-Artifact Magazine, vol. 14-3, p. 5. Part of a story of Tecumseh and others.
- Mentioned in Eckert, Allan W. The Life of Tecumseh. 1992. p. 407 & note 381.
