= Robert Benham =

Robert Benham may refer to:

- Robert Benham (judge) (born 1946), first African-American to serve on the Supreme Court of Georgia
- Robert Benham (politician) (1750–1809), frontier pioneer; member of the first elected legislature for the State in Ohio
