= Benjamin Van Cleve =

Ohio pioneer

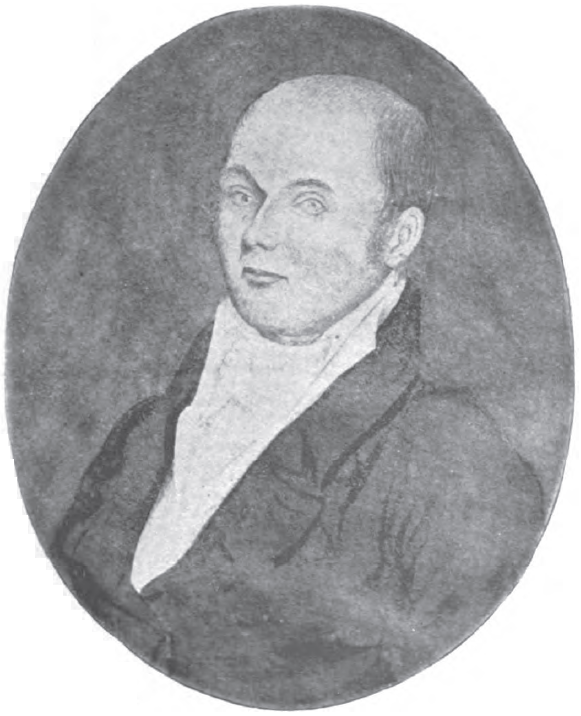

Benjamin Van Cleve (February 24, 1773 – November 29, 1821) was a pioneer settler of Dayton, Ohio in the United States. He held several offices in the town.

Benjamin Van Cleve was the oldest child of John and Catherine Benham Van Cleve of Monmouth County, New Jersey. Three siblings were born at Monmouth County in the 1770s. Two other siblings were born when the family lived in Washington County, Pennsylvania in the 1780s. The family moved west and arrived at Cincinnati, Northwest Territory on January 3, 1790.

In Cincinnati, John Van Cleve was a blacksmith and farmed, until 1791, when he was killed outside Cincinnati by Native Americans. Mrs. Van Cleve married again, and had two more children before moving to Dayton. Benjamin Van Cleve was employed by his uncle Capt. Robert Benham between 1791 and 1794 during the Northwest Indian War. As part of his duties, he escorted pack horses to Arthur St. Clair's army, and witnessed his defeat.

Van Cleve was present when Colonel Ludlow surveyed Dayton, and was one of the first settlers in Dayton on April 1, 1796. He assisted Ludlow and William G. Schenck that year as they surveyed the United States Military District in east-central Ohio. Van Cleve was married August 28, 1800, to Mary Whitten, in the first marriage in the settlement. He was the first postmaster, first school teacher, and first clerk of the court in Dayton, serving as clerk until his death in Dayton in 1821. He was one of the incorporators of the Dayton Library in 1805, and was appointed by the Ohio Legislature as a member of the first board of trustees of Miami University in 1809.

Van Cleve's wife birthed five children between 1801 and 1809, and died December 28, 1810. Van Cleve married Mary Tamplin March 10, 1812. He was Presbyterian by faith. His son, John W. Van Cleve, was mayor of Dayton in the 1830s.

Benjamin Van Cleve's Mother, Catherine Benham Van Cleve, was likely the sister of Northwest Territory politician Captain Robert Benham.

== Publications ==
- Memoirs of Benjamin Van Cleve. Nabu Press. 2010. ISBN 978-1-176-82405-8.
