= William Darke =

American military officer and politician (1736–1801)

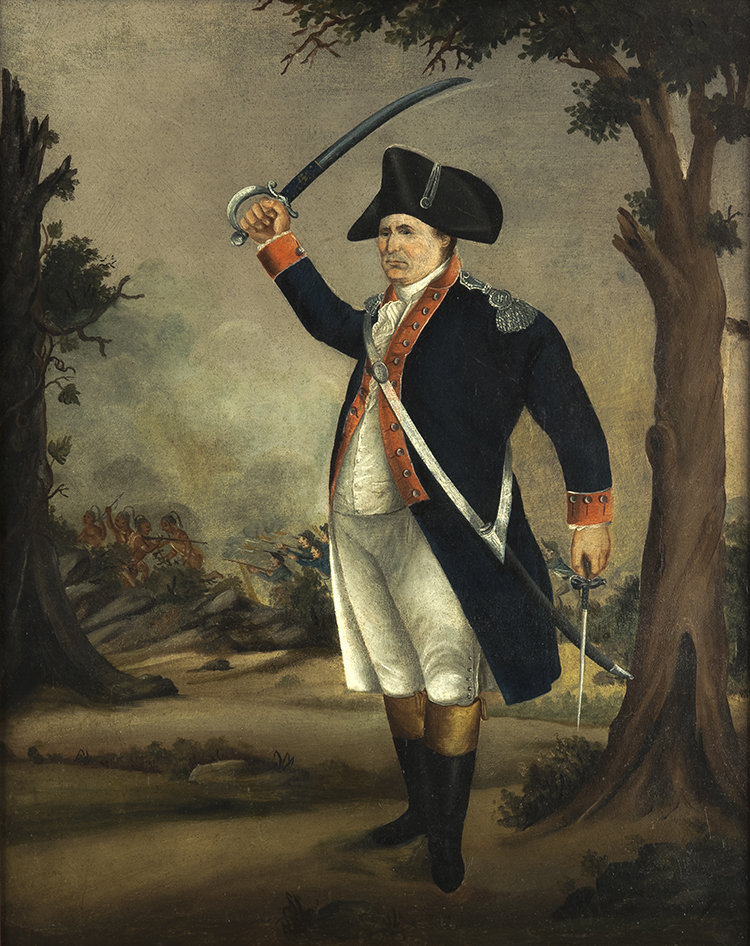
- c. 1791–1801 portrait of Darke by Frederick Kemmelmeyer
- Born: 1736; Bucks County, Pennsylvania
- Died: November 26, 1801 (aged 64–65); Jefferson County, Virginia
- Burial place: Ronemous Engle Cemetery
- Military career
- Allegiance: Virginia; United States
- Branch: Virginia Provincial Forces; Continental Army; Kentucky militia Virginia militia
- Service years: 1755–1791
- Rank: Major general (Virginia militia)
- Unit: 8th Virginia Regiment
- Commands: 1st Levy Regiment
- Conflicts: French and Indian War; Braddock Expedition; American Revolutionary War; Battle of Germantown (POW); Whiskey Rebellion; Northwest Indian War; St. Clair's defeat

Major General William Darke (1736 – November 26, 1801) was an American military officer and politician who served in the French and Indian War, American Revolutionary War and Northwest Indian War. In 1755, he participated in the unsuccessful Braddock Expedition in the Virginia Provincial Forces. During the Revolutionary War, he was commissioned into the Continental Army but was captured by British forces at the 1777 Battle of Germantown. Exchanged in 1780, he resumed his military service and participated in suppressing the Whiskey Rebellion.

One of the delegates of the 1788 Virginia Ratifying Convention, Darke was subsequently elected to the Virginia General Assembly. During the Northwest Indian War, he was present at St. Clair's defeat, one of the worst defeats in American military history. Badly wounded, Darke survived and returned to friendly territory, though one of his sons was killed in action. Darke was not punished and continued his military career, being appointed as a major general in the Virginia militia. He died in Jefferson County, Virginia in 1801.

== Early life ==
William Darke was born in Bucks County, Pennsylvania on May 6, 1736, the son of Joseph Darke. He was descended from early Quaker settlers who migrated from Britain to Bucks County, and was a cousin of Benjamin Rush, one of the Founding Fathers of the United States. Darke also had two brothers and one sister. As a young child, he moved with his family in 1740 to the Elk Branch near Shepherdstown, Virginia. Growing up, Darke fished, ploughed, and planted along his family. He was described as "a strong man of his hands", and "herculean".

== Military career and death ==
During the French and Indian War, Darke enlisted in the Virginia Regiment and participated in the 1755 Braddock Expedition under the command of General Edward Braddock. Braddock's plan was to capture Fort Duquesne from the French to gain control over the Ohio Valley. The expedition was defeated by a Franco-Indian force at the Battle of the Monongahela and retreated; Braddock was mortally wounded, but Darke was uninjured.

During the American Revolutionary War, Darke was commissioned into the Continental Army. As a captain in the 8th Virginia Regiment, he fought at the 1777 Battle of Germantown and was captured by British forces. Darke was held as a prisoner of war on board a prison ship in New York Harbor until being exchanged in 1780. He was promoted to lieutenant colonel and was possibly present at the siege of Yorktown in 1781. Following the end of the war in 1783, Darke participated in the suppression of the Whiskey Rebellion between 1791 and 1794. He was one of the delegates of the 1788 Virginia Ratifying Convention and was subsequently elected to the Virginia General Assembly.

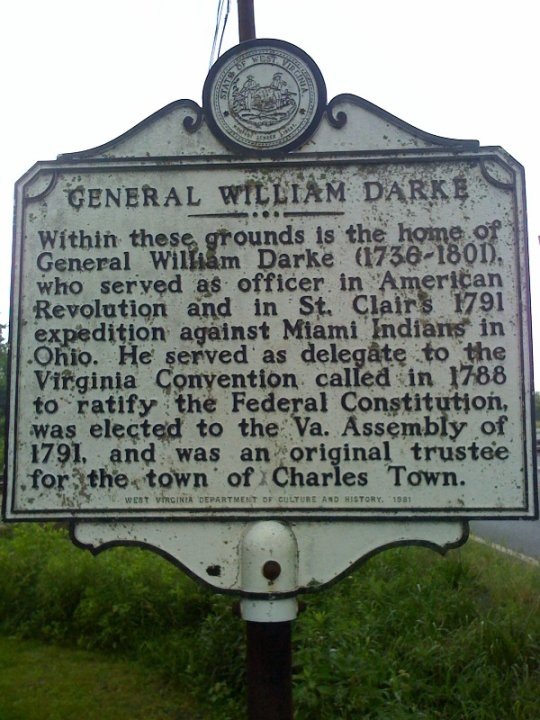
A historical sign for Darke near Shenandoah Junction

During the Northwest Indian War, Darke was commissioned into the Kentucky militia at the rank of lieutenant colonel. During St. Clair's defeat in 1791, he commanded the American left wing and made several unsuccessful charges against the opposing Northwestern Confederacy. The battle was a disastrous American defeat that resulted in a quarter of the US Army being destroyed in a single day; Darke's son Joseph was killed in action. Darke, despite being badly wounded, survived the battle and returned to friendly territory along with the remnants of the American army. He subsequently wrote a letter to President George Washington that described the battle. Darke was not punished and continued his military career, being made a major general of the Virginia militia. He died on November 26, 1801, in Jefferson County, Virginia.

== Personal life and legacy ==
Darke married Sarah, the widow of William Delayea. The couple had four children: John, Joseph, Samuel, and Mary. His three sons all died while young men. Darke took in Thomas Worthington, the 14-year-old orphaned son of a family friend, and gave him an education; Worthington later became the sixth governor of Ohio. Darke County, Ohio and Darkesville, West Virginia are both named for him.
