= Joseph Benham =

Joseph Benham was U.S. Attorney for the District of Ohio in 1823, son of Captain Robert Benham and born in Kentucky.

In 1815, Joseph graduated from the Ohio University in Athens, Ohio, its first graduation class.

In his book Old Court House, Judge Carter reported that Benham "wore a large buff vest and a brown broadcloth frock coat. He had a graceful and easy delivery. His voice was extremely deep but melodious, and according to the narrator was a most impressive one." On February 27, 1823, President James Monroe appointed him U.S. Attorney for the District of Ohio.

In 1825, Benham delivered a welcome speech to General La Fayette on behalf of the City of Cincinnati. Ten years later, in 1835, Benham became one of three law professors at the Cincinnati College where Jacob Burnet (an associate of his father in the first popularly elected legislature in Ohio) served on the board of trustees.

In 1839 Benham was one of several persons interviewed by the Ohio Democratic Party to possibly receive their nomination to the U.S. Senate to replace U.S. Senator Thomas Morris.

Joseph Benham died on July 15, 1840, when returning from New Orleans. He was buried in the Presbyterian Cemetery in Louisville. On January 1, 1858, he was re-interred in the Spring Grove Cemetery in Cincinnati; his wife Maria was buried there July 3, 1884.

Joseph Benham was first married to Isabella Greer. Their daughter, Harriette G. Benham, married George D. Prentice, editor of the Louisville Journal. Their son, Calhoun Benham, became a U.S. District Attorney for California, and later served in the Confederate Army. After Isabella's death, Joseph Benham married Maria Slacum, and their daughter Ada married Charles Snowden, Lord Fairfax of California.
