= St. Clair's defeat =

1791 battle of the Northwest Indian War

Battle of the Wabash
- Part of the Northwest Indian War
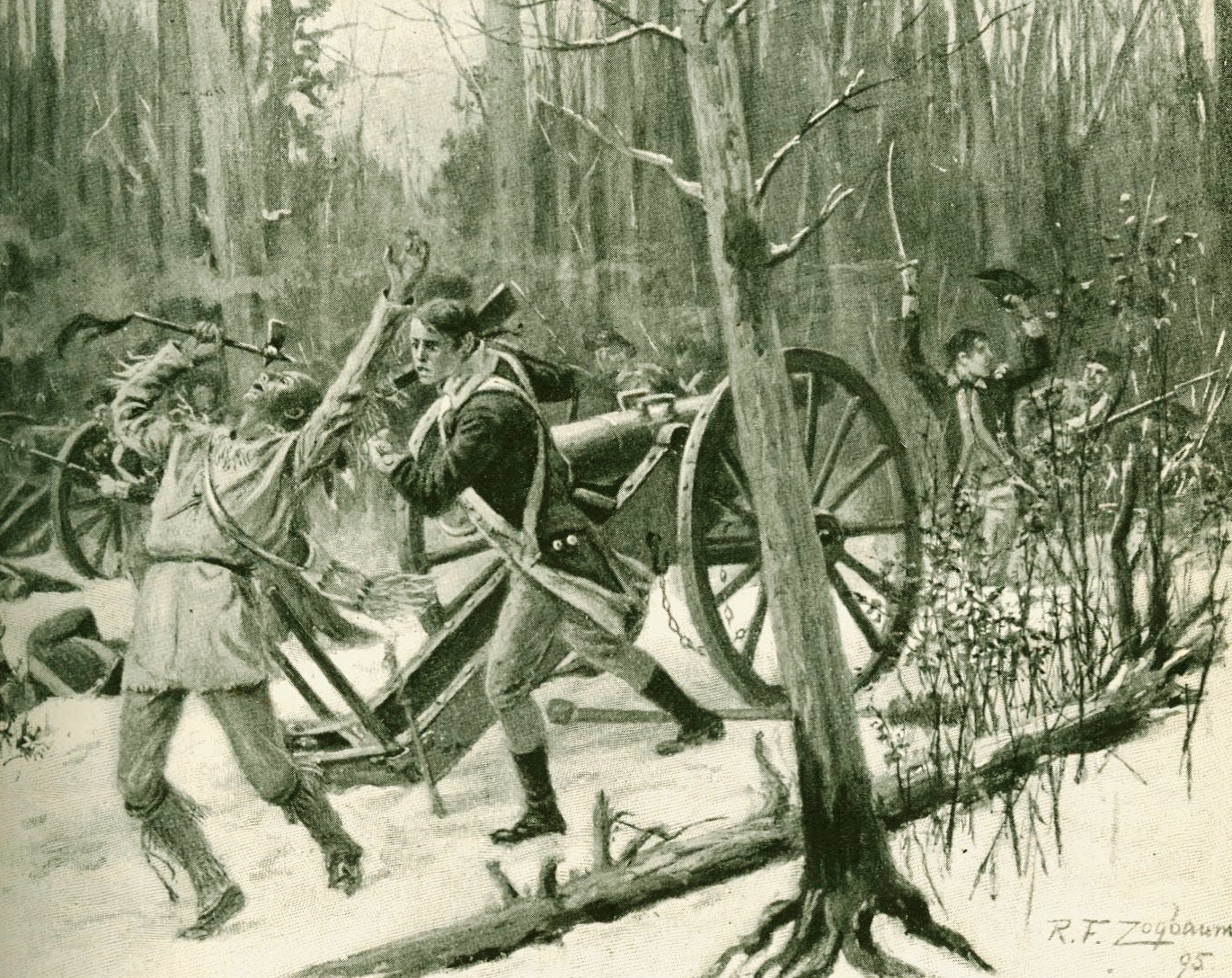
- 1895 illustration of the battle by Rufus Fairchild Zogbaum
Date	4 November 1791
Location	Present-day Fort Recovery, Ohio 40.41440°N 84.78022°W
Result	Northwestern Confederacy victory

Belligerents
Northwestern Confederacy	United States

Commanders and leaders
Little Turtle; Blue Jacket; Buckongahelas	Arthur St. Clair; Richard Butler †; William Darke

Strength
1,100	~1,000

Casualties and losses
21 killed 40 wounded	656 killed or captured 279 wounded

St. Clair's defeat, also known as the Battle of the Wabash, the Battle of Wabash River or the Battle of a Thousand Slain, was a battle fought on 4 November 1791 in the Northwest Territory of the United States. The U.S. Army faced the Northwestern Confederacy of Native Americans as part of the Northwest Indian War. It was "the most decisive defeat in the history of the American military" as well as the most substantial victory ever by Native American combatants against European-Americans.

The Native Americans were led by Little Turtle of the Miamis, Blue Jacket of the Shawnees, and Buckongahelas of the Delawares (Lenape). The war party numbered over 1,000 warriors, including many Potawatomis from eastern Michigan. The opposing force of about 1,000 Americans was led by General Arthur St. Clair. A surprise Native American attack at dawn overwhelmed the Americans. Of the 1,000 officers and men under St. Clair, only twenty-four escaped unharmed. As a result, President George Washington forced St. Clair to resign his post, and Congress initiated its first investigation of the executive branch.

== Background ==
In the 1783 Treaty of Paris, which ended the American Revolutionary War, Great Britain recognized United States sovereignty of all the land east of the Mississippi River and south of the Great Lakes. The native tribes in the Old Northwest, however, were not parties to this treaty, and many of them, especially leaders such as Little Turtle and Blue Jacket, refused to recognize American claims to the area northwest of the Ohio River. The young United States government, deeply in debt following the Revolutionary War and lacking the authority to tax under the Articles of Confederation, planned to raise funds via the methodical sale of land in the Northwest Territory.

This plan necessarily called for the removal of both Native American villages and American squatters. During the mid and late 1780s, a cycle of violence in Indian-American relations and the continued resistance of Native nations threatened to deter American settlement of the contested territory, so territorial representatives John Cleves Symmes and Jonathan Dayton petitioned President Washington and Secretary of War Henry Knox to use military force to crush the Miami.

A force of 1,453 men (320 regulars from the First American Regiment and 1,133 militia) under Brigadier General Josiah Harmar marched northwards from Fort Washington on 7 October 1790. The campaign ended in disaster for the United States. On 19–22 October, near Kekionga and Fort Miami (present-day Fort Wayne, Indiana), Harmar played into the hands of his enemies by dividing his forces. On three separate occasions, he failed to reinforce or reorganize his detachments as they were ambushed one after the other. Suffering more than 200 casualties, as well as a loss of a third of his packhorses, Harmar ordered a hasty retreat back to Fort Washington. Estimates of total Native casualties, killed and wounded, range from 120 to 150. The press vilified Harmar as a disgrace, and he would never hold a command again.

Washington then ordered Arthur St. Clair, governor of the Northwest Territory, to mount a more vigorous effort by the summer of 1791. Harmar's experience had proven that state militiamen, who made up the bulk of his army, were too undisciplined to be reliable. Congress authorized the raising of a second regiment of regular soldiers for six months, but at a reduced rate of pay. The demoralized First Regiment was reduced to 299 soldiers, while the new Second Regiment only had half the number of recruits needed for a full contingent. St. Clair was able to raise two regiments (five battalions) with six-month civilian levies but ultimately had no choice but to ask Kentucky to send its militia.

In May 1791, Lieutenant Colonel James Wilkinson led a subsequent raid in August 1791, intended to create a distraction that would aid St. Clair's march north. In the Battle of Kenapacomaqua, Wilkinson killed nine Wea and Miami and captured thirty-four Miami as prisoners, including a daughter of Miami war chief Little Turtle. Many of the confederation leaders had grown weary of fighting and were considering making overtures of peace to Congress. Upon hearing of Wilkinson's raid, however, the peace movement collapsed, and the tribes quickly united for war.

=== Command structure ===
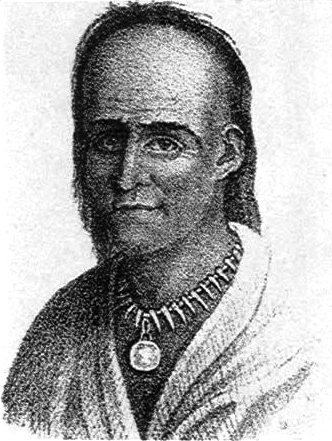
This lithograph of Little Turtle is reputedly based upon a lost portrait by Gilbert Stuart that was destroyed when the British burned Washington in 1814.

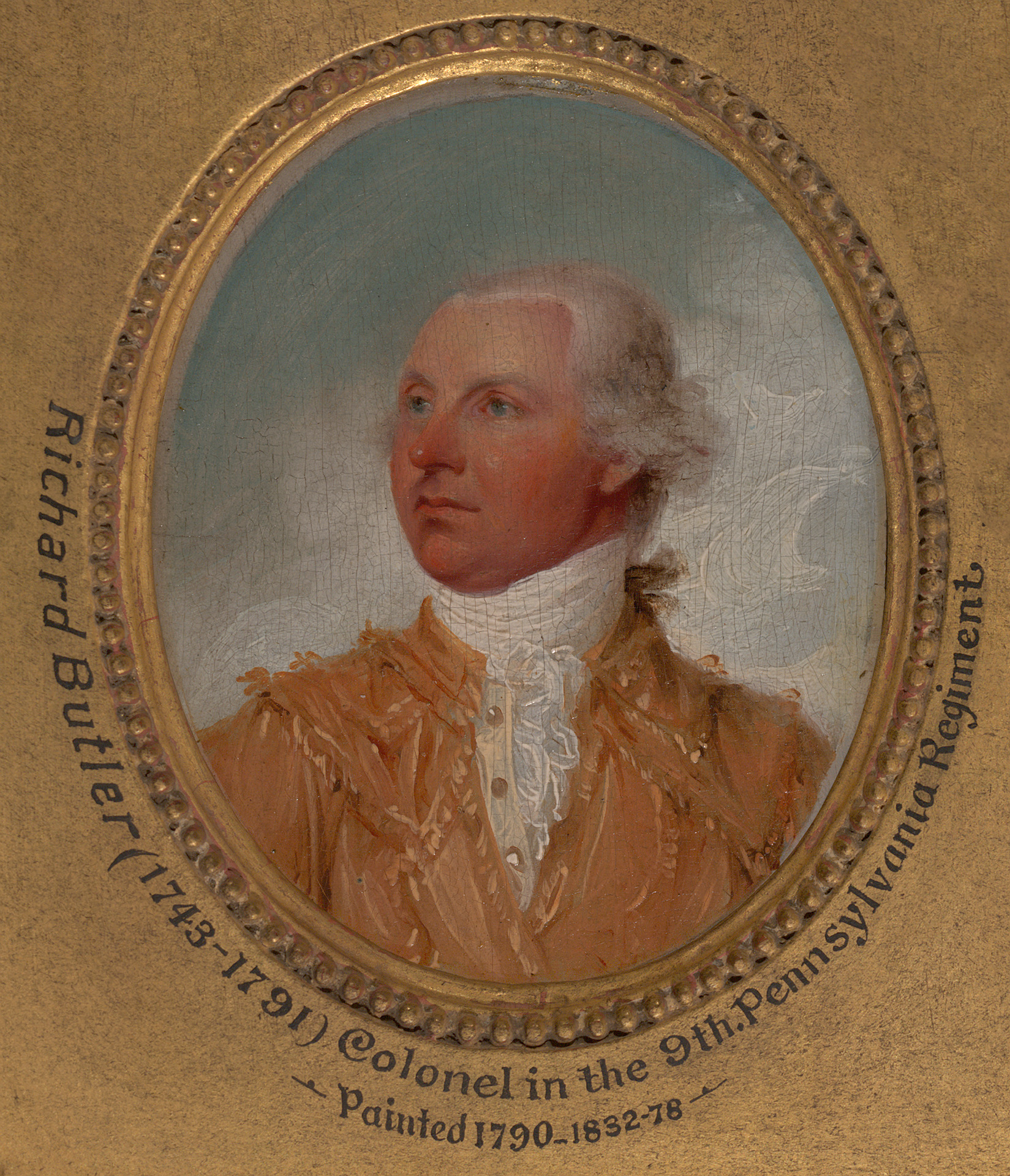
General Richard Butler

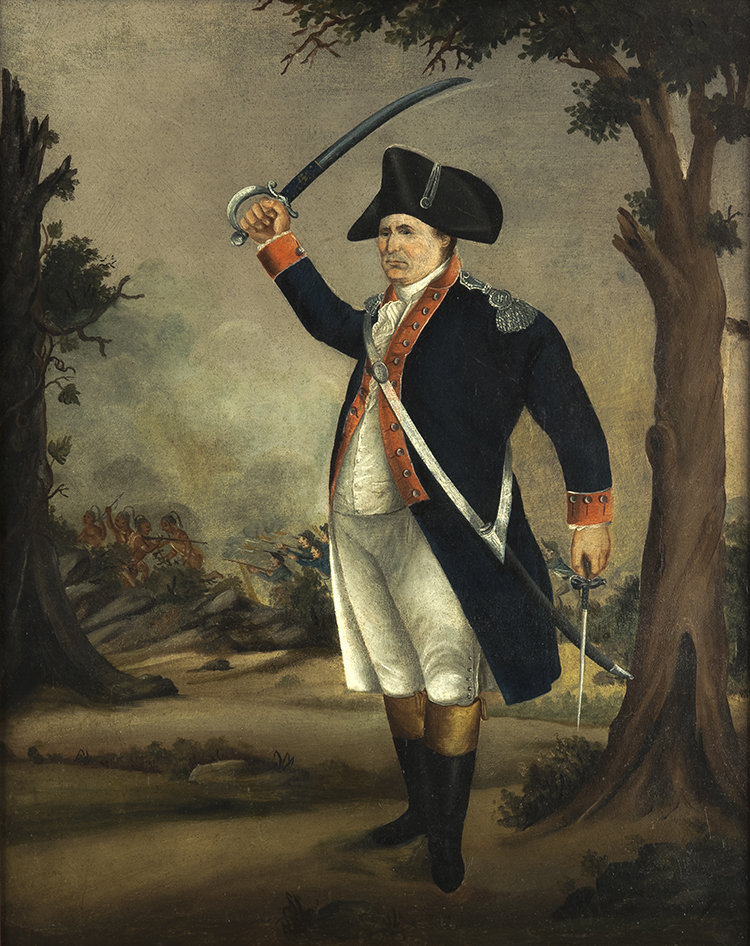
Portrait of William Darke by Frederick Kemmelmeyer made after the battle

The Native American forces did not have a formal command structure, and the overall planning and leadership have been debated. Blue Jacket and Little Turtle later claimed to have been in overall command of the united forces. John Norton claimed that when the battle began, the Shawnee took the lead. Little Turtle is often credited for the victory, but this may have been due to the influence of his son-in-law, William Wells, who later served with the United States as an Indian agent and interpreter.

The different nations were grouped by similar language groups in a crescent-shaped formation at the start of the battle. Little Turtle of the Miamis, Blue Jacket of the Shawnee, with Buckongahelas and Captain Pipe of the Lenape formed the center. Egushawa was among the leaders of the Ottawa, Potawatomi, and Ojibwe units to the left. Tarhe and Simon Girty were among the leaders of the Wyandot, Mingo, and Cherokee units that formed the right horn of the crescent.

In addition, two British officers from the 24th Regiment (2nd Warwickshire) Regiment of Foot were on hand to observe.

The United States command structure was as follows:

U.S. Army – Major General Arthur St. Clair

- 1st Infantry Regiment – Major Jean François Hamtramck (only part of the regiment under Captain Thomas Doyle was engaged)
- 2nd Infantry Regiment – Major Jonathan Hart †
- Artillery Battalion – Major William Ferguson †

U.S. levies – Major General Richard Butler †

- 1st Levy Regiment – Lieutenant Colonel William Darke
- 2nd Levy Regiment – Lieutenant Colonel George Gibson

Kentucky militia – Lieutenant Colonel William Oldham †

== Campaign ==
Washington was adamant for St. Clair to move north in the summer months, but various logistics and supply problems greatly slowed his preparations at Fort Washington (now Cincinnati, Ohio). The recruits had to be rushed through training, the food supplies were substandard, poor hygiene and disease were rampant, and the horses were low in number and of poor quality. The expedition thus did not set out until October 1791. Building supply posts as it advanced, the Army's objective was Kekionga, the capital of the Miami tribe.

The Army under St. Clair included 600 regulars, 800 six-month conscripts, and 600 militia at its peak, a total of around 2,000 men. Desertion took its toll; when the force finally got underway, it had dwindled to around 1,486 total men and some 200–250 camp followers (wives, children, laundresses, and prostitutes). Insubordination was constant; St. Clair, suffering from gout that made riding a horse difficult, struggled to keep order. Indians constantly shadowed the force, and skirmishes occasionally erupted. By 2 November, through further desertion and illness, St. Clair's force had been whittled down to around 1,120, including the camp followers. Meanwhile, the Western Confederacy increased its strength. Buckongahelas led his 480 men to join the 700 warriors under Little Turtle and Blue Jacket, bringing the war party to more than 1,000 men, including many Potawatomis from eastern Michigan.

St. Clair had only 52 officers and 868 enlisted and militia present on 3 November. That day, the combined force camped on an elevated meadow, with the First Infantry and volunteers encamped on the opposite side of the Wabash River from the Kentucky militia's camp, a decision that made it near-impossible for the Americans to reinforce one another quickly. No defensive works were constructed, even though natives had been seen in the forest. Butler sent a small detachment of soldiers under Captain Jacob Slough to drive off natives harassing the perimeter of his camp. The detachment engaged what they assumed to be a small party, but soon realized they were outnumbered. They retreated to camp and warned of what they believed to be an impending attack, but Butler did not send this report to St. Clair or build up the camp's defenses.

=== Battle ===
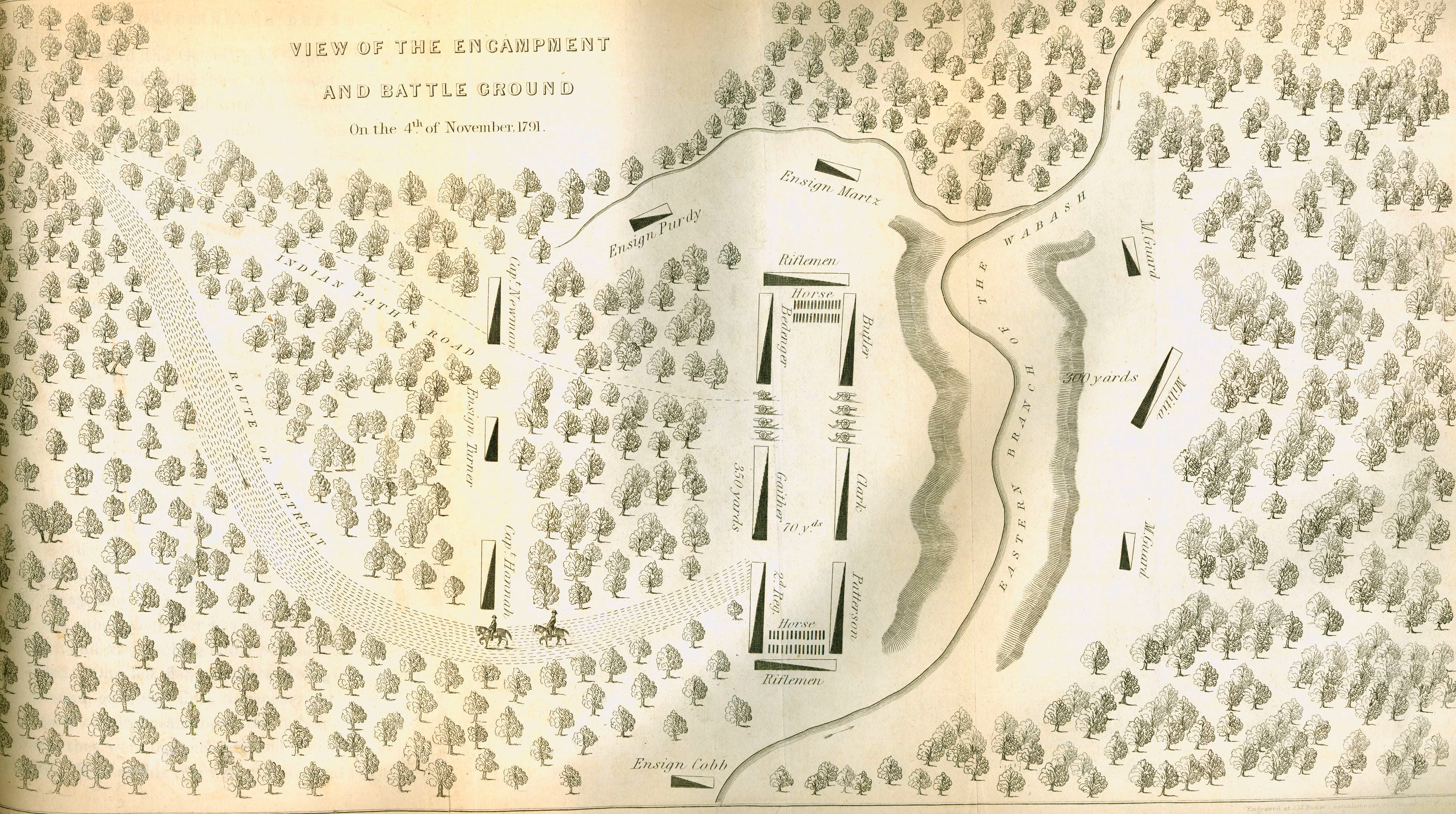
Map of St. Clair's encampment and retreat (north on bottom)

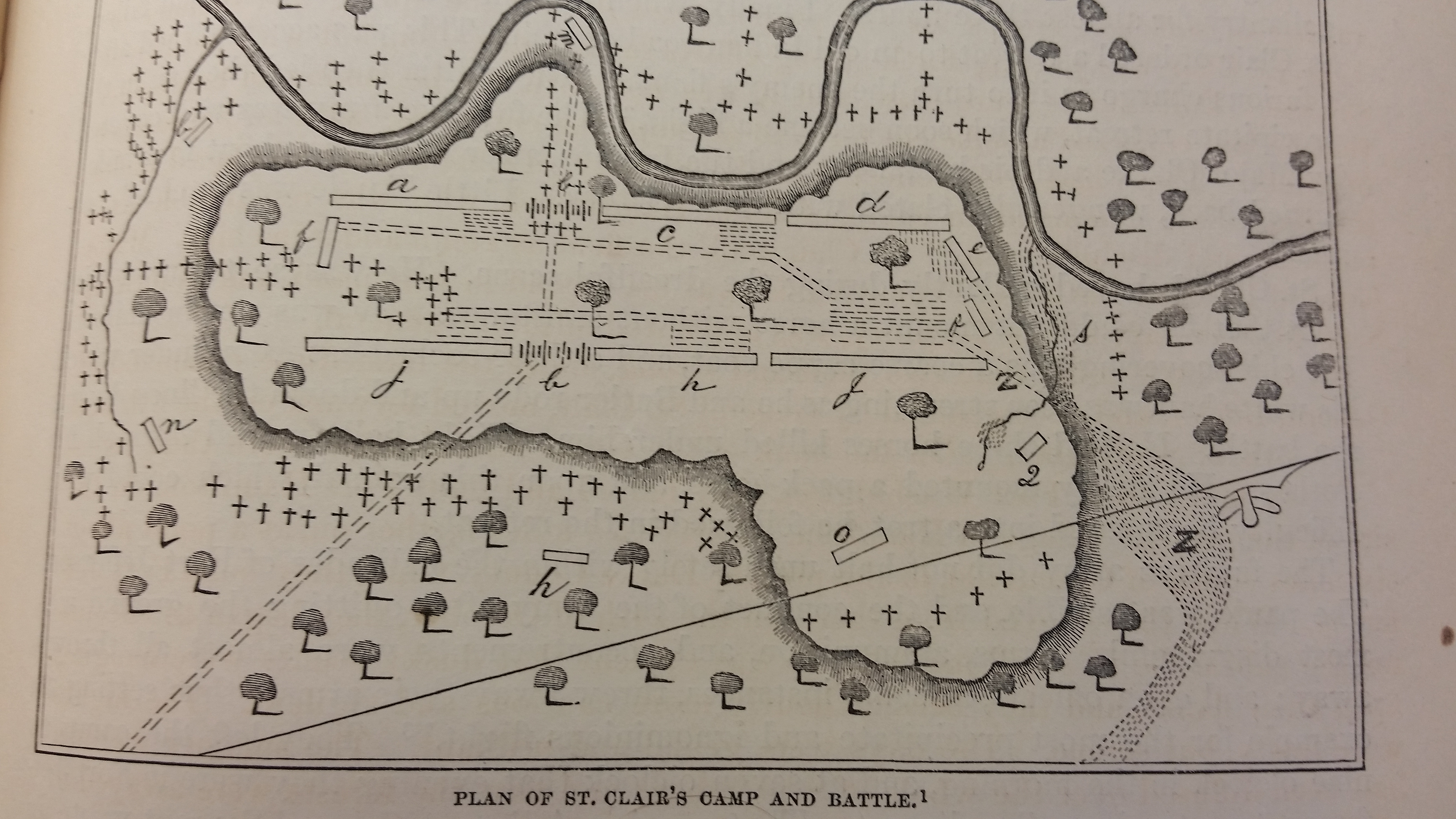
St. Clair's defeat. a-Butler's Battalion, c-Clarke's Battalion, d-Patterson's Battalion, e-Faulkner's Rifle Company, h-Gaither's Battalion, j-Beddinger's Battalion, crosses indicate the "enemy", z-"troops retreating" (north on the right)

On the evening of 3 November, St. Clair's force established a camp on a high hill near the present-day location of Fort Recovery, Ohio, near the headwaters of the Wabash River. The natives, led by Little Turtle and Blue Jacket, formed a large crescent surrounding the camp. They waited in the woods until dawn, when the Americans, distracted by preparations for breakfast, were largely unarmed. Adjutant General Winthrop Sargent had just reprimanded the militia for failing to conduct reconnaissance patrols when the natives struck, surprising the Americans and overrunning their ground.

The center, consisting of the Miami, Shawnee, and Lenape, overran the panicking militia, who fled across the Wabash and up the hill to the main camp without their weapons. The regulars immediately broke their musket stacks, formed battle lines, and fired a volley into the natives, forcing them back. The left and right wings of the Native American formation then flanked the regulars and closed in on the main camp, meeting on the far side. Within thirty minutes, the native warriors had completely encircled the U.S. camp. The regulars fought well, but their firearms and artillery were in poor condition and had little effect on the well-entrenched Native positions. An effort to place additional artillery on the hill was foiled by Native marksmen shooting down the crews as they tried to load their pieces, and the survivors were forced to spike the guns.

St. Clair was awakened half-dressed when the battle began. A group of Natives led by William Wells was specifically targeting American officers, and it is possible that St. Clair's lack of proper uniform spared his life. Nevertheless, he had two horses killed under him before he took command on foot. By this point, more than 400 soldiers and militia were killed or wounded, and half of the horses had been killed.

Women and children who accompanied the army ran to hide in the covered supply wagons. Some militia tried to join them but were forced back into battle by the women. Running low on ammunition, Darke ordered his battalion to fix bayonets and charge the central Native position. Little Turtle's forces seemingly gave way and retreated to the woods, only to encircle the exhausted levies and overpower them in brutal hand-to-hand combat. Several more bayonet charges were ordered to try and push back the Natives, but the Americans were beaten back each time before the whole force finally disintegrated.

Several survivors of St. Clair's Defeat wrote vivid accounts of their experiences during the battle. The governing boards of the Public Library of Fort Wayne and Allen County published a pamphlet, one of a historical series. The three accounts were published in 1847, 1851, and 1864, respectively.

=== Retreat ===
After three hours of fighting, St. Clair called together the remaining officers and, faced with total annihilation, decided to take their remaining men and try to break out of the Native encirclement. This meant willfully abandoning their supply wagons, the women and children, and the wounded. As before, Little Turtle's army allowed the bayonets to pass through, but this time, the Americans simply threw their guns away and ran as fast as they could to Fort Jefferson. Ebenezer Denny wrote that the Natives let the faster soldiers escape and focused instead on picking off the stragglers who couldn't keep up.

A Pennsylvania detachment under Major John Clark provided the rearguard for the retreat. When Clark was wounded, however, the detachment also lost their nerve and retreated. With no organized defense against the pursuing Natives, the retreat quickly turned into a rout. "It was, in fact, a flight", St. Clair described a few days later in a letter to Secretary of War Henry Knox. He later wrote that the route was littered with discarded firelocks, cartridge boxes, and uniforms, as the fleeing soldiers discarded any items that slowed them down. In desperation, one cook known as "Red-headed Nance" even abandoned her baby. Another account tells a similar story, where a baby abandoned in the snow by a fleeing mother was found and adopted by pursuing Natives.

Private Stephen Littell became lost in the woods and accidentally returned to the abandoned camp. He reported the remaining wounded begged him to kill them before the Natives returned from their pursuit. After they had gone about four miles, the Native warriors returned to loot the camp. Hiding beneath a tree, Littell saw them feast on the soldiers' breakfasts, strip the wagons and tents of valuables, take the abandoned women and children prisoner, and slaughter the helpless wounded.

The head of the retreat reached Fort Jefferson that evening, a distance of nearly 30 miles (48 km) in one day. With inadequate space and no food, the commander decided that those who could must continue to Fort Hamilton, another 45 miles (72 km) away. Those who couldn't move on were left in a crowded and dirty encampment with next to nothing to eat. Those who still had their horses reached Fort Hamilton the next morning, followed by those who marched on foot.

St. Clair sent a relief convoy, escorted by a hundred soldiers under Major David Ziegler, from Fort Washington on 11 November. Upon arrival at Fort Jefferson, they found 116 survivors eating "horse flesh and green hides". Charles Scott put together a force of fresh militiamen to avenge St. Clair's defeat, but bureaucratic hurdles resulted in the force lingering at Fort Washington without orders until it was finally disbanded in late November. Lieutenant Colonel James Wilkinson assumed command of the reconstituted Second Regiment in January 1792 and marched them to the now-abandoned battlefield. They sought to bury the dead and collect the missing cannons, but the task was beyond it, with "upwards of six hundred bodies" at the battle site and at least 78 bodies left scattered along the road. The exact number of wounded is not known, but it has been reported that execution fires burned for several days after the battle.

=== Casualties ===
The casualty rate was the highest percentage ever suffered by a United States Army unit and included St. Clair's second in command, Richard Butler. Of the 52 officers engaged, 39 were killed and 7 wounded; around 88% of all officers had become casualties. The American casualty rate among the soldiers was 97 percent, including 632 of 920 killed (69%) and 264 wounded. Nearly all of the 200 camp followers were killed with a few dozen taken prisoner, and a total of 832 Americans were killed. Due to its relatively small size at the time, approximately one-quarter of the entire U.S. Army had been destroyed in one day. Only 24 of the 920 men engaged came out of it unscathed. The survivors included future officeholders Benjamin Van Cleve and his uncle Robert Benham; Van Cleve was one of the few who were unharmed. Native casualties were about 61, with at least 21 killed.

So many people died on site that when 300 soldiers from the Legion of the United States arrived to establish an outpost in late 1793, they recognized the battlefield by the sheer amount of human remains, and had to clear most of them just to make space for their beds. The Legion buried remains in a mass grave. Sixty years after the battle, in September 1851, the town of Fort Recovery, Ohio organized Bone Burying Day to inter the remains of bones discovered at that location. Historian William Hogeland calls the Native American victory "the high-water mark in resistance to white expansion. No comparable Indian victory would follow."

== Aftermath ==
=== Native American response ===
The confederacy reveled in their triumph and war trophies, but the victory proved short-lived. The 1791 harvest had been insufficient in the region, and many warriors soon returned home to hunt for winter stores. A grand council was held on the banks of the Ottawa River to determine whether to continue the war against the United States or negotiate peace from a strong position. Some felt that the United States would surely beg for peace after suffering such high losses, while others argued that without further action, the Americans would simply return to keep fighting. As finding food for their villages was a much more pressing concern, the final decision was postponed until a new council could be held the following year. Little Turtle and Blue Jacket both claimed credit for being in overall command of the native forces at the victory, causing lasting resentment between the two men and their followers.

=== British response ===
The British, surprised and delighted at the success of the Natives they had been supporting and arming for years, stepped up their plans to create an Indian barrier state that would be closed to further white American settlement and encompass what was then known as the Northwest Territory. The plans were developed in Canada, but in 1794, the government in London reversed course and decided it was necessary to gain favor with the US since Britain was now at war with France and the British needed access to American foodstuffs and military stores. London put the barrier state idea on hold and opened friendly negotiations with the Americans, leading to the Jay Treaty of 1794. One provision was that the British acceded to American demands to remove their forts from American territory in Michigan and Wisconsin. Britain continued to maintain its forts in Ontario, from which Indian Department agents continued to supply munitions to Natives allied to the British.

=== United States response ===
News of the defeat reached the eastern states by late November. A French resident learned of the battle from friendly Natives and shared the news at Vincennes. From there, a traveler headed east sent word to Virginia Governor Henry Lee III, who received it along with an urgent message from Scott demanding a joint-military effort to ward off further Native incursions.

Major Denny, St. Clair's aide, carried his official report to the capital at Philadelphia. Secretary Knox himself escorted Denny to an audience with President Washington on 20 December. Washington was outraged when he received news of the defeat. After cursing St. Clair, he told Tobias Lear, "General St. Clair shall have justice. I looked hastily through the dispatches, saw the whole disaster but not all the particulars." St. Clair left James Wilkinson in charge of Fort Washington and arrived in Philadelphia in January 1792 to deliver his own account of the disaster. Blaming Quartermaster General Samuel Hodgdon for insufficient supplies, as well as the War Department, the general demanded his right to due process in a court-martial, knowing that he would likely be acquitted and thus free to resign his commission without shame. Washington, however, asked him to resign immediately and put the matter to bed. He then reappointed St. Clair as governor of the Northwest Territory.

The House of Representatives arranged for an investigation of the War Department and its handling of the campaign. It was the first Congressional Special Committee investigation, as well as the first recorded investigation of the executive branch. As part of the proceedings, the House special committee in charge of the investigation sought certain documents from the War Department. Knox brought that matter to Washington's attention, and because of the significant issues of separation of powers involved, the president summoned a meeting of all of his department heads. It was one of the first meetings of all of the officials together and may be considered the beginning of the United States Cabinet. Washington established, in principle, the position that the executive branch should refuse to divulge any papers or materials that the public good required it to keep secret and that at any rate, it was not to provide any originals. That is the earliest appearance of the doctrine of executive privilege, which later became a significant separation of powers issue.

The final committee report sided largely with St. Clair by finding that Knox, Hodgdon, and other War Department officials had done a poor job of raising, equipping, and supplying St. Clair's expedition. However, Congress then voted against a motion to consider the committee's findings, and disbanded it without issuing a final report. St. Clair later expressed disappointment that his reputation was not officially cleared.

Within weeks of learning of the disaster, Washington wrote, "We are involved in actual war!" Following up on his 1783 "Sentiments on a Peace Establishment", he requested that Congress raise an army capable of conducting a successful offense against the Northwestern Confederacy, which it did in March 1792 by establishing additional army regiments (the Legion of the United States), raising the period of enlistment for new soldiers to three years, and increasing military pay. That May, it also passed two Militia Acts. The first empowered the president to seize control of state militias without the consent of their legislators if he deemed it necessary. The second required all free, able-bodied white male citizens of the various states between the ages of 18 and 45 to enroll in militia companies, with the failure to enlist now made a federal offense. Washington would use his new authority to formally suppress the 1794 Whiskey Rebellion in western Pennsylvania.

General Richard Butler, a well-established trader, had many friends among the Seneca who mourned his death. A Seneca delegation led by Cornplanter visited General Anthony Wayne in 1793 to declare their regret for Butler's death, and a Seneca chief, Big Tree, later joined Wayne's Legion. In early 1794, he committed suicide as hostilities began to wind down.

In December 1793, the Legion of the United States built Fort Recovery at the battlefield site and spent the following months preparing to fight the Native confederacy. From 30 June to 1 July 1794, the Legion successfully defended the fort from a Native American attack. The following month, the Legion under General Wayne won a decisive victory in the Battle of Fallen Timbers. The following year, the United States and the Northwestern Confederacy negotiated the Treaty of Greenville, which used Fort Recovery as a reference point for the boundary between American and Native settlements. The treaty is considered to be the conclusion to the Northwest Indian War.

== Legacy ==
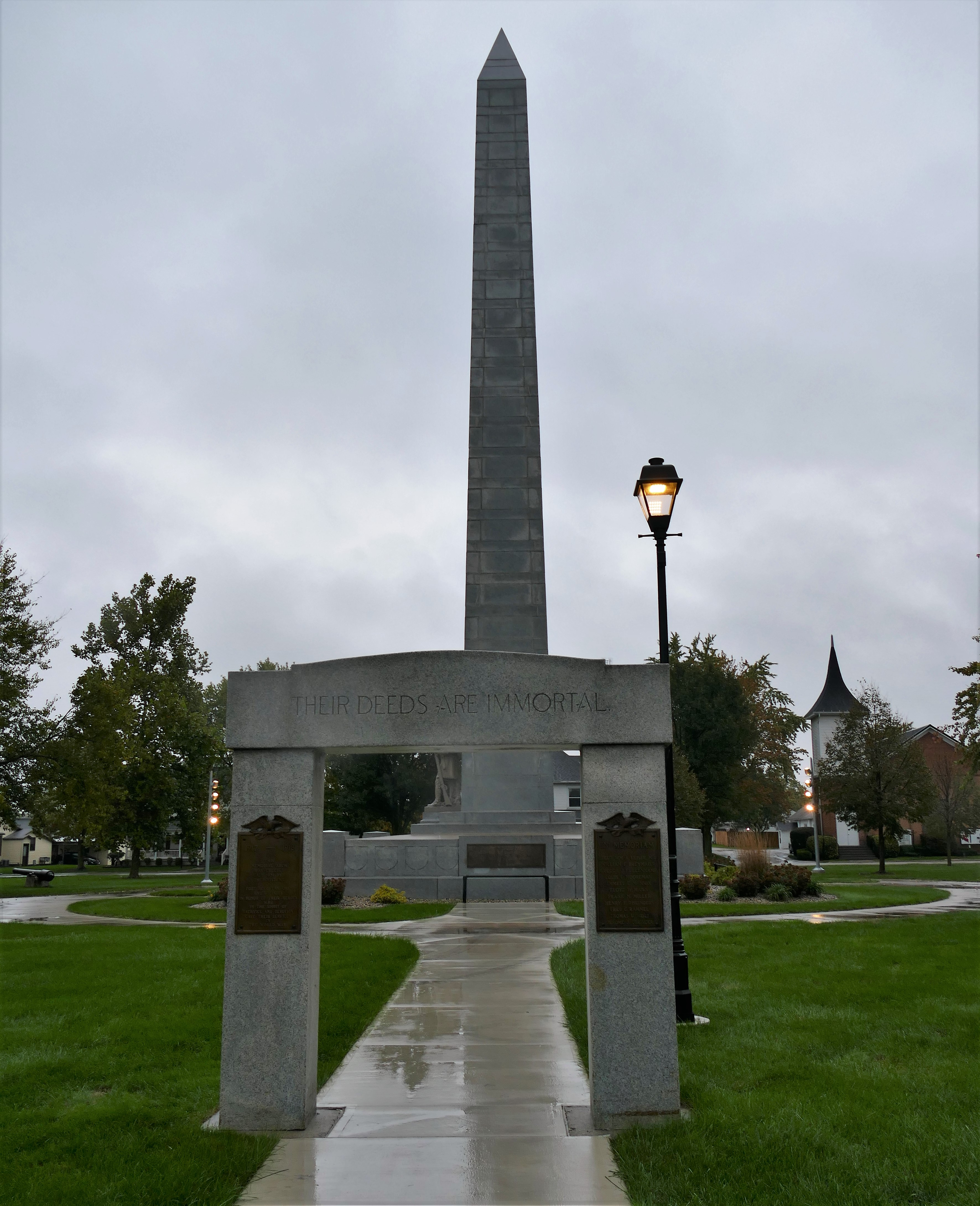
Monument to the fallen at St. Clair's Defeat in Fort Recovery, Ohio

The number of U.S. soldiers killed in St. Clair's defeat was more than three times the number the Sioux would kill 85 years later at the Battle of the Little Bighorn. Despite being one of the worst disasters in U.S. Army history, the ultimate defeat of the enemy meant the loss by St. Clair is largely forgotten. The site of the battle is currently the town of Fort Recovery, Ohio, and includes a cemetery, memorial, and museum.

One of the more significant effects of the Indian victory was the expansion of a standing, professional Army and militia reforms in the United States. The Congressional investigation into the battle also led to the establishment of executive privilege. The 1795 Treaty of Greenville used the site of St. Clair's defeat to draw a line opening most of modern Ohio to U.S. settlement. The Greenville line roughly corresponds to the contemporary Ohio-Indiana state line, slightly more than one mile (1.6 km) west of the battleground site.

=== Popular culture ===
A story was published years after the defeat of St Clair about a skeleton of Captain Roger Vanderberg and his diary that were supposedly found inside a tree in Miami County, Ohio. However, no one of that name was a casualty of the 1791 battle. The story originated in 1864 from a Scottish novel.

A folk ballad, "St. Clair's Defeat" (or "Sinclair's Defeat"), was published in the 19th century and was popular in the 1800s. It may have been based on the earlier Crawford's Defeat by the Indians. Music historian Anne Grimes cites Recollections of Persons and Places in the West by Henry M. Brackenridge, 1834, in which Brackenridge recalled hearing the song from its author, a blind poet named Dennis Loughey, at a racetrack in Pittsburgh around 1800. It was collected as a folksong in Mary O. Eddy's 1939 book Ballads and Songs from Ohio. It was recorded by Grimes on her 1957 album, Ohio State Ballads and by Bob Gibson and Hamilton Camp on their 1960 album Gibson & Camp at the Gate of Horn. It was also recorded as "St. Claire's Defeat" by the folk revival group the Modern Folk Quartet in 1964 and by Apollo's Fire in 2004.

St. Clair's defeat is, along with the 1811 Battle of Tippecanoe, a likely source for the name of the fife and drum duet "Hell on the Wabash."

== See also ==
- List of battles won by Indigenous peoples of the Americas
- Battle of the Little Bighorn
- Attacks on the United States
