= Hell on the Wabash =

19th century American folk tune

- Folk tune / March by Traditional (arranged by Dan Emmett and George Barrett Bruce)
- Other name: H--LL on the Wabash
- Genre: Folk, march, hornpipe
- Based on: "The Night We Made the Match" (Irish hornpipe)
- Published: 1862 (in The Drummer's and Fifer's Guide)
- Instrumental: Fife, drum, banjo

Hell on the Wabash is a 19th-century American folk tune, still popular with Fife and drum corps.

The tune first appeared as a banjo jig in a compilation of tunes published by Dan Emmett before 1860. Hans Nathan described Hell on the Wabash as a variant of an Irish hornpipe called “The Night We Made the Match.” Andrew Kuntz places the melody in the same family as "Hell on the Potomac" and "Wake Up Susan."

Hell on the Wabash appeared again in 1862, as a fife and drum duet in The Drummer’s and Fifer’s Guide by Emmett and George Barrett Bruce. The name was printed "H--LL on the Wabash," a possible reference to the 1779 Siege of Fort Vincennes, the 1791 destruction of the U.S. Army at St. Clair's defeat, or the 1811 Battle of Tippecanoe. Emmett, born in Ohio in 1815, would have been especially familiar with the latter two. By 1868, the phrase was known as far away as Walla Walla, Washington, where a newspaper referred to "Hell on the Wabash" as 'an exclamation frequently indulged in' 'some years ago.' The phrase was used to describe heated political tensions in the 1876 governor's race between James D. Williams and Benjamin Harrison. A writer for the South Bend, Indiana newspaper South Bend News-Times still referred to "Hell on the Wabash" as a 'popular expression' in 1914, and Congressman Finly Hutchinson Gray used the phrase in Congress as late as 1934.

As a fiddle tune, "Hell on the Wabash" was popular with midwest canal workers. Two early residents of Fort Scott, Kansas in Kansas Territory recorded that "Hell on the Wabash" was a popular dance tune at the settlement. Carl Sandburg wrote a poem about a fiddler who played the tune as a variation of Turkey in the Straw.

Frederick Fennell included Hell on the Wabash in his 1956 collection The Drummer's Heritage, as well as his 1959 album The Spirit of '76. In recent years, the tune has been associated with the United States Civil War era Iron Brigade, due to its use in the 1993 film Gettysburg.
