= Frederick Kemmelmeyer =

American painter (1755–1821)

Frederick Kemmelmeyer (c. 1755 – c. 1821) was an American painter. He was entirely self-taught and his work is generally classified as folk art.

== Life ==
His approximate birth year has been established through census records, but no birth certificate or baptismal record has been found. Naturalization papers in Annapolis, Maryland, dating from 1788, list a Frederick Kimmelmeiger, who is assumed to be him, although it is not known when or why he came to the United States. Speculation has centered around a Friedrich Kimmelmeyer who served as a medic with the Hessians during the Revolution, deserted to the Americans, and was briefly married in South Carolina, but no firm connection has been made. Soon after becoming a citizen, he placed advertisements in the Maryland Gazette and the Baltimore Advertiser, offering his services as a drawing instructor, a painter of miniatures and a sign painter. Many of his early works are copies of European lithographs and engravings.

He remained in Baltimore until 1803, when he became an itinerant portrait painter. Over the next fourteen years, his travels can be traced through his advertisements, beginning in Alexandria, Virginia, where he opened a school. Shortly after, he relocated to Georgetown. Several of his paintings from that period are portraits of George Washington or scenes from battles that feature him. By 1805, he appears to have been in Hagerstown, then went a bit further, to Chambersburg, Pennsylvania. This was followed, in 1810, by advertisements in Winchester, Virginia. Two years later, he taught and painted in what is now West Virginia. His last known advertisement appeared in 1816, in Hagerstown. A combination of age and alcoholism apparently had a serious negative effect on his ability to paint. His last years are largely undocumented. Only eleven portraits have been positively identified as his.

== Gallery ==
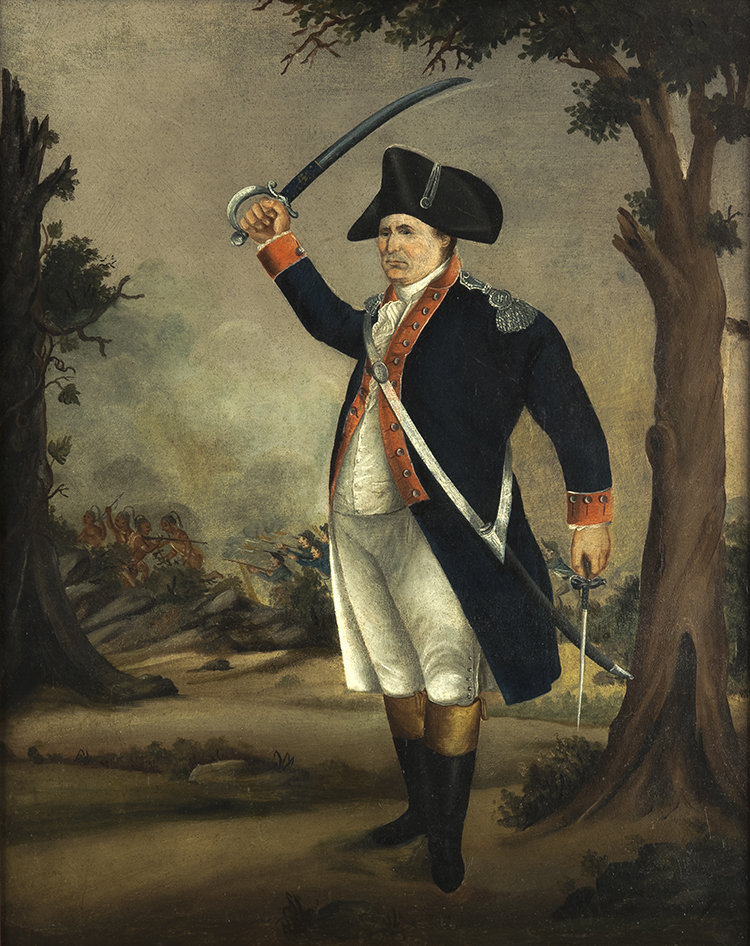
William Darke (c. 1790–1800)

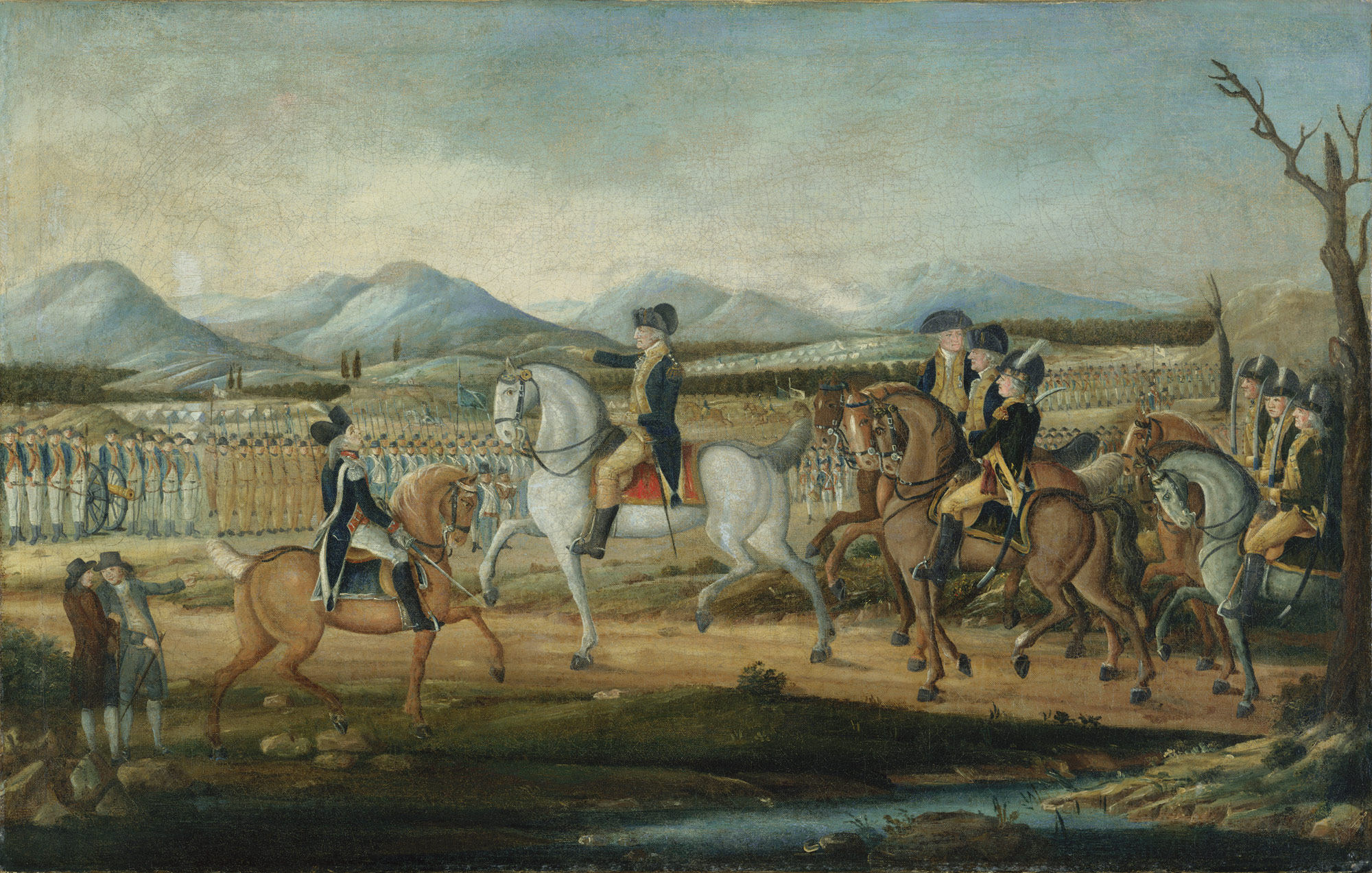
Washington Reviewing the Western Army at Fort Cumberland, Maryland (1795)

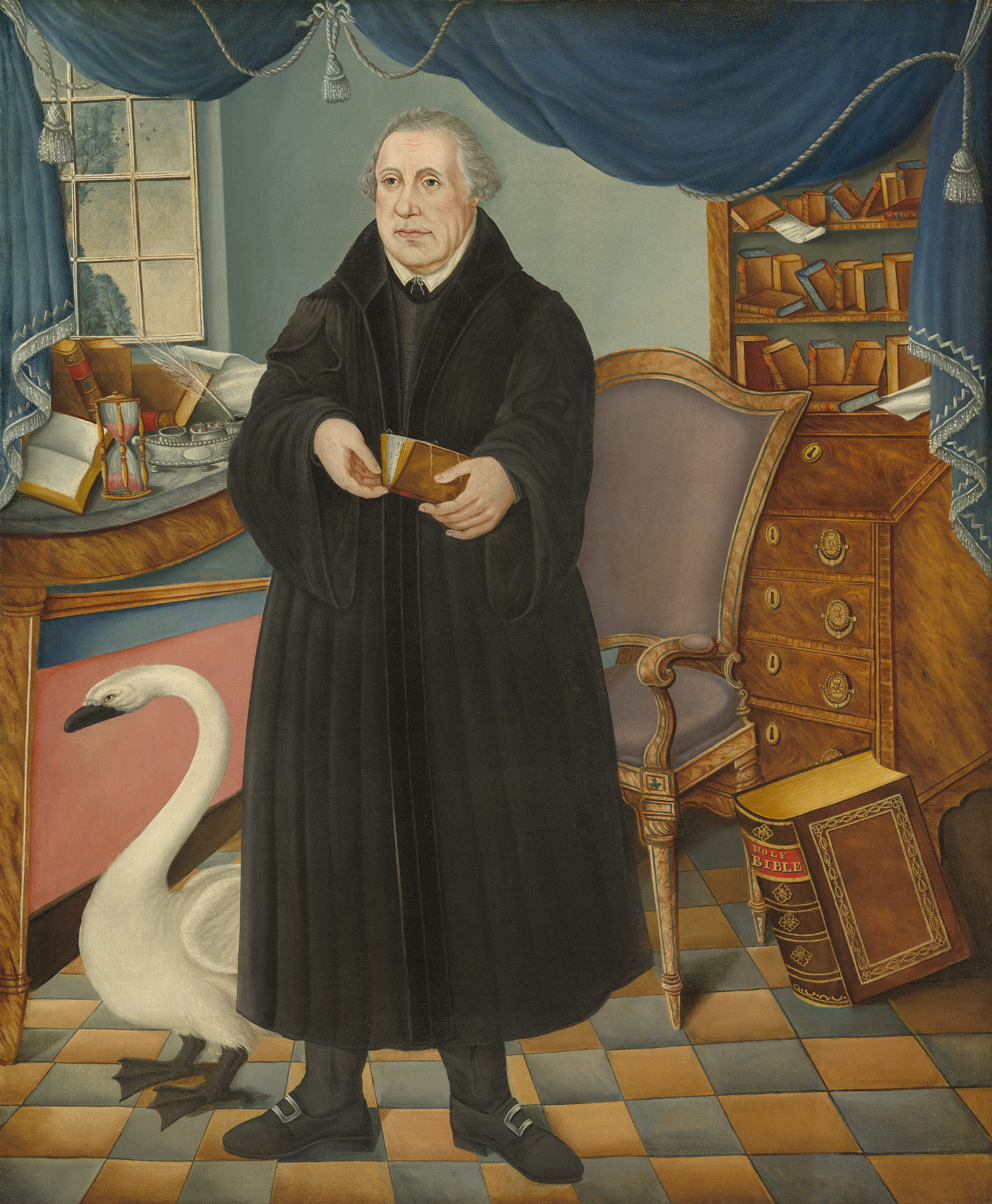
Martin Luther (c. 1800)

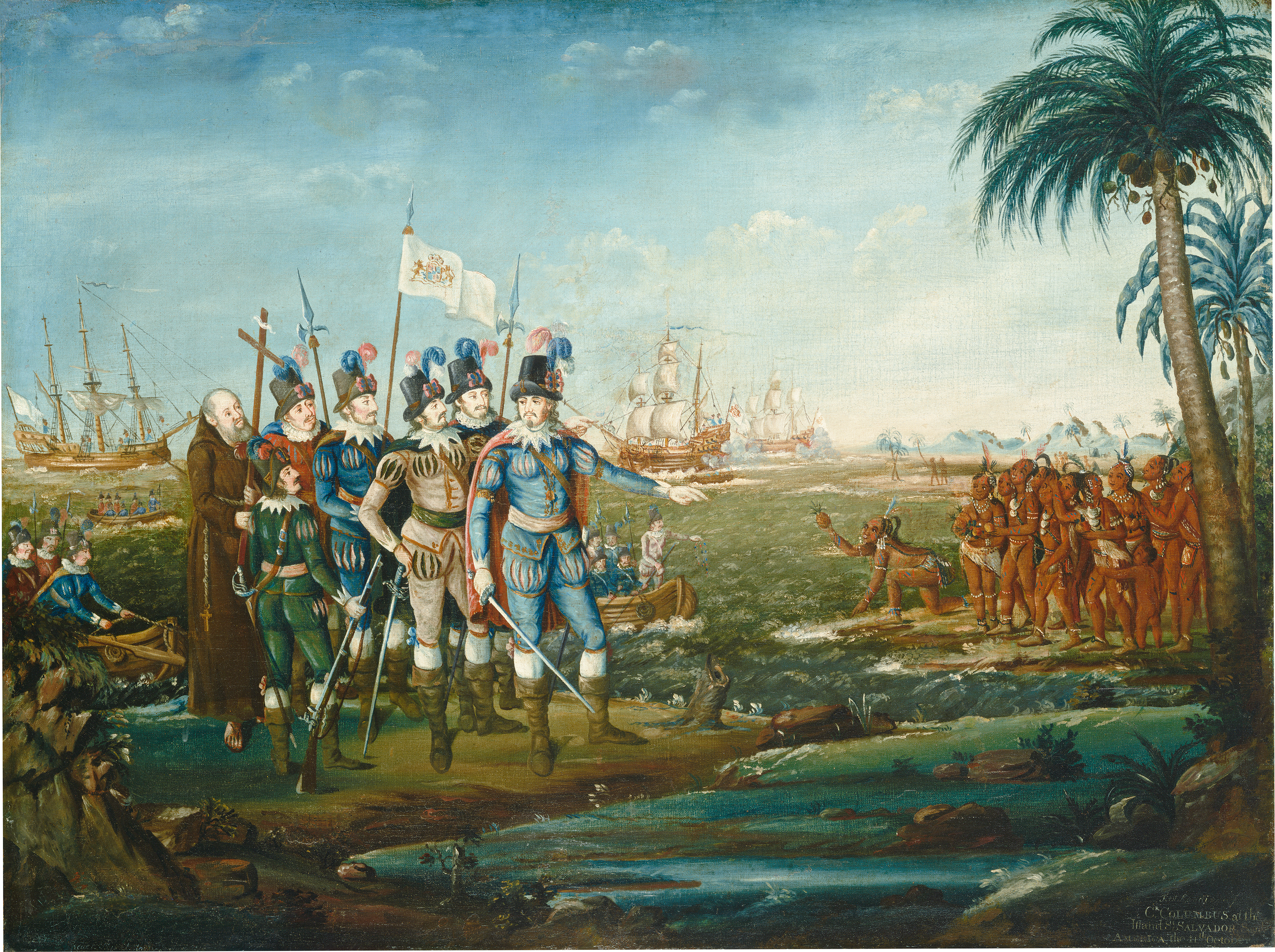
First Landing of Christopher Columbus (c. 1800–1805)

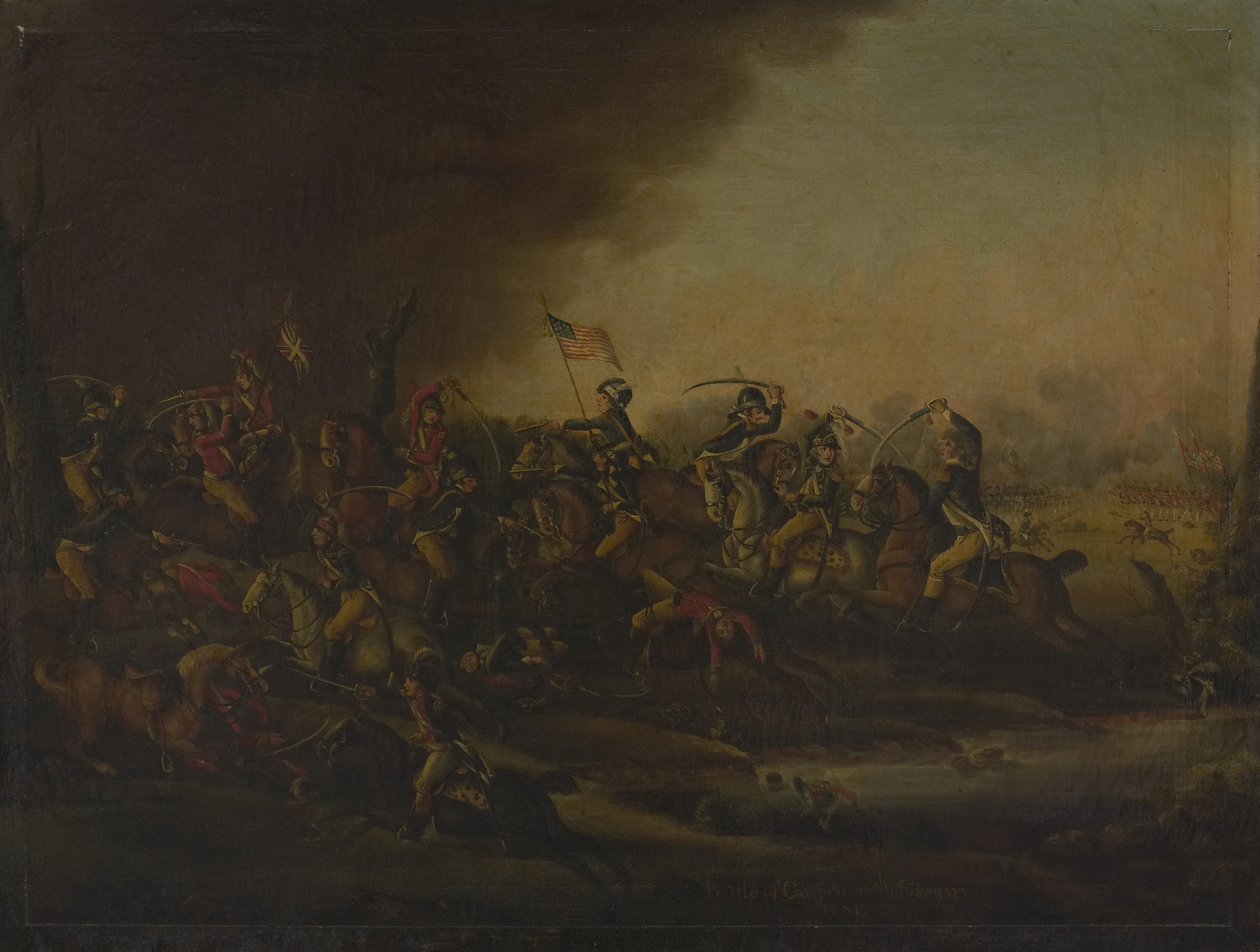
Battle of Cowpens (1809)

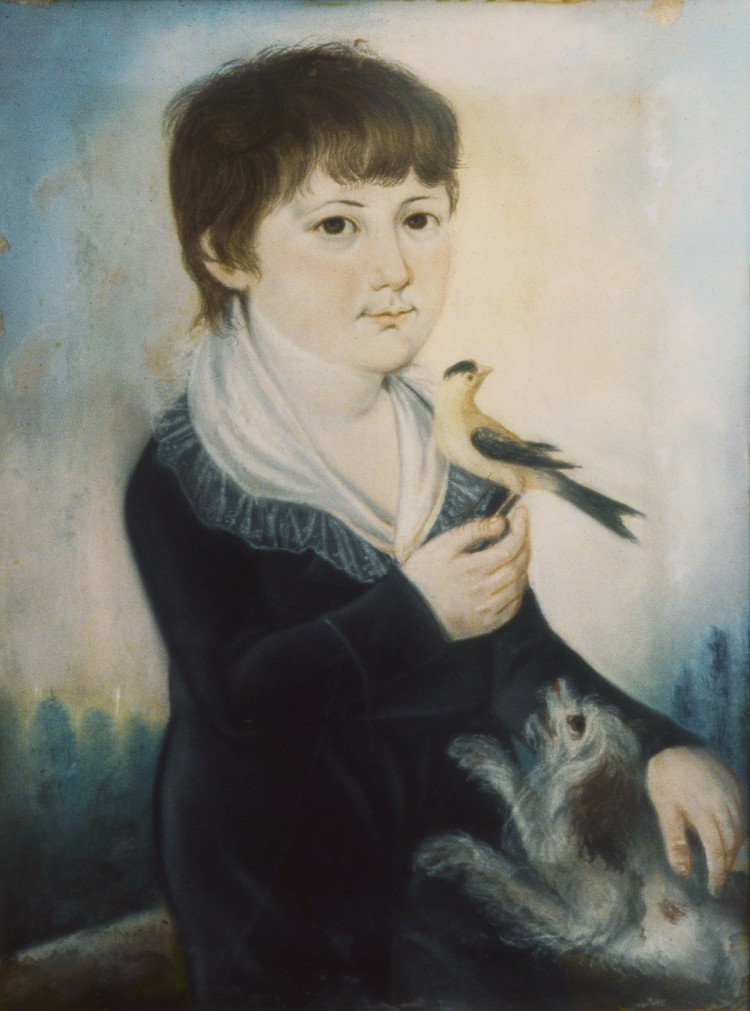
James McSherry Coale (1811)

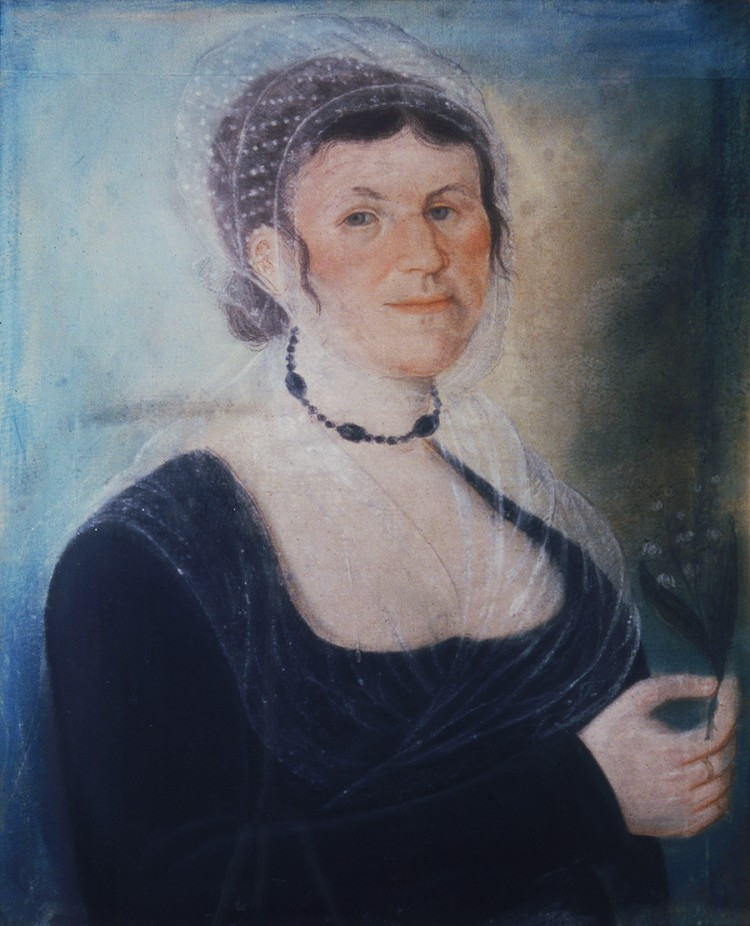
Catharina Heiser Weltzheimer (1816)
