= Robert Benham (politician) =

American politician

Captain Robert Benham (November 17, 1750 – February 6, 1809), was a frontier pioneer, served in local government and was a member of the first elected legislature for the state of Ohio, in 1799 and 1800.

== Family ==
Benham was born in Monmouth County, New Jersey, the son of Peter Benham (1724-1780) and Ann James (d. 1758). After the death of his mother, he and his siblings, John, Richard, Amey, Peter and Catherine, were taken by his father and stepmother to be baptized at the Old Tennent Church in Manalapan Township, New Jersey May 31, 1759. After the removal of his father and stepmother to Loudoun County, Virginia, Robert Benham and his siblings were reared by their maternal grandfather, Robert James. His father was a lineal descendant of John Benham who settled in Dorchester, Massachusetts in 1630 and later removed to New Haven, Connecticut where he was one of its founders. John Benham's son, Joseph, was married to Winifred King; the great great grandmother of Robert Benham who along with her daughter (also Winifred), was brought up on charges of witchcraft in 1697 in Wallingford, Connecticut.

In 1692, Winifred's mother also appeared at a preliminary trial infamously known as the Salem Witch Trials. The charges, in all three cases, were fortunately dismissed. Robert Benham and his wife, Elizabeth Miller, had ten children who were born in Pennsylvania, Ohio, and Kentucky. He was as an early settler of Washington County, Pennsylvania; Newport, Kentucky; and Hamilton County, Ohio. He later removed to Warren County, Ohio, where he died in 1809.

== Career ==
His service in connection with the military made him well-known to Colonel David Rogers, General Josiah Harmar, General Arthur St. Clair and Mad Anthony Wayne.

After leaving the military, he continued to be addressed as "Captain." People who knew him included Simon Kenton, William Henry Harrison, James O'Hara, Judge Jacob Burnet and William McMillen. His constant companion once he moved to Ohio was his nephew Benjamin Van Cleve, who established the first library in Dayton, Ohiom and was Dayton's first postmaster and a member of the Board of Trustees for Miami University in Oxford, Ohio. He died in Warren County, Ohio.

During the Revolutionary War, he served under Colonel David Rogers. An account of his near-death experience in 1778 was preserved by his fellow survivor, Basil Brown, who related it to Lyman Draper in the 1820s.

Benham was a member of the first Ohio Territorial Legislature. He worked with a small group Democratic-Republicans to overcome the governor's efforts to delay Ohio becoming a state.

== His Life ==
His adventures were written about by many, including Henry Howe, President Teddy Roosevelt and the 1921 Year Book of the Boy Scouts of America. His son, Joseph Benham, continued to serve in the tradition of his father.

Theodore Roosevelt wrote in The Winning of the West; "A still more remarkable event had occurred a couple summers previously (October 4, 1779). Some keel boats, manned by a hundred men under (Colonel) Lieutenant(David) Rogers, and carrying arms and provisions procured from the Spaniards at New Orleans (from Governor Galvez and American Agent Oliver Pollock ), were set upon by an Indian war party under (Simon) Girty and Elliot while drawn upon a sand beach of the Ohio (later known as Manhattan Beach, Dayton, Kentucky.) The boats were captured and plundered, most of the men were killed; several escaped, two under very extraordinary circumstances. One had both his arms, the other both legs, broken. For weeks the two crippled beings lived in the lonely spot where the battle had been fought, unable to leave it, each supplementing what the other could do. The man who could walk (Basil Brown) kicked wood to him who could not (Captain Benham), that he might make a fire, making long circuits, chase the game toward him to shoot it. At last they were taken off a passing flat boat" (and returned to the fort opposite the Falls of the Ohio. Among those captured by the war party and carried away was Colonel John Campbell who had joined the Americans only a few days before.)
