= Fort Wayne, Indiana =

Fort Wayne
- City
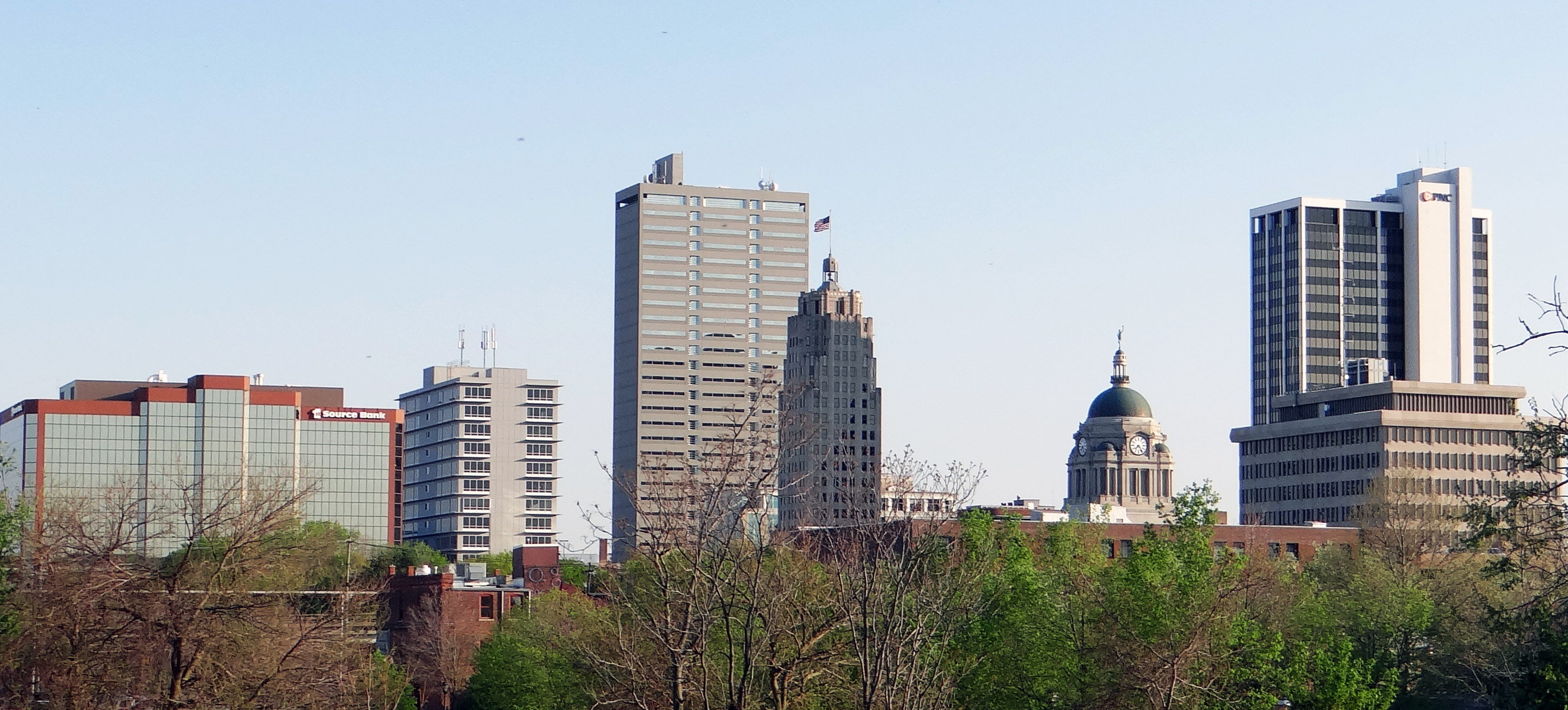
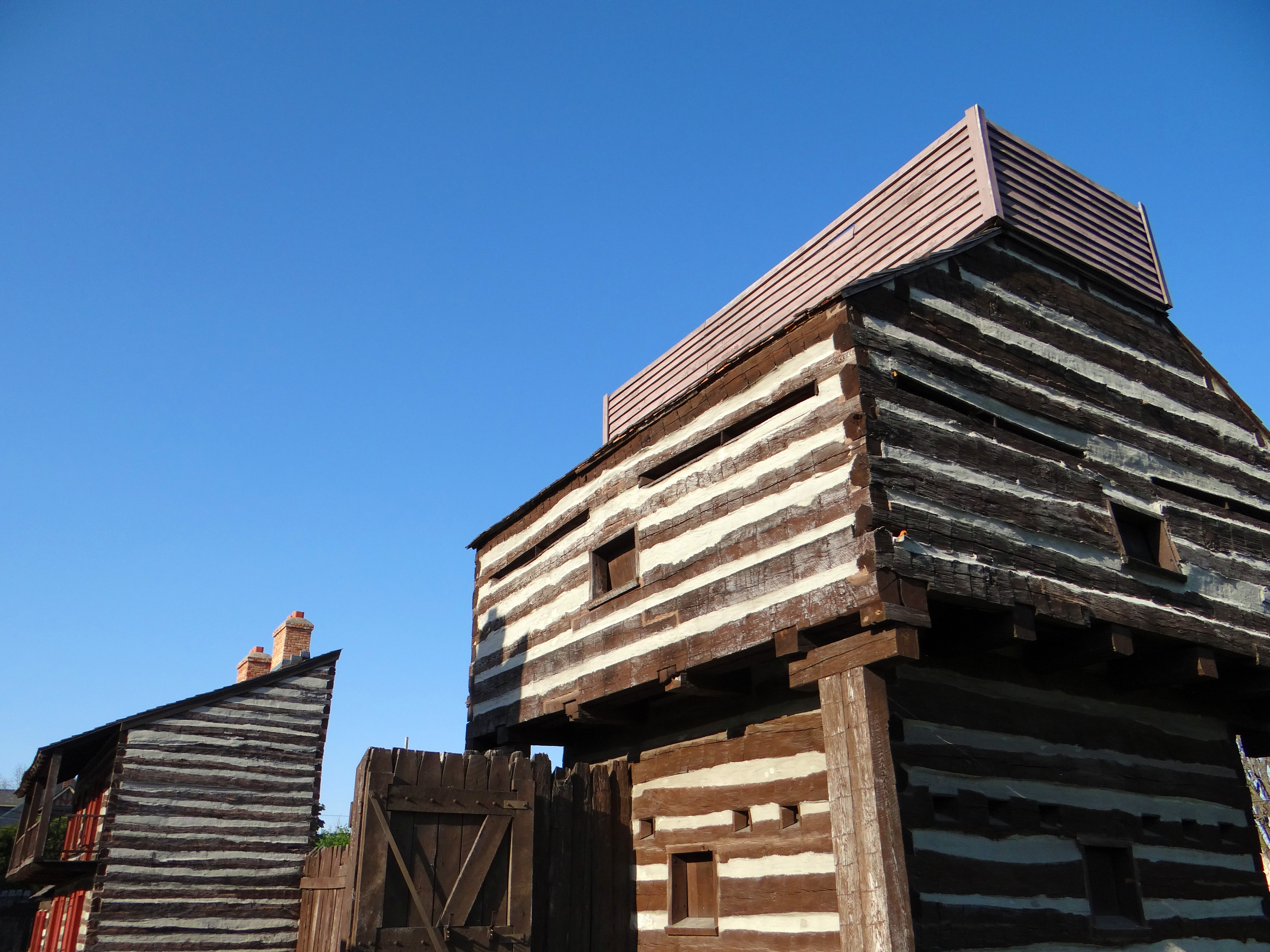
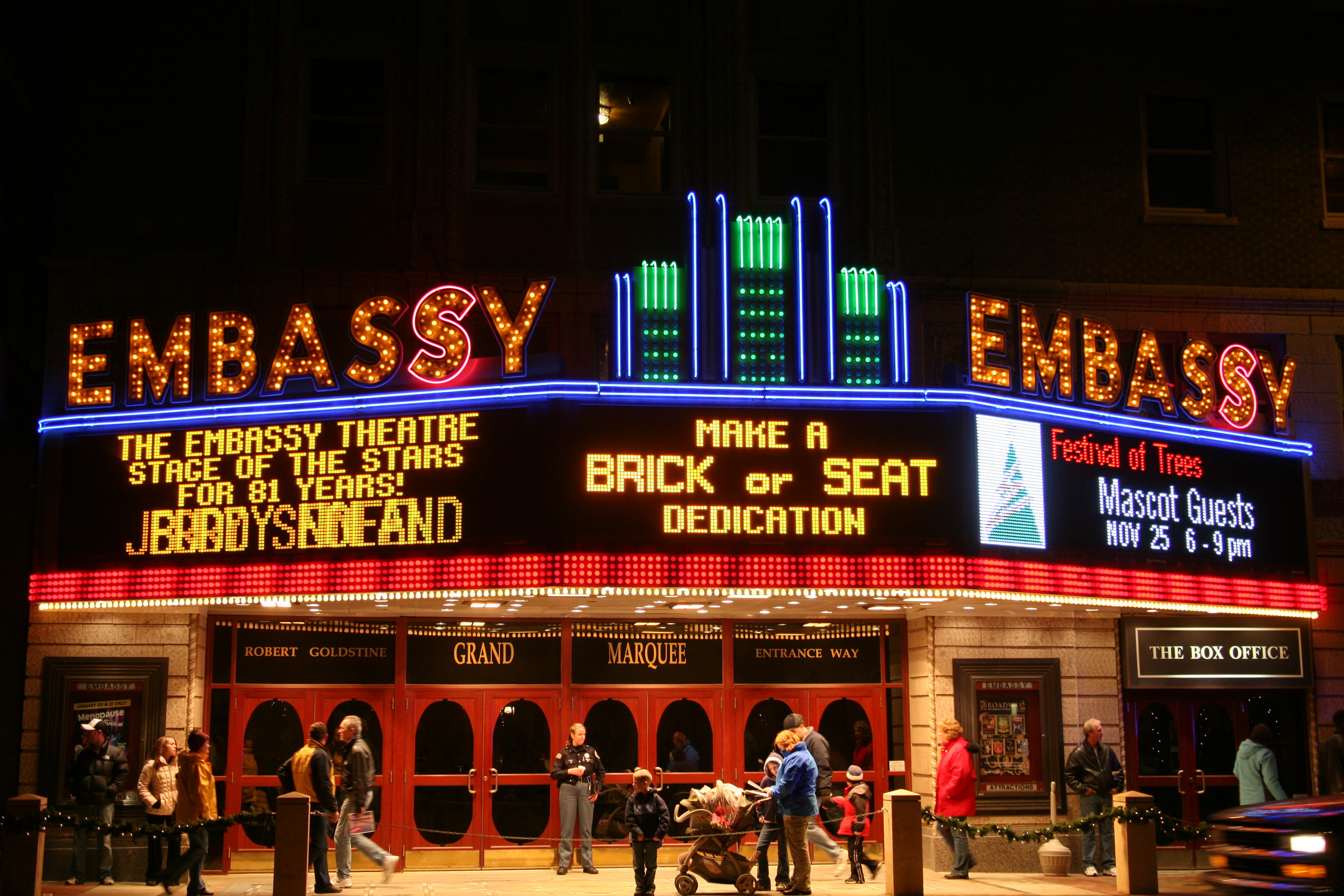
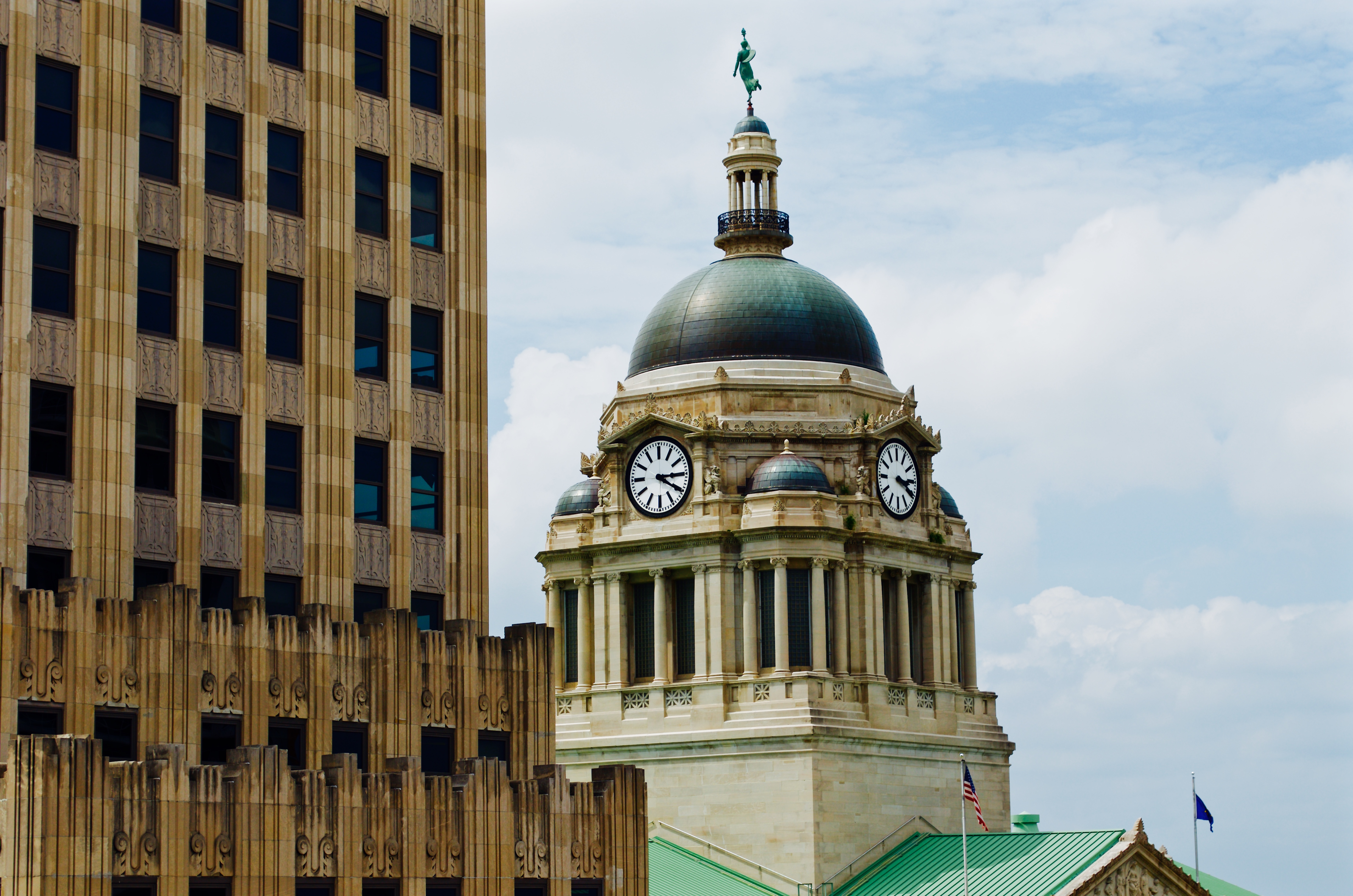
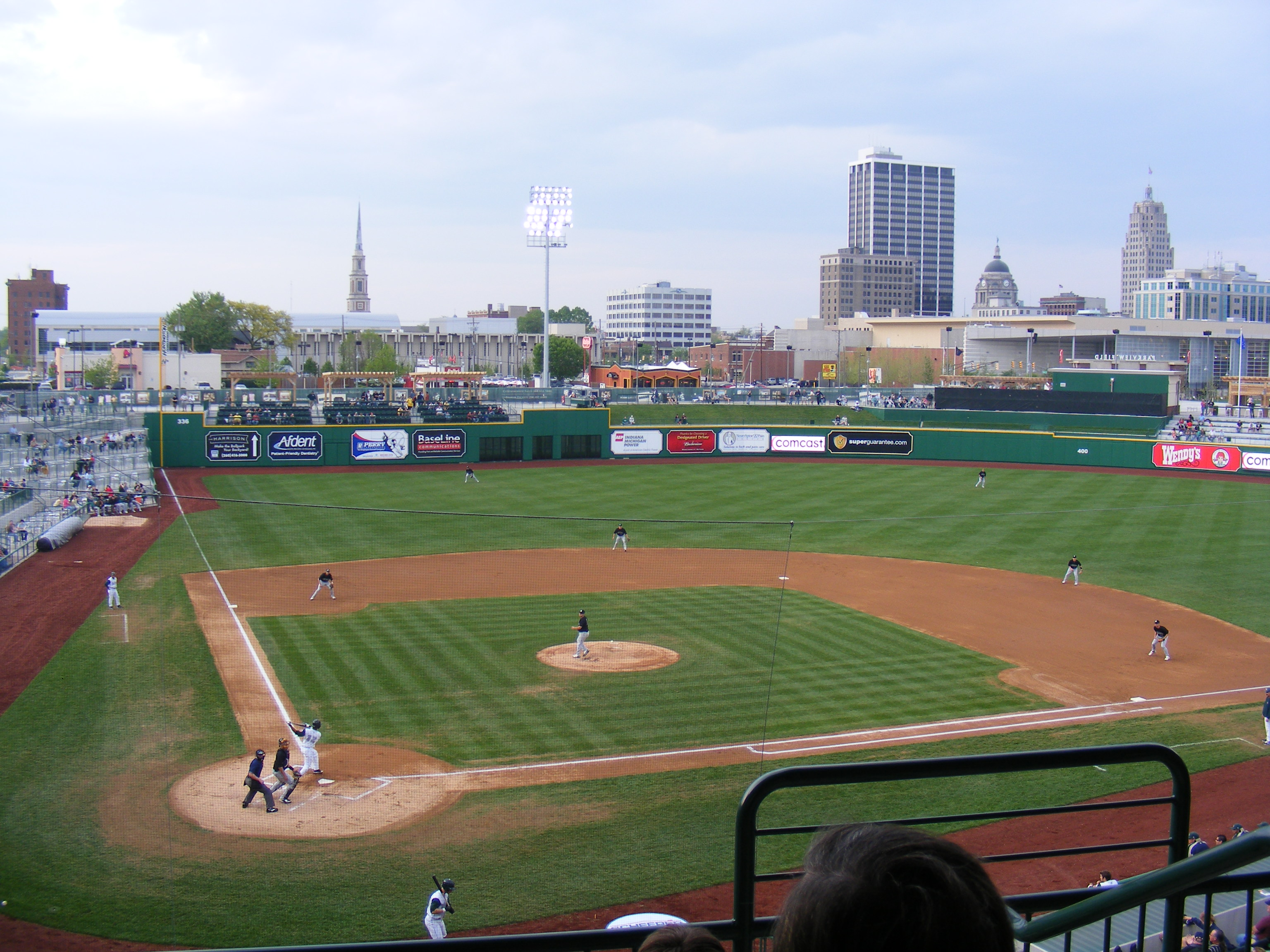
- Downtown Fort Wayne Historic Fort Wayne Embassy Theatre Allen County Courthouse and Lincoln Bank Tower Parkview Field

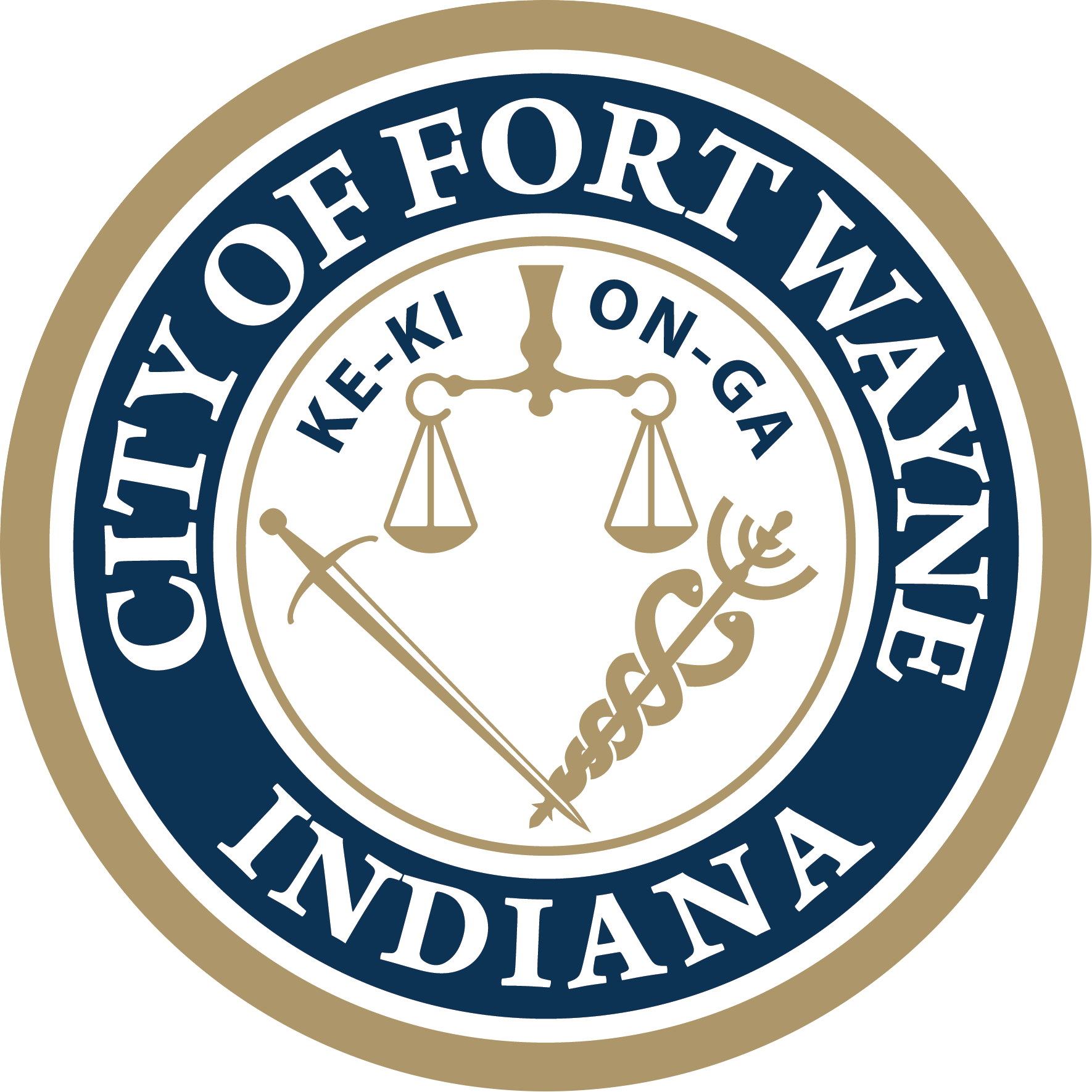
- Flag Seal
- Nicknames: "Summit City"; "City of Churches"; "City That Saved Itself"; "Magnet Wire Capital of the World"
- Motto: Kekionga
- Interactive map of Fort Wayne
- Location within Indiana Location within the United States
- Coordinates: 41°4′50″N 85°8′21″W
- Country: United States
- State: Indiana
- County: Allen
- Townships: Aboite; Adams; Perry; Pleasant; Saint Joseph; Washington; Wayne
- Founding: October 22, 1794
- Incorporated (town): January 3, 1829
- Incorporated (city): February 22, 1840
- Founder: Jean François Hamtramck
- Named for: Anthony Wayne

Government
  - Type: Mayor–council
  - Mayor: Sharon Tucker (D)
  - Body: Fort Wayne City Council

Area
  - City: 110.79 sq mi (286.95 km^{2})
  - Land: 110.57 sq mi (286.38 km^{2})
  - Water: 0.22 sq mi (0.56 km^{2}) 0.19%
  - Urban: 135.25 sq mi (350.3 km^{2})
  - Metro: 1,368 sq mi (3,540 km^{2})
- Elevation: 758 ft (231 m)

Population (2020)
  - City: 263,886
  - Estimate (2025): 275,203 ▲
  - Rank: 1st in Allen County; 1st in Northern Indiana; 2nd in Indiana; 83rd in United States
  - Density: 2,386.6/sq mi (921.45/km^{2})
  - Urban: 335,934 (US: 121st)
  - Urban density: 2,053/sq mi (792.8/km^{2})
  - Metro: 423,038 (US: 130th)
  - CSA: 667,403 (US: 80th)
- Demonym: Fort Wayner
- Time zone: UTC−05:00 (EST)
  - Summer (DST): UTC−04:00 (EDT)
- ZIP Codes: ZIP codes: 46802–46809, 46814–46816, 46818, 46819, 46825, 46835, 46845, 46850
- Area code: 260
- FIPS code: 18-25000
- GNIS feature ID: 2394798
- Website: cityoffortwayne.in.gov

Fort Wayne is a city in Allen County, Indiana, United States, and its county seat. Located in northeastern Indiana, the city is 18 miles (29 km) west of the Ohio border and 50 miles (80 km) south of the Michigan border. The city's population was 263,886 at the 2020 census, making it the 2nd-most populous city in Indiana after Indianapolis, and the 82nd-most populous city in the U.S. The Fort Wayne metropolitan area, consisting of Allen, Wells and Whitley counties, has an estimated population of 463,000. Fort Wayne is the cultural and economic center of northeastern Indiana.

Fort Wayne was built in 1794 by the United States Army under the direction of American Revolutionary War general Anthony Wayne, the last in a series of forts built near the Miami village of Kekionga. Named in Wayne's honor, the European-American settlement developed at the confluence of the St. Joseph, St. Marys, and Maumee rivers, known originally as Fort Miami, a trading post constructed by Jean Baptiste Bissot, Sieur de Vincennes around 1706. The modern city was platted in 1823 following its revitalization after the War of 1812 and its siege. It underwent tremendous growth after completion of the Wabash and Erie Canal and advent of the railroad.

Once a booming manufacturing town located in what became known as the Rust Belt, Fort Wayne's economy in the 21st century is based upon distribution, transportation and logistics; healthcare, professional and business services; leisure and hospitality, and financial services. Home to the Fort Wayne Air National Guard Base, the city is a center for the defense industry, which employs 1–2% of the population. Fort Wayne was an All-America City Award recipient in 1983, 1998, 2009, and 2021. The city also received an Outstanding Achievement City Livability Award by the U.S. Conference of Mayors in 1999.

== History ==
=== Early history ===
==== The Native Americans and New France ====
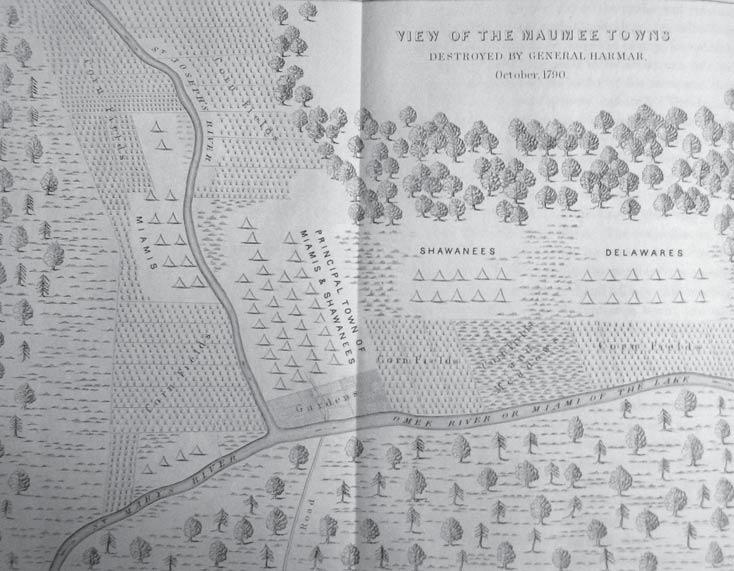
An illustrated 1789 map of Kekionga

==== Original settlement and French control (1706-1760) ====
This area here on the river confluence was occupied by successive cultures of indigenous peoples for as long as 10,000 years. The Miami tribe would eventually establish its settlement of Kekionga at this confluence of the Maumee, St. Joseph, and St. Marys rivers in the late stages of the Beaver Wars in the 1690s. It was the capital of the Miami nation and related Algonquian tribes. (Note: According to J. Dunn, Jr., this name was "usually said to mean "blackberry patch," or "blackberry bush," this plant being considered an emblem of antiquity because it sprang up on the sites of old villages. This theory rests on the testimony of Barron, a longtime French trader on the Wabash. It is more probable that Kekionga is a corruption or dialect form of Kiskakon, or Kikakon, which was the original name of the place." J. P. Dunn. But, Michael McCafferty, an Algonquian and Uto-Aztecan linguist professor at Indiana University, exhaustively examined the etymology of 'Kekionga' and dismissed Dunn's explanation and several others. See the chapter "Trails to Kekionga" in the relevantly titled Native American Place Names of Indiana (Urbana and Chicago: University of Illinois Press, 2008), esp. p. 76. In the 1680s, French traders established a post near Kekionga due to its location on a portage between the Great Lakes and Mississippi River.)

In 1696, Comte de Frontenac appointed Jean Baptiste Bissot, Sieur de Vincennes, who began visiting Kekionga in 1702, and would later build the original Fort Miami here in the wilderness and pays d'en Haut of New France around 1706; Initially, a small trading outpost. It was part of a group of forts and trading posts built between Quebec and St. Louis. The first census in 1744 recorded a population of approximately 40 Frenchmen and 1,000 Miamians.

==== From the British back to the Miami (1760-1776) ====
Increasing tension between France and Great Britain developed over control of the territory. In 1760, France ceded the area to Britain after its forces in North America surrendered during the Seven Years' War, known on the North American front as the French and Indian War. Managing to hold down the fort for only a mere couple of years, the British lost control of it in 1763 when various Native American nations rebelled against British rule and retook the fort as part of Pontiac's Rebellion. From this point forward in 1763, no active fort existed at Kekionga for the next three decades until American General Anthony Wayne established Fort Wayne in 1794, following the Battle of Fallen Timbers. The fort throughout this period was described as a, "Defiant mixture of Indian warriors and lawless renegades of the frontier, such as the Girties. It was also the home of a heterogeneous population of English and French traders and their families, French 'engages", and Miami, Delaware and Shawnee tribes."

In 1772, the British regained influence over the village after Sir William Johnson suggested to the government that the fort be reoccupied. The mixed population of the Kekionga area had moved past antipathy with the British by this point, and accepted their friendship. In 1776, Officer Jacques LaSalle moved into the village to conduct strict supervision on behalf of the British government, ensuring that the natives remained loyal to the British, and to check passports with travelers coming down from Fort Detroit.

==== American Revolution to the Old Northwest ====
The British continued to monitor Kekionga and Fort Miami throughout the American Revolutionary War. In 1780, French Canadian soldiers coming to assist the U.S. with the revolution were slaughtered in several nearby locations in what is known as La Balme's Defeat. At the end of the Revolutionary War, in the Treaty of Paris in 1783, Britain ceded this area to the new United States, though they continued to maintain an influence on trading activity and the forts of Miami, with the primary objective of slowing American expansion into the Great Lakes region. The young United States formally organized the region in the Land Ordinance of 1785 and negotiated treaties allowing settlement, but the Western Confederacy of Native American nations were not party to these treaties and did not cede their ownership of those lands.

American land speculators and pioneers began flooding down the Ohio River into the area, leading to conflict with an alliance of native tribes known as the Western Confederacy. It was headquartered at Kekionga, where the Miami had permitted two refugee tribes dislodged by white homesteaders, the Delaware and the Shawnee, to resettle. The confederacy—which included other Great Lakes tribes as well—began sending war parties to raid settlers, hoping to drive them back across the Appalachian Mountains, and refused to meet for negotiations over a possible treaty to instead cede land for white settlement. The growing violence led to the Northwest Indian War.

In 1790, President George Washington ordered the U.S. Army to subdue and pacify the tribes. The first expedition, led by General Josiah Harmar reached Kekionga and exercised scorched earth tactics on the village and crops. Miami war chief Little Turtle, who had been long tracking the whereabouts of Harmar though the aid of various agents such as Simon Girty, would quickly drive Harmar and the US troops away. The confederacy warriors attacked the second invading force, led in 1791 by General Arthur St. Clair, before it could get that far and wiped it out, in a massacre known as St. Clair's Defeat at modern-day Fort Recovery, Ohio. It's known as the greatest defeat of the U.S. Army by Native Americans in history. This defeat left the US army crippled and borders open to attacks from the British and allied native tribes. General Anthony Wayne was recalled from civilian life to lead a third expedition, defeating the confederacy's warriors at the Battle of Fallen Timbers, near modern-day Toledo, Ohio on August 20, 1794. Wayne's men then marched up the Maumee River, systematically burning evacuated native towns, crops, and winter food stores, until they reached its headwaters, where Kekionga remained in ruins. Wayne then confronted the British at Fort Miami, where the British debated an attack. Later, Wayne selected the site for construction of Fort Wayne. He ordered a fort that could withstand heavy British artillery, especially a 24-pound cannon, along with attacks from their army or native allies.

The following year, Wayne negotiated a peace accord, the Treaty of Greenville with tribal leaders, in which they agreed to stop fighting, end support of the British, and ceded most of what is now Ohio along with certain tracts further west, including the area around Fort Wayne encompassing Kekionga and the land portage. Wayne promised the remainder would remain Indian lands, which is why the territory west of Ohio was named Indiana. Wayne would die one year later and a Spanish spy James Wilkinson would assume his role as General. In subsequent years, the government used Fort Wayne to hand out annual payments under the treaty. But in a recurring cycle, the tribes ran up debts to white traders who came there to sell them alcohol and manufactured goods, and the government pushed tribal leaders—including through bribes—to sell more reservation land to pay off those debts and, when the land was gone, then to agree to have the tribe removed to the Far West.

In 1802, a United States fur trade factory was established in Fort Wayne. It was burned by the local Native Americans at the beginning of the War of 1812.

==== Settlement permitted by Treaty of St. Mary's ====
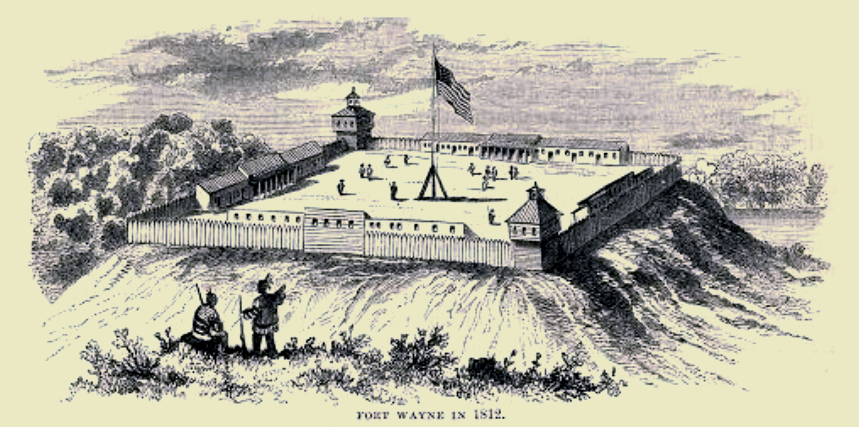
Illustration depicting the 1812 military garrison

The first settlement started in 1815. In 1819, the military garrison abandoned the fort and moved to Detroit. In 1822, a federal land office opened to sell land ceded by local Native Americans by the Treaty of St. Mary's in 1818. Platted in 1823 at the Ewing Tavern, the village became an important frontier outpost and was incorporated as the Town of Fort Wayne in 1829, with a population of 300. The Wabash and Erie Canal's opening improved travel conditions to the Great Lakes and Mississippi River, exposing Fort Wayne to expanded economic opportunities. The population topped 2,000 when the town was incorporated as the City of Fort Wayne on February 22, 1840.

Pioneer newspaperman George W. Wood was elected the city's first mayor. Fort Wayne's "Summit City" nickname dates from this period, referring to the city's position at the highest elevation along the canal's route. As influential as the canal was to the city's earliest development, it quickly became obsolete after briefly competing with the city's first railroad, the Pittsburgh, Fort Wayne and Chicago Railway, completed in 1854.

=== Modern history ===
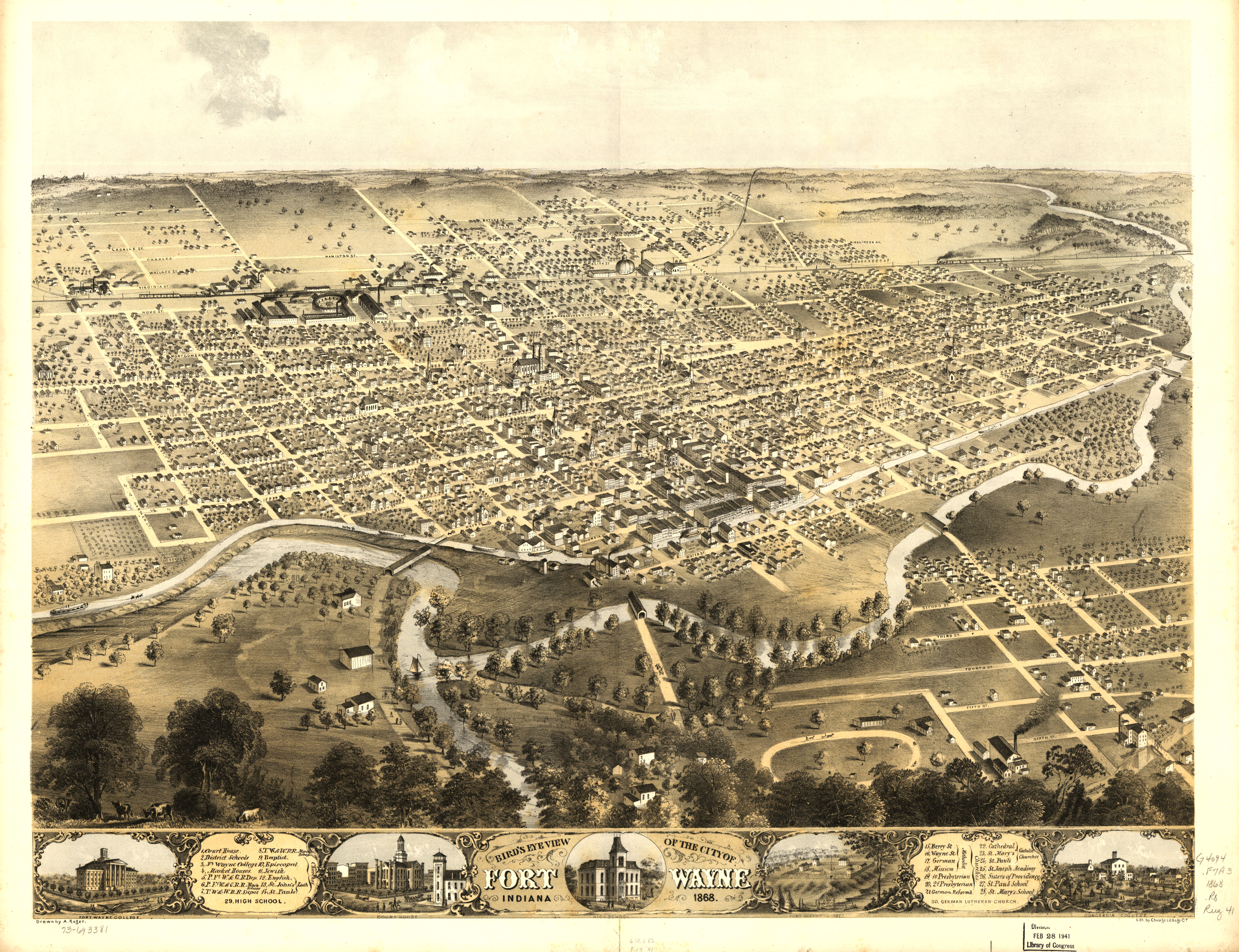
A lithograph of Fort Wayne (1868)

At the turn of the 20th century, the population of Fort Wayne nearly reached 50,000, attributed to a large influx of German and Irish immigrants. Fort Wayne's "urban working class" thrived in industrial and railroad-related jobs. The city's economy was substantially based on manufacturing, ushering in an era of innovation with several notable inventions and developments coming out of the city over the years, such as gasoline pumps (1885), the refrigerator (1913), and in 1972, the first home video game console. The Great Flood of 1913 caused seven deaths, left 15,000 homeless, and damaged over 5,500 buildings in the worst natural disaster in the city's history.

As the automobile's prevalence grew, Fort Wayne became a fixture on the Lincoln Highway. Aviation arrived in 1919 with the opening of the city's first airport, Smith Field. The airport served as Fort Wayne's primary commercial airfield until Baer Field (now Fort Wayne International Airport) was transferred to the city in 1947 after serving as a military base during World War II.

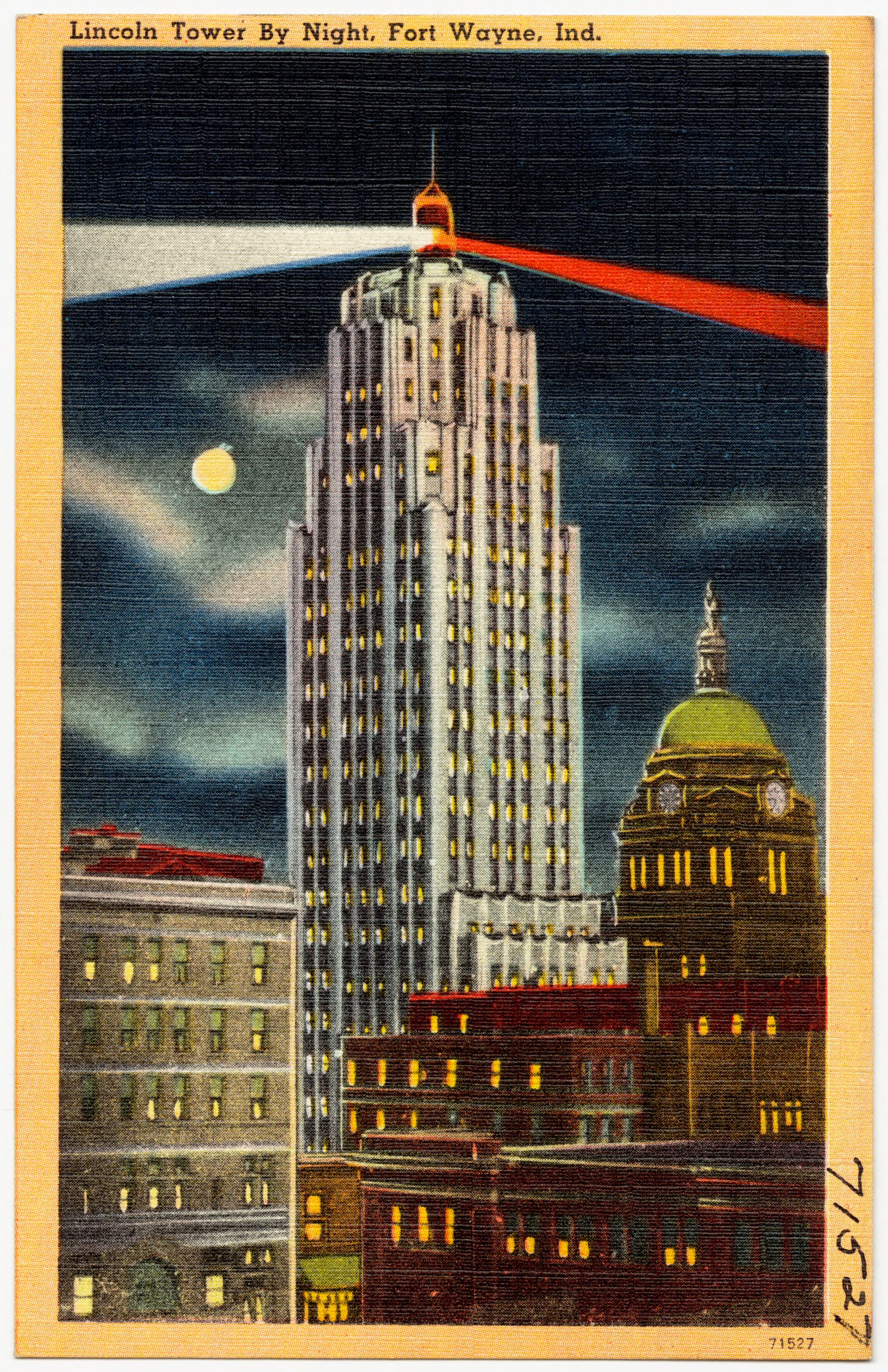
Lincoln Bank Tower, completed as Indiana's tallest building, in 1930

Fort Wayne was hit by the Great Depression beginning in 1929, with most factories cutting their workforce. The stock market crash did not discourage plans to build the city's first skyscraper and Indiana's tallest building at the time, the Lincoln Bank Tower. By 1935, the New Deal's WPA put over 7,000 residents back to work through local infrastructure improvements, including the construction of new parks, bridges, viaducts, and a $5.2 million sewage treatment facility.

The post-World War II economic boom helped the city prosper once again. Between 1950 and 1955, more than 5,000 homes were built, many in large subdivisions in rural Allen County. In 1950, Fort Wayne's first bypass, Coliseum Boulevard, opened on the north side of the city, followed by the city's first arena, War Memorial Coliseum, bringing new opportunities for suburban expansion. The Coliseum was home to the NBA's Fort Wayne Pistons from 1952 to 1957. The opening of enclosed shopping malls and the construction of Interstate 69 through rural areas north and west of the city proper further drove the exodus of retail from downtown through the 1960s. According to the Fort Wayne Home Builders Association estimates, more than 80 percent of new home construction occurred outside the city proper in the 1970s.

Like many cities in the Rust Belt, deindustrialization in the 1980s brought urban blight, increased crime, and a decrease in blue-collar manufacturing jobs. Downtown and surrounding neighborhoods continued declining as residents and businesses sprawled further into rural Allen County. A 1982 flood forced an evacuation of 9,000 residents, damaging 2,000 buildings, and costing $56.1 million (1982 USD, $137 million 2015 USD), prompting a visit from then president of the United States, Ronald Reagan.

In the 1990s, the city began a turnaround. Local leaders focused on crime reduction, economic diversification, and downtown redevelopment. By 1999, Fort Wayne's crime rate decreased to the lowest levels since 1974, and the city's economy recovered, with the unemployment rate hovering at 2.4 percent in 1998. Clearing blighted buildings downtown resulted in new public greenspaces, including Headwaters Park, which has become the premier community gathering space and centerpiece in the city's $50 million flood control project. Fort Wayne celebrated its bicentennial in 1994.

The city continued to concentrate on downtown redevelopment and investment in the 2000s. The decade saw the beginnings of its transformation, with renovations and expansions of the Allen County Public Library, Grand Wayne Convention Center, and Fort Wayne Museum of Art. In 2007, the $130 million Harrison Square development was launched, creating Parkview Field. Suburban growth continued, with the opening of Fort Wayne's first lifestyle center, Jefferson Pointe, and the half-billion dollar Parkview Regional Medical Center in 2012.

== Geography ==
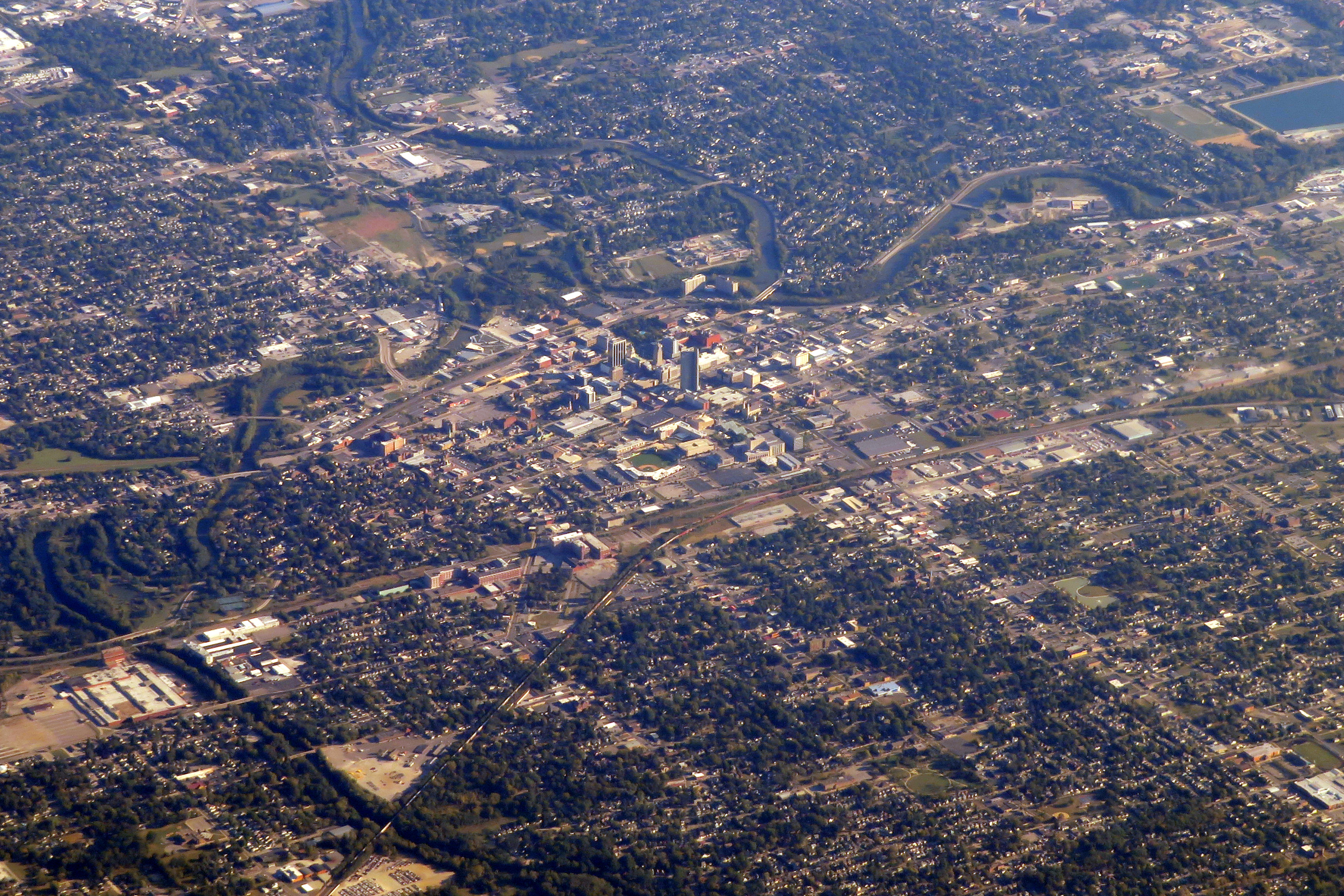
Aerial of Fort Wayne in 2019

Fort Wayne is in the East North Central region of the Midwestern United States, in northeastern Indiana, 18 miles (29 km) west of Ohio and 50 miles (80 km) south of Michigan. According to the 2010 census, Fort Wayne has a total area of 110.834 square miles (287.06 km^{2}), of which 110.62 square miles (286.50 km^{2}) (or 99.81%) is land and 0.214 square miles (0.55 km^{2}) (or 0.19%) is water.

=== Topography ===
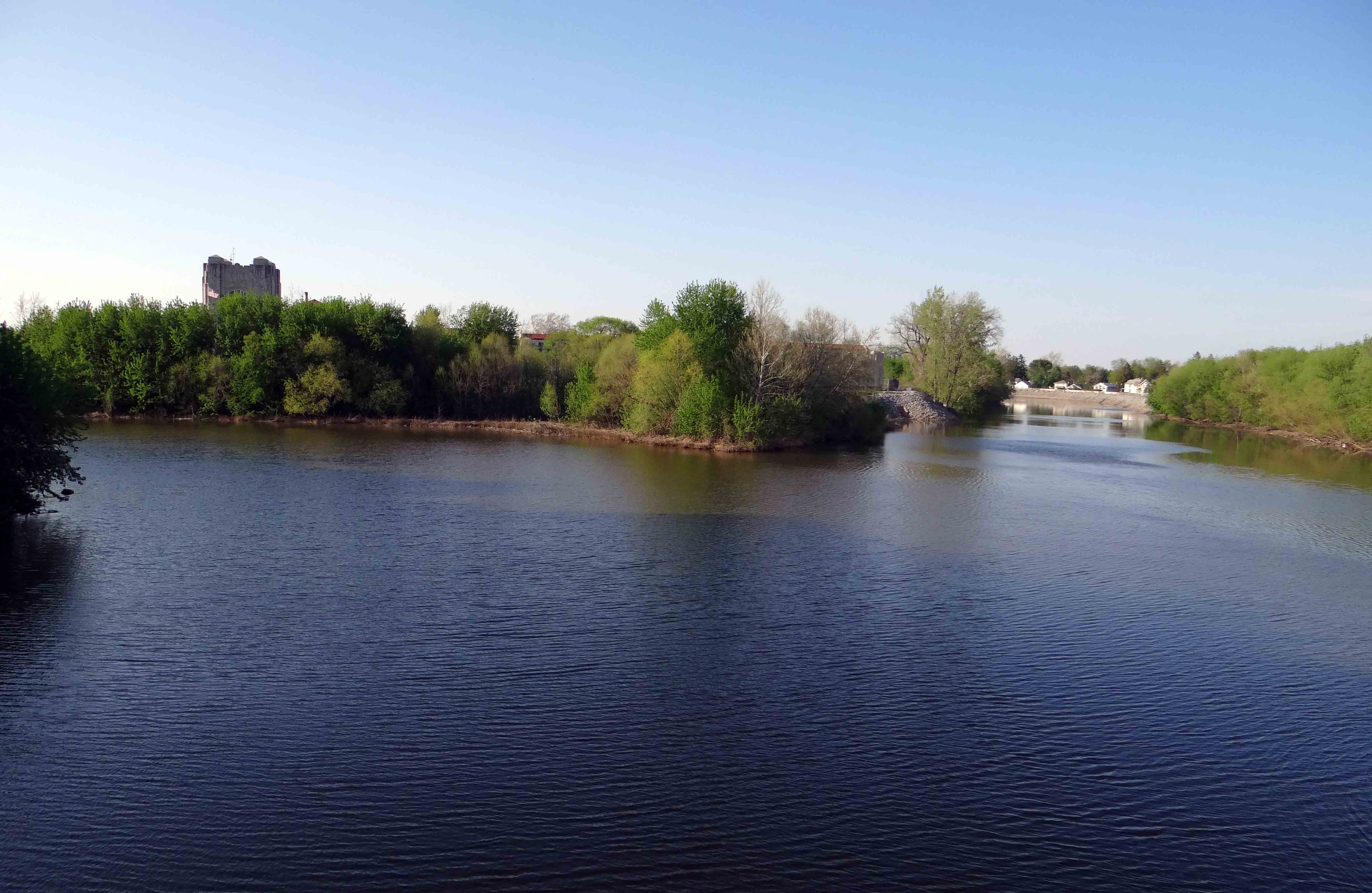
The St. Marys River (left) and St. Joseph River (right) converge to form the Maumee River (foreground).

For a regional summit, the city is situated on flat land characterized by little topographical relief, a result of the Wisconsin glaciation episode. Receding glaciers eroded the land, depositing an evenly distributed layer of sediment during the last glacial period. The most distinguishable topographical feature is Cedar Creek Canyon, just north of the city proper near Huntertown. The Fort Wayne Moraine follows two of the city's three rivers: the St. Marys and St. Joseph. The two rivers converge to form the Maumee, which eventually empties into Lake Erie. Land east of the moraine includes the former Great Black Swamp, a lacustrine plain formed by Glacial Lake Maumee. The Little River flows southwest of Fort Wayne, a tributary of the Wabash River, and remnant of the Maumee Torrent.

Fort Wayne is situated on the Saint Lawrence River Divide, a continental divide separating the Great Lakes Basin from the Gulf of Mexico watershed.

The most important geographical feature of the area is the short distance over land between the Three Rivers system, which eventually flows to the Atlantic, and the Wabash system, which eventually flows to the Gulf of Mexico. This came to be the "portage" or carrying place, over which travelers could transport their cargoes from one system to the next. This natural crossroads attracted the Native Americans for thousands of years. It later attracted the European explorers and traders and the American pioneer settlers who continued to develop the area as a transportation and communications center. Chief Little Turtle of the Miami Nation expressed its importance eloquently at the treaty of Greenville in 1795 when he called it "that glorious gate...through which all the words of our chiefs had to pass through from north to south and from east to west".

Fort Wayne's urban tree canopy is 29 percent, double the state average of 14.5 percent and above the national average of 27.1 percent. The canopy is decreasing, notably from development and the emerald ash borer infestation. Fort Wayne has been designated a Tree City USA since 1990.

=== Cityscape ===
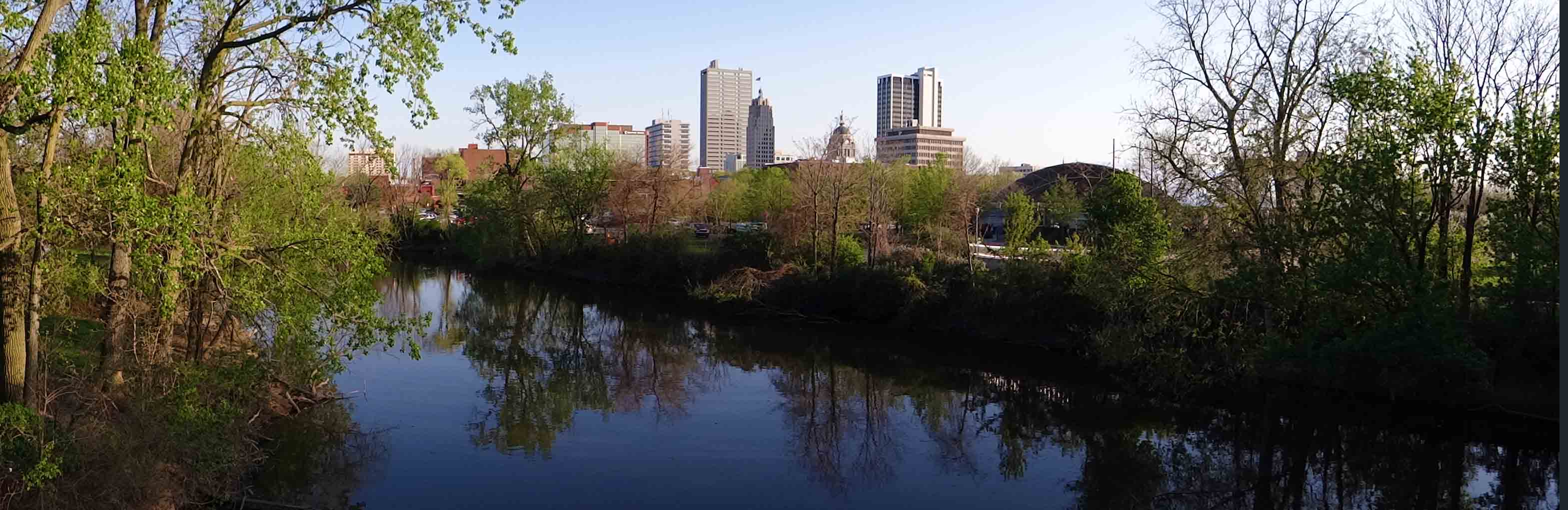
Downtown Fort Wayne, looking south from the St. Marys River

Historically, Fort Wayne has been divided into four unofficial quadrants: northeast, northwest, southeast, and southwest. Calhoun Street divides the southwest and southeast, while the St. Joseph River divides the northwest and northeast quadrants. The Maumee River separates the northeast and southeast, while portions of the St. Marys River and Chicago, Fort Wayne and Eastern Railroad separate the northwest and southwest quadrants.

Fort Wayne's early 20th century development was influenced by the City Beautiful movement and centered on a park and boulevard plan conceived by urban planner Charles Mulford Robinson in 1909 and finalized by landscape architect George Kessler in 1912. The master plan proposed a network of parkways and boulevards connecting the city's three rivers and Spy Run Creek to dozens of neighborhoods and parks. Several parks were designed by noted landscape architect Arthur Asahel Shurcliff. Much of the original plan was implemented by 1955. In 2010, the Fort Wayne Park and Boulevard System was listed on the National Register of Historic Places, consisting of 11 public parks, four parkways, and ten boulevards, covering 1,883 acres (762 ha).

==== Architecture ====
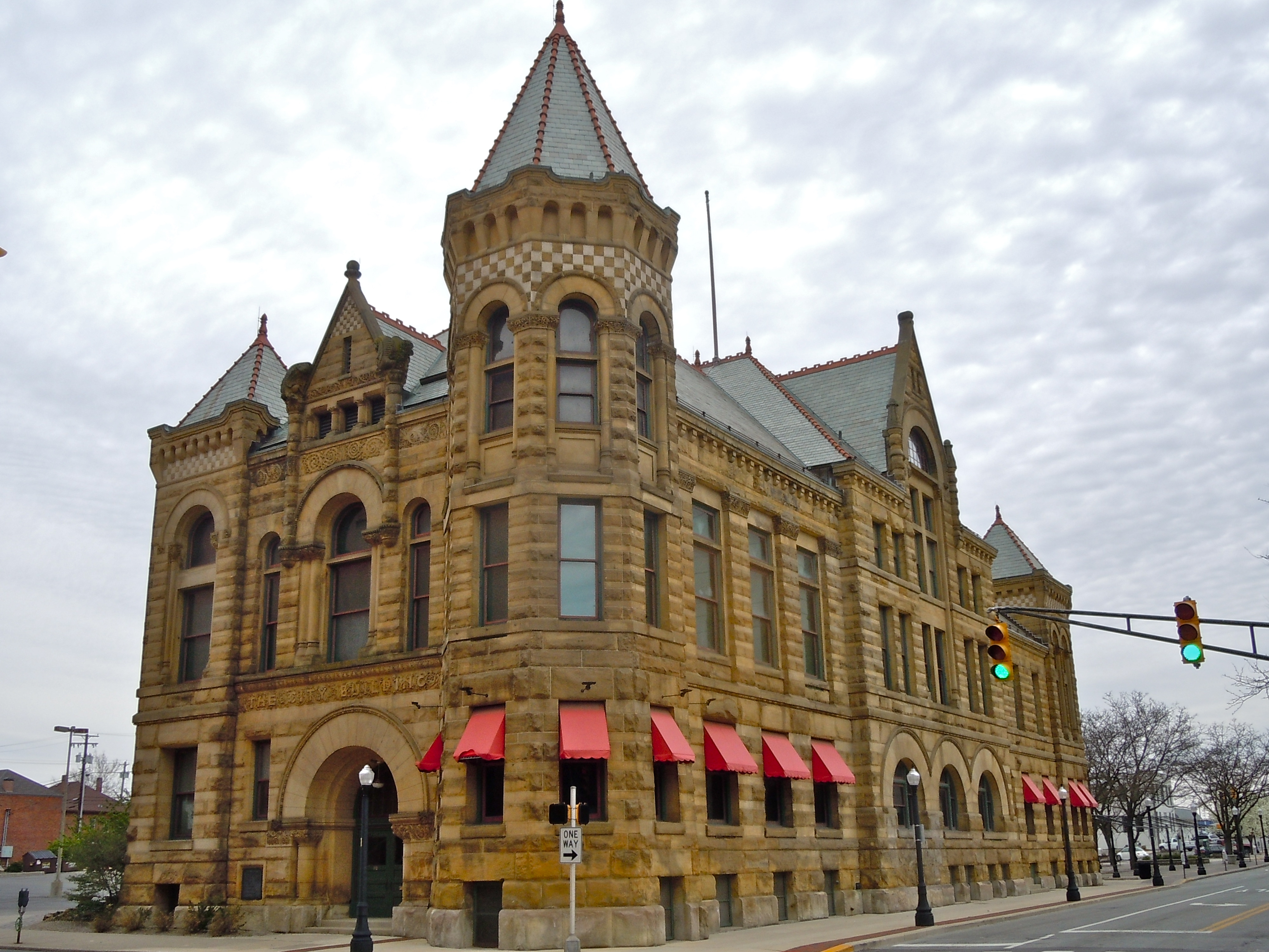
Old City Hall

During the 19th century, Fort Wayne was dominated by Greek Revival, Gothic Revival, and Italianate architecture. Examples of Greek Revival architecture remain in the city, with one being the Richardville House (1827), a National Historic Landmark. Gothic and Gothic Revival architecture can be found in some of the city's most prominent churches, including Trinity English Lutheran Church (1846), Cathedral of the Immaculate Conception (1860), Trinity Episcopal Church (1865), and Saint Paul's Evangelical Lutheran Church (1889).

Popular early 20th century architectural styles found in the city include Queen Anne, Richardsonian Romanesque, Neoclassical, Colonial Revival, Dutch Colonial Revival, Tudor Revival, Prairie, American Craftsman, American Foursquare, and Art Deco. Richardsonian Romanesque buildings include Fort Wayne City Hall (1893) and John H. Bass Mansion (1902), each designed by Wing & Mahurin. Notable examples of Neoclassical architecture include the Masonic Temple (1926) and North Side High School (1927). Beaux-Arts, an architectural style closely related to Neoclassical, gained popularity during the City Beautiful movement of the 1890s and early 1900s, which is reflected in the Allen County Courthouse (1902).

The Pennsylvania Railroad Station, also known as Baker Street Station (1914), was designed in American Craftsman style. At 312 feet (95 m), the Art Deco-style Lincoln Bank Tower was Fort Wayne's first high-rise and Indiana's tallest building from 1930 to 1962. The E. Ross Adair Federal Building and United States Courthouse (1932) is another example of Art Deco architecture. Williams–Woodland Park Historic District includes examples of Queen Anne and Colonial Revival residential homes, while the Forest Park Boulevard Historic District includes Tudor Revival homes.

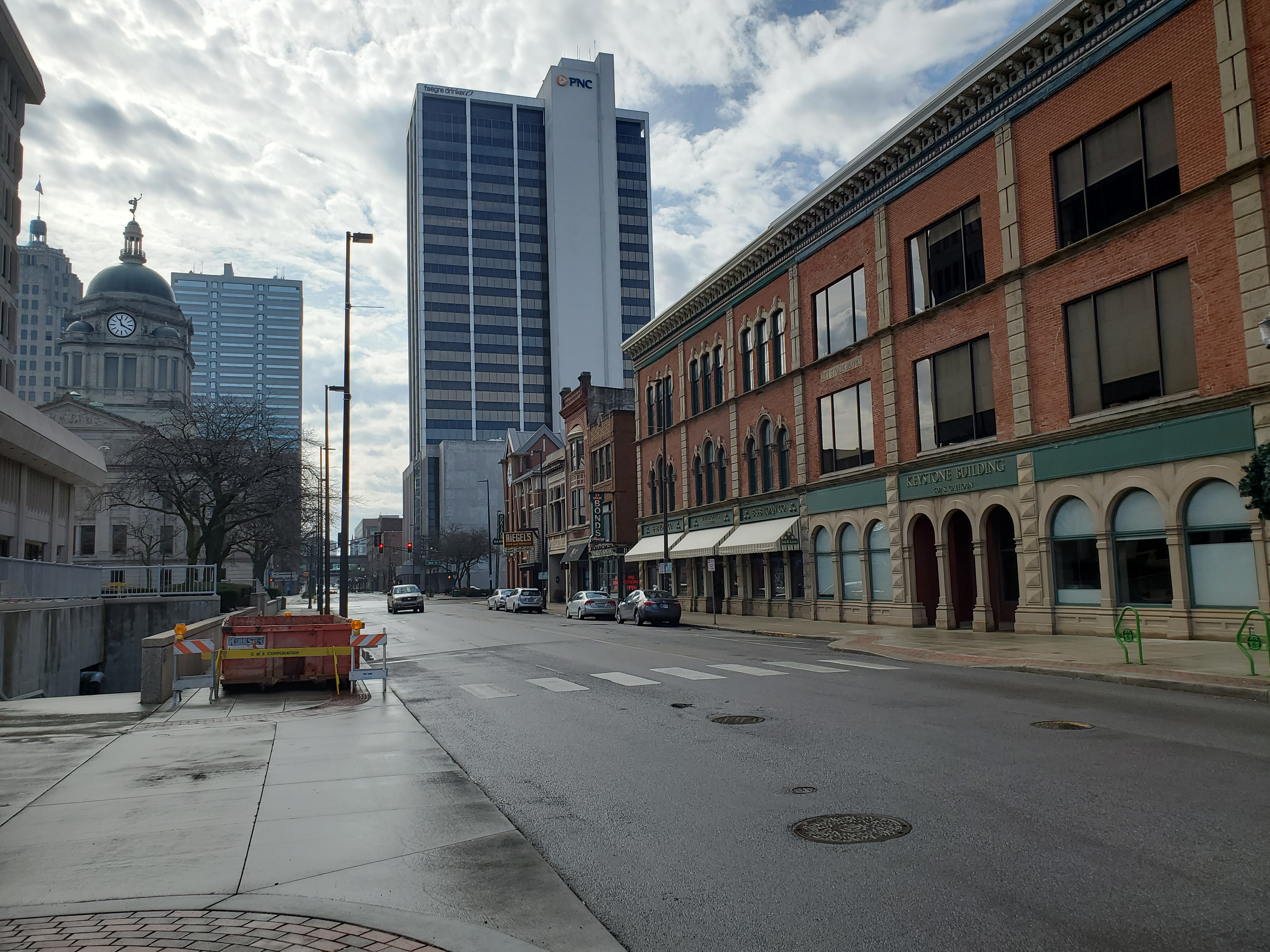
Calhoun Street facing south in downtown Fort Wayne

Modern and Postmodern architecture can be found in buildings constructed during the second half of the 20th century in Fort Wayne. The John D. Haynes House (1952) was designed by Frank Lloyd Wright, while the campus of Concordia Theological Seminary (1953) was designed by Eero Saarinen. Postmodern architect Michael Graves' first commissions were built in the city, including Hanselmann House (1967) and Snyderman House (1972, now demolished). Louis Kahn's design for the Arts United Center (1973) was inspired by a violin and its case. Other notable buildings include Indiana Michigan Power Center (1982), the tallest building in the city and tallest building in Indiana outside of Indianapolis, at 442 feet (135 m).

The 1970s characterized an era in Fort Wayne that saw substantial changes to the downtown area in accommodation of increasing suburbanization and urban sprawl that began in the city during the early 1950s, of which resulted in the demolition of several prominent and historical buildings and homes around the downtown area. This included several hotels, such as the historic thirteen-floor Hotel Anthony. Most of which, were demolished for surface-level parking lots. One example was the Ewing Homestead, built by William Ewing in 1838, it once stood at the northwest corner of Berry Street:

This three-story brick mansion was one of the finest examples of Greek Revival architecture in Fort Wayne until it was destroyed in 1970 to make way for a parking lot.

=== Rivers ===
Since at least the early 20th century, Fort Wayne has maintained a combined sewage overflow program, which has resulted in the city routinely discharging untreated human waste, raw sewage from businesses and homes, toxic waste from industrial sites, and agricultural runoff into all three rivers in a number of locations, particularly during heavy rainfall events. However, as of 2023, a several million dollar citywide sewage overflow tunnel project is set to be completed, among additional efforts, such as a $135 million investment from the city into rain gardens, to prevent further discharge into the rivers. There has been growing investment and development along the riverfront since at least 2019.

=== Climate ===
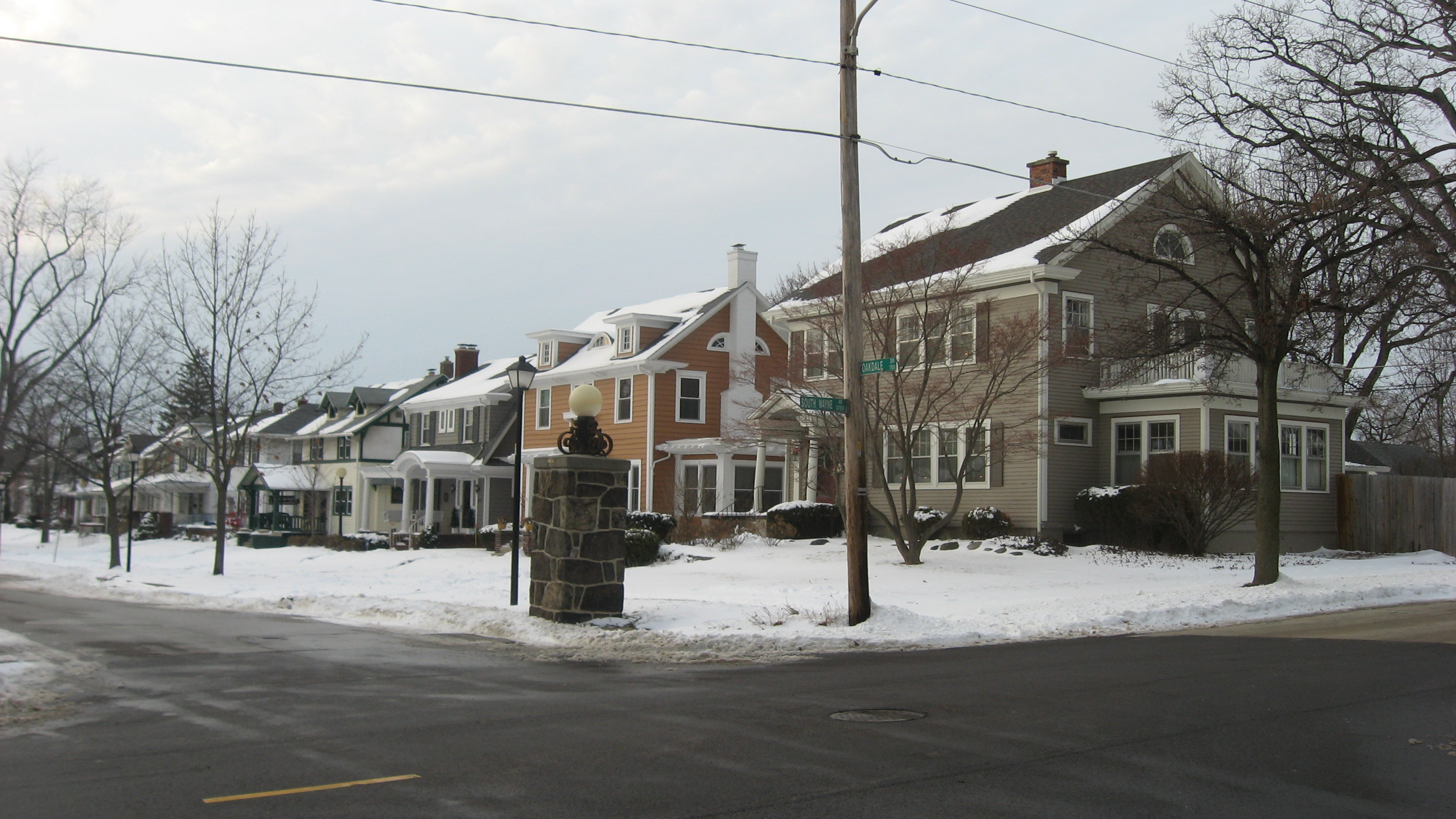
The Oakdale neighborhood after a January snow

Fort Wayne lies in the humid continental climate zone (Köppen: Dfa), experiencing four distinct seasons. The city is located in USDA hardiness zones 5b and 6a. Typically, summers are hot, humid, and wet. Winters are generally cold with moderate snowfall. The average annual precipitation is 38.34 in (974 mm), recorded at Fort Wayne International Airport. During the winter season, snowfall accumulation averages 33.5 in (85 cm) per year. Lake-effect snow is not uncommon to the region, but usually appears in the form of light snow flurries.

The National Weather Service reports the highest recorded temperature in the city at 106 °F (41 °C), most recently on June 28, 2012, and the lowest recorded temperature at −24 °F (−31 °C) on January 12, 1918. The wettest month on record was June 2015, with 11.98 in (304 mm) of precipitation. The greatest 24-hour rainfall was 4.93 in (125 mm) on August 1, 1926. The snowiest month on record was January 2014, with 30.3 in (77 cm) of snowfall. The greatest calendar-day snowfall was 18.0 in (46 cm) on February 28, 1900.

=== Severe weather ===
Severe weather is not uncommon in Fort Wayne, particularly in the spring and summer months; the city experiences an average of 39 thunderstorm days and about 10 severe weather days annually.

The city has endured several tornadoes throughout its history. On July 19, 1950, a weak tornado formed on the city's west central side and moved northeast, striking the downtown area. On May 26, 2001, an EF1 tornado struck a shopping center on the city's northeast side, flipping cars and damaging roofs and windows on nearby residences and businesses. Three people were injured in the storm.

The city experienced 91 mph (146 km/h) wind gusts in the June 2012 North American derecho, knocking out power to 78,000, uprooting approximately 500 trees, and costing $2.5 million.

Climate data for Fort Wayne, Indiana (Fort Wayne Int'l), 1991–2020 normals, (Note: Mean monthly maxima and minima (i.e. the highest and lowest temperature readings during an entire month or year) calculated based on data at said location from 1991 to 2020.) extremes 1897–present
Month	Jan	Feb	Mar	Apr	May	Jun	Jul	Aug	Sep	Oct	Nov	Dec	Year
Record high °F (°C)	69 (21)	73 (23)	87 (31)	90 (32)	97 (36)	106 (41)	106 (41)	102 (39)	100 (38)	91 (33)	79 (26)	71 (22)	106 (41)
Mean maximum °F (°C)	54.9 (12.7)	58.2 (14.6)	70.9 (21.6)	80.4 (26.9)	88.2 (31.2)	93.5 (34.2)	93.0 (33.9)	91.3 (32.9)	89.5 (31.9)	82.6 (28.1)	68.1 (20.1)	57.8 (14.3)	95.1 (35.1)
Mean daily maximum °F (°C)	32.6 (0.3)	36.5 (2.5)	47.8 (8.8)	60.9 (16.1)	72.2 (22.3)	81.0 (27.2)	84.1 (28.9)	82.0 (27.8)	76.1 (24.5)	63.7 (17.6)	49.4 (9.7)	37.5 (3.1)	60.3 (15.7)
Daily mean °F (°C)	25.5 (−3.6)	28.7 (−1.8)	38.6 (3.7)	50.2 (10.1)	61.3 (16.3)	70.7 (21.5)	73.8 (23.2)	71.6 (22.0)	64.8 (18.2)	53.2 (11.8)	41.1 (5.1)	30.9 (−0.6)	50.9 (10.5)
Mean daily minimum °F (°C)	18.4 (−7.6)	21.0 (−6.1)	29.4 (−1.4)	39.4 (4.1)	50.4 (10.2)	60.3 (15.7)	63.5 (17.5)	61.2 (16.2)	53.4 (11.9)	42.8 (6.0)	32.8 (0.4)	24.2 (−4.3)	41.4 (5.2)
Mean minimum °F (°C)	−4.1 (−20.1)	1.0 (−17.2)	11.4 (−11.4)	24.0 (−4.4)	35.1 (1.7)	46.6 (8.1)	52.4 (11.3)	49.9 (9.9)	39.3 (4.1)	28.5 (−1.9)	18.1 (−7.7)	4.9 (−15.1)	−7.1 (−21.7)
Record low °F (°C)	−24 (−31)	−19 (−28)	−9.9 (−23.3)	7 (−14)	23 (−5)	36 (2)	38 (3)	38 (3)	29 (−2)	19 (−7)	−1 (−18)	−18 (−28)	−24 (−31)
Average precipitation inches (mm)	2.54 (65)	2.06 (52)	2.81 (71)	3.74 (95)	4.58 (116)	4.48 (114)	4.05 (103)	3.80 (97)	3.04 (77)	2.95 (75)	2.96 (75)	2.47 (63)	39.48 (1,003)
Average snowfall inches (cm)	10.8 (27)	7.8 (20)	4.6 (12)	0.8 (2.0)	0.0 (0.0)	0.0 (0.0)	0.0 (0.0)	0.0 (0.0)	0.0 (0.0)	0.1 (0.25)	1.9 (4.8)	7.6 (19)	33.6 (85)
Average extreme snow depth inches (cm)	5.3 (13)	4.2 (11)	2.7 (6.9)	0.4 (1.0)	0.0 (0.0)	0.0 (0.0)	0.0 (0.0)	0.0 (0.0)	0.0 (0.0)	0.0 (0.0)	0.9 (2.3)	3.3 (8.4)	6.9 (18)
Average precipitation days (≥ 0.01 in)	13.2	10.7	11.7	13.2	13.7	11.9	9.7	9.2	9.1	10.1	10.5	12.4	135.4
Average snowy days (≥ 0.1 in)	10.1	7.5	4.5	1.2	0.0	0.0	0.0	0.0	0.0	0.2	2.8	7.7	34.0
Average relative humidity (%)	75.7	74.3	71.7	66.2	65.5	66.3	69.4	73.3	73.2	71.5	76.0	78.9	71.8
Mean monthly sunshine hours	148.5	158.5	206.3	251.4	311.9	340.0	347.0	318.2	258.1	207.6	124.2	108.2	2,779.9
Percentage possible sunshine	50	53	56	63	69	75	76	75	69	60	42	38	62
Source: NOAA (relative humidity and sun 1961–1990)

== Demographics ==
Historical population
Census	Pop.	Note	%±
1850	4,282		—
1860	7,000	(Note: The commonly-cited figure of 10,388 was the count for Wayne Township rather than the city of Fort Wayne, which did not have a separate population figure reported in 1860.)	63.5%
1870	17,718		153.1%
1880	26,880		51.7%
1890	35,393		31.7%
1900	45,115		27.5%
1910	63,933		41.7%
1920	86,549		35.4%
1930	114,946		32.8%
1940	118,410		3.0%
1950	133,607		12.8%
1960	161,776		21.1%
1970	178,269		10.2%
1980	172,196		−3.4%
1990	173,072		0.5%
2000	205,727		18.9%
2010	253,691		23.3%
2020	263,886		4.0%
2025 (est.)	275,203	▲	4.3%
U.S. Decennial Census 2010-2020

Fort Wayne is the principal city of the Fort Wayne metropolitan area, consisting of Allen and Whitley counties in Indiana. It had an estimated population of 423,038 as of 2021. In addition to the two core counties, the greater Fort Wayne combined statistical area includes Adams, DeKalb, Huntington, Noble, Steuben, and Wells counties, with an estimated population of 649,105 in 2021.

=== 2020 census ===
Fort Wayne city, Indiana – Racial and ethnic composition Note: the US Census treats Hispanic/Latino as an ethnic category. This table excludes Latinos from the racial categories and assigns them to a separate category. Hispanics/Latinos may be of any race.
Race / Ethnicity (NH = Non-Hispanic)	Pop 2000	Pop 2010	Pop 2020	% 2000	% 2010	% 2020	Change 2010–2020
White alone (NH)	150,368	178,436	165,865	73.09%	70.34%	62.85%	-7.49%
Black or African American alone (NH)	35,391	38,514	39,560	17.20%	15.18%	14.99%	-.19%
Native American or Alaska Native alone (NH)	653	730	627	0.32%	0.29%	0.24%	-.05%
Asian alone (NH)	3,156	8,279	15,229	1.53%	3.26%	5.77%	+2.51%
Pacific Islander alone (NH)	73	91	108	0.04%	0.04%	0.04%	-
Some Other Race alone (NH)	470	542	1,517	0.23%	0.21%	0.57%	+.36%
Mixed Race or Multi-Racial (NH)	3,732	6,899	13,084	1.81%	2.72%	4.96%	+2.24%
Hispanic or Latino (any race)	11,884	20,200	27,896	5.78%	7.96%	10.57%	+2.61%
Total	205,727	253,691	263,886	100.00%	100.00%	100.00%	-

=== 2010 census ===
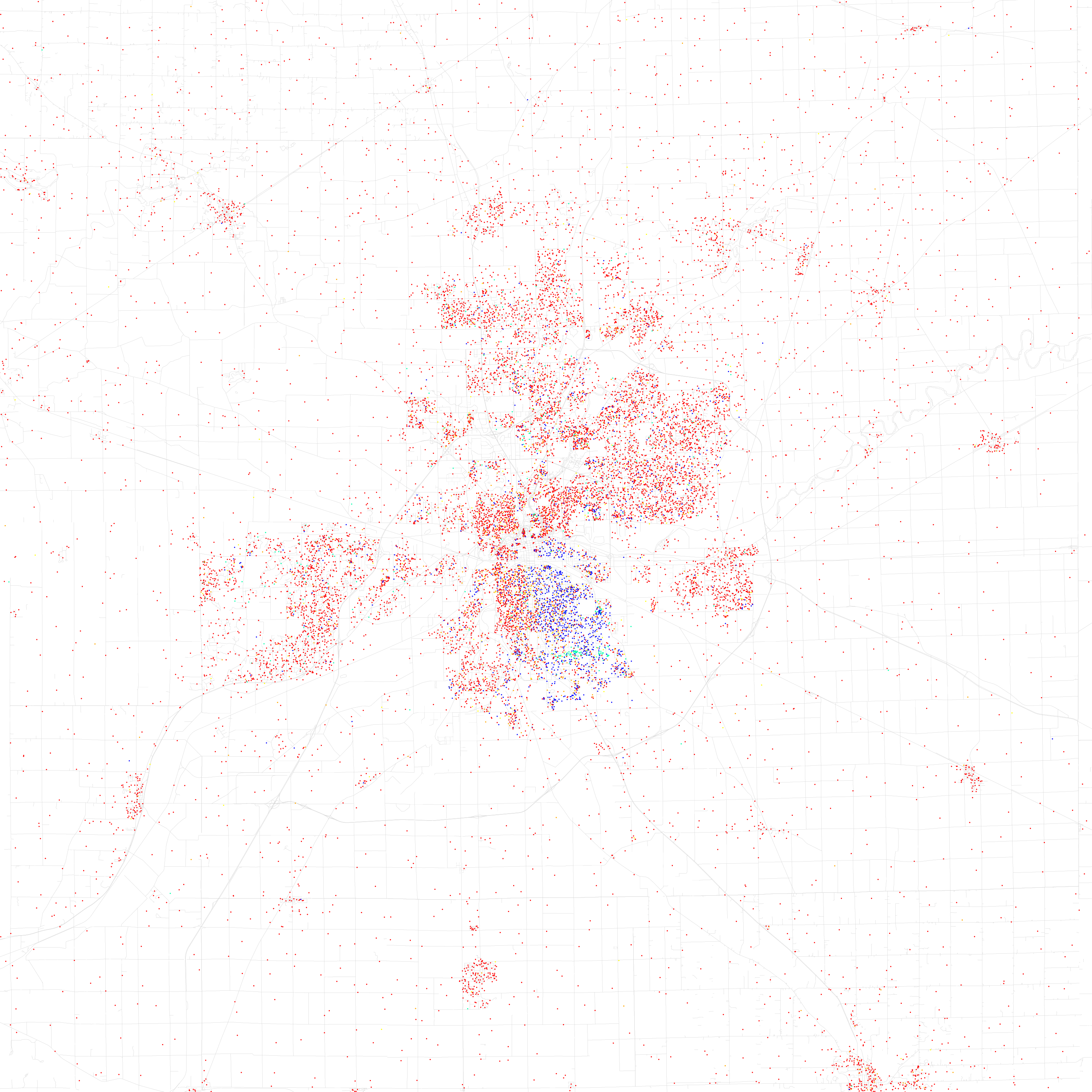
Map of racial distribution in Fort Wayne, 2010 U.S. Census. Each dot is 25 people: ⬤ White ⬤ Black ⬤ Asian ⬤ Hispanic ⬤ Other

According to the 2010 census, there were 253,691 people and 113,541 households. The racial makeup of the city is 73.62% White, 15.41% Black or African American, 0.37% Native American or Alaska Native, 3.3% Asian (1.4% Burmese, 0.4% Indian, 0.3% Vietnamese, 0.2% Chinese, 0.2% Filipino, 0.1% Korean, 0.1% Laotian, 0.1% Thai), 0.06% Pacific Islander, 3.72% from other races, and 3.52% from two or more races. 7.96% of the population are Hispanic or Latino of any race. Among the Hispanic population, 6.1% are Mexican, 0.4% Puerto Rican, and 0.3% Guatemalan. Non-Hispanic Whites were 70.3% of the population in 2010, down from 87.7% in 1970.

There were 101,585 households, of which 30.1% had children under the age of 18 living with them, 42.3% were married couples living together, 14.8% had a female householder with no husband present, 4.9% had a male householder with no wife present, and 38.0% were non-families. 31.2% of all households were made up of individuals, and 9.7% had someone living alone who was 65 years of age or older. The average household size was 2.44 and the average family size was 3.09.

The median age in the city was 34.5 years. 26.4% of residents were under the age of 18; 10.2% were between the ages of 18 and 24; 26.5% were from 25 to 44; 24.9% were from 45 to 64; and 12% were 65 years of age or older. The gender makeup of the city was 48.4% male and 51.6% female.

Fort Wayne has one of the largest Burmese American population in the U.S., estimated at 8,000. Burmese refugee settlement and "secondary migrants" doubled the city's Asian population between 2000 and 2010.

=== Religion ===
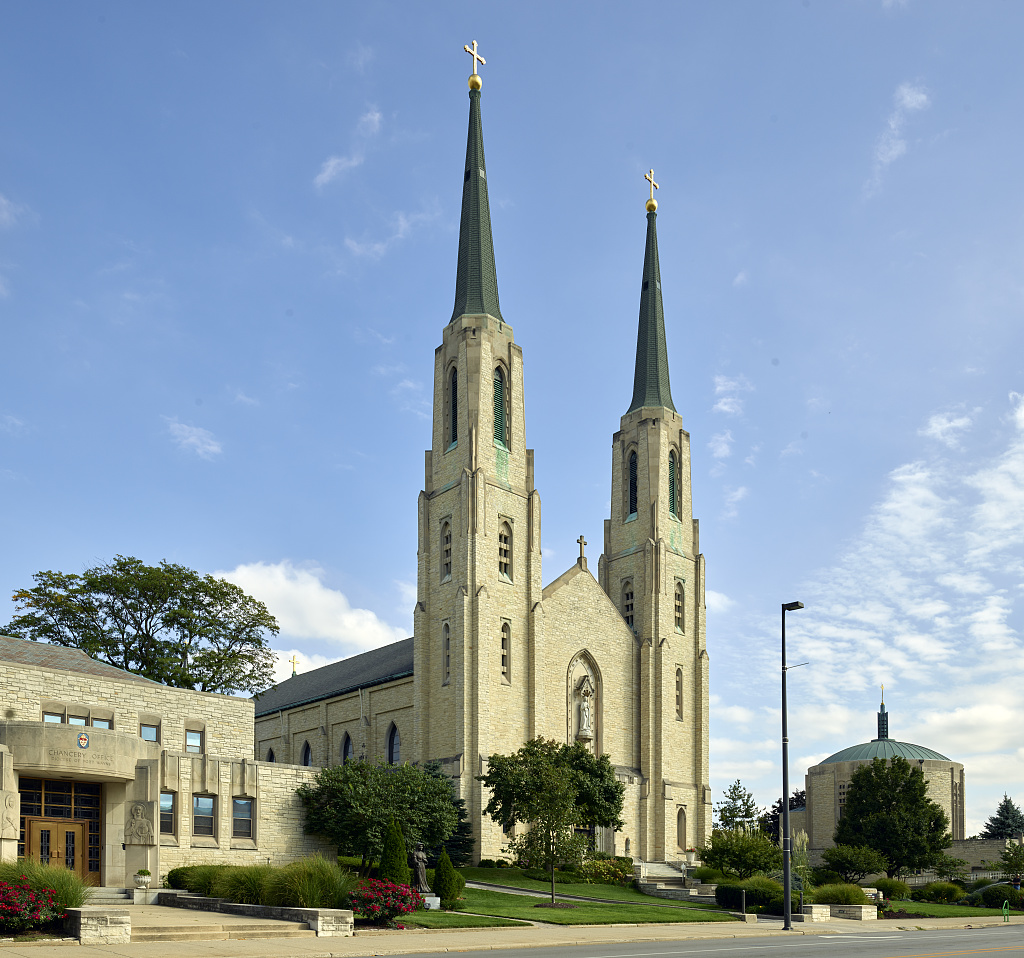
Cathedral of the Immaculate Conception, co-cathedral of the Roman Catholic Diocese of Fort Wayne-South Bend

Fort Wayne is sometimes referred to as the "City of Churches", an unofficial moniker dating to the late-19th century when the city was the regional hub of Catholic, Lutheran, and Episcopal faiths. Today, there are 360 churches in the city. 54 percent of Fort Wayne residents identify as religious, where 16 percent are Catholic, 9 percent are Lutheran, 6.5 percent are Baptist, 5 percent are Methodist, and 16.5 percent adhere to other Christian faiths. 0.54 percent of residents are Jewish. Increasing religious minorities are found among the city's immigrant communities, including Buddhism, Hinduism, and Islam.

Major churches include the Cathedral of the Immaculate Conception, Saint Paul's Evangelical Lutheran Church and Trinity Episcopal Church. Fort Wayne's Reform Judaism population is served by Congregation Achduth Vesholom, the oldest Jewish congregation in Indiana, founded in 1848. In 2013, construction began on the first Burmese Muslim mosque to be built worldwide since the mid-1970s.

As of December 2012, four national Christian denominations were headquartered in the city: the American Association of Lutheran Churches, the Fundamental Baptist Fellowship Association, the Missionary Church and the Fellowship of Evangelical Churches. Fort Wayne is the seat of the Roman Catholic Diocese of Fort Wayne–South Bend, covering 14 counties in Northern Indiana, and the Indiana District of the Lutheran Church–Missouri Synod, encompassing all of Indiana and north central Kentucky.

== Economy ==
In 2017, the Fort Wayne metropolitan area had a gross domestic product (GDP) of $25.7 billion. The top four industries were manufacturing ($8.1B), health care ($2.54B), retail trade ($1.4B), and finance and insurance ($1.3B). Government, if it had been a private industry, would have tied for third, generating $1.4 billion.

Manufacturing is deeply rooted in Fort Wayne's economic history, dating to the earliest days of the city's growth as an important trade stop along the Wabash and Erie Canal. Railroads, introduced shortly after the canal's arrival, eased travel from Fort Wayne to other booming industrial centers along the Great Lakes, such as Chicago, Detroit, Toledo, and Cleveland. Throughout the early and mid-20th century, manufacturing dominated the city's economic landscape. From 1900 to 1930, Fort Wayne's industrial output expanded by 747 percent, with total production valued at $95 million in 1929, up from $11 million in 1899. The total workforce also increased from 18,000 in 1900 to nearly 50,000 in 1930.

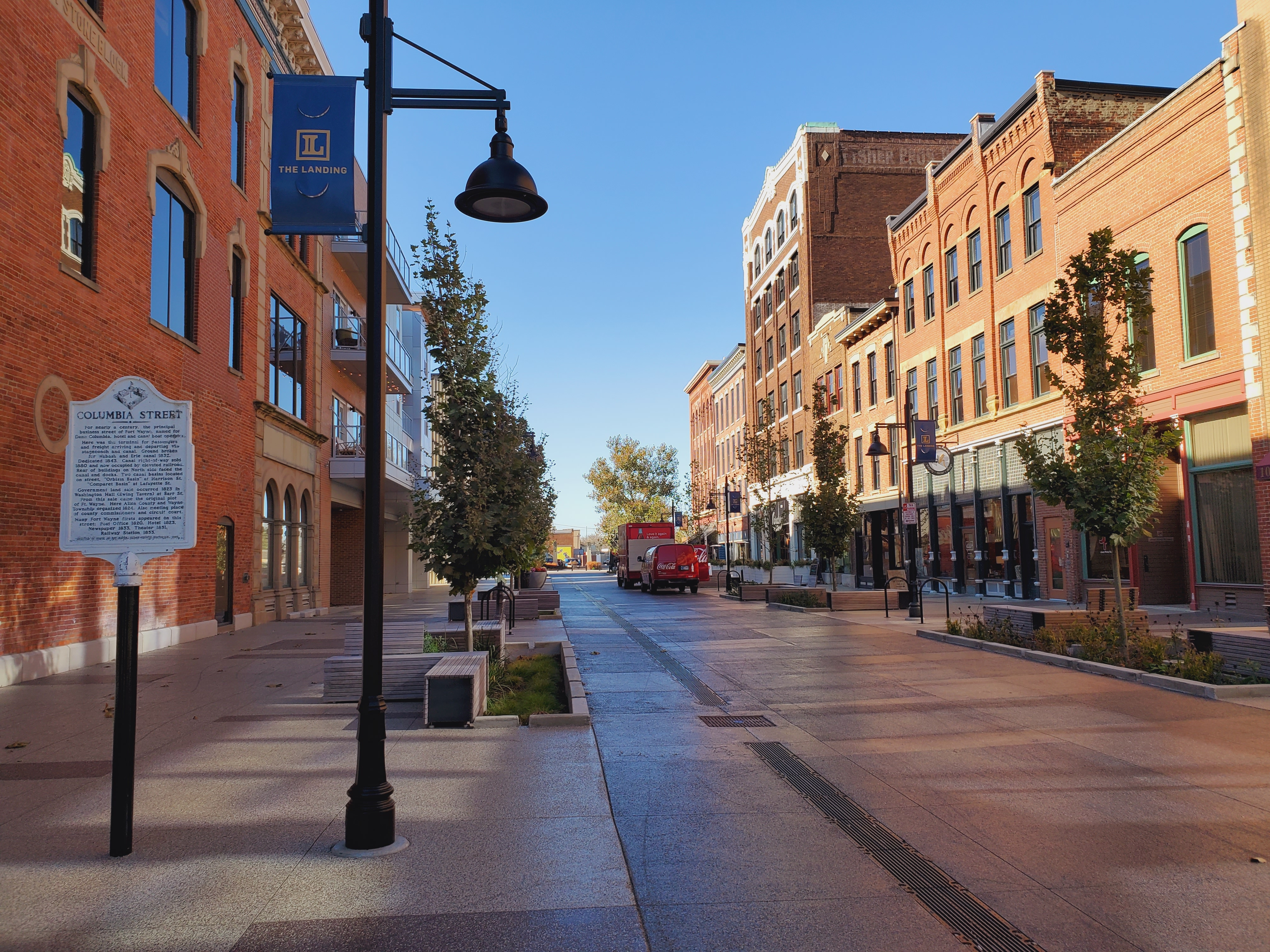
The Landing is a cluster of historic buildings in downtown Fort Wayne that the city began repurposing into commercial and residential real estate in 2017.

Companies that had a significant presence in the city include Dana Holding Corporation, Falstaff Brewing Corporation, Fruehauf Corporation, General Electric, International Harvester, Magnavox, Old Crown Brewing Corporation, and Tokheim, among several others, producing goods such as refrigerators, washing machines, automatic phonographs, meat packing products, televisions, garbage disposals, automotive parts and motors, trailers, gasoline pumps, trucks, beer, tents and awnings. Magnet wire was an especially important export for the city. In 1960, Fort Wayne companies supplied nearly 90 percent of North America's magnet wire market.

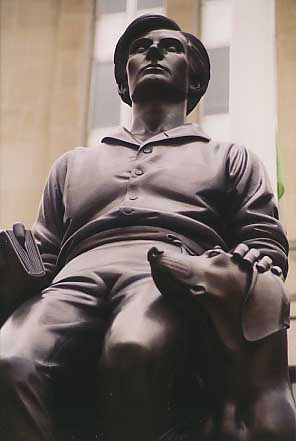
Abraham Lincoln: The Hoosier Youth stands in front of Lincoln Financial Group's downtown offices.

The 1970s and 1980s were times of economic depression in Fort Wayne, when much of the city's manufacturing foundation eroded and the blue-collar workforce shrank. Fort Wayne joined several other cities reeling economically within the Rust Belt. At the same time, General Electric also downsized much of its more than 10,000-person workforce. Amid other area plant closures and downsizing, coupled with the early 1980s recession, the city lost 30,000 jobs and reached a 12.1 percent unemployment rate. The arrival of General Motors in 1987 helped fill the void from shuttered manufacturers and aided in the area's recovery, employing 3,000 at its Fort Wayne Assembly. In 2024, General Motors was the largest manufacturer in the city, employing 4,320. The plant assembles GMC Sierra and Chevrolet Silverado regular and double cab light- and heavy-duty pickup trucks.

Through the 1990s and into the 2000s, the city diversified its economy; manufacturing now employs 16.9 percent of Allen County's workforce. Other sectors include distribution, transportation, and logistics (23.1 percent), health care (17.9 percent), professional and business services (12.1 percent), leisure and hospitality (11.1 percent), and financial services (6.3 percent). The leisure and hospitality sector has especially grown, with 5.8 million visitors spending $545 million in 2013, a 4.3 percent increase over the previous year. The city is a center for the defense industry, employing thousands at such companies as BAE Systems (1,150), L3Harris (888), Raytheon Technologies (950), and the Fort Wayne Air National Guard Base (423).

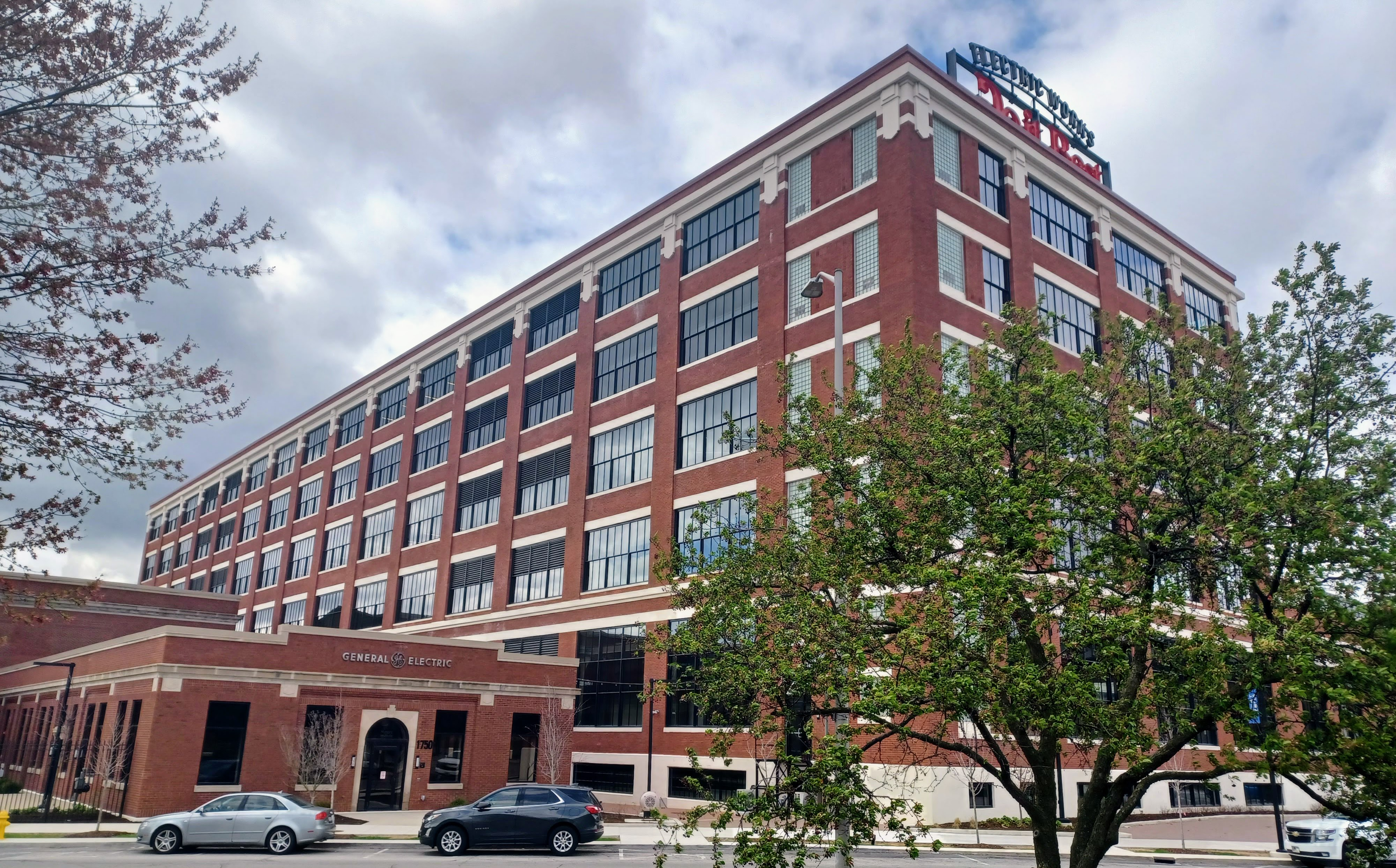
Do it Best corporate headquarters at Electric Works. In 2022, Do it Best was the largest privately held company in the state of Indiana, with US$5.5 billion in revenue.

Despite economic diversification, the city was significantly impacted by the Great Recession. According to a report from Pew Research Center, the city lost nearly a quarter of its manufacturing jobs and 11% of its economic status between 2000 and 2014. Economic Innovation Group's 2016 Distressed Communities Index Report ranked Fort Wayne among the most unequal large cities in the U.S. in terms of linking economic opportunities to its distressed ZIP codes. As of 2025, Allen County's labor force was 204,024 with an unemployment rate of 3.4 percent.

In January 2024, the City of Fort Wayne announced plans with Google to construct a data center. Construction started in April 2024. The first-phase of the project was completed in December 2025, making the Fort Wayne Google data center operational with ongoing construction.

Companies based in Fort Wayne include Brotherhood Mutual, Do it Best, Franklin Electric, Genteq, Global Van Lines, Home Reserve, Indiana Michigan Power, K&K Insurance, MedPro Group, North American Van Lines, Rea Magnet Wire, Steel Dynamics, Sweetwater Sound, and Vera Bradley. Steel Dynamics is the only Fortune 500 company headquartered in the city. Other prominent non-government employers include Parkview Health, Amazon, Lutheran Health Network, Lincoln Financial Group, and BFGoodrich.

== Culture ==
=== Performing arts ===
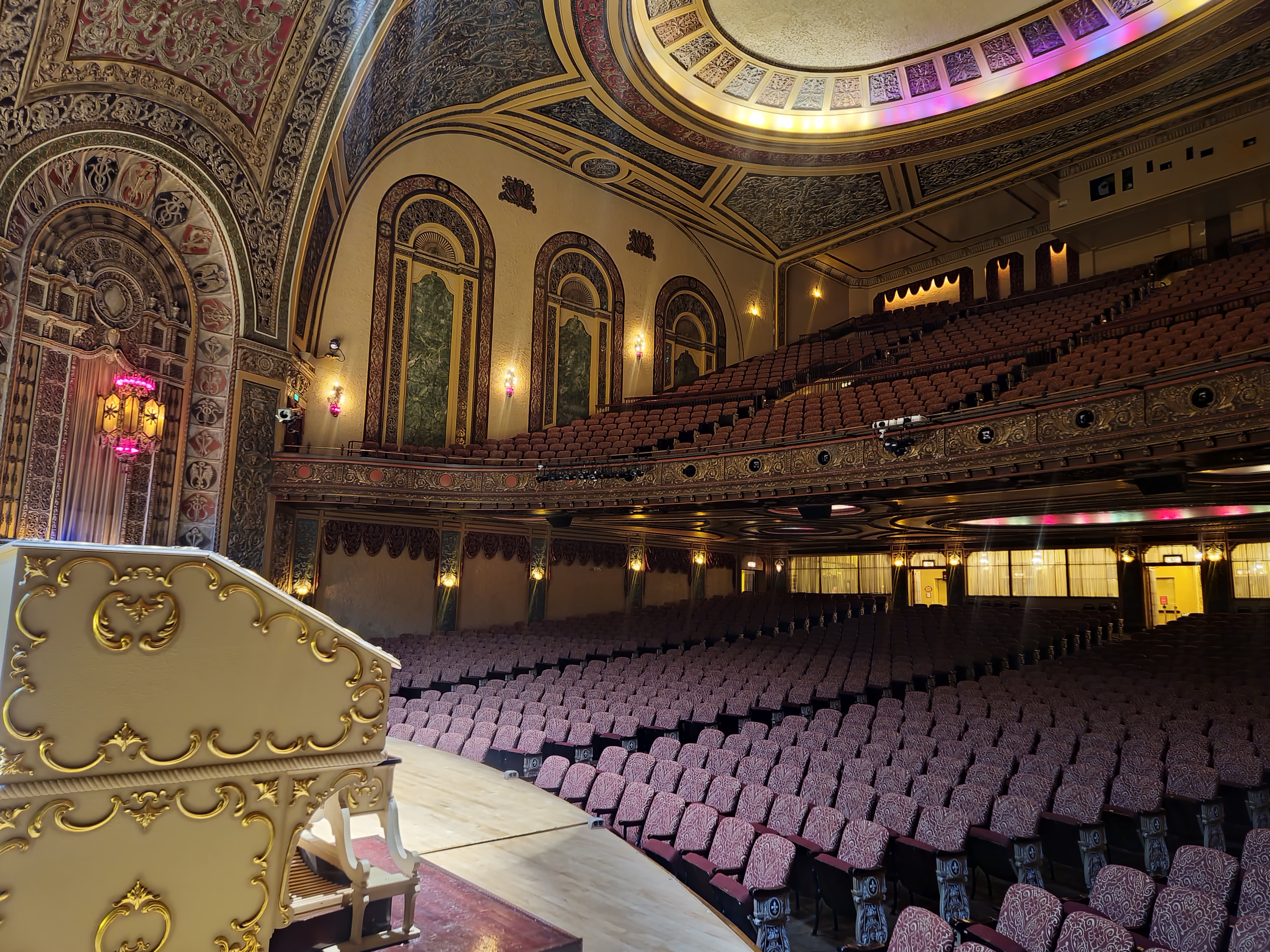
The Embassy Theatre opened in 1928 as a movie palace.

The Embassy Theatre is a 2,471-seat performing arts theater, which hosts over 200,000 patrons annually. Since its founding in 1944, the Fort Wayne Philharmonic Orchestra has often been hosted at the Embassy. The University of Saint Francis Robert Goldstine Performing Arts Center, located on its Downtown Campus, contains a 2,086-seat auditorium.

Since its establishment in 2010, Arts Campus Fort Wayne has been home to several of the city's cultural institutions, including the Fort Wayne Museum of Art, Auer Center for Arts and Culture, Arts United Center, and Hall Community Arts Center. Arts United Center houses the Fort Wayne Civic Theater, Fort Wayne Dance Collective, and Fort Wayne Youtheatre. Auer Center for Arts and Culture houses Fort Wayne Ballet. Hall Community Arts Center houses Cinema Center, an independent film venue.

Though used mainly for exhibitions and conventions, the Grand Wayne Convention Center hosts dance and choir productions, such as the annual Foundation for Art and Music in Education (FAME) Northeast Festival. Foellinger Theatre, a 2,500-seat amphitheater in Franke Park, hosts seasonal acts and outdoor concerts during warmer months. Located west of downtown, Arena Dinner Theatre is a nonprofit community arts corporation with a focus on live theater production, annually hosting seven full-length theatrical productions.

=== Attractions ===
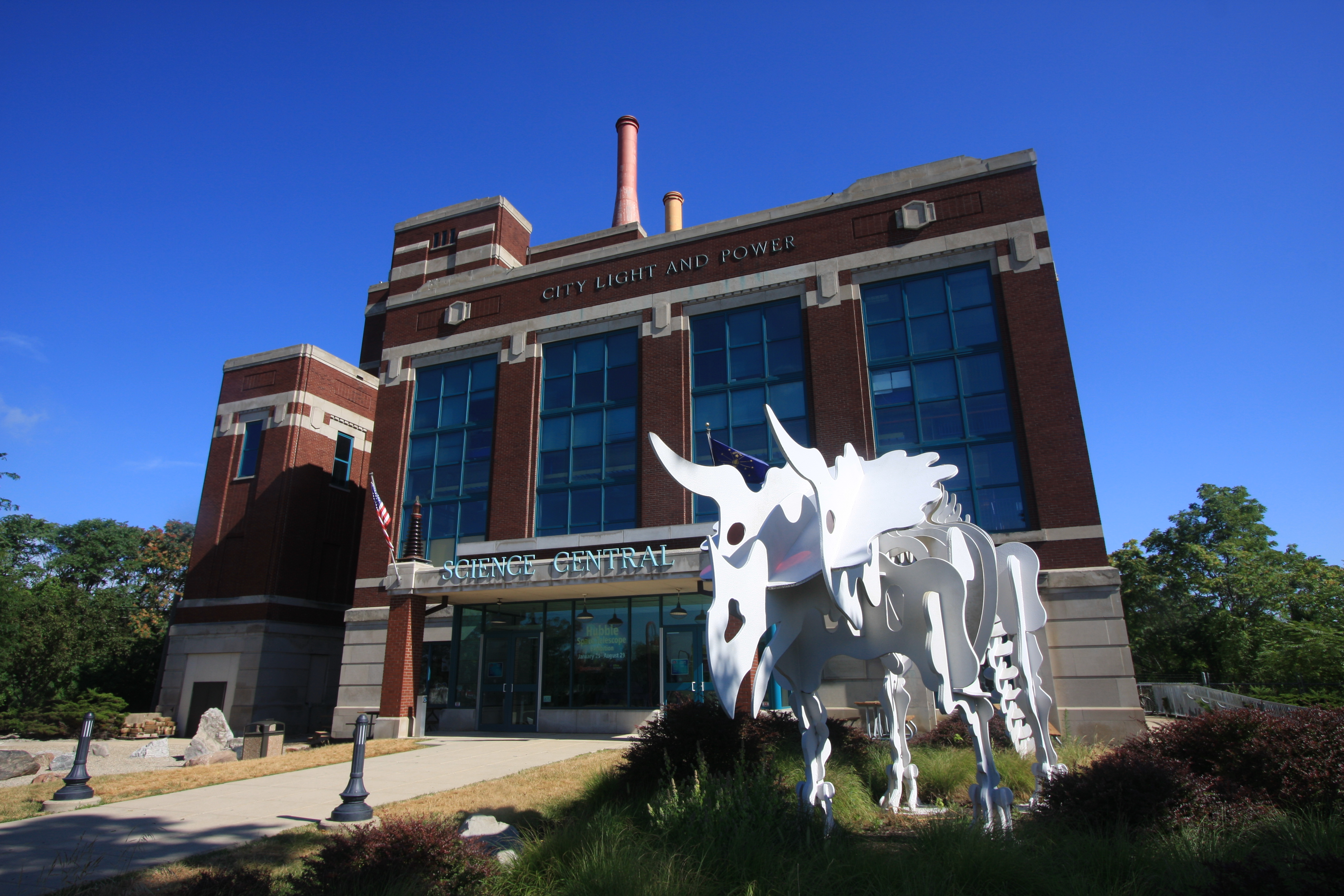
Science Central opened in the city's former municipal power plant in 1995.

The Fort Wayne Zoo has been lauded as one of the nation's foremost zoos. Covering 40 acres (16 ha) and containing 1,000 animals of 200 different species, the zoo is the largest regional attraction, regularly drawing over 500,000 visitors annually. The Foellinger-Freimann Botanical Conservatory gardens cover 24,500-square-foot (2,280 m^{2}), displaying over 1,200 plants of 502 different species and 72 types of cacti. Science Central, an interactive science center, contains permanent displays and temporary exhibits, drawing 130,000 visitors annually.

Established in 1921, the Fort Wayne Museum of Art (FWMoA) is accredited by the American Alliance of Museums, specializing in the collection and exhibition of American art. The FWMoA annually receives 100,000 visitors.

The History Center, located in Fort Wayne's Old City Hall, manages a collection of more than 23,000 artifacts recalling the region's history. The center is overseen by the Allen County–Fort Wayne Historical Society, which maintains the Richardville House, one of two National Historic Landmarks in the city. Historic Fort Wayne, a replica of the 1815 fortification, hosts scheduled tours and historical reenactments throughout the year. Other cultural museums include the African/African–American Historical Museum, the Veterans National Memorial Shrine and Museum, Fort Wayne Firefighters Museum, Greater Fort Wayne Aviation Museum, and Baer Field Heritage Air Park.

The Allen County Public Library's Fred J. Reynolds Historical Genealogy Department is the second-largest genealogy collection in North America. The collection contains 350,000 printed volumes and 513,000 items of microfilm and microfiche.

=== Festivals and events ===
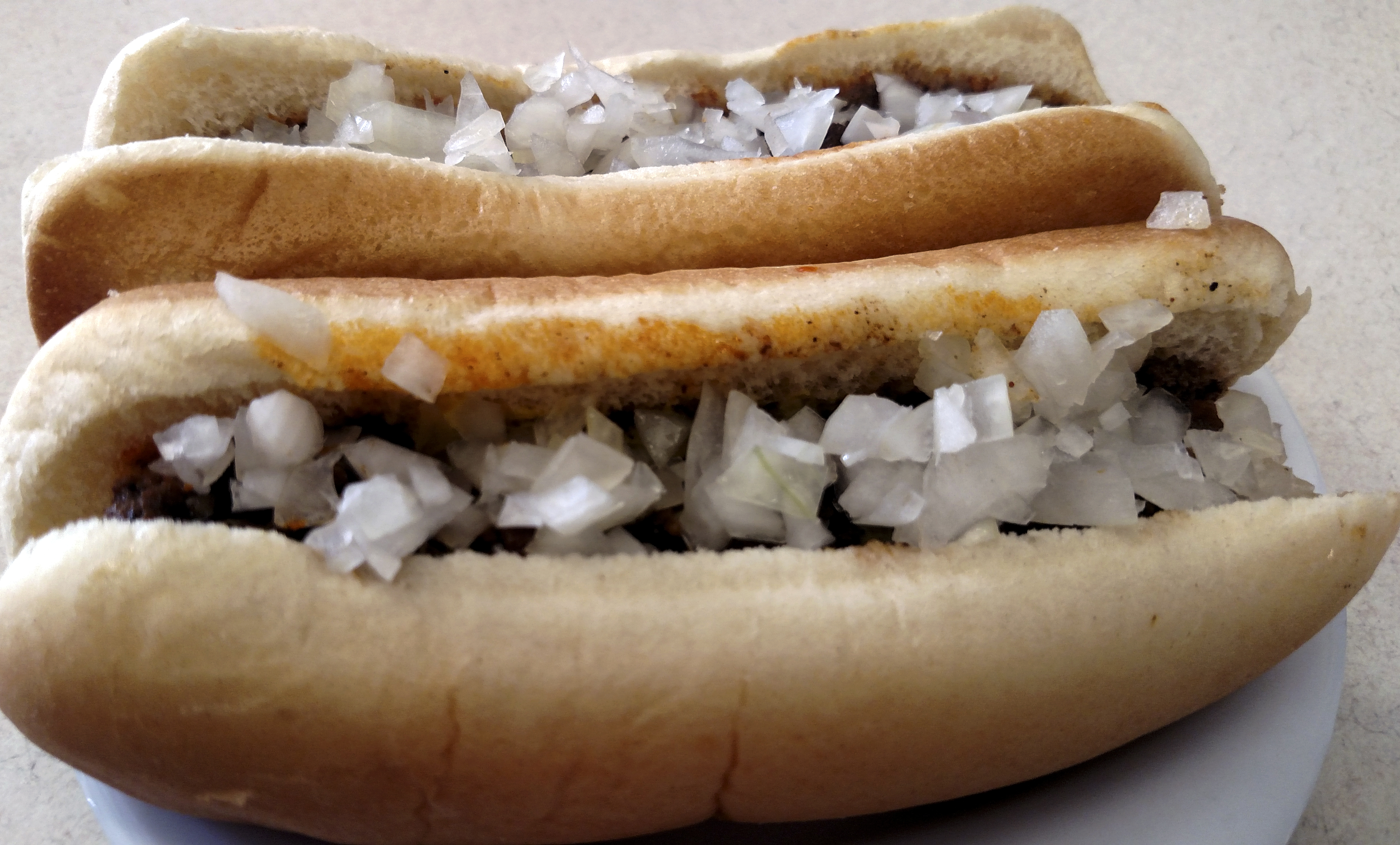
Fort Wayne style Coney Island hot dogs, developed in 1914 by Macedonian immigrants in the city

The city hosts a variety of cultural festivals and events annually. Festivals commemorating ethnic food, dance, music, and art include Germanfest, Greek Festival, and Japanese Cherry Blossom Festival. Initiated in 1997, Fort Wayne Pride celebrates northeast Indiana's LGBTQ community. BBQ RibFest showcases barbecue rib cooks and live entertainment, attracting 40,000 visitors annually.

Fort4Fitness is a certified half marathon, 4-mile (6.4 km) run/walk, and health fair. Over 9,000 participated in the 2011 half marathon. In 2012, Fort4Fitness debuted a spring cycle, Bike-the-Fort, which included three bicycling tours with over 1,000 participants. HolidayFest begins with the Night of Lights on Thanksgiving eve, with the lighting of the PNC Santa and Reindeer, Wells Fargo Holiday Display, and Indiana Michigan Power Christmas Wreath, ending with a fireworks finale at Parkview Field.

The largest annual events in the city are the Johnny Appleseed Festival, Taste of the Arts, Middlewaves and the Three Rivers Festival. The Johnny Appleseed Festival draws 300,000 visitors. The festival is held at Johnny Appleseed Park, where American folklore legend John Chapman is believed to be buried. Apple-themed cuisine, crafts, and historical demonstrations recalling 19th century American pioneering are among some of the festival's events. Three Rivers Festival, a celebration of Fort Wayne, spans nine days each July, attracting 400,000 visitors. Three Rivers features over 200 events, including a parade, midway, hot dog eating contest, bed race, raft race, arts fair, and fireworks spectacular. Other annual events include the Allen County Fair, BAALS Music Festival, National Soccer Festival, and the Vera Bradley Outlet Sale.

== Sports ==
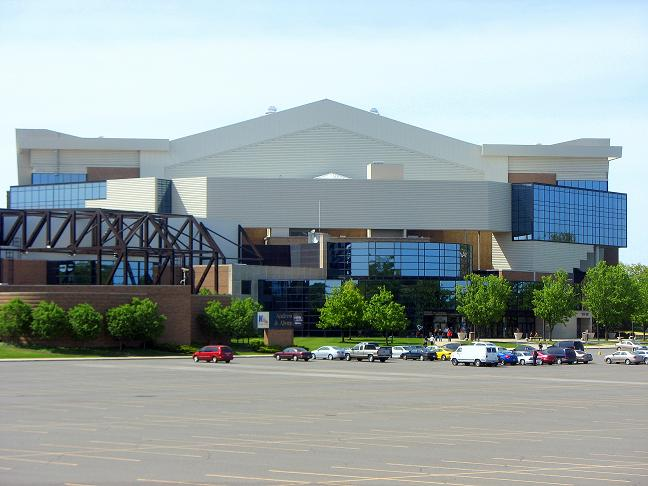
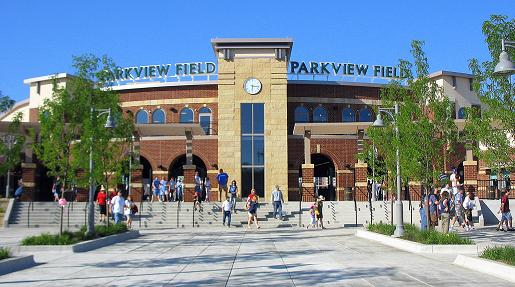
Allen County War Memorial Coliseum (top) and Parkview Field (bottom)

Fort Wayne is home to three minor league professional sports franchises: the Fort Wayne Komets of the ECHL, the Fort Wayne TinCaps of the Midwest League, and Fort Wayne FC, a soccer club which competes in the USL1. Other teams based in the city include the Fort Wayne Derby Girls of the Women's Flat Track Derby Association Division 2. Fort Wayne's primary sports venues include the Allen County War Memorial Coliseum, Parkview Field, and Ruoff Mortgage Stadium.

The city has been home to other professional sports franchises, including the National Basketball Association's Fort Wayne Pistons (which moved to Detroit in 1957), the Fort Wayne Daisies of the All-American Girls Professional Baseball League, and the Fort Wayne Kekiongas of the National Association of Professional Base Ball Players (precursor to Major League Baseball).

Intercollegiate sports in the city include the Purdue Fort Wayne Mastodons, representing Purdue University Fort Wayne (PFW) in the NCAA's Division I Horizon League, and NAIA schools Indiana Tech (Wolverine–Hoosier Athletic Conference) and University of Saint Francis (Crossroads League and Mid-States Football Association). The Mastodons had represented Indiana University–Purdue University Fort Wayne (IPFW) prior to its 2018 split into two separate institutions (see below), and from 2016 to 2018 were branded as the Fort Wayne Mastodons, but the athletic brand was changed to "Purdue Fort Wayne" shortly before the split took effect.

Some notable events in sports history occurred in Fort Wayne. On June 2, 1883, Fort Wayne hosted the Quincy Professionals for one of the first lighted evening baseball games ever recorded. Fort Wayne is also credited as the birthplace of the NBA, as Pistons' coach Carl Bennett brokered the merger of the BAA and the NBL in 1948 from his Alexander Street home. On March 10, 1961, Wilt Chamberlain became the first player in the NBA to reach 3,000 points in a single season while competing at the War Memorial Coliseum.

== Parks and recreation ==
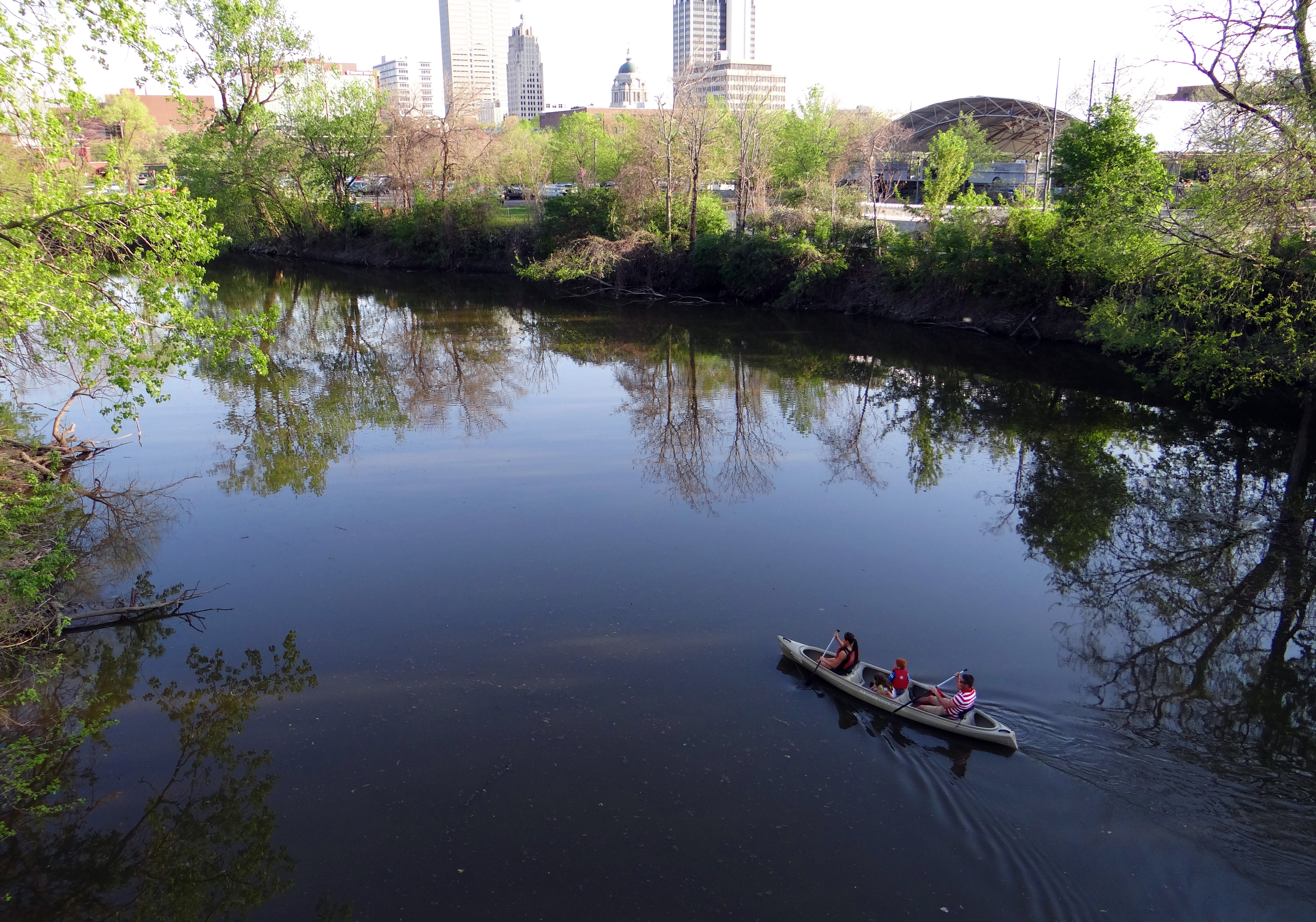
Canoeing on the St. Marys River

Fort Wayne Parks and Recreation maintains 86 public parks totaling 2,805 acres (1,135 ha). Over 20 public and private golf courses are located in Allen County. Several notable parks include Johnny Appleseed Park (home to a campground and John Chapman's grave), McCulloch Park (home to Samuel Bigger's grave), and the Old Fort Park (The first and oldest park in Fort Wayne, site of the original well used in this fort). Downtown, there are a number of parks including Foellinger-Freimann Botanical Conservatory, Headwaters Park, Promenade Park, Swinney Park, and Lawton Park (named for Major-General Henry Lawton), which includes a skate park. Franke Park is the most extensive city park, covering 339.24 acres (137.3 ha). Franke is home to the Foellinger Theatre, Shoaff Lake, and the Fort Wayne Zoo.

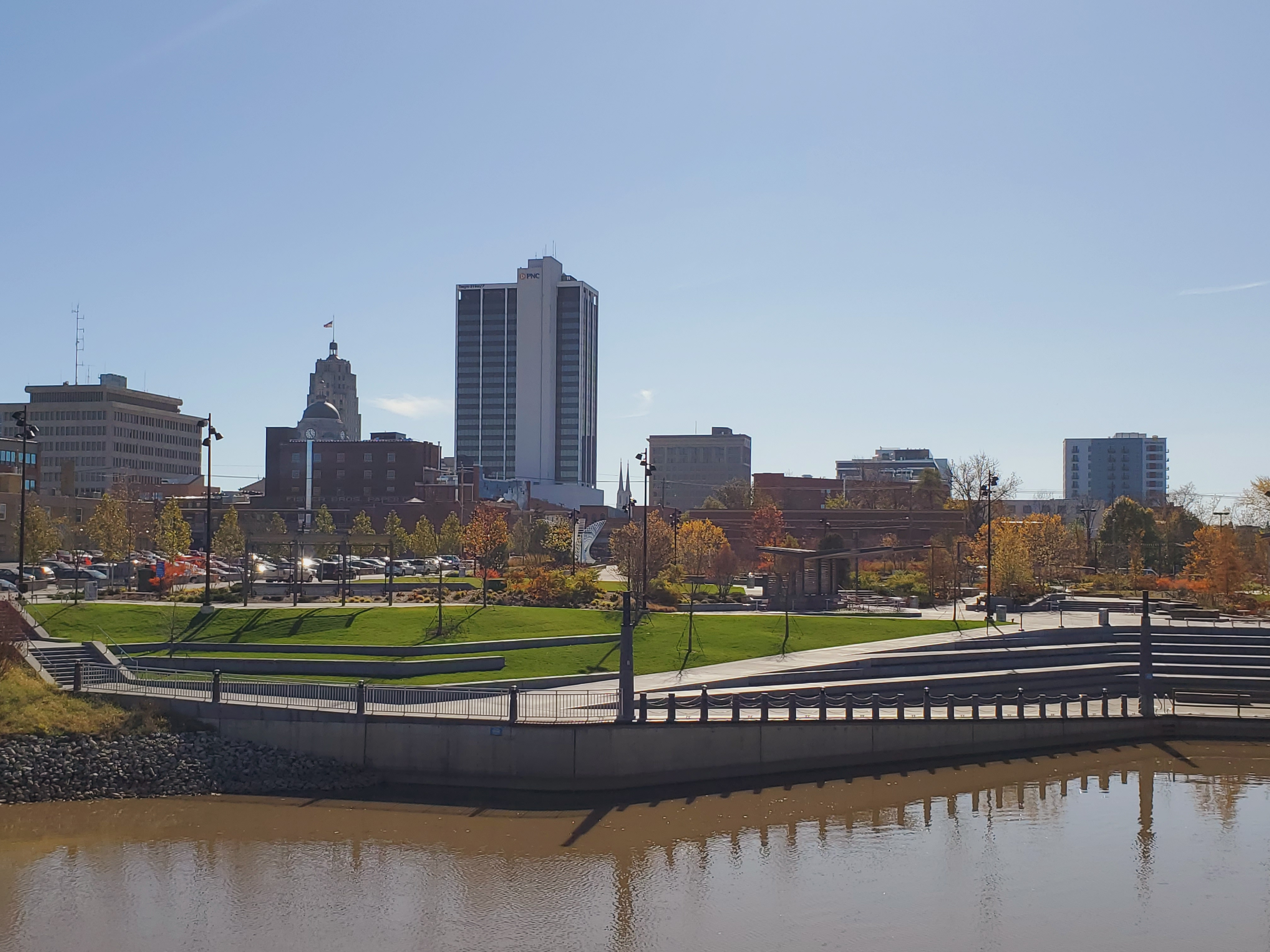
The Fort Wayne skyline and the St. Marys River viewed from Promenade Park

Starting in the 1970s, the city developed a system of recreational trails along the riverbanks, known as the Rivergreenway, with the aim of beautifying the riverfronts and promoting active lifestyles for residents. The Rivergreenway was designated a National Recreation Trail in 2009. As of 2018, the Rivergreenway had expanded with additional trails to encompass nearly 180 miles (290 km) throughout the city and county, with about 550,000 annual users. With the expansion of trails in recent years, cycling has become an emerging mode of transportation for residents. In 2009, the city's first bicycle lanes were established with the installation of 250 bike parking places. In 2016, Fort Wayne was designated a Bronze Level bicycle friendly community by the League of American Bicyclists.

Hurshtown Reservoir, near Grabill, is the largest body of water in Allen County and is popular with watersports enthusiasts for sailing and fishing. Some 300 lakes are located within 50 miles (80 km) of the city. Located downtown along the St. Marys River, Fort Wayne Outfitters offers canoe, kayak, stand-up paddle board, and pontoon boat rentals for recreation along the three rivers.

According to the Trust for Public Land's 2017 ParkScore Index, some 56% of Fort Wayne residents are underserved.

== Government ==
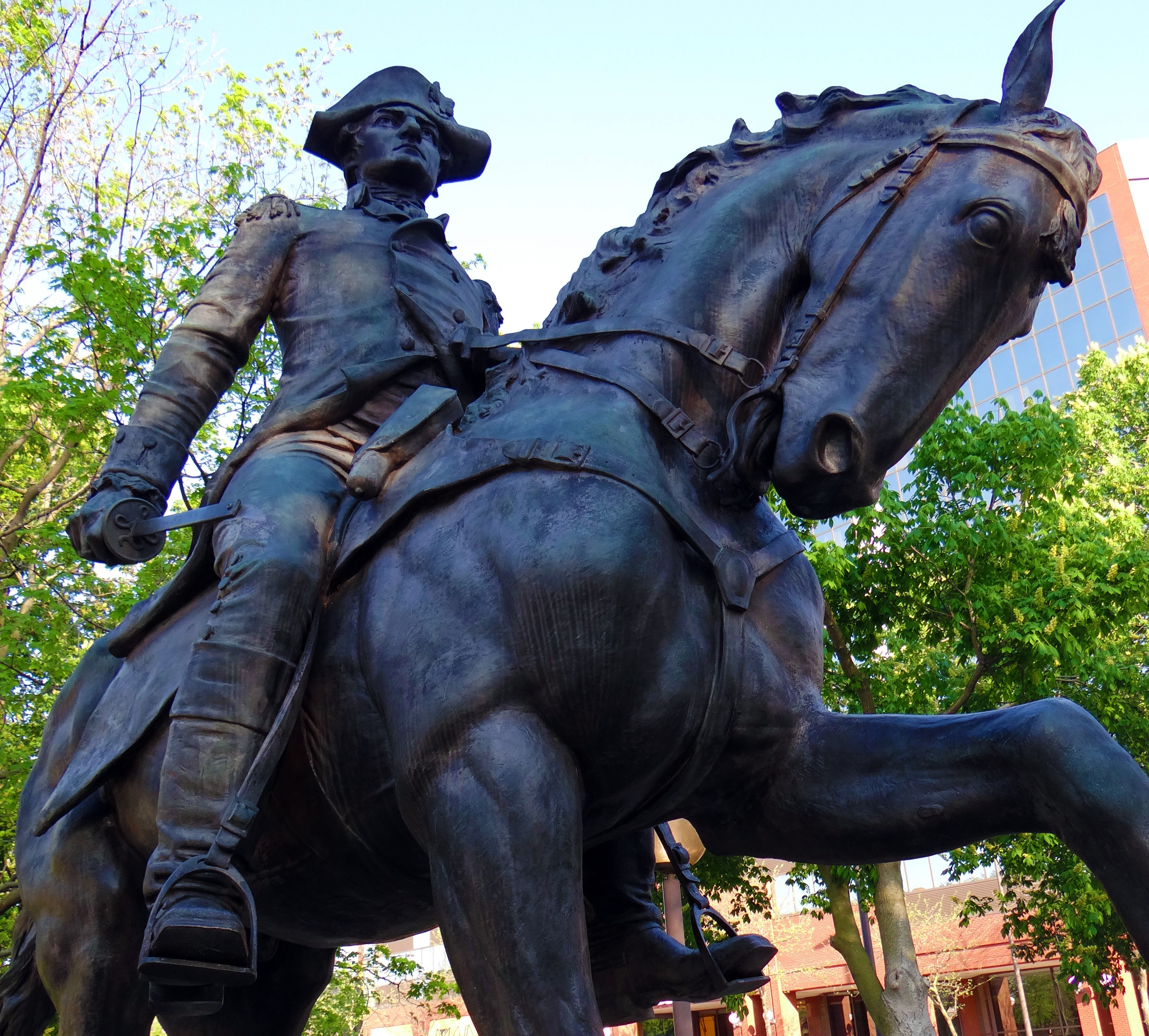
A statue of General "Mad" Anthony Wayne, namesake of the city, stands in Freimann Square.

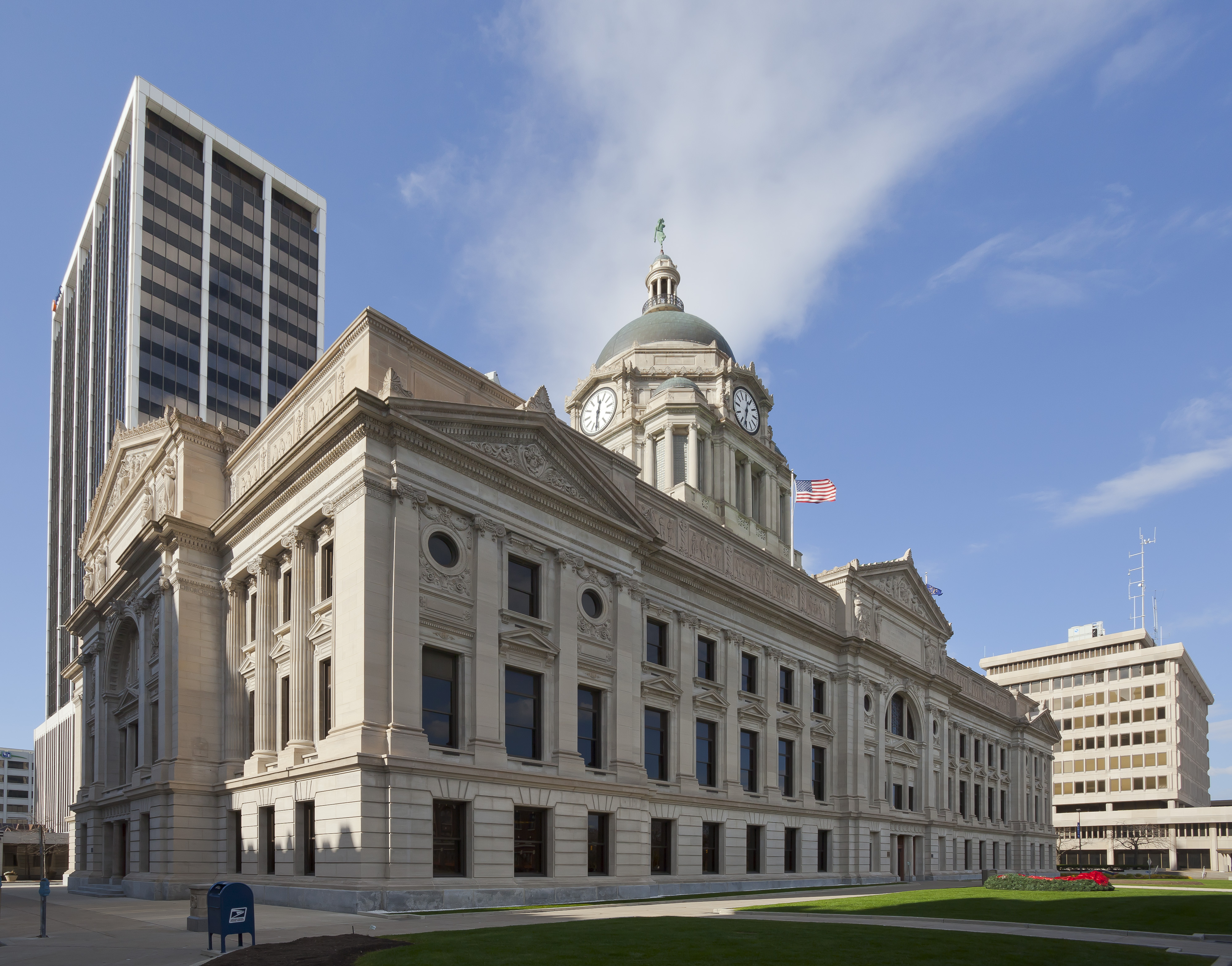
The Allen County Courthouse and the Rousseau Centre (background right) in downtown Fort Wayne house county-level government offices.

Fort Wayne has a mayor–council government. The mayor, city clerk, and city council members serve four-year terms. Citizens Square houses the executive and legislative branches of city government. As the county seat of Allen County, Fort Wayne serves as the administrative center for county-level elected offices and government functions.

Fort Wayne's current mayor is Sharon Tucker, a Democrat. Tucker, a former county and city councilwoman, succeeded record-four-term mayor Tom Henry, who died from stomach cancer in March 2024. Tucker won a county party caucus to finish the term of Henry, making her the city's first Black mayor. Fort Wayne City Council has nine elected members, one representative from each of the city's six council districts and three at-large members, serving four-year terms.

The city is represented in the Indiana General Assembly by three Senate Districts and seven House Districts. Fort Wayne's state senators include Dennis Kruse (14th District), Liz Brown (15th), and David Long (16th). Representatives include Dan Leonard (50th District), Ben Smaltz (52nd), Phil GiaQuinta (80th), Martin Carbaugh (81st), Christopher Judy (83rd), Bob Morris (84th), and Dave Heine (85th). Federally, Fort Wayne is part of Indiana's 3rd congressional district, represented by Republican Marlin Stutzman, who had previously held the position from 2010 to 2017.

Under the Unigov provision of Indiana Law, Fort Wayne would have automatically consolidated with Allen County when its population exceeded 250,000, previously the minimum population for a first class city in Indiana. Fort Wayne nearly met the state requirements for first class city designation on January 1, 2006, when 12.8 square miles (33 km^{2}) of neighboring Aboite Township (and a small section of Wayne Township) including 25,094 people were annexed. However, a 2004 legislative change raised the population threshold for first-class status from 250,000 to 600,000, which ensured Indianapolis' status as the only first class city in Indiana.

Fort Wayne's E. Ross Adair Federal Building and U.S. Courthouse houses the United States District Court for the Northern District of Indiana, which was authorized by Congress in 1928.

=== Public safety ===
Municipal and state laws are enforced by the Fort Wayne Police Department, an organization of 460 officers. In 2006, Fort Wayne's crime rate was 5104.1 per 100,000 people, slightly above the national average of 4479.3. There were 18 murders, 404 robberies, and 2,128 burglaries in 2006. Steve Reed was appointed to the position of police chief in 2016. In 2014, former police chief Rusty York was appointed to the position of director of public safety. York previously served as police chief from 2000 to 2014.

The city is currently served by the Allen County Jail in downtown Fort Wayne, controlled by the Allen County Sheriff's department. In January 2020, a class action lawsuit was filed by Vincent Morris, an inmate at the jail, and the ACLU of Indiana against the Sheriff of Allen County. The lawsuit alleges understaffing of the jail, as well as overpopulation, among other complaints resulting in dangerous housing conditions. In March 2022, Judge Damon Leichty of the United States District Court for the Northern District of Indiana ruled that conditions in the jail were in violation of the 8th Amendment and 14th Amendment. In his injunction, Judge Leichty ruled that there needed to be substantial progress in the construction of a new jail with expanding capacity. Since this injunction there have been 8 proposed sites for the new jail to be constructed, with the most prominent being at the Allen County Sheriffs department training facility land off of Paulding and Adams Center Roads, which the county already owns. However, this location is being heavily contested for being on the Southeast side of Fort Wayne, as another negative for an already disadvantaged area. At its current location, the jail also sits on what is very valuable land given the city's recent riverfront development, right in between some hallmark developments for the revitalization of the downtown area.

As of 2010, the Fort Wayne Fire Department included 375 uniformed firefighters and 18 fire stations. Eric Lahey was appointed fire chief in 2014.

=== Politics ===
Voter registration and Partisan Primary Participation
Party	Number of voters	Percentage
Democratic	31,798	20.61%
Republican	35,452	22.97%
Unaffiliated	86,154	55.83%
Other	917	0.59%
Total	154,321	100%

== Education ==
=== Primary and secondary education ===
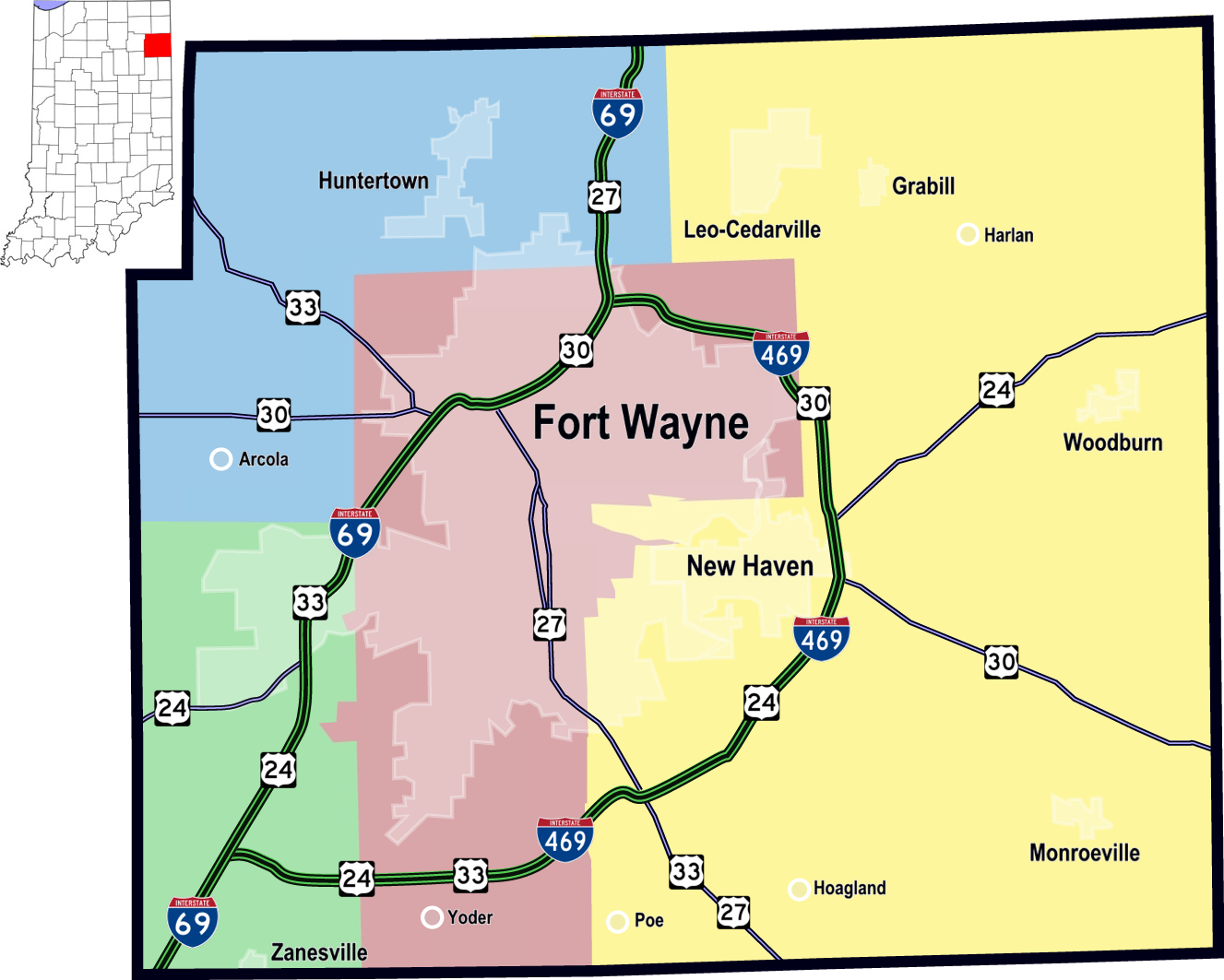
Allen County public school districts: FWCS (pink), EACS (yellow), NACS (blue), SACS (green)

Four K–12 public school districts serve portions of the city. Fort Wayne Community Schools (FWCS) is the largest public school district in Indiana, enrolling nearly 31,000 students in the 2013–2014 academic year. FWCS operate 51 facilities, including 31 elementary schools, ten middle schools, and five high schools. The student body is diverse, with 75 spoken languages in the district. East Allen County Schools (EACS) operate 14 schools, with a total enrollment of 10,010. Northwest Allen County Schools (NACS) operate seven elementary schools, two middle schools, and one high school, with a total enrollment of 6,853. Southwest Allen County Schools (SACS) operate six elementary schools, two middle schools, and one high school, with a total enrollment of 6,995. Private primary and secondary education is offered largely through Lutheran Schools of Indiana and the Roman Catholic Diocese of Fort Wayne–South Bend. Amish Parochial Schools of Indiana oversees schooling through the eighth grade in rural eastern Allen County.

=== Higher education ===
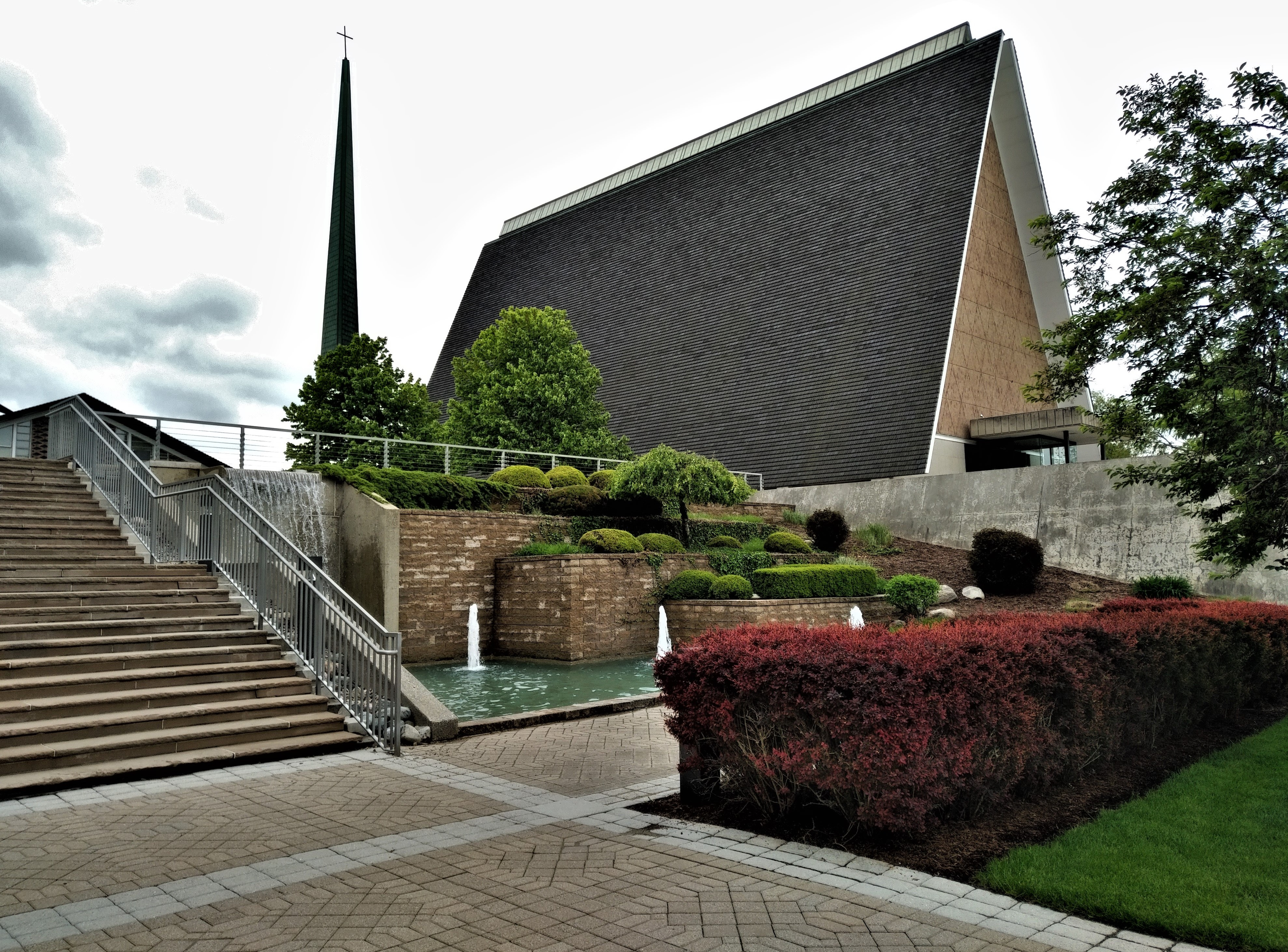
Kramer Chapel on the Concordia Theological Seminary campus

Fort Wayne hosts regional campuses affiliated with both of Indiana's major state university systems. Indiana University Fort Wayne (IU Fort Wayne) and Purdue University Fort Wayne (PFW) were established in 2018 following the dissolution of their predecessor institution, Indiana University–Purdue University Fort Wayne (IPFW). IPFW's degree programs in health sciences were transferred to IU Fort Wayne; as such, that institution is now home to the Fort Wayne Center for Medical Education, a branch of the Indiana University School of Medicine. All remaining IPFW degree programs were taken over by PFW. Indiana's community college system, Ivy Tech, manages two campuses and several learning sites throughout the city.

Three private universities are based in Fort Wayne. Concordia Theological Seminary is a seminary affiliated with the Lutheran Church–Missouri Synod. Established in 1846, it is the oldest higher education institution in the city. Indiana Tech, founded in 1930, has a full-time enrollment of about 3,900 students. In 1890, the Sisters of St. Francis of Perpetual Adoration established the University of Saint Francis, later relocating the Catholic institution to Fort Wayne in 1944. In 2023, it had a full-time enrollment of about 1,700 students. Several private institutions operate branch campuses in the city, including the College of Biblical Studies, Huntington University, Indiana Wesleyan University, Manchester University, and Trine University.

=== Libraries ===
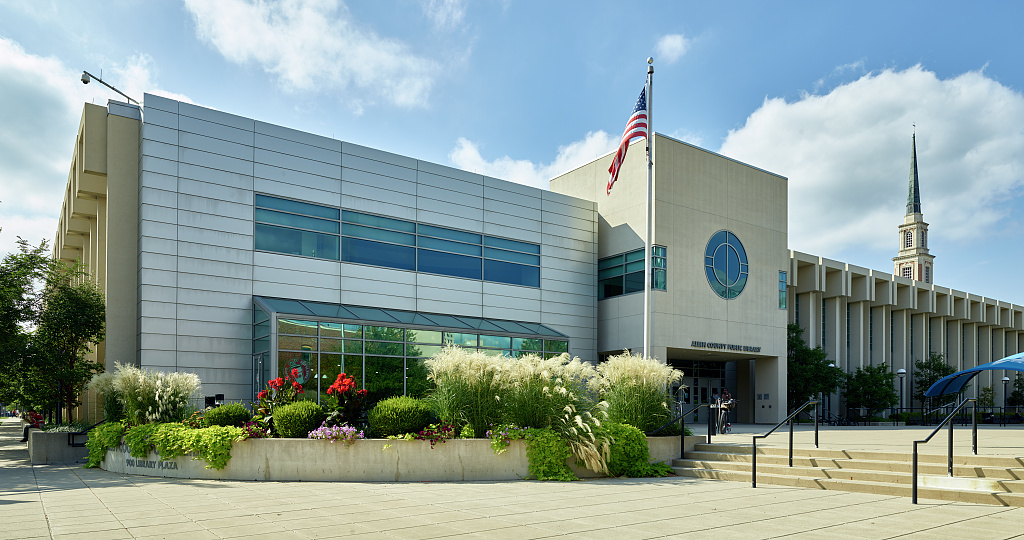
Main Library of the Allen County Public Library in downtown Fort Wayne

Fort Wayne is home to the main library and thirteen branches of the Allen County Public Library. It is among the 20 largest public library systems in the U.S., and ranks 89th factoring in academic libraries, with 3.4 million volumes. The library's foundation is also among the nation's largest, with $14 million in assets. The entire library system underwent an $84.1 million overhaul from 2002 to 2007. In 2009, over 7.4 million materials were borrowed by patrons, with over 3 million visits made throughout the library system. The Main Library in downtown Fort Wayne houses the second-largest genealogical research collection in the U.S.

== Media ==
Major broadcasting network affiliates include WANE-TV (CBS), WPTA-TV (ABC/NBC), WISE-TV (CW), WFFT-TV (Fox), and WFWA-TV (PBS), Northeast Indiana's PBS member station. Religious broadcasters include WINM. Access Fort Wayne maintains Fort Wayne and Allen County's Public Access capabilities serving from the Allen County Public Library. One National Public Radio station is based in the city, WBOI, with the WELT Community Radio Station transmitting from the Allen County Public Library since 2016.

Fort Wayne is served by one newspaper, the Journal Gazette. The newspaper is offered six days weekly, Monday through Saturday. Fort Wayne was previously served by the News-Sentinel which ceased operations on April 23, 2020.

In the early 1970s, an alternative newspaper called the Fort Wayne Free Press was published in the city.

== Infrastructure ==
=== Transportation ===
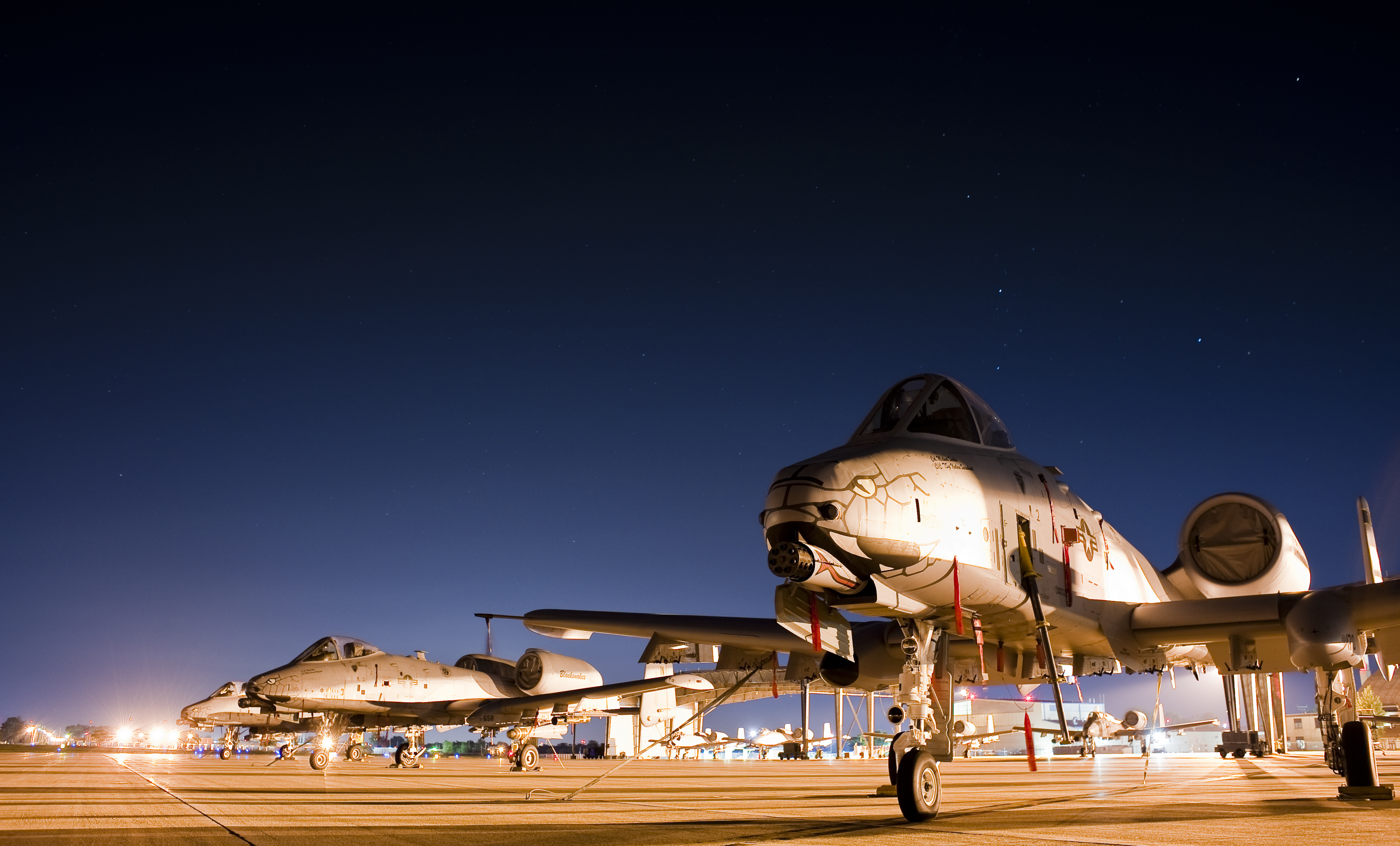
An A-10 Warthog after completing a training mission at the Fort Wayne Air National Guard Base

Fort Wayne includes two municipal airports, both managed by the Fort Wayne–Allen County Airport Authority. Fort Wayne International Airport (FWA) is the city's primary commercial airport, with five airlines offering direct service to 13 domestic connections. The airport is Indiana's second busiest, with over 350,000 passenger enplanements in 2015. Fort Wayne International is also home to the 122nd Fighter Wing's Fort Wayne Air National Guard Base. Smith Field, in northern Fort Wayne, is used primarily for general aviation.

Fort Wayne is served by a single Interstate, (Interstate 69), along with an auxiliary beltway (Interstate 469). Once the State Road 37 expressway between Bloomington and Martinsville is completed in 2018, filling a gap in I-69 that exists south of Indianapolis, the road will run south to Evansville; it currently runs north to the Canada–United States border at Port Huron, Michigan. In the coming years, I-69 will extend to the US–Mexico border in Texas, with branches ending in Laredo, Pharr, and Brownsville. Four U.S. Routes bisect the city, including US 24, US 27, US 30, and US 33.

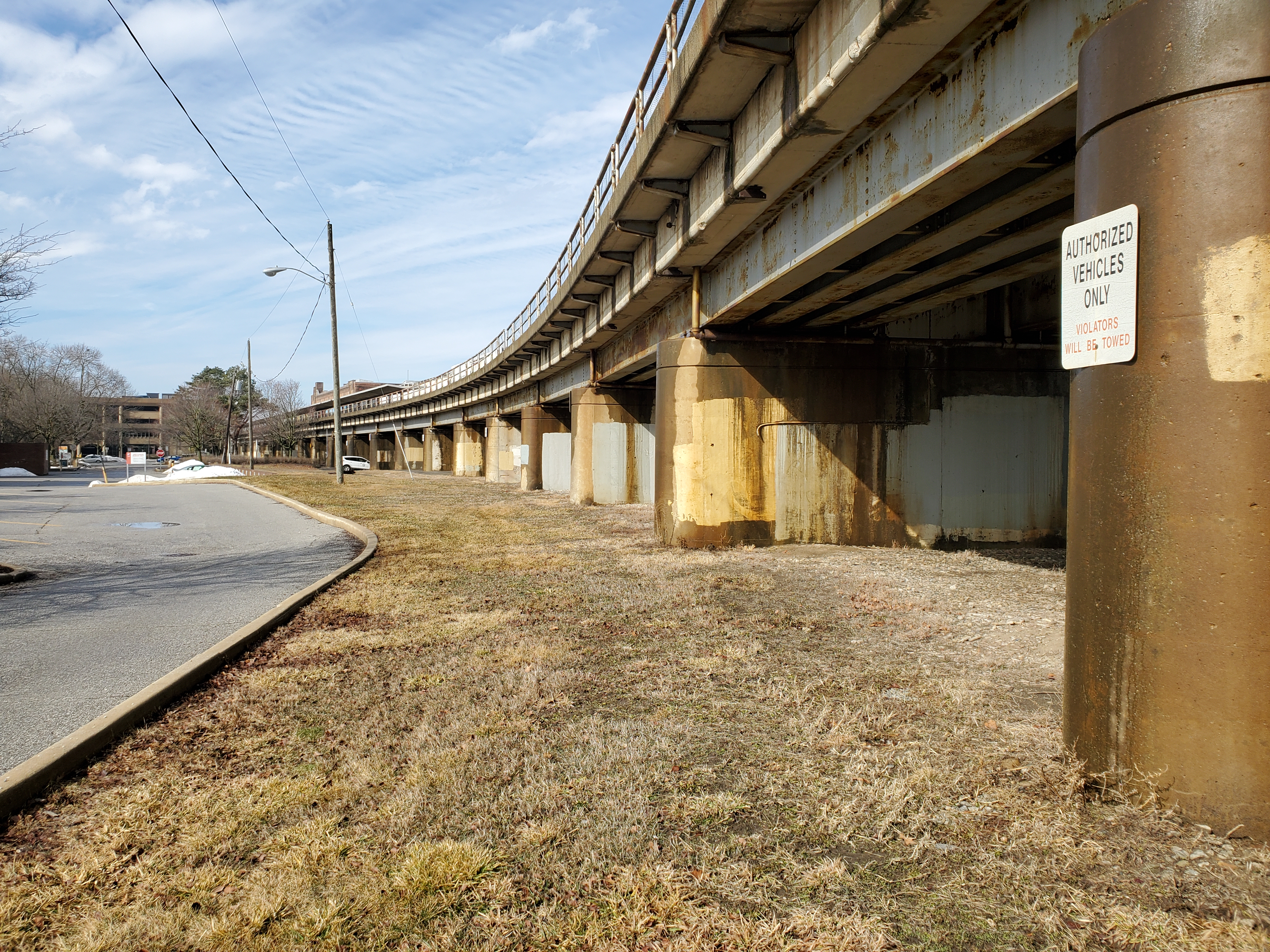
Nickel Plate Road viaduct in downtown Fort Wayne

Five Indiana State Roads also meet in the city, including State Road 1, State Road 3, State Road 14, State Road 37, and State Road 930. Airport Expressway, a four-lane divided highway, links Fort Wayne International Airport directly to I-69. About 85 percent of residents commute alone by personal vehicle, while another eight percent carpool.

Unlike most cities comparable to its size, Fort Wayne does not have an urban freeway system. In 1946, planners proposed a $27 million federally funded freeway, crossing east–west and north–south through downtown. Opponents successfully campaigned against the proposal, objecting to the demolition of nearly 1,500 homes at the time of the post-World War II housing shortage, while playing on fears that the project would force displaced minorities into white neighborhoods. In 1947, Fort Wayne residents voted down the referendum that would have allowed for its construction, dubbed the 'Anthony Wayne Parkway.' Beginning in 1962, construction commenced for I-69 in suburban Fort Wayne.

The I-469 beltway around the southern and eastern fringes of Fort Wayne and New Haven was constructed between 1988 and 1995 as the largest public works project in Allen County history, at $207 million.

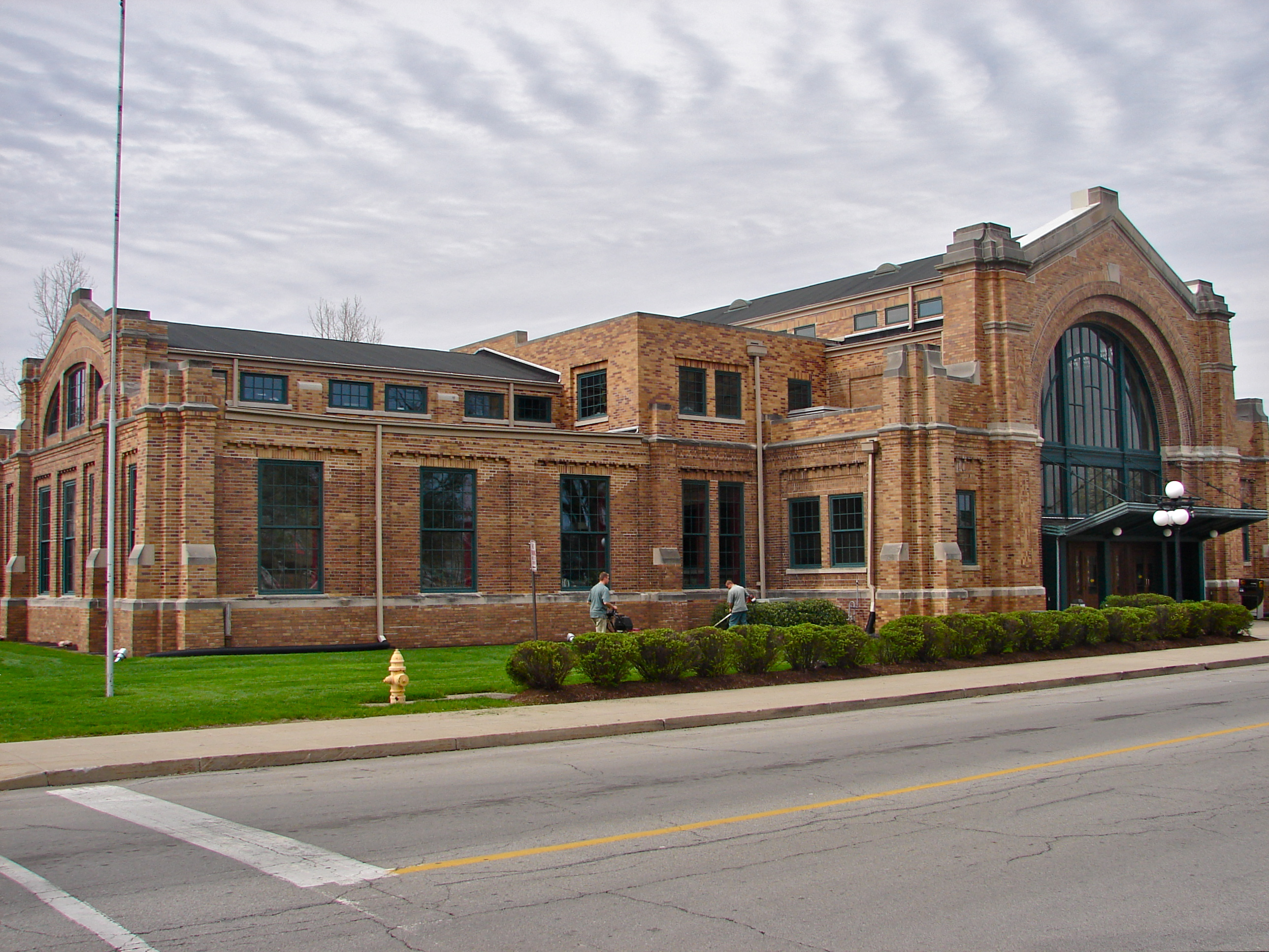
Pennsylvania Railroad Station has stood as a landmark to the city's railroad heritage since 1914.

Amtrak's Capitol Limited (Chicago—Toledo—Cleveland—Pittsburgh—Washington, D.C.) and Amtrak's Lake Shore Limited (Chicago—Toledo—Cleveland—Buffalo—Albany—split to Boston and to New York City) are the closest passenger rail services to Fort Wayne, located 25 miles (40 km) north at Waterloo Station. Service by Amtrak ended in 1990 when the Broadway Limited was rerouted away from Fort Wayne's Pennsylvania Station. Until 1961 the Pennsylvania Railroad operated the north–south Northern Arrow through the station. Other stations in Fort Wayne served the passenger trains of the Chicago, Indianapolis, and Louisville Railway ('Monon Railroad') and the Wabash Railroad (hosting the east–west Wabash Cannon Ball).

There has been a movement to bring direct passenger rail service back in the form of Amtrak or high-speed rail service. In 2013, a feasibility study was published outlining the impacts of a proposed Columbus—Fort Wayne—Chicago high-speed rail corridor. At 300 miles (480 km), the route would cost $1.29 billion and generate some $7.1 billion in economic benefits to the region. Freight service is provided by a class I railroad (Norfolk Southern) and two class III railroads. Fort Wayne is headquarters and main operations hub of Norfolk Southern's Triple Crown Services subsidiary, the largest truckload shipper in the U.S.

Citilink operates and manages the city's public bus system, including paratransit and fixed-route service in the cities of Fort Wayne and New Haven via downtown's Central Station. CampusLink debuted in 2009 as a free shuttle service for students, faculty, and general public traveling between Ivy Tech's Coliseum and North campuses, IPFW and its student housing on the Waterfield Campus, and shopping and residential areas. MedLink debuted in 2013, connecting Parkview Regional Medical Center with Parkview Health's Randallia campus. Despite annual ridership of 2.2 million, less than one percent of residents commute by public transportation. Fort Wayne is served by two intercity bus providers: Greyhound Lines (Indianapolis—Toledo—Detroit) and Lakefront Lines (Chicago—Columbus—Akron).

In 2016, the city introduced its first bike-sharing program, including five stations and 25 bicycles.

=== Healthcare ===
Healthcare in the Fort Wayne area is primarily provided by two nonprofit healthcare systems headquartered in the city: Parkview Health and Lutheran Health Network. Notable hospitals include Dupont Hospital, Lutheran Hospital of Indiana, Parkview Hospital Randallia, and Parkview Regional Medical Center. Over 1,600 patient beds are available throughout the city's healthcare system.

As of 2017, both healthcare systems were Fort Wayne's largest and second-largest employers, respectively, contributing to a total healthcare workforce in Allen County of 34,000. In 2018, Indiana University Health opened its first facility in the city with plans for future growth. VA Northern Indiana Health Care System's Fort Wayne Campus provides medical services through the Department of Veterans Affairs.

=== Utilities ===
City Utilities is the largest municipally owned water utility in Indiana, supplying residents with 72 million US gallons (270,000 m^{3}) of water per day from the St. Joseph River via the Three Rivers Water Filtration Plant. Sanitary sewer treatment is also managed by City Utilities. The city of Fort Wayne offers full curbside recycling and solid waste collection services for residents, currently contracted through GFL Environmental. Electricity is provided by Indiana Michigan Power, a subsidiary of American Electric Power, while natural gas is supplied by Northern Indiana Public Service Company (NIPSCO), a subsidiary of NiSource. All tier 1 networks and several additional telecommunication service providers cover the Fort Wayne rate area.

== Sister cities ==
Fort Wayne has four sister cities as designated by Sister Cities International:

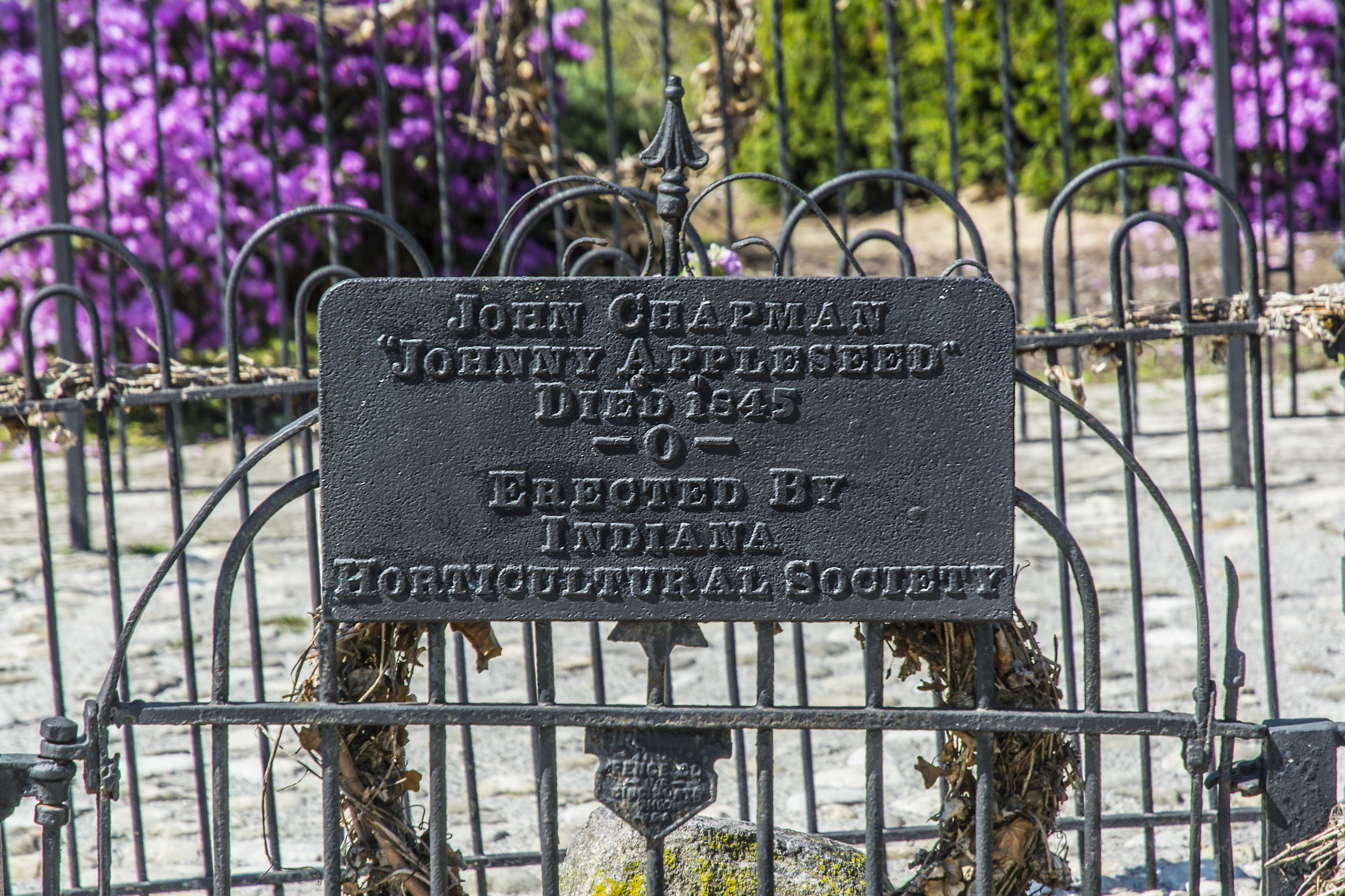
John Chapman's grave in Johnny Appleseed Park

- Takaoka, Toyama, Japan (1977)
- Płock, Masovian, Poland (1990)
- Gera, Thuringia, Germany (1992)
- Taizhou, Zhejiang, China (2012)

Friendship city

- Mawlamyine, Mon State, Burma (Myanmar) (2015)

== See also ==
- Fort Wayne (fort)
- Anthony Wayne Institute
- Kekionga
- Fort Miami
- List of public art in Fort Wayne, Indiana
- Northern Indiana
- Siege of Fort Wayne

== Bibliography ==
- Beatty, John D. (2006). History of Fort Wayne & Allen County, Indiana, 1700–2005. M.T. Publishing Company. ISBN 1-932439-44-7.
- Brice, Wallace. History of Fort Wayne (Applewood Books, 2009) online.
- Brown, Nancy Eileen. "The 1901 Fort Wayne, Indiana City Election: A Political Dialogue of Ethnic Tension" (IUPUI Diss. 2013)
- Griswold, Bert J. (1973). Fort Wayne, Gateway of the West. AMS Press. ISBN 0-404-07133-3.
- Morgan, Iwan. "Fort Wayne and the Great Depression: The Early Years, 1929-1933." Indiana Magazine of History (1984): 122–145. online
- Murphey, Kathleen A. "Schooling, Teaching, and Change in Nineteenth-Century Fort Wayne, Indiana." Indiana Magazine of History (1998): 1-28. online
- Robertson, Nellie A. "John Hays and the Fort Wayne Indian Agency." Indiana Magazine of History (1943): 221–236.
- Scott, Clifford H. "Hoosier Kulturkampf: Anglo-German Cultural Conflicts in Fort Wayne, 1840-1920." Journal of German-American Studies 15.1 (1980): 9–18. online
- Seigel, Peggy. "Pushing the Color Line: Race and Employment in Fort Wayne, Indiana, 1933-1963." Indiana Magazine of History (2008): 241–276. online
- Seigel, Peggy. "Winning the Vote in Fort Wayne, Indiana: The Long, Cautious Journey in a German American City." Indiana Magazine of History (2006): 220–257. online
