= Little River (Indiana) =

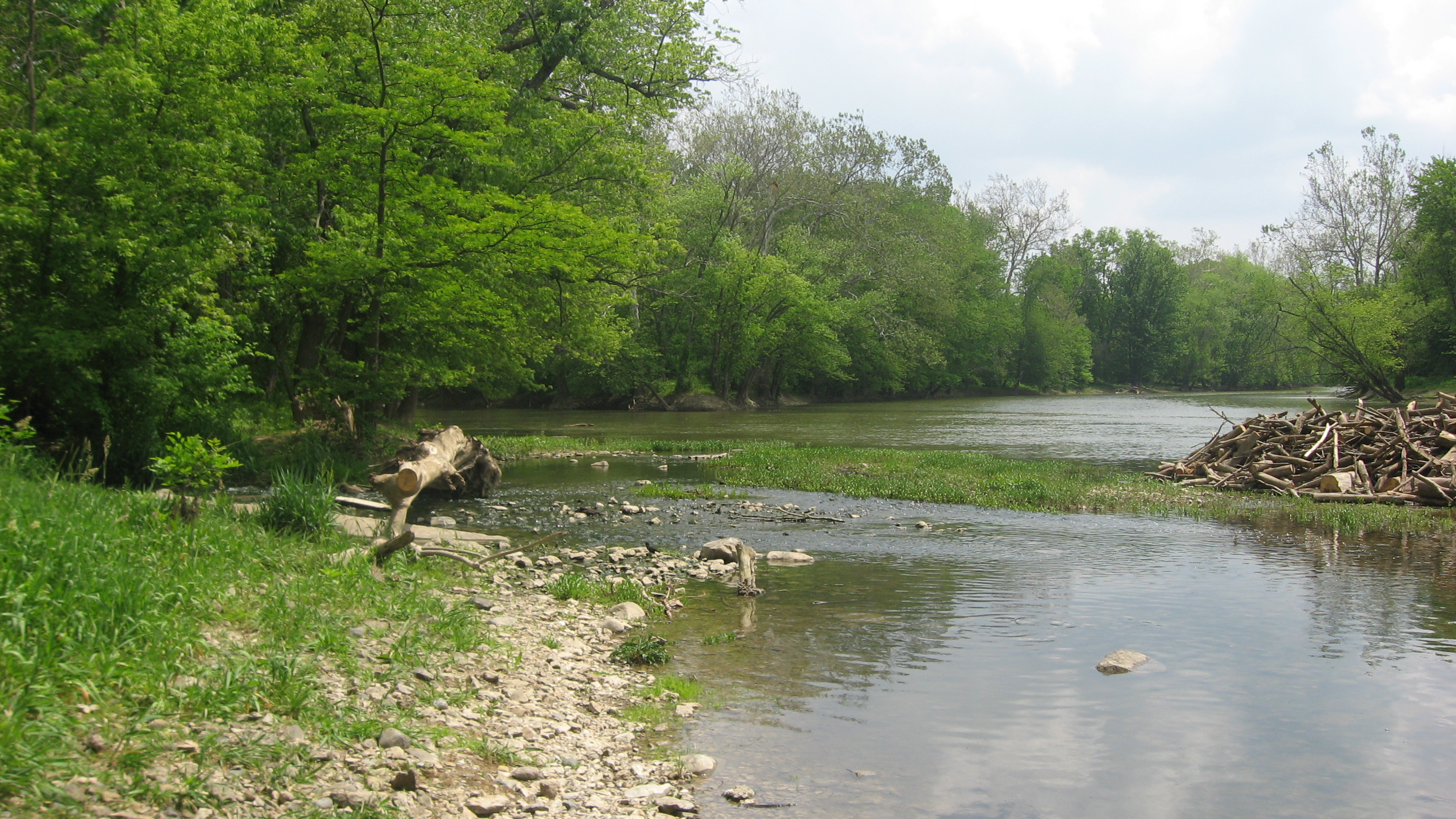
Confluence of the Wabash and Little Wabash Rivers at Huntington

The Little River is a 22.6-mile-long (36.4 km) stream in Allen and Huntington counties in northeastern Indiana. A tributary of the Wabash River, it is sometimes called the "Little Wabash", which may cause it to be confused with the Little Wabash River of Illinois. The river drains an area of 287.9 square miles (746 km^{2}).

The Little River follows the Wabash-Erie Channel or "sluiceway," a remnant of the Maumee Torrent that drained ancient Glacial Lake Maumee at the end of the Wisconsin glaciation, and joins the Wabash just west of Huntington.

The Little River is part of the Wabash River Heritage Corridor, created by the Indiana General Assembly in 1991 to commemorate the historic portage that linked the Wabash River watershed with that of Lake Erie.

Its source is located approximately 1 mile (1.6 km) southwest of the Ardmore Knolls neighborhood of Fort Wayne, at 41°1′13″N 85°12′4″W, and its mouth is located in Huntington at 40°52′35″N 85°31′51″W, at a park known as the Forks of the Wabash.

At Huntington, Indiana, the Little River has a mean annual discharge of 256 cubic feet per second.

== See also ==
- List of rivers of Indiana
- Eagle Marsh
