= Eagle Marsh =

Wetland preserve in Fort Wayne, Indiana, US

Coordinates: 41°02′00″N 85°13′54″W

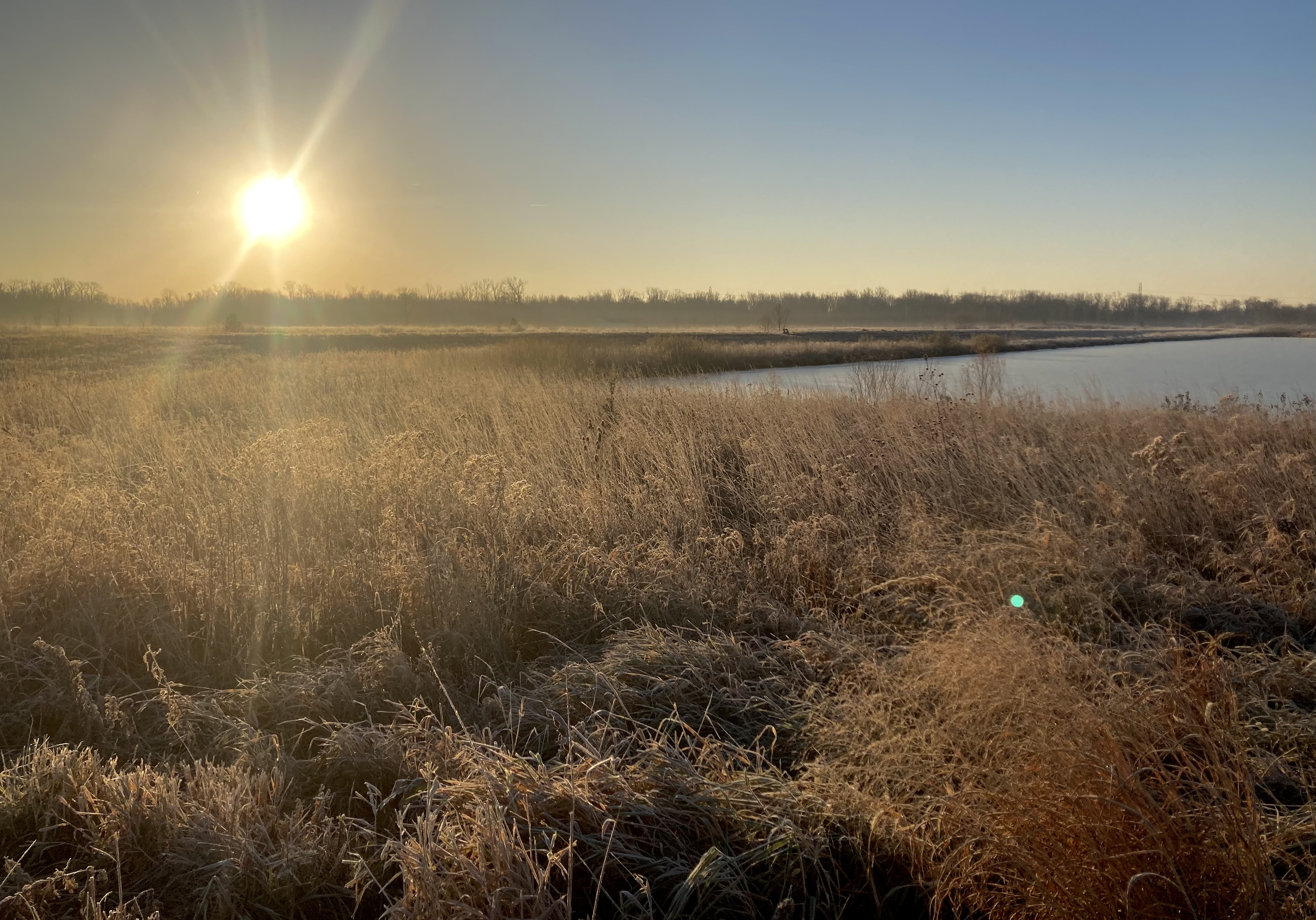
A photo of Eagle Marsh in winter facing one of the perennial ponds Location of Eagle Marsh in Fort Wayne, IN.

Eagle Marsh is an 831-acre (336 ha) wetland preserve located in southwest Fort Wayne, Indiana, United States. It is run by the Little River Wetlands Project, with the aim to restore the Little River watershed, a tributary of the Wabash. Eagle Marsh abuts Interstate 69 on its western boundary and is located on a Continental divide between the Mississippi watershed and the Great Lakes watershed.

Restored wetland and prairie at Eagle Marsh, near Fort Wayne, Indiana, photographed in 2026.

== History ==
The marsh was drained in the 1800s by ditches which changed the hydrology in the area to make it a more suitable location for settlement. Immediately prior to its restoration and purchase in 2005, the property had been farmland which would regularly flood despite the drainage tiles which had been added. The United States Army Corps of Engineers constructed a berm in the marsh to prevent invasive Asian carp from moving into the Great Lakes Basin by reducing the frequency and duration of inter-basin water flows during large rain events.

== Restoration ==
Over 45,000 trees, shrubs, and other native plants have been intentionally planted in the area, bringing back habitat for a multitude of species, including over 240 species of birds. The marsh provides outdoor recreational and educational experiences in the area, with over 14 miles of walking trails and opportunities to see a wide variety of wildlife including the bald eagle, after which the wetland is named.
