= Pokagon =

Pokagon may refer to either of two Potawatomi chiefs:

- Leopold Pokagon
  - Pokagon Band of Potawatomi Indians, his band
- Simon Pokagon, son of Leopold

There are also places named after them:

- Pokagon State Park, Steuben County, Indiana
- Pokagon Township, Michigan, which includes the unincorporated community of Pokagon
