= Siege of Fort Wayne =

Battle of the War of 1812

- Part of the War of 1812
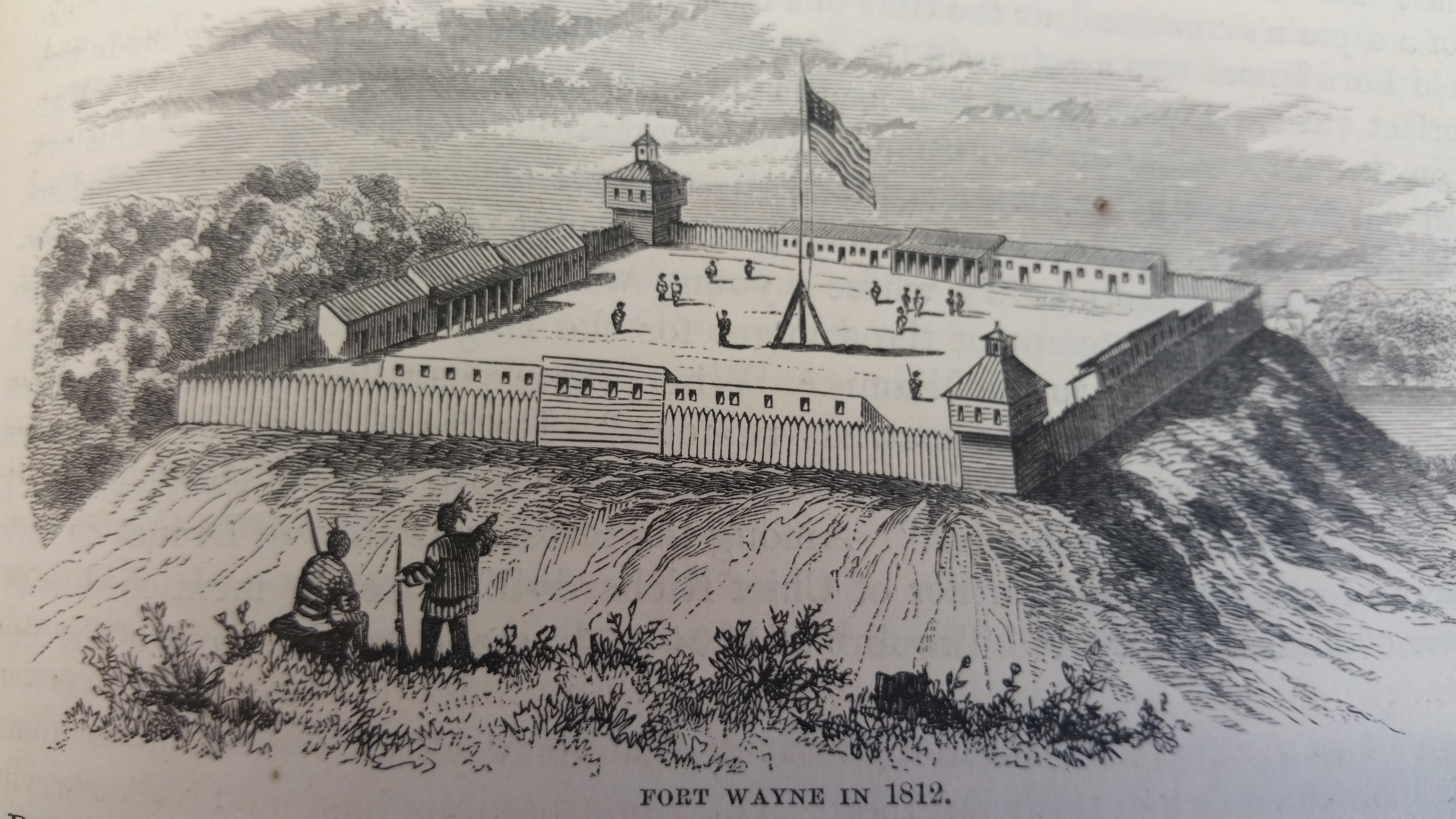
- Fort Wayne
Date	September 5–12, 1812
Location	Fort Wayne, Indiana
Result	American victory

Belligerents
Miami; Potawatomi	United States

Commanders and leaders
Winamac	James Rhea; William Henry Harrison

Strength
500 warriors	100 (garrison); 3,000 (relief force)

Casualties and losses
About 25 killed	Minimal

The siege of Fort Wayne took place from September 5–12, 1812, during the War of 1812. The stand-off occurred in the modern city of Fort Wayne, Indiana, between the U.S. military garrison at Fort Wayne and a combined force of Potawatomi and Miami forces. The conflict began when warriors under the Potawatomi chiefs Winamac and Five Medals killed two members of the U.S. garrison. Over the next several days, the Potawatomi burned the buildings and crops of the fort's adjacent village and launched assaults from outside the fort. Winamac withdrew on September 12 ahead of reinforcements led by Major General William Henry Harrison.

The attack on Fort Wayne was one of several Potawatomi attacks on U.S. military outposts during September 1812. Other coordinated attacks included Fort Dearborn, Fort Harrison, Pigeon Roost, and Fort Madison.

== Background ==
Fort Wayne was established in 1794 by United States forces under Major General Anthony Wayne. It was built at the end of the Northwest Indian War to exert United States influence at a large collection of Native American towns known as Kekionga. The 1809 Treaty of Fort Wayne granted approximately 30 million acres of Native American land to white settlers in Illinois and Indiana and was a major motivator toward anti-expansion resistance. The 1811 Battle of Tippecanoe also served to keep tensions high between Indigenous nations and U.S. settlers.

Captain James Rhea assumed command of Fort Wayne on May 15, 1810. He had served in Wayne's army and had previously commanded Fort Industry. Days after his arrival, Rhea wrote to Colonel Jacob Kingsbury: "I am much pleased with my Command; I hope to be continued here ... at this Post everything has been going on very correct; I mean to take the Tract of Capt. Heald as near as possible ... I have been very will with Rheumatism Pains ever since I left you. I don't know if I ever shall recover, I have not had a Night Sleep in two Weeks."

Rhea soon took note of the fort's inhabitants' tendency for drunkenness, lamenting the behavior as an "abominable [sic] practice" and confiding that he was "Much hurt to see so much intoxication".

Rhea initially proved to be an effective commander, overseeing substantial repairs to the fort, the institution of a sanitation program, and furthered progress on land clearance.

However, Rhea later struggled with alcohol himself, leading to the fort's deterioration. Historian Charles Poinsatte called this a "striking reversal," writing about "his decline from the position taken in his first garrison order...To that of a slave to alcohol in 1812."

The garrison first learned of the fall of Fort Dearborn on August 26, when Corporal Walter Jordan returned after escaping the massacre. On August 28 local trader Stephen Johnston was killed approximately a mile from the fort. This news created disquiet in the garrison, and Indian agent John Johnston sent Shawnee Captain Logan to help evacuate the local women and children to Ohio, 20 miles to the east.

In early September warriors from the Potawatomi and Miami nations led by Chief Winamac and Chief Five Medals gathered around Fort Wayne, which was garrisoned by approximately 70 soldiers and some civilians. Rhea sent letters to John Johnston and Ohio Governor Return Meigs to ask for assistance. On several occasions, Rhea invited Indian delegates into the fort to discuss peace terms. Historian Milo M. Quafie maintains news of the siege had been relayed “to Picqua, Ohio by Stephen Ruddle, whence his message was conveyed to Harrison".

== Siege ==
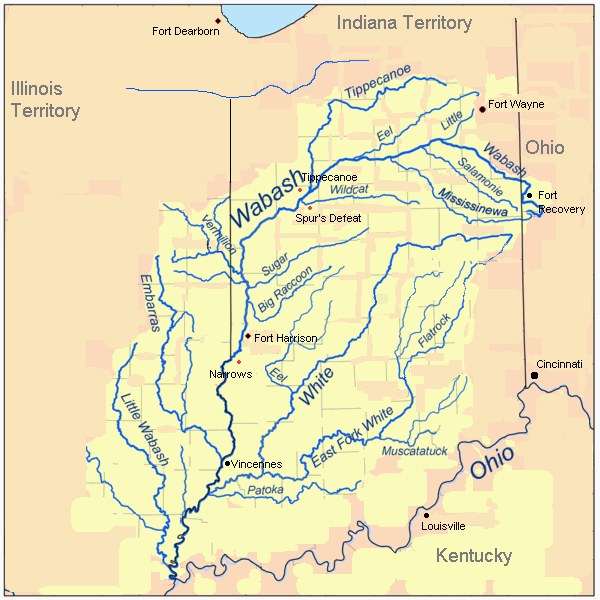
A map highlighting the location of the various Indiana forts.

=== Siege ===
On September 3, Potawatomi and Miami chiefs including Winamac approached the fort holding a flag of truce. Fort Wayne's fate seemed clear given the losses of nearby forts Mackinaw, Detroit, and Chicago. Lieutenant Daniel Curtis replied to Winamac by inviting him into the fort, and the two drank three glasses of wine together. Curtis then rose from his seat and in a pled with Winamac:

My good friend, I love you; I will fight for you; I will die by your side. You must save me!

He then gave Winamac a half-dollar as a sign of friendship and invited him for breakfast. Winamac did not attend the breakfast, but instead sent a band of five warriors who initiated the siege on the morning of September 5, 1812, after attacking two soldiers returning from an outhouse. Both soldiers died of their wounds by the afternoon. The Native Americans assaulted the fort from the east side and burned the homes of the surrounding village. They also constructed two wooden cannons with the intention of convincing the U.S. garrison that the British had arrived with artillery. In the lead up to the siege Rhea was said to be:

Drunk as a fool, and perfectly incapable of exercising rationality on any subject whatsoever, but was constantly abusing and ill treating everyone that came in his presence.

Due to his incompetence and resulting disorder Rhea was described by some of his colleagues as being the "greatest danger" of the siege and his officers considered placing him under arrest. A drunken Rhea occasionally suggested surrender before retreating to his quarters on the grounds that he was ill and being relieved. Benjamin Stickney, the fort's Indian Agent, took command of the fort along with Lt. Curtis and Lt. Phillip Ostrander. The Native American forces assaulted the fort twice before withdrawing to await a British force that was bringing light artillery.

That evening, Winamac approached the fort with 13 of his men to parley and was admitted. As the leaders talked, Winamac revealed a knife that he had hidden, and after a failed attempt on Stickney's life, Winamac was removed from the fort. Soon after, the Native American forces resumed their assaults on the fort. Winamac's forces tried to set the fort on fire. The garrison returned fire with muskets and howitzers while working to prevent the fires. The battle lasted until around 3:00 p.m. on September 6, when the Native American forces retreated to a safe distance from the fort. The fighting resumed around 9:00 p.m. that night.

=== Relief ===
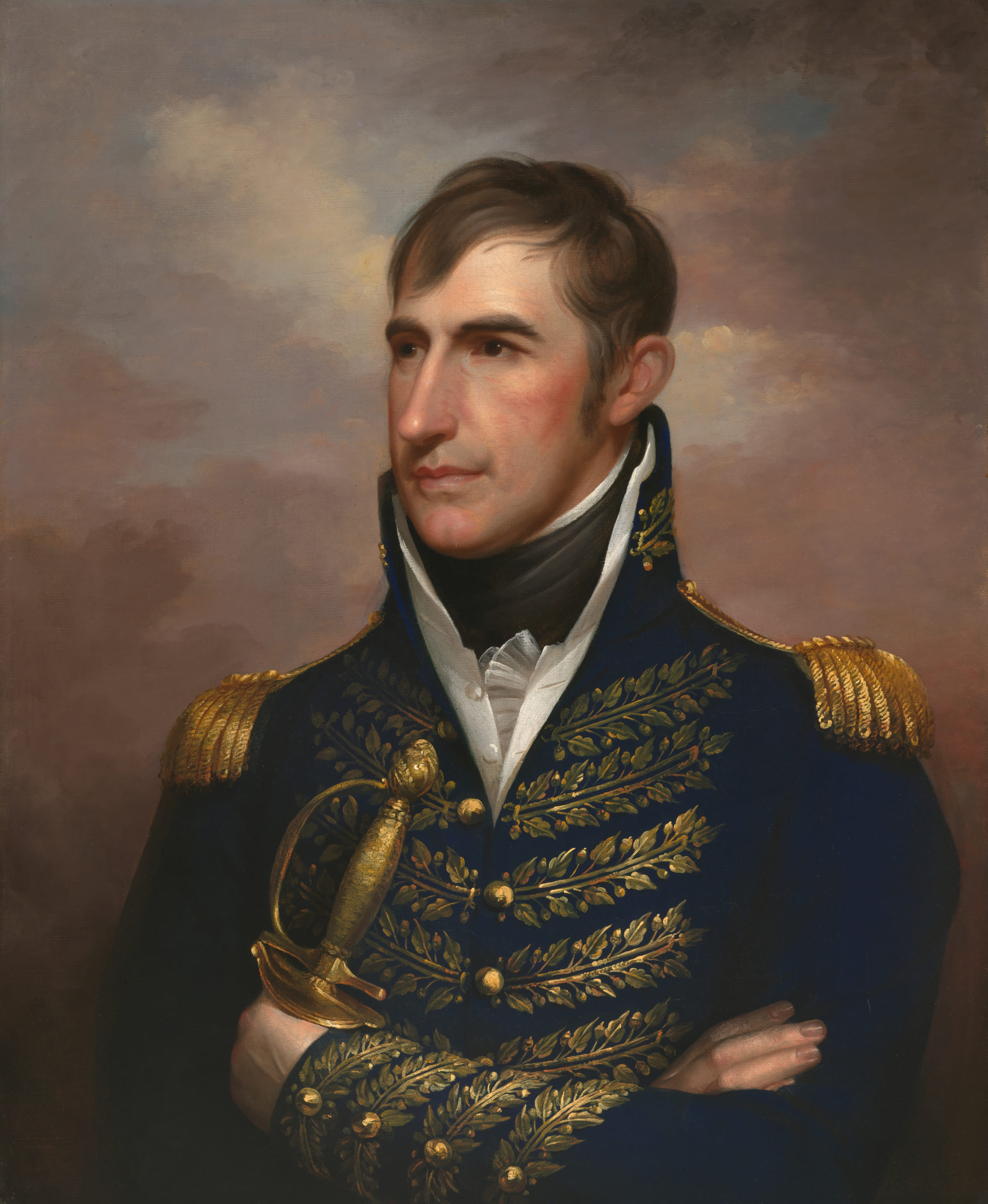
Territorial Governor William Henry Harrison led the relief effort to Fort Wayne.

Efforts were underway to reinforce Fort Wayne after news of the loss of Fort Michilimackinac, Fort Dearborn, and Fort Detroit reached Newport Barracks. General James Winchester was commander of the Northwestern Army, but Kentucky Governor Charles Scott had recently appointed Indiana Territory Governor William Henry Harrison as Major General of the Kentucky Militia and authorized him to relieve Fort Wayne. Harrison was at Newport Barracks to assume command of the militia. Harrison wrote a letter to Secretary of War William Eustis explaining the situation and apologizing for taking unauthorized action before quickly organizing a militia force of 2,200 men and marching north to the fort. A small scouting party led by Fort Wayne settler William Oliver and Ohio Shawnee Captain Logan arrived at Fort Wayne during a lull in the fighting, eluding Winamac's army and entering the fort. They delivered the news that relief was approaching, and again rode through Winamac's siege to report to Harrison that the fort remained under U.S. control.

Harrison also received a report that a force of 400 Native Americans and 140 British regulars under Tecumseh were marching toward Fort Wayne. Harrison raced to arrive at Fort Wayne before Tecumseh and the British. By September 8, Harrison's force had reached the village of Simon Girty on the St. Marys River, where they were joined by 800 men of the Ohio militia under Colonel Adams and Colonel Hawkins at Shane's Crossing.

On September 11, Winamac launched a final, unsuccessful attack on Fort Wayne. Winamac broke off the attack on September 12 his forces crossed the Maumee River and disappeared into the woods. Harrison's relief army arrived later that day without incident. The Native American and British force retreated into Ohio and Michigan Territory.

After the British had successfully captured the city of Detroit, they had received the news that American Indians had surrounded an American Fort. General Isaac Brock learned that a temporary armistice had been made in the east, and ordered Colonel Henry Procter to cease support for the attack on Fort Wayne.

== Aftermath ==
The siege of Fort Wayne prompted Harrison to order punitive expeditions against nearby Native American villages. He sent a detachment of the 17th Infantry Regiment and mounted rifles under Colonel Samuel Wells against the Potawatomi villages of Five Medals, and another detachment of two Kentucky regiments under Brigadier General John Payne against Miami villages at the forks of the Wabash. The punitive expeditions culminated in the Battle of the Mississinewa in December 1812. Influential Miami Chief Pacanne had remained neutral but following American retaliation for the Fort Dearborn Massacre, Pacanne openly aligned with the British.

The unsuccessful attempts to take Fort Harrison and Fort Wayne, as well as the reprisals by Harrison, caused many Native Americans to lose confidence. Many of them turned instead to the influential leadership of Tecumseh and joined his confederacy. No major Indian attacks occurred in the Indiana Territory for the rest of the war, but it was not until Tecumseh's defeat at the Battle of the Thames that the Native American pressure on settlers waned.

On September 18, 1812, while the detachments were away attacking villages, General Winchester arrived at Fort Wayne. Harrison relinquished command and later received orders from Secretary Eustis to regain control of Michigan Territory. Harrison's successes built his reputation, and he soon replaced Winchester as commander of the Army of the Northwest. He planned to use Fort Wayne as one staging ground in an attempt to retake Fort Detroit, leading to the Battle of Frenchtown four months later.

Three active battalions of the current 3rd Infantry (1-3 Infantry, 2-3 Infantry and 4-3 Infantry) continue the lineage of the old 1st Infantry Regiment, which had a detachment at Fort Wayne. Following the destruction of the Council house during the siege, the building was reconstructed on the same site in 1816.

== See also ==
- List of battles fought in Indiana
- Indiana Territory in the War of 1812

== Sources ==
- Allison, Harold (1986). The Tragic Saga of the Indiana Indians. Turner Publishing Company, Paducah. ISBN 0-938021-07-9.
- Edmunds, R.D (1988). The Potawatomis: Keepers of the Fire. University of Oklahoma Press. ISBN 0-8061-2069-X.
- Gilpin, Alec R (1958). The War of 1812 in the Old Northwest. East Lansing: Michigan State University Press. ISBN 1611860385.
- Poinsatte, Charles (1976). Outpost in the Wilderness: Fort Wayne, 1706–1828. Allen County, Fort Wayne Historical Society.
- Skaggs, David Curtis (2014). William Henry Harrison and the Conquest of the Ohio Country: Frontier Fighting in the War of 1812. Baltimore: Johns Hopkins University Press. ISBN 978-1-4214-0546-9.
