= Topinabee =

Topinabee or Topenebee may refer to:

== People ==
- Topinabee (I), the elder, a Potawatomi chief
- Topinabee (II), the younger, a Potawatomi chief

== Places ==
- Topinabee, Michigan, an unincorporated community

== Other ==
- USS Topenebee, a U.S. Navy ship
