= Winamac =

Name of several leaders and warriors of the Potawatomi Native American people

Winamac was the name of a number of Potawatomi leaders and warriors beginning in the late 17th century. The name derives from a man named Wilamet, a Native American from an eastern tribe who in 1681 was appointed to serve as a liaison between New France and the natives of the Lake Michigan region. Wilamet was adopted by the Potawatomis, and his name, which meant "Catfish" in his native Eastern Algonquian language, was soon transformed into "Winamac", which means the same thing in the Potawatomi language. The Potawatomi version of the name has been spelled in a variety of ways, including Winnemac, Winamek, and Winnemeg.

The Winamac name became associated with prominent members of the Fish clan of the Potawatomi tribe. In 1701, Winamac or Wilamet was a chief of the Potawatomi villages along the St. Joseph River in what is now the U.S. state of Michigan. This man or another of the same name was an ally of New France who helped negotiate an end to the Fox Wars in the 1730s. Two other Winamacs were prominent during the War of 1812. One was active opponent of the United States, while the other was a U.S. ally. These two Winamacs have often been confused with each other.

== Wilamet ==
In 1681, a group of Native Americans from several Algonquian tribes of New England accompanied French explorer René-Robert Cavelier, Sieur de La Salle on an expedition to the west. One of these Natives, Wilamet (or Ouilamette or Wilamek), was appointed by La Salle to serve as a liaison between New France and the natives of the Lake Michigan region. Wilamet was adopted by the Potawatomis, and his name, which meant "Catfish" in his native Eastern Algonquian language, was eventually transformed into "Winamac", which means the same thing in the Potawatomi language. Before long, he was recognized by the French as the "chief" of the Potawatomi villages along the St. Joseph River in what is now the U.S. state of Michigan.

Wilamet was therefore not a traditional Potawatomi leader (or okama), but was instead a "chief" appointed by the French. French-appointed chiefs were a common feature of the Franco-Indian alliance. According to historian Richard White, "as the French singled out certain leaders to be the channels by which French power entered the villages, they created a new kind of chief which can best be distinguished as an alliance chief".

Wilamet helped La Salle promote French policies while countering Iroquois influence in the Lake Michigan region. In 1694, a man named Ouilamek, probably the same Wilamet, led 30 Potawatomis in an expedition under Cadillac against the Iroquois. In 1701, Wilamet and Onanghisse (or Onangizes), another prominent Potawatomi alliance chief, represented the Potawatomis at the great Treaty of Montreal, which ended the war with the Iroquois.

During the Fox Wars (1712–1733), a Wilamek was a leader of the Fish clan of the St. Joseph Potawatomis. Historian David Edmunds portrays this man as the same one who had attended the 1701 treaty, although Richard White writes that a Wilamek of this era was of a man of Sauk and Meskwaki (Fox) parentage who had married into the Potawatomi tribe. In 1719, Wilamek traveled to Montreal with a group of Meskwaki leaders in an effort to make peace. The following year, his son was captured by the Meskwakis, but he was later released.

== War of 1812 era ==
During the War of 1812 era, the Potawatomis, like other tribes, were divided over whether to oppose the expansion of the United States or to seek peaceful accommodation. Two men named Winamac were prominent in this era. One was an active opponent of the United States, while the other became a U.S. ally. These two men have often been confused with each other. American historians have often distinguished them by referring to the "anti-American" or "hostile" Winamek and the "pro-American" or "friendly" Winamek.

=== Anti-American Winamac ===
The "anti-American" Winamac was a Potawatomi leader who first appears in the historical record in 1810. That year, while returning from an unsuccessful raid against the Osages, Winamac's party stole horses from some white Illinois settlers. The settlers pursued the raiders, and the Potawatomis attacked, killing four men. Governor Ninian Edwards demanded that the Potawatomis surrender the raiders, but chief Gomo informed U.S. officials that the raiders had gone to Prophetstown in Indiana, headquarters of the anti-American resistance movement led by the Shawnee Prophet and his brother Tecumseh. Along with chiefs Shabbona and Waubonsie, Winamac led the Potawatomi contingent against the Americans at the Battle of Tippecanoe at Prophetstown in 1811.

Winamac began the organization for the 1812 siege of Fort Wayne. Late in August, Winamac called together a war party from northern Indiana and Michigan. First attempting to convince Captain Rhea of their friendly intent, they sought entry to the post. Rebuffed, on August 28, 1812, the warriors killed a clerk who left the post for the Ohio. What followed were occasional firing of outbuildings and shots aimed at any and all movement seen from the outside. On September 4, Winamac approached under a flag of truce. Making no offer, Winamac found the fort susceptible to attack. The next day, two soldiers were killed outside the fort. Late in the afternoon, Winamac approached the fort with a small delegation and sought admittance to see the commander. Inside, they were heavily guarded, ending their ploy to kill the commander and attack from inside. The following day, September 6, saw the greatest action in the siege, but without help, the fort could not be taken. On September 11, a relief column under Governor Harrison arrived from Piqua and the siege ended.

After the siege of Fort Wayne, Winamac served as a scout under British Indian agent Matthew Elliott. On November 22, 1812, Winamac was with a scouting party that captured several Indians, including Shawnee chief Logan (Spemica Lawba), a U.S. ally. Winamac was killed in an exchange of gunfire when Logan and his companions escaped; Logan died later from his wounds.

=== Pro-American Winamac ===
The "pro-American" Winamek was a chief from the Tippecanoe Potawatomi on the Wabash. Beginning in 1807 he and Five Medals and Topinabee continued to ask the American government for agricultural help. The equipment was sent but never used, as only these chiefs were interested in agriculture, not their people. Previous attempts at farming the land south of Fort Wayne were also made in the early spring of 1805 by Chief Little Turtle, who welcomed two visiting Quakers that came upon the area at Little Turtle's request for their instruction, knowing their farming methods were sufficient. However, as would occur in 1807, although equipped with the proper methods and lands, these efforts would soon prove futile as the native people were apathetic towards the agricultural mission, with their focus remaining largely on local affairs and settlement conflicts. In 1807, President Monroe wanted to acquire more Indian land. A council was called at Fort Wayne in September. Winamac led the Potawatomi delegation. When the other chiefs and the Miami refused to negotiate land cessions, it was Winamac who persuaded first the Miami and then the Potawatomi to agree to the cession. When 3 million acres (12,000 km^{2}) were agreed to, none were lands of the Potawatomi. Winamac and the Potawatomi received a generous share of the payment for these lands. The months following the treaty found Winamac at Detroit settling disputes for the lands in northwest Ohio. Because of the Fort Wayne Treaty, discontent was growing and the number of warriors at Prophetstown was increasing. Winamac provided information to Governor Harrison on the plans and activities at Prophetstown. Harrison invited the Prophet to Washington and in June, Tecumseh led a delegation to Vincennes to meet with Harrison. Here, Tecumseh denounced Winamac as a 'black dog' for supporting the American interests.

Through the winter of 1811–1812, Potawatomi raids were launched against settlements in southern Indiana and Illinois. To end the destruction, councils were held at Cahokia and Vincennes. Winamac and Five Medals assured the agents that the few anti-American warriors were not representative of the Potawatomi. Because of the influence of the pro-British chiefs, Winamac and Five Medals refused a trip to Washington. Tecumseh the Shawnee spoke at the council blaming Winamac and Five Medals for not controlling their warriors. When Gov. Harrison marched north to Prophetstown on the Tippecanoe in November 1811, Winamac marched with him. When they were a short march from Prophetstown, Winamac went ahead to talk with the Prophet. Winamac returned south to meet Harrison, but was on the far side of the Wabash and passed him by. On the night of November 6, Gov. Harrison encamped for the night, planning on entering Prophetstown the next day. When the sun rose, the confederacy had surrounded the troops. The Potawatomi were led by Shabbona with Waubansee and Winamac (2nd another chief among the Potawatomi). The defeat of the Indian confederacy scattered the tribes to their home villages. The dispersal of the Indian confederacy did not end the raids among the settlements. Tension was so bad, even Winamac was warned to stay out of the settlements. His unfailing support of the Americans would not protect him from harm.

When the war between the United States and England was known, Winamac continued to support the Americans and led a delegation to the Lake Peoria villages seeking the warriors accused of raiding the settlements. He was ridiculed by the Potawatomi warriors and left unsuccessful. It was Winamac who carried William Hulls orders from Detroit to Fort Dearborn (Chicago) to evacuate, an attack was eminent. Winamac told Commander Heald that they must leave that day to save themselves, this was on August 9. On August 13, an escort of 13 Miami Indians arrived. On August 15, Mad Sturgeon and Blackbird led the Potawatomi ambush of 500+ warriors against the 62 soldiers and 27 civilians in the dunes of Lake Michigan. Fifty-three of the Americans died that day. Fifteen of the Indians died. Fort Dearborn fell on August 15, 1812, to an ambush, then Mackinac. These were followed by the siege of Detroit, which surrendered to the British on August 16. In September, Winamac, Five medals, and a force of Potawatomi/Miami attacked the northern Indiana garrison in the Siege of Fort Wayne.

In September 1817, Winamac and Metea represented the eastern Potawatomis at the treaty of Fort Meigs, in which they sold lands in Ohio and south central Michigan to the United States. Winamac died in 1821.

== Namesakes ==
- Winnemac (fictional state), a fictional state in the United States, invented by writer Sinclair Lewis.
- Win-E-Mac School District in northwestern Minnesota
- Winamac, Indiana
- Winamac Drive, Pocono Lake, Pennsylvania
- Winameg, Ohio
- Winnemac Avenue, Winnemac Park, and Winnemac Stadium in Chicago
