= O-gi-maw-kwe Mit-i-gwa-ki, Queen of the Woods =

1899 novel by Simon Pokagon

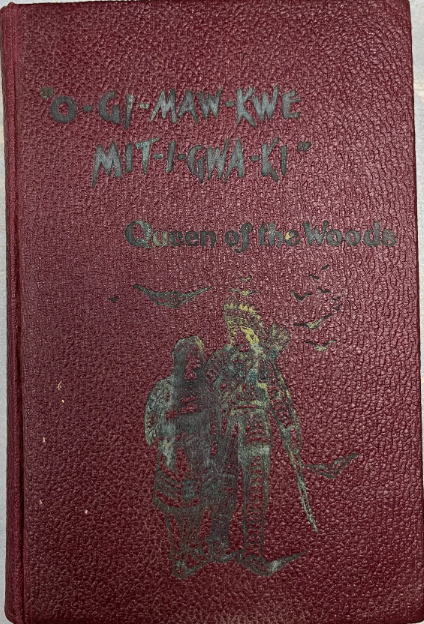
- Author: Simon Pokagon
- Language: English
- Genre: Novel
- Publication date: 1899

O-gi-maw-kwe Mit-i-gwa-ki (Queen of the Woods) is a novel by Simon Pokagon, published in 1899 shortly after his death. The novel was written as a testimony to Potawatomi traditions, stability, and continuity in a rapidly changing society. Today, Queen of the Woods is read as Simon Pokagon's desire to mark the cultural, political, and social landscapes of the time, as well as a memorial to the past and a monument to the future, in which he saw the Pokagon Band of Potawatomi Indians as a distinct and honored people.

== Summary ==
Queen of the Woods begins as Simon Pokagon returns from Twinsburg, Ohio, where he went to school for several years. During the course of his adventures, he meets up with his friend Bertrand and they go hunting and fishing together. They head north to an abandoned wigwam, where Pokagon makes a birch-bark canoe. Pokagon then returns home to find his beloved Lonidaw and they marry. Afterwards, they travel to Lonidaw's wigwam and construct a new one. He also keeps the birch canoe for fishing and gathering wild rice.

Years later, their son Olondaw leaves for school, but returns three years later and is an alcoholic. Soon afterwards, their daughter Hazeleye drowns when her canoe capsizes due to the reckless rowing of several drunk men in another canoe, exacerbating the tragedy of Olondaw's alcoholism. Lonidaw almost drowns trying to save Hazeleye and Pokagon is only able to carry Lonidaw, barely breathing, back to the wigwam. Lonidaw dies from grief as Pokagon watches the fireflies gather to guide his wife to her spirit home. As a result of these tragedies, and remembering his commitment to his wife to fight against alcohol for the rest of his life, Pokagon tries to carry on. He becomes very involved in the fight against alcoholism for the rest of his life.
