= William Wells (soldier) =

American and Miami military officer (1770–1812)

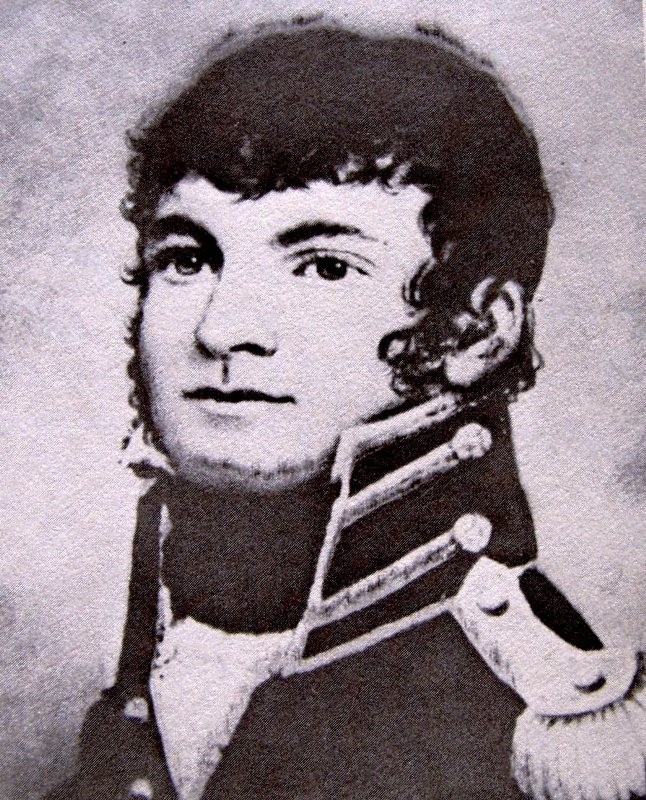
- Captain William Wells
- Born: William Wells; 1770; Jacobs Creek, Province of Pennsylvania, Thirteen Colonies
- Died: 1812 (aged 41–42); Fort Dearborn, Illinois Territory, United States (present-day Chicago, Illinois)
- Other name: Apekonit
- Spouse(s): unknown Wea woman Wanagapeth; Mary Geiger
- Children: 8
- Relatives: Little Turtle (father-in-law); Samuel Wells (father)
- Military career
- Allegiance: Miami; United States
- Branch: Legion of the United States; United States Army
- Rank: Captain
- Unit: Legion of the United States
- Conflicts: Northwest Indian War; St. Clair's Defeat; War of 1812; Battle of Fort Dearborn †

William Wells (c. 1770 – 15 August 1812), also known as Apekonit ("Carrot top"), was the son-in-law of Chief Little Turtle of the Miami. He fought for the Miami in the Northwest Indian War. During the course of that war, he became a United States Army officer, and also served in the War of 1812.

== Apekonit of the Miami ==
Wells was born at Jacobs Creek, Pennsylvania, in about 1770. He was the son of Samuel Wells, a captain in the Virginia militia during the American Revolutionary War. The family moved to Louisville, Kentucky, in 1779 and settled on Beargrass Creek when William was nine. Shortly after, his mother died. In 1782, a group of Miami warriors ambushed settlers who were evacuating Squire Boone's Station; Wells' father was killed in a second ambush the following day. Young Wells then went to live with the family of William Pope. Two years later, in 1784, he and three other boys were captured by an Eel River Miami and Delaware raiding party and taken to a location in what is now Indiana. Wells was 13 years old at the time.

Wells was adopted by a chief named Gaviahate ("Porcupine") and raised in the village of Kenapakomoko (Snakefish Town) on the Eel River, six miles north of present-day Logansport, Indiana. Wells' Miami name was "Apekonit" (carrot), possibly in reference to his red hair. He seems to have adapted well to Miami life and even accompanied war parties. He may also have been involved in decoying flatboats along the Ohio River.

Wells was located and visited by his brother Cary around 1788 or 1789. He visited his family in Louisville but remained with the Miami, perhaps because he had married a Wea woman and had a child. In 1791, his wife and daughter were captured in a raid by General James Wilkinson and taken to Cincinnati. Meanwhile, under the command of the great Miami war chief Little Turtle, Wells led a group of Miami sharpshooters at St. Clair's defeat in 1791, which marked Native Americans' biggest victory against the U. S. Army. The following year, Wells returned to Louisville. While in Louisville, his brother Sam encouraged him to travel to Cincinnati to meet with Rufus Putnam. Putnam then hired Wells to assist in negotiating a treaty with the Native Americans in Vincennes who were holding hostages. The negotiations ultimately led to the release of the captives. Putnam also hired Wells to spy on the confederated Indian councils in 1792 and 1793 along the Maumee River in northwest Ohio.

While his first wife was held captive in Cincinnati, Wells married Little Turtle's daughter Wanagapeth ("Sweet Breeze"), with whom he had four children. The children of Wells and Wanagapeth were Anne, wife of Dr. William Turner of Fort Wayne; Mary, wife of James Wolcott; Rebecca, wife of James Hackley of Fort Wayne; Jane Turner, wife of John H. Griggs; and William Wayne Wells, a graduate of the United States Military Academy at West Point.

On 11 September 1793, Wells arrived at Fort Jefferson with news of the Grand Council's failure, blaming Alexander McKee and Simon Girty for the outcome. He also delivered a dire warning that a force of over 1500 warriors was ready to attack Fort Jefferson and the Legion of the United States, then camped near Fort Washington.

Wells became the equivalent of a captain in the Legion of the United States, acting as an interpreter and the head of an elite group of spies. He agreed to obey the orders of "Mad Anthony" Wayne "as far as practicable." Wells led the First Sub-Legion to the battleground of St. Clair's Defeat (which he had fought in) and located several abandoned U.S. cannons that the Native Americans had buried. General Wayne ordered the Legion to bury the bones found and then build Fort Recovery on the battle site. Wells's scouts led the way when Wayne's legion marched toward the Maumee in the summer of 1794. When Native American forces under Blue Jacket attacked Fort Recovery on 30 June 1794, Wells warned of the danger. Afterward, he led a scouting mission that discovered British officers who had brought cannonballs and powder, not knowing that the United States had already recovered the buried cannons.

Wells was wounded a few days before the Battle of Fallen Timbers when, on a dare, he led his group of spies into a camp of 15 Delaware warriors and struck up a casual conversation. The spies fled when they were finally discovered, but Wells was shot in the hand and received fractures to his wrist. He still was able to give Wayne crucial advice about when to attack, which helped secure the victory. The following year, he was an interpreter for the Wabash group (Miami, Eel River, Wea, Piankeshaw, Kickapoo, and Kaskaskia) at the Treaty of Greenville, in which the Native American confederation ceded most of Ohio. As interpreter, he stood between his father-in-law Little Turtle, the only chief to vigorously resist the terms imposed, and Wayne, Wells's commander-in-chief. Little Turtle, the last to sign the treaty, requested that Wells be sent as an Indian agent to the Miami stronghold of Kekionga, now under American control and renamed Fort Wayne.

== William Wells, U.S. Indian Agent ==
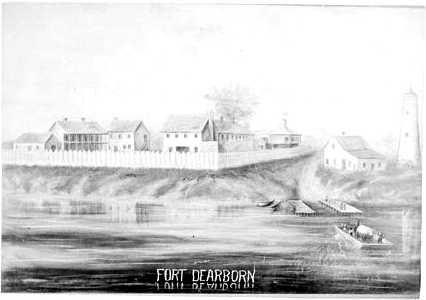
A sculpture on Chicago's Michigan Avenue Bridge shows William Wells fighting in the Battle of Fort Dearborn.

Following the Treaty of Greenville, Chief Little Turtle asked that Wells be appointed as a U.S. Indian Agent to the Miami. The U.S. built an agent's house in the newly renamed Fort Wayne, and William and Sweet Breeze, with their children, moved from Kentucky to resettle with the Miami. At the suggestion of General Wayne, Little Turtle and Wells traveled to Philadelphia to visit President George Washington. They were warmly received. Washington presented Little Turtle with a ceremonial sword, and Wells was given a monthly pension of $20 ($379.40 in 2025), in compensation for his wounds at Fallen Timbers. In 1797, the two traveled east again in to visit the new president, John Adams.

When Thomas Jefferson became the United States' third president, Wells requested that he establish a trading post at Fort Wayne to encourage friendly relations with the area natives. Jefferson established the post but appointed John Johnston as manager. Wells was expected to implement Jefferson's Native American policy, which called for "civilizing" the Native Americans while, at the same time, using treaties to gain as much of their land as quickly as possible. Johnston and Wells did not work well together, and each soon came to resent the other. At first, territorial Governor William Henry Harrison favored Wells and appointed him a Justice of the Peace. Wells was also charged with establishing a mail route between Fort Wayne and Fort Dearborn. However, Wells' good standing with Harrison soon soured when he sided with Little Turtle in opposition to the 1804 Treaty of Vincennes, which gave large amounts of land to the Americans for settlement. Harrison responded by accusing Wells of opposing the Quaker Agriculture missions to the Miami. Wells appealed to General James Wilkinson, but Wilkinson sided with Harrison and Johnston.

In 1805, Governor Harrison sent General John Gibson and Colonel Francis Vigo to investigate Wells and Little Turtle on suspicion of fiscal corruption and instigation of the Miami against the U.S. Their report concluded that Wells "seems more attentive to the Indians than the people of the United States."

After Sweet Breeze died in 1805, Wells sent his daughters to live with his brother, Samuel Wells, in Kentucky. Wells and Little Turtle traveled to Vincennes, where they gave a "friendly disposition ... toward the government," Harrison wrote. "With Captain Wells, I have had an explanation, and have agreed to a general amnesty and act of oblivion for the past." Wells and Little Turtle both signed Harrison's Treaty of Grouseland. However, in 1808, Wells led a group of Native American chiefs from different tribes, including Miami Chiefs Little Turtle and Jean Baptiste Richardville, to Washington, D.C., to meet directly with President Jefferson. This action infuriated Secretary of War Henry Dearborn, who dismissed Wells and replaced him with his rival, John Johnston.

In 1809, Wells married his third wife, Mary Geiger, the daughter of Colonel Frederick Geiger. Together, William and Mary would have three children: Samuel Geiger Wells, Yelberton Wells, and Julia Ann Wells. After the marriage, Wells, four of his children, and Geiger returned to Fort Wayne, where he received a discharge from the new U.S. Indian agent John Johnston. That autumn, the Treaty of Fort Wayne, a land deal, was signed, which led to a more militant stance on the part of Shawnee Chief Tecumseh and his brother. Wells warned the government about this new and dangerous development, but he was largely ignored in Washington, ultimately earning the hatred of Tecumseh and his followers.

Wells had the support of the Miami chiefs and Kentucky Senator John Pope and went to Washington to challenge Johnston's decision. Ultimately, Wells' position was left in the hands of territorial Governor William Henry Harrison who was distrustful of Wells but sided with the Miami out of fear that they could join Tecumseh if provoked. Wells continued to act as the United States Indian Agent in Fort Wayne and was able to keep the Miami out of Tecumseh's confederacy. He was the first to warn Henry Dearborn in 1807 of the growing movement led by Tecumseh and his brother. Wells' eldest brother, Samuel Wells, and his father-in-law, Frederick Geiger, were both at the Battle of Tippecanoe; Geiger was wounded in the initial attack.

Wells also established and managed a farm in Fort Wayne, which he jointly owned with his friend Jean François Hamtramck. He petitioned Congress for a 1,280-acre (5.2 km^{2}) tract of land at the confluence of the St. Joseph and St. Mary rivers in 1807, which was granted and signed by President Jefferson. (Note: See the bill reported on 26 November 1807. It was reported signed by the President of the United States on 18 March 1808.) Little Turtle died in his home in 1812 and was buried nearby.

=== Fort Dearborn ===
In 1812, the Madison administration failed to notify the frontier that the United States was about to declare war on Great Britain. As a result, the British and Native Americans knew several days before the Americans that hostilities had broken out. Hundreds of Potawatomi warriors surrounded Fort Dearborn (present-day Chicago) and demanded its surrender. Wells led a group of Miami from Fort Wayne, Indiana, to aid the evacuation of Fort Dearborn. Among the Americans under siege at Fort Dearborn was his niece Rebekah Wells, wife of the post commander Nathan Heald. Wells intended to offer protection to the garrison and their families – about 96 people, about a third of whom were women and children – as they abandoned the post and walked east to Fort Wayne. Negotiating with the Potawatomi, who surrounded the fort along the Chicago River, they were allowed to leave the fort. However, the destruction of whiskey and guns enraged the Potawatomi, who then attacked once they had marched south from the fort, a massacre known as the Battle of Fort Dearborn. Nathan and Rebekah Heald were both wounded, taken into captivity by the Potawatomi, and eventually ransomed to the British.

Wells, who was acting as a scout in advance of the party, knew the Potawatomi would attack and had painted his face black, which was not only a sign of bravery but also a sign to the Potawatomi that he knew their intentions and that he knew he was going to die. As the evacuated garrison walked down the beach, Wells rode in advance to keep an eye on the Potawatomi, and he was one of the first to fall when they attacked. The massacre took place in the dunes along Lake Michigan about a mile south of the Chicago River, in what is now downtown Chicago. Wells was shot and killed by the Potowatamis. Although his opponents considered him a traitor to their cause, they nonetheless sought to gain some of his courage by consuming his heart.

Wells had a will dated 1810 that instructed his wife Mary and five of his children to "share and share alike." Mary remarried in 1817 to Robert Turner in Louisville.

== Legacy ==
Plaque under Michigan Avenue bridge, Chicago

The following are named for William Wells:

- Wells Street in Chicago, Illinois
- Wells County, Indiana
- Wells Street in Fort Wayne, Indiana
