= The Red Man's Rebuke =

1893 booklet by Simon Pokagon

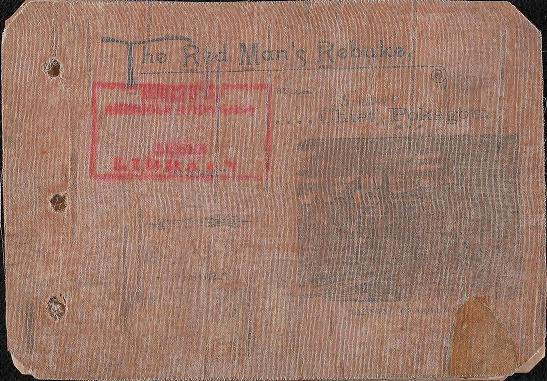
Original birch-bark cover of The Red Man's Rebuke by Simon Pokagon

The Red Man's Rebuke, later titled The Red Man's Greeting, was an essay written by Simon Pokagon (Potowatomi, c. 1830–1899) which he distributed to those attending the World's Columbian Exposition in 1893. It was published in the form of a sixteen-page, palm-sized birch bark booklet, of which an unknown number of copies were distributed. The Red Man’s Rebuke belonged to a series of acts of Native American cultural resistance which took place during the six-month-long exhibition.

The Red Man’s Rebuke was published by C. H. Engle in 1893. It includes a dedication to William Penn, Roger Williams, Helen Hunt Jackson, "and many others now in Heaven". Next comes Pokagon's explanation of the significance of birch bark and his purpose in using it. The booklet then proceeds to its title essay, ending with three captioned illustrations.

== Summary ==
Pokagon opens The Red Man's Rebuke by addressing the pale-faced race, or the White American population descended from the colonists, and the United States government, stating that the land upon which they live was stolen from Native Americans. He states that the very soil that the Columbian Exposition sits upon once belonged to the natives.

Pokagon describes a time before the colonists came, where natural resources were abundant and the land itself was virginal. In this pre-colonial era, the natives were free to marry, hold council, and especially, hunt. When the colonists came, the Natives took them under their care without question, but their demands for gold and resources could not be met, and so the colonists soon subjected them to violence.

In the next eight paragraphs, Pokagon describes how entire civilizations fell to the pale-faces, and how an old prophet had concluded that the natives would soon vanish forever. This paves the way for his chronological narrative of how the pale-faces brought disease and alcohol, both of which ravaged Native populations. He points out the hypocrisy of attitudes towards natives as "savage", as well as the sentiment expressed by the Chinese Exclusion Act. Pokagon argues that if Chinese immigrants are not to be allowed on American soil, then neither should Europeans.

Pokagon holds figures like William Penn, who did not violate the treaties that he had established with nineteen Native American tribes, as examples of the peaceful unity that could have been if only other European colonizers had held themselves to the same standard. He provides excerpts by both Peter Martyr and Christopher Columbus, who describe the Native Americans as morally pure, and peace-loving. He then provides a historical excerpt which recounts the Spaniards as having conquered the Natives with force, although the Natives had not given them any pretext for this.

Pokagon takes a brief intermission from this history to invite the reader to consider without bias the treachery enacted against Native Americans by European colonizers and the American government. He asks the reader to question its fairness.

The final section of The Red Man's Rebuke takes the form of a sermon, in which Pokagon calls upon the Almighty Spirit of humanity to rescue the Native population from the oppression of the pale-face, and to enact judgement upon those who were sympathetic and those who were not. He recounts, once again, the history of Native oppression and the destruction of the landscape, and says how when the last Native American dies, they will receive their justice in the afterlife. The kingdom of heaven will take two sides: the pale-faced spirits on the left, and the red spirits on the right.

Then, the Great Spirit in heaven speaks, first to the souls of the pale-faces on his left, stating that those who fought for all of mankind regardless of color will be granted the power to fly. The rest of the pale-faces, those who took advantage of the Natives, will not be granted entry into the kingdom, and will instead be kept from all of those who they sought to harm during their time on earth. In the final paragraph, the treacherous among the pale-faces are condemned by the red spirits out of paradise and into hell for all eternity.

== Background ==
The World's Columbian Exposition was held in Chicago from May 1 to October 30, 1893. It was the first major American fair, arranged to commemorate the 400th anniversary of Columbus' landfall in the western hemisphere. Among the agricultural, technological, and educational exhibits demonstrating North American progress since Columbus’ landfall were various village encampments and cultural artifacts produced by Native Americans, who were positioned among the exhibits to demonstrate human evolution. Pokagon was one among many who attempted to resist this patronizing of Native American culture, civilization, and people by handing out copies of The Red Man's Rebuke, intended both to attract attendants with its birch bark format while simultaneously delivering a message of Native American resilience to colonialism.

== Reception and criticism ==
The Red Man’s Rebuke is commonly cited in 19th-century Native American literature. It has found its way into discussions of Native American history, writing media, and American art. The text received little printing and there is not a great amount of scholarly discussion of it online. What scholarly discussion there is focuses on the use of birch bark in its creation and on Pokagon's attempt to mend a broken relationship between Americans and Native Americans.

Critical discourse uses birch bark as a foundation for a more nuanced argument involving multiple themes. As a physical characteristic, the birch bark medium is the first thing that readers and critics alike will notice. The booklet opens with a short explanation by Pokagon of why he published on birch bark, thus opening the way for scholars to question and argue for deeper reasons behind its use. Jonathan Berliner identifies the medium as a tool that advances Pokagon's agenda of cultural harmony. Berliner writes, "the material element of Pokagon's books can not be overlooked" and "Pokagon's materials … serves as a potential bridge between his words and the actions he wished his readers to take." Berliner believes the medium of birch bark to be essential for understanding Pokagon's beliefs.

Pokagon’s booklet has also received discussion on assimilation. Pokagon performed a cousin to The Red Man's Rebuke at the World's Columbian Exposition to spread awareness of the issues brought up in the booklet. The Chicago History Museum (which possesses an original copy of The Red Man's Rebuke) writes “[Pokagon's] speech … was calling for all races to assimilate and work together toward common aims.” Scholars have claimed that the booklet made similar points to Pokagon's speech. According to Zada Ballew, late 19th and early 20th century people in the Midwest began to look at the story of removal from the perspective of the Potawatomi tribe. This argument concludes that Pokagon intended to and succeeded in unifying American and Native Americans.

== Birch bark ==
The Red Man's Rebuke was printed in birch bark booklets. Each copy was unique with some lines being put on different pages. White birch was the tree of choice for Pokagon, who describes it as “this most remarkable tree”, because it was used in the everyday life of his tribe. Along with the birch bark, each booklet was bound with a ribbon.

Conservator Marieka Kaye embarked upon conserving a copy of The Red Man's Rebuke for educational purposes. In her view, the use of birch bark is still important to Native Americans, and she handled the project with extreme care. After much testing, Kaye was able to conserve the copy, contributing to help spread awareness of the text. In 2022, she published a paper that discusses the history, construction, and conservation of Pokagon's birch bark, including the chemical processes she experimented with in order to conserve the text.
