= Five Medals =

Leader of the Elkhart River Potawatom (1794–1818)

Five Medals (fl. 1794–1818; also recorded as Wonongaseah or Wannangsea, from the Potawatomi Wa-nyano-zhoneya, "Five-coin" or "Five-medal") was a leader of the Elkhart River Potawatomi. He led his people in defense of their homelands and was a proponent of agriculture. Five Medals first appeared in eastern records after the Battle of Fallen Timbers, but disappears from those records shortly after the end of the War of 1812.

== Peace on the frontier ==
In November 1794, not long after the Battle of Fallen Timbers (August 18, 1794), the Potawatomi turned to the Americans for an end to the War. Five Medals led a delegation to Fort Wayne and arranged to discuss peace at Greenville the following January. The armistice was concluded in January and a June peace council was arranged, also at Greenville. In 1796, the Americans were concerned over the continued contact between the Potawatomi along the St. Joseph River. To enhance their position, the American Indian Agents arranged to send a delegation of Potawatomi, Shawnee, Miami, Odawa (Ottawa) and Chippewa (Ojibwa), from Wabash to Philadelphia, the nation's capital. Five Medals was one of the two Potawatomi chiefs to go. Sailing from Detroit, they arrived in Philadelphia, where President Washington honored them with a banquet. Washington extolled the chiefs to honor the Greenville Treaty, which had been the result of a terrible war. He also called for all the tribes to take up agriculture. By 1800 Five Medals convinced Topinabee that the poor winter hunts since 1796 could only be corrected if the tribe adopted agricultural methods. Topinabee asked the Americans for assistance.

In December 1801, another delegation went east, this time to Washington, the new Capital. This delegation was led by Little Turtle of the Miami. Stopping in Baltimore, Five Medals addressed a convention of Quakers, asking for assistance in agriculture and in stopping the flow of whiskey. In Washington, Five Medals supported Little Turtle's call for annuity distribution at Fort Wayne instead of Detroit, which was more convenient to both nations. The villages further west than St. Joseph received little if any of the payment. Both leaders also joined Little Turtle's call for the suppression of the liquor trade. Whiskey was reaching the Potawatomi from the Wabash River trade. Governor Harrison moved to have the annuities paid at Fort Wayne, then called for a land cession council at Vincennes.

== Land cessions ==
Topinabee, Five Medals, Magaago, and Keesass came for the Potawatomi. The land in question was well south of Keesass' town, which was the furthest south of the Potawatomi villages. When the treaty was completed in June 1803, the Potawatomi agreed to it. In 1807, William Kirk, a Quaker missionary, and Five Medals met to arrange for an agricultural mission to his village. It never materialized. That year and the next four years, he, Winamac, and Topinabee continued to ask the American Government for agricultural help. The equipment that was sent was never used. William Kirk had been sent for the purpose of assisting the Indian people in learning to use these tools, but conflict with Little Turtle's son-in-law, William Wells, led Kirk to move to Wapakoneta, Ohio to assist the Shawnees. Eventually, Thomas Jefferson withdrew his support for the Quaker project. In September 1809, Governor Harrison met in council at Fort Wayne with the Winamac, Five Medals, and Keesass of the Potawatomi and the Miami chiefs. When the Miami refused to negotiate land cessions, the Potawatomi held firm to the Miami as allies, even as Winamac worked to convince the Miami to sell their land. Because of the proximity of American forts to Five Medals' village, he remained friendly with the Americans, as did Keesass. He was concerned with Tecumseh because of the trouble that would follow. In spite of repeated entreaties, Five Medals refused to listen to Tecumseh.

== War of 1812 ==
Through the winter of 1811–1812, Potawatomi raids were launched against settlements in southern Indiana and Illinois. To end the destruction, councils were called by the Americans to take place at Cahokia and Vincennes. Winamac and Five Medals assured the agents that the few anti-American warriors were not representative of the Potawatomi. Because of the influence of the pro-British chiefs, Winamac and Five Medals refused a trip to Washington. Tecumseh the Shawnee spoke at the council blaming Winamac and Five Medals for not controlling their warriors. In May, Tecumseh called an all-Indian council at Mississinewa. Here Five Medals realized that he no longer had control of his warriors. He hurried to Fort Wayne to warn the commander there. Here he learned that a family from his village had been attacked on their return from a trade visit to Kentucky. While the government obtained the family members taken prisoner and made presents for the two warriors killed, this only increased the hostility of the warriors against Five Medals. When Tecumseh and the Prophet moved to Prophetstown on the Tippecanoe, many of the Potawatomi warriors moved with them.

In August 1812, the Potawatomi supported the British at the siege of Detroit, which resulted in the surrender of the Post to the British. Immediately, the Potawatomi laid siege to Fort Wayne. Five Medals was forced to support. Governor Harrison started troops up the Wabash River to relieve the siege, which was accomplished on September 12. In retaliation for the siege, Harrison sent two detachments to raid the Potawatomi villages in northern Indiana while his troops continued to Detroit. Major Samuel Wells led one detachment to the Elkhart where Five Medals' villages were located; because they were vacant only the crops and buildings were destroyed. After the destruction of the village on the Elkhart River, Five Medals' people moved nearer to Detroit on the Huron River.

Many Potawatomi continued with Tecumseh in support of the British and were defeated at the Battle of the Thames (October 5, 1813). When the American Brigadier General Duncan McArthur extended a truce to the nations of the lower lakes, Governor Harrison at first refused to let the Potawatomi join. He relented to insure peace on the frontier and Topinabee, Five Medals and Main Poc signed for the Potawatomi. It was Topinabee, Five Medals, and Metea, who attended the Greenville council in July 1814, which sought to end the hostilities. The other chiefs stayed away. On September 8, 1815, a treaty of peace was signed between the Americans and Topinabee, Chebass, Five Medals, Metea, and Mad Sturgeon. In 1815, with the treaty ending the war, Shabbona and Senachewine were supported by the Indian Agent at Peoria as the tribal leaders against the Fort Wayne Agents selection of Five Medals and Metea and the Chicago Indian Agents support of Topinabee and Chebass. The confusion caused by these separate designations of tribal leaders began confusion among the Americans who sought to designate a single chief.

In 1818 the Treaty of St. Mary's ceded 1,550 acres (6.3 km^{2}) of Potawatomi land in western Indiana (Wabash River west) and in eastern Illinois. Many individual bribes were given to the chiefs of all the participating nations. Topinabee, Five Medals, Chebass, Moran, and Mad Sturgeon all signed the treaty.
