= Rhea (surname) =

Rhea is a surname.

It is generally pronounced (/reɪ/; RAY), and is of Scottish origin.

Notable people with the name include:

== People ==
- Arnt O. Rhea (1852-1937), American politician
- Caroline Rhea (born 1964), stand-up comedian, television actress and host
- Hortense Rhéa (1844–1899), French actress
- James Rhea (1791–1812), American soldier
- John Rhea (1753–1832), United States Congressman
- John S. Rhea (1855–1924), U.S. Congressman from Kentucky
- Karen Rhea, American mathematics educator
- La Julia Rhea (1908–92), American opera singer
- Lady Rhea, a Wiccan high priestess
- Lois Rhea, American composer
- Russ Rhea (born 1962) American journalist
- Slater Rhea, American singer-songwriter; TV performer
- Timothy Rhea (born 1967), American conductor, and Director of Bands at Texas A&M University
- William F. Rhea (1858–1931), U.S. Congressman from Virginia
