= John Johnston (Indian agent) =

American politician

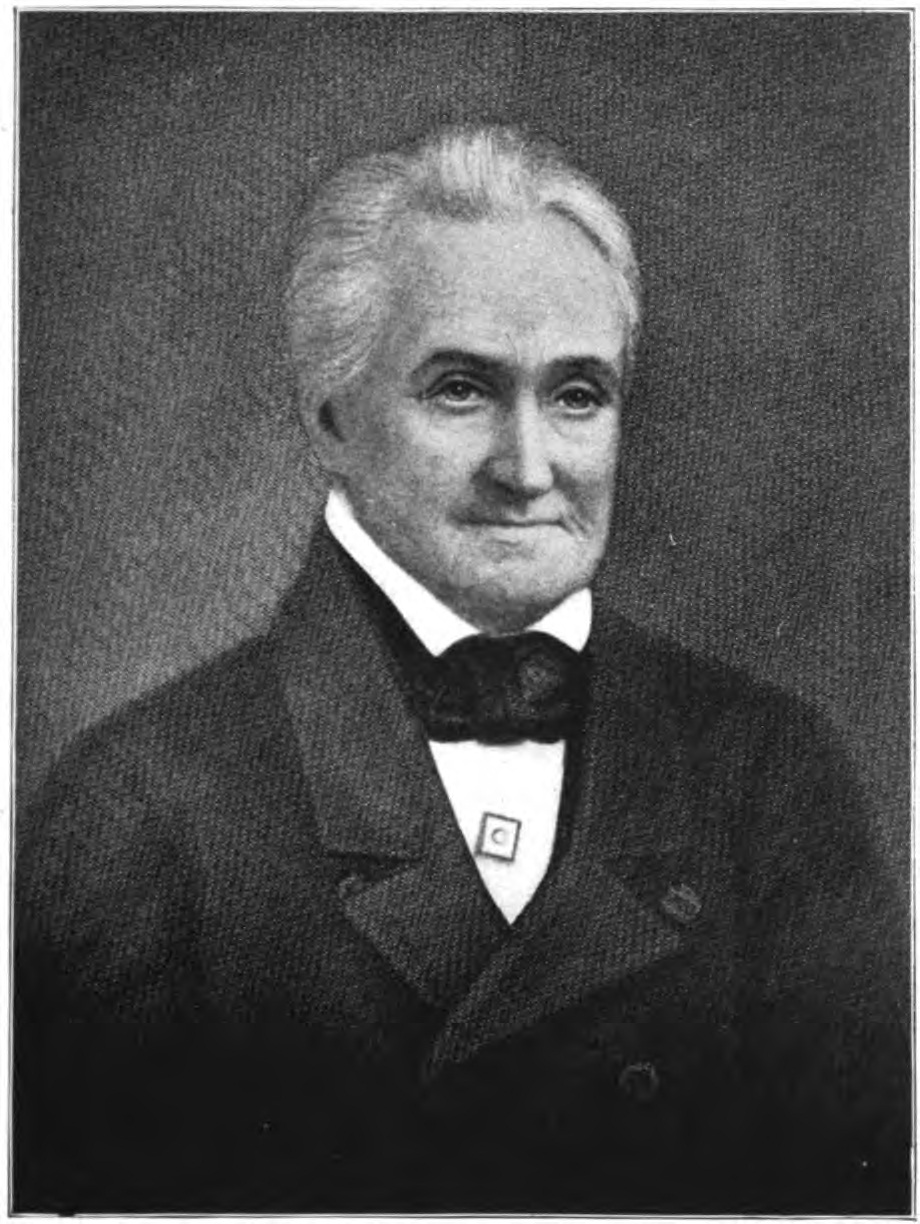

Personal details
- Born: 25 March 1775 Ballyshannon, Ireland
- Died: 18 February 1861 (aged 85) Washington, D.C.
- Resting place: Piqua, Ohio
- Spouse: Rachel Robinson
- Children: fifteen

Military service
- Allegiance: United States
- Battles/wars: Northwest Indian War; War of 1812

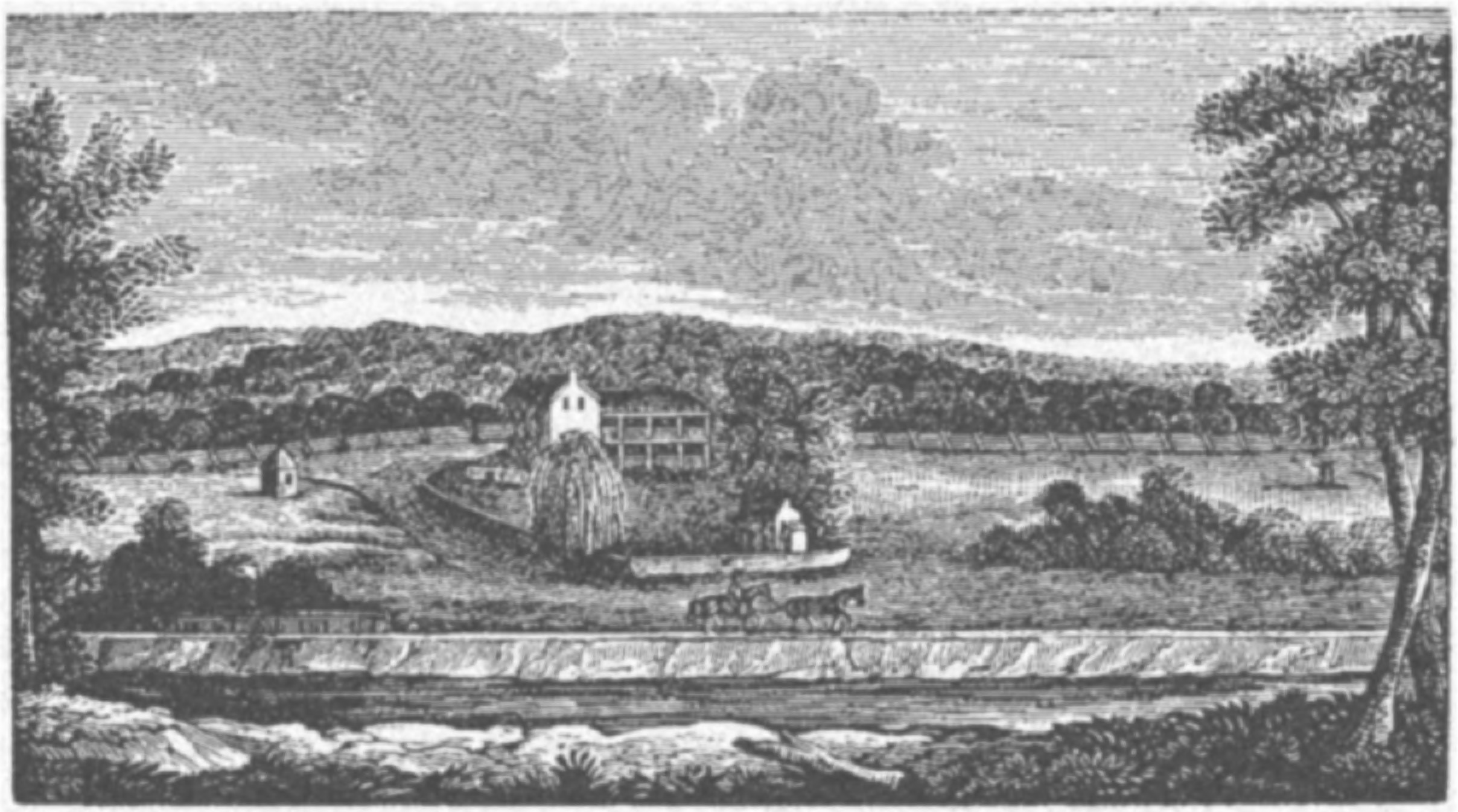
Home in Miami County

John Johnston (1775–1861) was an Indian agent in the United States Northwest Territory. He was born on 25 March 1775 near Ballyshannon in the north of Ireland. His father was Scottish and his mother was a Huguenot. He left Ireland when he was eleven years old, travelling to America with a priest and a trusted family friend who was also his tutor. When he emigrated to Pennsylvania in 1786, his father, mother, four brothers, and one sister remained in Ireland. They came to America five years after he settled here.

Johnston's career with Native Americans started as a wagoner for General Anthony Wayne's Legion of the United States. He returned to Pennsylvania after the campaign and worked as a law clerk. At age 27, Johnston met Rachel Robinson, who was 16. They eloped to Lancaster, Northwest Territory (it would become part of Ohio the next year) and were married on 15 July 1802. They had 15 children. 14 of their 15 children lived into adulthood.

In 1802, President Thomas Jefferson appointed Johnston as Indian Agent at the new trading agency in Fort Wayne, and by 1809 he was in charge of two Indian Agencies. His primary responsibility was to manage trade so that Indians in the area would not seek trade with the nearby British. Johnston was responsible to the territorial governor, William Henry Harrison, and to the Superintendent of Indian Trade. Almost immediately, however, a rivalry began between Johnston and William Wells, the official interpreter at Fort Wayne. The Miami of Fort Wayne trusted Wells, who had been adopted into their tribe, while U.S. government officials questioned Wells' loyalty and sided with Johnston. Johnston remained at Fort Wayne through a period of growing resentment between the American Indians and the United States, and filed a report summarizing Indian accounts of the Battle of Tippecanoe in 1811.

That same year, an Indian agency was established at Piqua, Ohio, and Johnston asked to be transferred to the new agency. He was at this agency during the War of 1812, and organized a Shawnee party under Captain Logan to rescue women and children during the Siege of Fort Wayne, where his brother, Stephen, was killed. He had much better relations with the local Shawnee and Wyandot than he had with the Indians at Fort Wayne, and served as Indian Agent until 1829. He helped negotiate the Treaty of Upper Sandusky in 1842, which removed the Wyandot from Ohio to the West. It was reported that he earned a $1200.00 salary per year as an agent, and he retained that position until let go by President Jackson - a total of thirty-one years.

Johnston was a Whig, and in 1844 was one of Ohio's delegates to the Whig Party's national convention. After the convention, he travelled to campaign for Henry Clay.

Besides his duties as an Indian agent, he also contributed to many other facets of Ohio. He was a canal commissioner with Ohio for eleven years, president of the historical and philosophical societies in Ohio, and founder of the first Sunday school in Miami County, Ohio. John Johnston was also founder of Kenyon College, served on the board of trustees of Miami University, and was a member of the board at West Point. He wrote Indian Tribes in Ohio before he died in 1861 in Washington, D.C. Today, his Piqua farm is maintained by the Ohio Historical Society.

John and Rachel Johnston were married for 38 years before his wife died on 24 July 1840, after eleven days of illness. The bereavement after the death of his wife in the family home, caused him to leave and move to Cincinnati with a daughter, and then later to Dayton, where he died in 1861 at the age of 86.
