= Fort Wayne (Indiana fort) =

Historic military stockade in Indiana, United States

Coordinates: 41°5′7.91″N 85°8′10.78″W

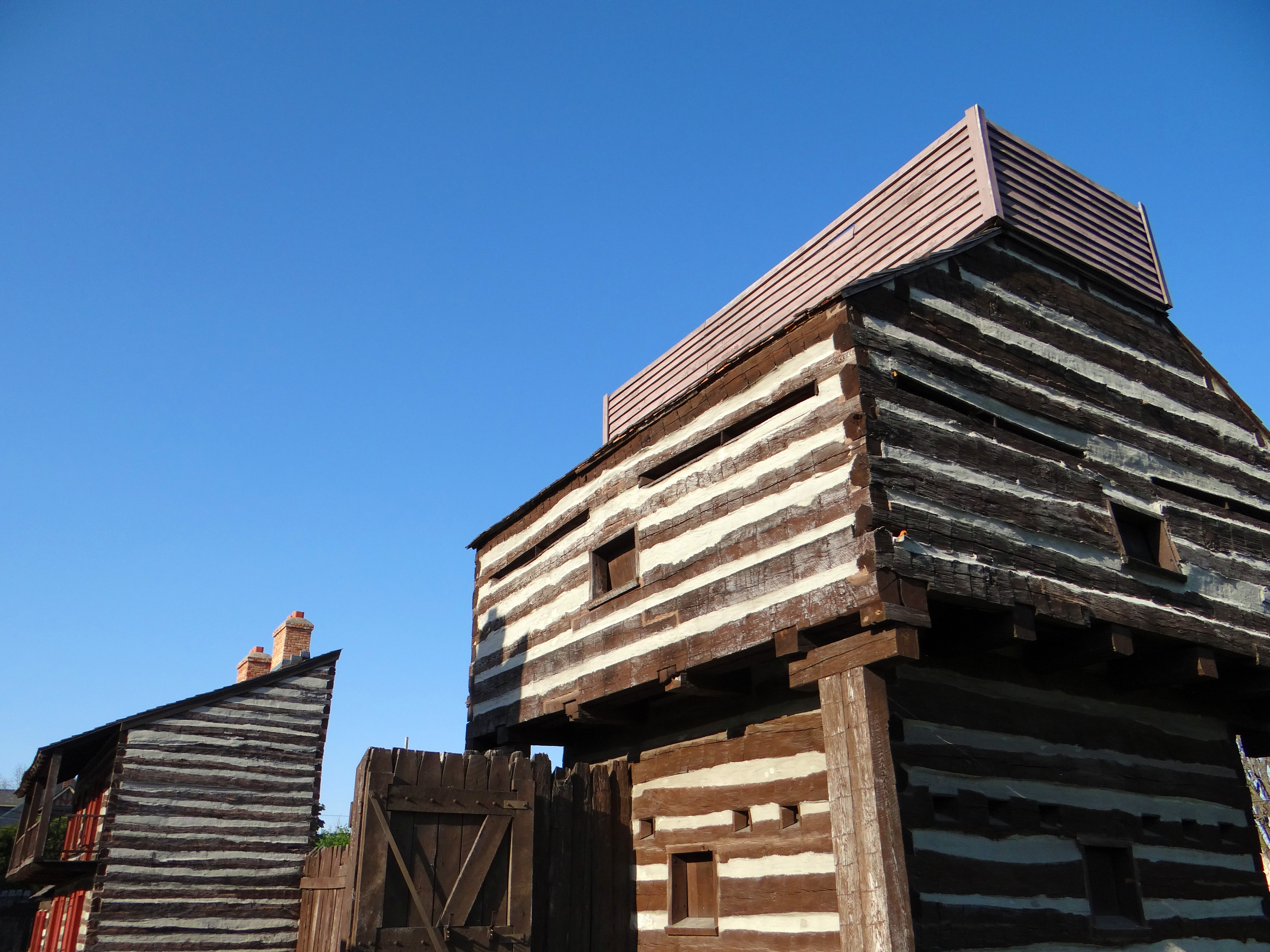
Historic Fort Wayne, seen here in 2014, is a recreation of the 1815 garrison.

Fort Wayne was a series of three successive military log stockades existing between 1794 and 1819 on the confluence between the St. Mary's and St. Joseph Rivers in northeastern Indiana, in what is now the city of Fort Wayne. The fort succeeded the original Fort Miami near Kekionga, the principal village of the Miami; The origins of which date back to the early 1700s.

The first fort with that name was built in 1794 by Captain Jean François Hamtramck under orders from General "Mad" Anthony Wayne as part of the campaign against the Miami during the Northwest Indian War. It was constructed to secure the territory gained in the Battle of Fallen Timbers, in which Wayne had recently been victorious. On October 22, 1794, with construction nearly complete, and in honor of the fourth anniversary of Harmar's Defeat, the fort was officially dedicated by the US Army in the early morning hours with fifteen cannon rounds to symbolize the fifteen states of the union. It was at this point that Colonel Hamtramck would name the fort, "Fort Wayne".

On September 5, 1812, the Siege of Fort Wayne occurred as part of the War of 1812. After the war, settlements started growing up around the fort. The fort was a basic stockade with few buildings. The original site was located near the present-day intersection of Berry and Clay streets.

In 1819, the fort was abandoned following the cessation of Native hostilities, and the modern city of Fort Wayne was platted in 1823. A replica of the fort as it existed in 1815 (called "The Old Fort") was created in a different location in the city, and is now a tourist attraction.

== Background ==
Fort Wayne was the successor to a series of French, and for a few short periods, British controlled forts named Fort Miami, which was originally built as a small trading post around 1706 by French Canadian soldier Jean Baptiste Bissot, Sieur de Vincennes.

== History ==
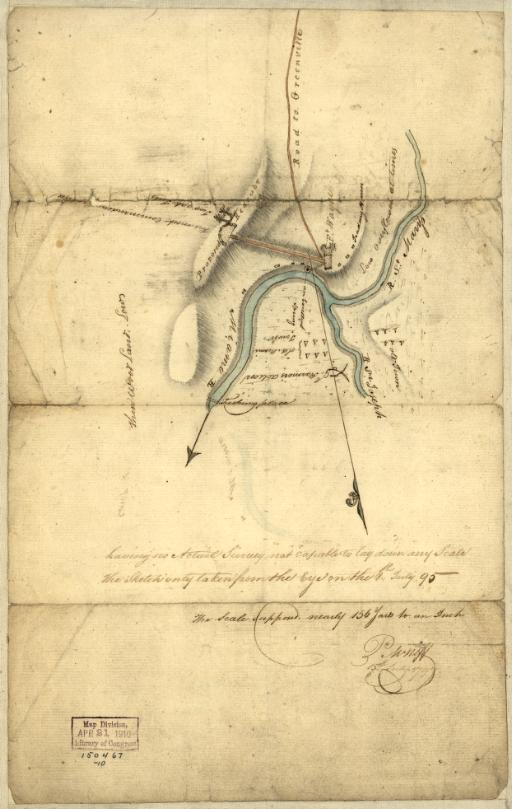
Map of Fort Wayne, circa 1795

Wayne's Legion arrived at Kekionga on 17 September 1794, and Wayne personally selected the site for the new U.S. fort. Wayne wanted a strong fort built, capable of withstanding not only an Indian uprising, but a possible attack by the British from Fort Detroit. The fort was finished by 17 October, and was capable of withstanding 24-pound cannons. It was named Fort Wayne and placed under command of Major Jean François Hamtramck, who had been commandant of Fort Knox in Vincennes. The fort was officially dedicated 22 October (the fourth anniversary of Harmar's Defeat), and the day is considered the founding of the modern city of Fort Wayne.

The garrison at Fort Wayne normally consisted of about 100 men and their families. In 1796, the garrison was ordered to march down the Maumee River to counteract a British demonstration. The force received the transfer of Fort Miami (Ohio) from the British before Colonel Hamtramck was transferred to Fort Detroit - later the site of another Fort Wayne, and near the future town of Hamtramck, Michigan. Colonel David Strong, a veteran of the American Revolution and Wayne's Legion, succeeded him as commandant of Fort Wayne for two years, before transferring commands with Colonel Hamtramck in 1798.

Colonel Thomas Hunt—a veteran of the Battles of Lexington and Concord, Bunker Hill, and Wayne's Legion—took command of the fort on 16 May 1798, and built a substantial new fort several hundred yards north of the original, near the modern city's Old Fort Park. The new fort contained multiple guard houses and Indian "factories" (trading posts). The first fort was demolished about 1800.

During the War of 1812, Fort Dearborn (present-day Chicago) was evacuated and its residents tried to reach Fort Wayne under the direction of William Wells, but were massacred before they arrived. Fort Wayne was besieged next by the Indian forces of Tecumseh during the Siege of Fort Wayne. Captain James Rhea, who had retreated to his quarters on the grounds of being ill, was in charge of the fort and considered surrendering, but his two lieutenants relieved him of duty. General William Henry Harrison arrived on September 12, 1812, and broke the siege. Captain Rhea was formally relieved of duty and one of the lieutenants, named Ostrander, was given official command of the fort. After the war, a town began growing around the fort.

A third fort was built in 1815/16 by Major John Whistler. The fort was officially abandoned on April 19, 1819, and its contents shipped to Fort Detroit. The last of the old fort was demolished in 1852 to make way in the town.

=== Early attempts at farming ===
In March 1805, at the behest of Chief Little Turtle, two Quakers came upon the area in response to Little Turtle's request for their consultation on local farming. On March 30, Little Turtle, William Wells, and the two Quakers embarked southwards of Fort Wayne to survey lands best suited for a farm. This region, known as the "Great Marsh", characterized the southern rim along Fort Wayne, and extended down to where Huntington, Indiana exists today. It was composed largely of marshlands, swamps, and sloughs. Its fertile conditions made it ideal for agriculture. However, despite the efforts of Little Turtle, and of several other chiefs at various points during this period in the early 19th century, the native people around Fort Wayne would remain generally aloof to farming these lands; Other more pressing affairs would take priority, such as increasing settler encroachment and land cessation resulting from a continuous series of land treaties being signed over by their profit-taking chiefs.

During the farming survey in March, the party of Little Turtle, Wells, and the Quakers passed through the heavily wooded and dense Little River valley, and to the "4-mile prairie" in between the St. Marys River and Little River; An area likely being where the historic portage was beaten. This site today is an unmarked industrial site. The group would eventually set upon an area 20 miles southwest of Fort Wayne along the Wabash River, where attempts were made to teach the natives on farming and tilling of the soil. Virtually none of the natives present at these teachings would remain committed, and Wells would be left to try and fulfill a farming contract to the natives involving farming equipment, which would never be met.

It would not be until the mid-early 1800s that farmers began making their way to this area of the Great Marsh. By the 1880s, almost all of these wetlands were drained and had been converted into farmland. Several byproducts of this drainage project exist today, such as the Junk Ditch and Fairfield Ditch. The Eagle Marsh preservation in Fort Wayne is one of the lasting remnants of these original marshland ecosystems.

== Commanders of Fort Wayne ==
Colonel John Hamtramck
Colonel David Strong	1796–1798	Transferred with Second American Regiment to Fort Lernoult
Colonel John Hamtramck	1798	Transferred back to Fort Lernoult. His son, John Francis Hamtramck, was born in Fort Wayne during this year, and is sometimes considered the first U.S. citizen born in Fort Wayne.
Colonel Thomas Hunt	1798–1802	Built new fort in 1800
Captain Thomas Pasteur	1802	Former commandant of Fort Knox and Fort Massac.
Colonel Henry Burbeck	1803	
Major Zebulon Pike	1803	Father of explorer.
Captain John Whipple	1803–1807	In command during Quaker Agriculture missions to the Miami.
Captain Nathan Heald	1807–1810	Married Rebeckah Wells, niece of William Wells. Transferred to Fort Dearborn (Illinois)
Captain James Rhea	1810–1812	Commander during the Siege of Fort Wayne
Lieutenant Ostrander	1812	Relieved Capt. Rhea of command during the Siege of Fort Wayne Later arrested by Capt Moore, and died 13 July 1813, while in captivity.
Captain Hugh Moore	1812–1813	
Major Joseph Jenkinson	1813	Assumed command after commanding flotilla of supply boats to Fort Wayne.
Major John Whistler	1814–1817	Was a British soldier at the Battles of Saratoga. Had been with Wayne's legion and helped build original Fort Wayne. Also built first Fort Dearborn, where he served as the first commandant. Built third Fort Wayne in 1815. Transferred to St. Louis.
Lieutenant Daniel Curtis	1817	Was at Siege of Fort Wayne. Served 3 months as temporary commandant.
Major Josiah N. Vose	1817–1819	Last commandant of Fort Wayne. Garrison abandoned fort 19 April 1819.
