= Wanagapeth =

Miami Native American woman, daughter of Little Turtle (died 1808)

Wanagapeth ("Sweet Breeze"), (died 1808) was the eldest daughter of Miami war chief Michikinikwa, known in English as Little Turtle. She married Apekonit, or William Wells.

William Wells was a white American who had been captured and adopted into the Miami tribe. He had a wife and child who were captured in 1791 and presumed dead. William took Wanagapeth as his second wife, forging a strong family bond between Wells and Turtle that would last until their deaths.

Wanagapeth and Wells had three daughters and one son. Their son, William Wayne Wells, or Wapemongah, graduated fourth in his class at West Point in 1821 and rose to the rank of 1st Lieutenant. He died in 1832 and had no children. One daughter, Ann, married but also had no children. Daughters Rebecca and Mary both have descendants living today.

Little Turtle biographer Harvey Lewis Carter estimates that Sweet Breeze died during the Winter of 1805–1806, because after that year her children moved to Kentucky to live with their uncle, Samuel Wells.

Wanagapeth's father, Mihšihkinaahkwa fought against the United States in the Northwest Indian War. A treaty stated that Americans would not disturb the land of the Native Americans, and the Native Americans would not disturb them if they did that. But American settlers failed to do this. The United States sent two campaigns against the Miami villages at Kekionga. The Native Americans celebrated a significant victory in 1790 and one of the largest Native American victories in U.S. history in 1791.

In 1794, Washington sent a new army, this time under General Anthony Wayne, a revolutionary war general. Wanagapeth's father, Michikinikwa, warned the Native American Confederacy to avoid a fight with Wayne. Her husband, William, joined the United States. In August 1794, Wayne's army defeated more than 1,000 Native Americans under Shawnee chief Weyapiersenwah (Blue Jacket) in The Battle of Fallen Timbers, near present-day Toledo, Ohio. This defeat for the Native Americans crushed their dreams for keeping their land. In the Treaty of Greenville (1795), Native American leaders agreed to surrender most of the land in what is now Ohio.
