= Quaker Agriculture missions to the Miami =

In 1802, during a trip to Washington, DC, Miami Chief Little Turtle extended an invitation to the Baltimore area Quakers to visit Fort Wayne and teach the Miami about white civilization and European cultivation methods. The Quakers sent farm implements in 1803. Little Turtle, by way of William Wells, sent a letter thanking them for the tools, but expressed uncertainty of how they should be used.

The Quakers sent two missionaries, a farmer, and a blacksmith, who arrived in Spring of 1804. Missionaries Gerard T. Hopkins and George Ellicott remained two weeks to see to the establishment of Philip Dennis, a Baltimore area farmer who would remain through Autumn to demonstrate the farming methods used by Americans on the East Coast. Their reception was small, as Little Turtle explained, because many were busy making seasonal maple sugar. However, they received a guided tour of the Miami territory, including the site of Harmar's Defeat and the migration of lake sturgeon up the Maumee River.

The Miami tribes set Dennis in a solitary area, near the present-day border of Wabash and Huntington counties in Indiana. At the time, it was closest to Little Turtle's village, but not near any towns. Dennis established his farm on what is today known as Dennis' Creek, a tributary of the Wabash River.

Members of the Miami, Potowatami, and Wea tribes all visited to watch Dennis farm during the Summer, but only one or two men showed enough interest to help Dennis establish the farm. After harvesting the crops and storing them for the Winter for his hosts, Dennis returned to his family in Baltimore, and later died on his farm in Montgomery County, Maryland. His report indicated that he had successful crops, and that the land was very fertile.

Despite the interest in his farming methods, the Miami did not adopt them. Anecdotal stories from the report to the Baltimore Friends indicate that the Miami already farmed adequately and were very apt hunters; they may have simply found their hunting methods more efficient than the Quaker farm.

The location of Dennis' farm became known as Dennis' Station or Little Turtle's Farm School, and it became a central location for the "civilization project." Government money was allocated towards the project, but William Wells argued that nothing permanent could be achieved unless someone could be appointed as manager.

Unfortunately, when Quakers William and Mahlon Kirk arrived in 1806, they got along poorly with the Miami leadership, and the project fell apart. William Kirk transferred his mission to the Shawnee at Wapakoneta, Ohio. William Wells was especially critical of Kirk, and accused him of lying to the Quakers and embezzling government funds. The government instead decided that Wells had interfered with Kirk's mission, which harmed US-Miami relations.

== Sources ==
- Anson, Bert. The Miami Indians. ©2000. University of Oklahoma Press. ISBN 0-8061-3197-7.
- Carter, Harvey Lewis. The Life and Times of Little Turtle ISBN 0-252-01318-2
- Hopkins, Gerard T. A Mission to the Indians
- Hopkins, Gerard T. A Quaker Pilgrimage 1804. Edited by Alene Godfrey, 1959
- Poinsatte, Charles (1976). Outpost in the Wilderness: Fort Wayne, 1706-1828. Allen County, Fort Wayne Historical Society.
- Thornbrough, Gayle, ed. (1961). Letter Book of the Indian Agency at Fort Wayne, 1809-1815. Indianapolis: Indiana Historical Society.
