= Captain Logan =

Shawnee warrior

- Spemica Lawba
- Born: Spemica Lawba (High Horn) c. 1776; Ohio Country, British America
- Died: November 25, 1812; Ohio, U.S.
- Cause of death: Killed in the War of 1812
- Burial place: Fort Winchester (Defiance, Ohio)
- Other names: James Logan, Logan
- Occupations: Trader, scout, warrior, interpreter

Captain Logan (c. 1776 – November 25, 1812), also known as Spemica Lawba ("High Horn"), James Logan, or simply Logan, was a Shawnee warrior who lived in present-day Ohio. Although he opposed the expansion of the United States into Shawnee lands, following the Treaty of Greenville in 1795, he became one of many Shawnees who sought to preserve Shawnee independence by maintaining peaceful relations with the United States. When the War of 1812 reached Ohio, Logan served as a scout and guide for the American military.

Logan was killed in a skirmish with British-allied Native Americans, and was buried with military honors by the Americans, making Logan "the foremost Indian hero on the American side" of the War of 1812.

== Early life ==
Logan was born Spemica Lawba ("High Horn") in the Ohio Country in or around 1776. His birth name has also been spelled "Spemicalawba," "Spamagelabe," and "Spemeaalapah." He belonged to the Mekoche division of the Shawnee tribe. As a young man, he was friends with Tecumseh, who would later become a renowned Shawnee leader. According to Logan's friend John Allen, Logan was of mixed-blood, and his Native mother was related to Tecumseh. Indian agent John Johnston, who also knew Logan, said Logan was not related by blood to Tecumseh. Some accounts stated that Logan's mother was Tecumseh's sister, which is incorrect, though the two women were possibly related. Logan's first cousin was the prominent Shawnee warrior Black Snake (Peteusha). In the 1840s, decades after Logan's death, an unverified story emerged that his father was a white man named Joshua Renick, who had been captured around 1761 and raised by Natives.

In 1786, when Spemica Lawba was a boy, he was captured in Logan's raid, in which Kentuckians led by Benjamin Logan had marched into the Ohio Country to attack Shawnee towns. Logan and other prisoners, including another boy, Peter Cornstalk (Wynepuechsika), were taken as hostages back to Kentucky. In August 1787, Shawnee chief Captain Johnny (Kekewepelethy) arranged for the release of the Shawnee hostages, using Daniel Boone as an intermediary. During his captivity, Spemica Lawba leaned to speak some English, and took the name "Logan" after Benjamin Logan, who had apparently befriended the boy.

== Adulthood ==
Logan fought against the United States in the ensuing Northwest Indian War between 1786 and 1795. After the war he lived near the Shawnee town of Wapakoneta, where he worked as a trader. He married a Shawnee woman named Rebecca and had four children. He was not a village chief but he attended the Wapakoneta councils as a war chief. In 1806, he served as an interpreter for Blue Jacket and Tecumseh when they traveled to Chillicothe, capital of the new U.S. state of Ohio, to reassure the governor that Shawnees posed no threat to American settlers.

=== War of 1812 ===
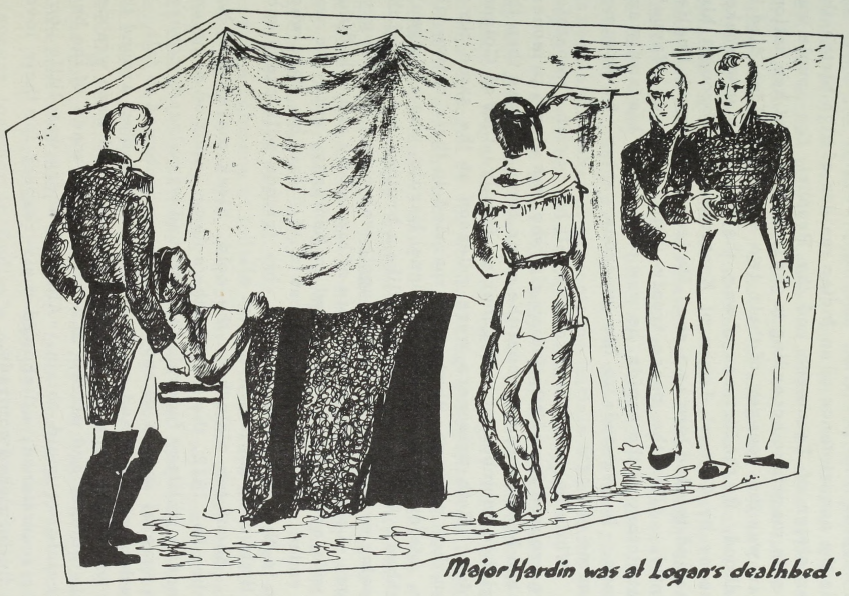
Captain Logan on his deathbed, with his friend Major Martin D. Hardin, depicted in a 1953 illustration

Although Tecumseh's band of Shawnees allied with the British during the War of 1812, most Shawnees did not. In June 1812, as the war approached, Logan served as a guide for American General William Hull as Hull marched his men through Ohio toward Detroit. In July 1812, Logan visited Fort Malden in Upper Canada in an unsuccessful attempt to convince Tecumseh to abandon the British alliance. Historian John Sugden described the meeting:

Tecumseh and James Logan were friends, both destined to end their lives in this war, fighting for different "Fathers" in whose causes they took no intrinsic interest. The two men spoke long into the night, arguing about where the best course for the Indians lay, but they could not agree. Logan felt that Tecumseh would be crushed with the British; Tecumseh that the confederacy and British alliance were the red men's only hope of saving their lands, culture, and independence. He told Logan that the Creeks were pledged to join him, and spoke of many other Indians who stood ready to fight. Still, sadly, they parted for the last time, committed to different but unsuccessful paths.

Thanks in no small part to Tecumseh's efforts, General Hull's expedition to Detroit ended with his surrender in August 1812, which left American outposts like Fort Wayne exposed to counterattack. Indian agent John Johnston, stationed in Piqua, Ohio, recruited Logan to go to Fort Wayne and bring twenty-five women and children back to Piqua. Johnston then hired Logan to serve as a guide and scout for a new American army, this time commanded by William Henry Harrison. In September 1812, Logan made another trip to Fort Wayne, passing through enemy lines. He reported back to the Americans that Fort Wayne was under siege, then guided Harrison's army to relieve the fort. Logan refused to participate in Harrison's punitive expeditions against nearby Native villages after the fort had been secured, though he continued to scout for Harrison's army.

In November 1812, Logan's party was scattered by a superior force while scouting near the rapids of the Maumee River. He escaped and reached the wing of the American army led by General James Winchester. There, some Americans expressed doubts about whether Logan and his Shawnee scouts could be trusted. On November 22, 1812, Logan sought to prove his reliability by leading another scouting mission back towards the rapids. Scouting on foot, he and two Shawnee companions, Captain Johnny and Bright Horn, were captured by a mounted party led by Winamac, a Potawatomi war chief. After being escorted for several miles, the men tried to escape, and gunfire was exchanged. Winamec was killed and Logan was hit in the abdomen. He returned to Winchester's camp, mortally wounded. He asked his friend Martin D. Hardin to make sure his children "were educated and raised as whites." After his death, his body was taken to Fort Winchester, where he was buried with military honors. General Winchester reported his death to Harrison, writing that "more firmness and consummate bravery has seldom appeared in the military theatre."

== Legacy ==
In honor of his service, the 1817 Treaty of Fort Meigs granted Captain Logan's surviving children 640 acres on the east side of the Auglaize River, in present-day Auglaize County, Ohio. In 1848, this area became Logan Township, named for Captain Logan. In 1828, Logansport, Indiana, was named for him.

Allan W. Eckert's 1983 novel Johnny Logan: Shawnee Spy is based on Spemica Lawba, although Eckert called his main character "Johnny." John Logan was the name of a different Shawnee who fought on the opposite side of the War of 1812. He was a young Shawnee interpreter who fought alongside Tecumseh, and was killed in the Battle of Brownstown on August 5, 1812. A member of Blue Jacket's band, he was not related to Captain Logan.
