= Leopold Pokagon =

Potawatomi leader

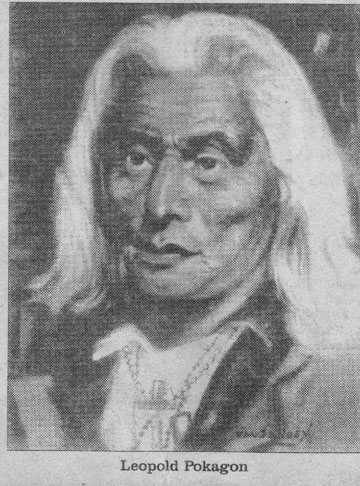
- Born: 1775; United States
- Died: 1841 (aged 65–66); United States
- Occupation: Native American chief
- Title: Chief
- Children: Simon Pokagon
- Relatives: Michael Jaguar-Paw Sharkey

Leopold Pokagon (c. 1775 – 1841) was a Potawatomi Wkema (leader). Taking over from Topinbee, who became the head of the Potawatomi of the Saint Joseph River Valley in Michigan, a band that later took his name.

== Early life and education ==
Pokagon's early life is surrounded by legend, and many details are known only in the oral histories of the tribe. Stories suggest that he was born an Odawa or Ojibwe, but was raised from a young age by the Potawatomi. His name, Pokagon, poké-igan, means "the rib," but literally means "something used to shield". As the ribs shield the heart, so too did Pokagon shield his people.

Pokagon converted to the Roman Catholic Church.

== Career ==
Pokagon emerged as a very successful tribal leader after 1825. In the last decade of his life, Pokagon sought to protect and promote the unique position of the Potawatomi communities living in the St. Joseph River Valley. He traveled to Detroit in July 1830, where he visited Father Gabriel Richard to request the services of a "black robe" (makatékonéya, literally "dressed in black," referring to the black robe (cassock) traditionally worn by priests). He believed that affiliation with the Catholic Church represented an important political alliance in the struggle to avoid removal. That same year, Pokagon and his wife Elizabeth were baptized by Father Frederick Rese, the vicar general of the Detroit Diocese, along with numerous fellow band members. In response to Pokagon's request for a priest to come administer to the Potawatomi, church authorities asked Father Stephen Badin, who was in Detroit visiting his brother, to accept the position. In August 1830, Badin arrived to establish a mission to serve the Pokagon Potawatomi. Badin employed a translator as he considered himself too old to learn the language. He unsuccessfully tried to found a school and an orphanage, and then in 1832 he purchased 524 acres of land around South Bend, half from the government and half from two landowners. He then built a log chapel to serve as chapel and residence, and later gave the land to the bishop on condition that an orphanage and school be built. In 1836, given his advanced age, Badin decided to leave his Indian mission to his successor, Father Louis Desaille. By converting to Catholicism, the Potawatomi of the St. Joseph River Valley affirmed a new identity as the Pokagon Band of Potawatomi. With the leadership of Pokagon and the help of Badin and other anti-removal Catholic missionaries, the Pokagon Potawatomi were able to avoid removal.

In 1833, Pokagon negotiated an amendment to the 1833 Treaty of Chicago that allowed Pokagon's Band to remain on the land of their ancestors in Michigan. Nearly all the rest of the Potawatomi were to be moved west of the Mississippi River by the federal government following the Indian Removal Act of 1830. By abstaining from alcohol at the treaty negotiations held in Chicago in 1833, and emphasizing his and his followers' conversion to Catholicism, Pokagon secured a special provision in the 1833 Treaty. Later the Pokagon Band removed to L'Arbre Croche (Waaganaakising, land of the crooked tree, literally where the crooked tree is). Pokagon ultimately used the monies paid pursuant to the Treaty to purchase lands for his people in Silver Creek Township, near Dowagiac, Michigan. He patented the land in his name and becoming a private land owner same as the surrounding settlers.

The Catholic Potawatomi throughout southwest Michigan and northwest Indiana acknowledged Pokagon as their leader. Ever since, the Indian villages from Hartford, Rush Lake, Dowagiac, Niles, Buchanan in Michigan and South Bend in Indiana have been united under a common identity, Pokégan Bodwéwadmik dbéndagwzéwad (Pokagon Potawatomies they belong to).

In 1841, Pokagon obtained the assistance of Associate Michigan Supreme Court Justice Epaphroditus Ransom to halt US military attempts to remove the Catholic Potawatomi in violation of the 1833 Treaty. After Pokagon's death on July 8, 1841, disputes between his heirs, the Potowatomi, and the Catholic Church over ownership of the Silver Creek lands resulted in legal battles that painfully disrupted the community. A majority of the residents living at Silver Creek moved to Brush Creek, Rush Lake and elsewhere in southwest Michigan and northwest Indiana. The Potowatomi worked to secure the annuities and other promises owed them under the terms of the many treaties they had signed with the United States.

Today, the tribe continues as the Pokagon Band of Potawatomi Indians, a federally recognized Indian Nation, with an excess of 4300 citizens and a ten-county service area in northwest Indiana and southwest Michigan. Tribal headquarters are located in Dowagiac, Michigan, with a satellite office in South Bend, Indiana. The Tribal Police force operates a substation in New Buffalo, Michigan to cover the tribal-owned casino, Four Winds New Buffalo.

== Legacy and honors ==
- The band took his name.
- Pokagon State Park in Indiana was named for him.
- A sculpture of Chief Pokagon is located on the south facade of the Knute Rockne Memorial on the campus of the University of Notre Dame.

== See also ==
- Simon Pokagon (Leopold's son and an advocate for repatriation of traditional Indian lands.)
- Pokagon Band of Potawatomi Indians
- Pokagon State Park
