= Simon Pokagon =

Native American advocate and author from Michigan (1830–1899)

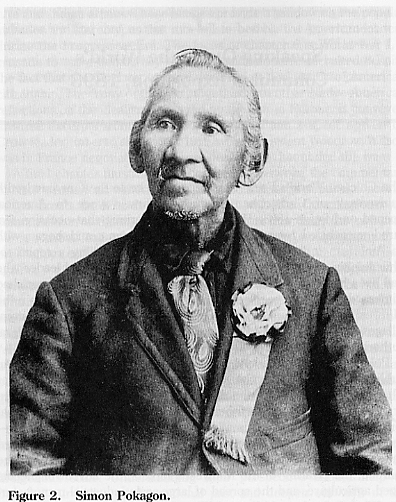
- Born: 1830; Near Bertrand, Michigan Territory
- Died: January 28, 1899 (aged 68–69); Hartford, Michigan
- Occupations: Author and advocate
- Parent: Leopold Pokagon

Simon Pokagon (c. 1830 – January 28, 1899) was a citizen of the Pokagon Band of Potawatomi Indians, an author, and a Native American rights advocate. He was born near Bertrand in southwest Michigan Territory and died on January 28, 1899, in Hartford, Michigan. Dubbed the "Red Man's Longfellow" by literary fans, Pokagon was often called the "Hereditary and Last Chief" of the tribe by the press. He was a son of his tribe's patriarch, Leopold Pokagon.

== Biography ==
Simon Pokagon was born to Potawatomi Chief Leopold Pokagon and his wife.

He claimed attendance at the University of Notre Dame and Oberlin College, but that has been challenged, as they have no record of his matriculation. He likely received education from the Sisters of St. Mary's Academy near Notre Dame and at the Twinsburg (Ohio) Institute. Some scholars have challenged his claims of fluency in four of the "classic" European languages.

== Career ==
Pokagon wrote several books and multiple shorter works. He is one of the recognized Native American authors of the 19th century.

Some have argued that his writings may have been substantially edited by the wife of his personal attorney, although that remains speculation and a matter of controversy among scholars. A manuscript letter in Pokagon's hand, donated to the Chicago History Museum in July 2024, documents that he was at work on the posthumously published O-gi-maw-kwe Mit-i-gwa-ki, Queen of the Woods and reflects a writing style like those in his published work, according to the historian and museum trustee who donated it.

Pokagon was a featured speaker at the 1893 World's Columbian Exposition in Chicago. While his popularity with some fellow tribal members waned, he was always welcomed among the Gold Coast "High Society" of Chicago and the Chautauqua literary groups of the East Coast.

He was an early activist trying to force the United States to pay monies owed pursuant to treaties and to provide fair treatment of Indian peoples. Pokagon met with President Abraham Lincoln twice to petition for payment from the government for land taken in the 1833 Treaty of Chicago. He also met with President Ulysses S. Grant to accept an expression of gratitude for the efforts of Potawatomi volunteers in the Civil War. In the 1890s, Pokagon began pressing land claims to the Chicago lakefront. A complicated individual with what often seemed to be contradictory motivations, he sold "interests" in that Chicago land claim to real estate speculators, angering some in the Pokagon community.

In much of his writings, Pokagon wrote about the past and traditional ways of life; he lamented the passing of a "vanishing" race of Indians. But the Pokagon Potawatomi were not vanishing. They had organized a Business Committee, a traditional, democratically elected tribal council that governed by consensus and advocated for the rights of tribal members. Meanwhile, most tribal members worked as laborers at local factories and farms and retained close ties to the Catholic Church. According to the historian Susan Sleeper-Smith, unlike the neighboring Miami in Indiana, who "hid in plain sight", the Pokagon Potawatomi tightly held onto their traditions and sense of community.

In a publication originally titled The Red Man's Rebuke (and subsequently The Red Man's Greeting), Pokagon wrote:

On behalf of my people, the American Indians, I hereby declare to you, the pale-faced race that has usurped our lands and homes, that we have no spirit to celebrate with you the great Columbian Fair now being held in this Chicago city, the wonder of the world. No; sooner would we hold the high joy day over the graves of our departed than to celebrate our own funeral, the discovery of America. And while...your hearts in admiration rejoice over the beauty and grandeur of this young republic and you say, 'behold the wonders wrought by our children in this foreign land,' do not forget that this success has been at the sacrifice of our homes and a once happy race.

Pokagon wrote prolifically, his books including The Red Man's Rebuke (1893), The Red Man's Greeting (1893), and O-gi-maw-kwe Mit-i-gwa-ki, Queen of the Woods (1899) which was written about his wife, Lodinaw. His role as an American Indian intellectual, tribal leader, author, speaker, temperance advocate, and environmentalist have been studied since his death, yet some sources on his life are erroneous, such as the Bureau of American Ethnology's Handbook of American Indians North of Mexico.

Pokagon's writings reflected his pride in being Indian as well as the struggle to "hide in plain view" that many Indians faced. Queen of the Woods presented a positive image of what it means to be Indian, and exposed some of the challenges that are unique to native populations. His work also demonstrates natives' efforts to indigenize forms of communication in the dominant culture. His use of the literary medium made it possible for his voice as an Indian to be heard and understood within white society.

Pokagon was not the last chief of the Potawatomi. The Pokagon have had chiefs since his death, and leadership in Potawatomi communities is not hereditary. For a while, he was the head of the Business Committee of the Pokagon Band of Potawatomi Indians, until his political fortunes soured and he was replaced. He became an ambiguous icon of an early Indian who obtained "celebrity" status.

== Appearance at the World's Columbian Exposition ==
On October 9, 1893, Pokagon was a featured speaker at the World's Columbian Exposition. He gave the mayor of Chicago a copy of a deed to Chicago wrapped in birchbark. He was also the umpire for a lacrosse game featuring Iroquois and Potawatomi athletes. He dressed in a suit but wore a feathered cap as a mark of his Potawatomi identity.

He gave a speech to a crowd of nearly 75,000, addressing the devastation of alcohol on Indians and stated that his people needed to abandon their tribal allegiance and pursue U.S. citizenship:

What can be done for the best good of . . . our race? Our children must learn that they owe allegiance to no clan or power on earth except these United States . . . [they] must be educated and learn the . . . trades of white men . . . [then] they will be able to compete with the dominant race.

Another part of his speech, published in the Chicago Tribune, reflected his hope for the progress of his tribe:

I shall cherish as long as I live the cheering words that have been spoken to me here by the ladies, friends of my race; it has strengthened and encouraged me; I have greater faith in the success of the remaining few of my people than ever before. I now realize the hand of the Great Spirit is open in our behalf; already he has thrown his great search light upon the vault of heaven, and Christian men and women are reading there in characters of fire well understood; 'The red man is your brother, and God is the father of all.'

The conclusion of the day was Pokagon's appearance on the "History of Chicago" float alongside a replica of a statue of Black Partridge.

== Legacy and honors ==
- A monument to both Simon and his father Leopold Pokagon was proposed for Chicago's Jackson Park but never built. (Jackson Park Office, Chicago Park District).
- Pokagon State Park in northern Indiana is named for both of them.

== See also ==
- Leopold Pokagon
- Pokagon Band of Potawatomi Indians

== Bibliography ==
Books

- The Red Man's Rebuke Hartford, Mich. : C.H. Engle, publisher (1893)
- The Red Man's Greeting (1893)
- O-gi-maw-kwe Mit-i-gwa-ki, Queen of the Woods (1899)

Articles

- An Indian on the Problems of His Race (1895)
- The Wild Pigeon of North America, The Chautauquan 22 (1895): 202–06
- The Future of the Red Man (1897)
- Simon Pokagon on Naming the Indians (1897)
- Indian Superstitions and Legends (1898)
- A Grateful Friend (1898)
- An Indian's Plea for Prohibition (1898)
- Massacre at Fort Dearborn at Chicago (1899)
- Algonquin Legends of South Haven (1900)
- Algonquin Legends of Paw Paw, (1900)
- The Pottawattomie Book of Genesis: Legend of the Creation of Man
- Dibangomowin Pottawattamie Ejitodwin Aunishnawbebe (1901)
- The Pottawatomies in the War of 1812 (1901)
- An Indian Idyll of Love, Sorrow and Death, (1907)
- How the Terrible Slaughter by White Men Caused Extermination of the ‘Me-Me-Og,’ or Wild Pigeon (1914).
