= James Rhea =

James Rhea (fl. 1791–1812) was a native of New Jersey, and was lieutenant and adjutant of "Rhea’s levies" in 1791. He was ensign and second lieutenant of infantry in 1799, and was promoted to first lieutenant in 1800. He was commissioned a captain in July 1807, and resigned at Fort Wayne as a result of his actions during the Siege of Fort Wayne. He had previously served under General Anthony Wayne and held command at Fort Industry.

== Fort Wayne ==
On May 15, 1810, Rhea arrived at Fort Wayne and assumed command of the fort. This would be, at a minimum, Rhea's second time commanding a river-fort in the Northwest Territory having previously commanded Fort Industry on the Maumee River. Initially described as a strong commander, Rhea ensured the completion of much needed repairs to the fort, the passage of a sanitation program, and good progress on land clearance. However, Rhea's arrival at the fort coincided with an onset of rheumatism pains that would go on to linger and affect Rhea's ability to sleep. It was speculated that these painful, reoccurring episodes in tandem with the resulting sleep deprivation, was the impetus behind Rhea's eventual 'fondness for whiskey' and later demise as a commander.
