= Topinabee (I) =

Topinabee (Chief Topinabee; He Who Sits Quietly; born 1758, died 1826) was a Potawatomi ogema, signer of multiple treaties, and "principal chief" of the Potawatomi. He was born in his father's village on the St. Joseph River in 1758. Next to his father, Old Chief Nanaquiba, he was also noted as one of the greatest Potawatomi chiefs of all time. He was documented as a great warrior and known for his great tactical decisions in many battles like his father. He signed the Treaty of Greenville in 1795, that ceded much of what is now Ohio to the United States. He later signed eleven more treaties during his leadership. He was succeeded as hereditary principal leader of the Potawatomi by Leopold Pokagon.

Chief Topinabee was the son of hereditary sachem chief of all Potawatomis, Nanaquiba, and brother to Chief Chebaas, biological grandfather of Chief Abram B. Burnett (Nan-Wesh-Mah). He was a great warrior and highly respected, intelligent chief involved in battles and noted as a war chief to Tecumseh during Tecumseh's War.

== Sources ==
- Atlas of Berrien County, p. 4.
- http://www.wiskigeamatyuk.com/Chief_Topinabe.htm
