= Potawatomi =

Algonquian Native American people

Bodéwadmi
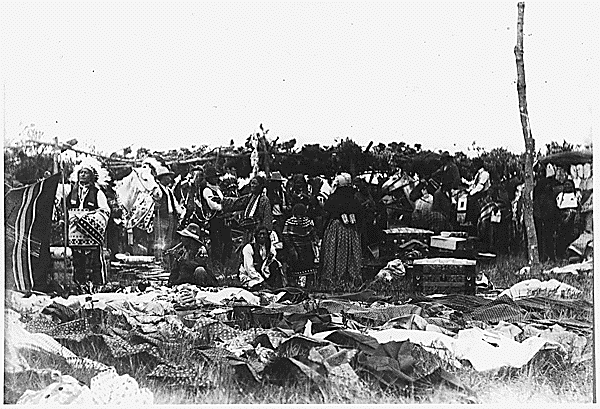
- Potawatomi at a rain dance in 1920

Total population
- 48,000+

Regions with significant populations
- United States (Indiana, Kansas, Michigan, Oklahoma, Wisconsin, Illinois); Canada (Ontario)

Languages
- English, Potawatomi

Religion
- Catholicism, Methodism, Potawatomi religion, Midewiwin

Related ethnic groups
- Ojibwe, Odawa, other Algonquian peoples

- Person: Bodéwadmi (Neshnabé)
- People: Bodéwadmik (Neshnabék)
- Language: Bodwéwadmimwen (Neshnabémwen); Hand Talk

The Potawatomi (/ˌpɒtəˈwɒtəmi/), also spelled Pottawatomi and Pottawatomie (among many variations), are an Indigenous North American tribe of the Great Plains, upper Mississippi River, and western Great Lakes region. They traditionally speak the Potawatomi language, a member of the Algonquian family. They are additionally First Nations in Canada. The Potawatomi call themselves Neshnabé, a cognate of the word Anishinaabe. They are part of a long-term alliance, the Council of Three Fires, with the Ojibwe and Odawa (Ottawa). The Potawatomi are considered the "youngest brother" among the three peoples, and are referred to in this context as Bodéwadmi ('keepers of the fire'), referring to the council fire of the alliance.

In the 19th century, some bands of Potawatomi migrated west parallel to European and American settlement. In the 1830s the federal government removed most from their lands east of the Mississippi River to Indian Territory—first in Kansas, then Nebraska, finally Oklahoma. Some bands survived in the Great Lakes region and today are federally recognized as tribes, in addition to the Oklahoma Potawatomi.

== Name ==
The English Potawatomi is derived from Ojibwe Boodewaadamii(g) (syncopated in the Ottawa language as Boodewaadmii(g)). One of the Potawatomi names for their own people (autonym) is Bodéwadmi (without syncope: Bodéwademi; pl. Bodéwadmik), a cognate of the Ojibwe form, meaning 'those who tend the hearth-fire' of the Council. The word comes from Potawatomi bodewadm (without syncope: bodewadem) 'to tend the hearth-fire'; the respective Ojibwe and Ottawa forms are boodawaadam and boodwaadam.

Alternatively, the Potawatomi call themselves Neshnabé (without syncope: Eneshenabé; pl. Neshnabék), cognate to Ojibwe Anishinaabe(g) ('original people').

== Teachings ==
The Potawatomi instruct their children in the "Seven Grandfather Teachings" of wisdom, respect, love, honesty, humility, bravery, and truth, toward all of their people and all of creation.

A key story embodies these teachings, as well as the importance of patience and listening. It follows the Water Spider's journey to retrieve fire so that the other animals can survive the cold. As the other animals step forth dubiously one after another to undertake the quest, the Water Spider sits and listens. As they finish and wrestle with their fears, she steps forward and announces that she will bring the fire. As they laugh and doubt her, she weaves a bowl out of her web and sails across the water to the fire. She brings back a hot coal to make fire, and they honor her bravery in a great celebration.

== History ==
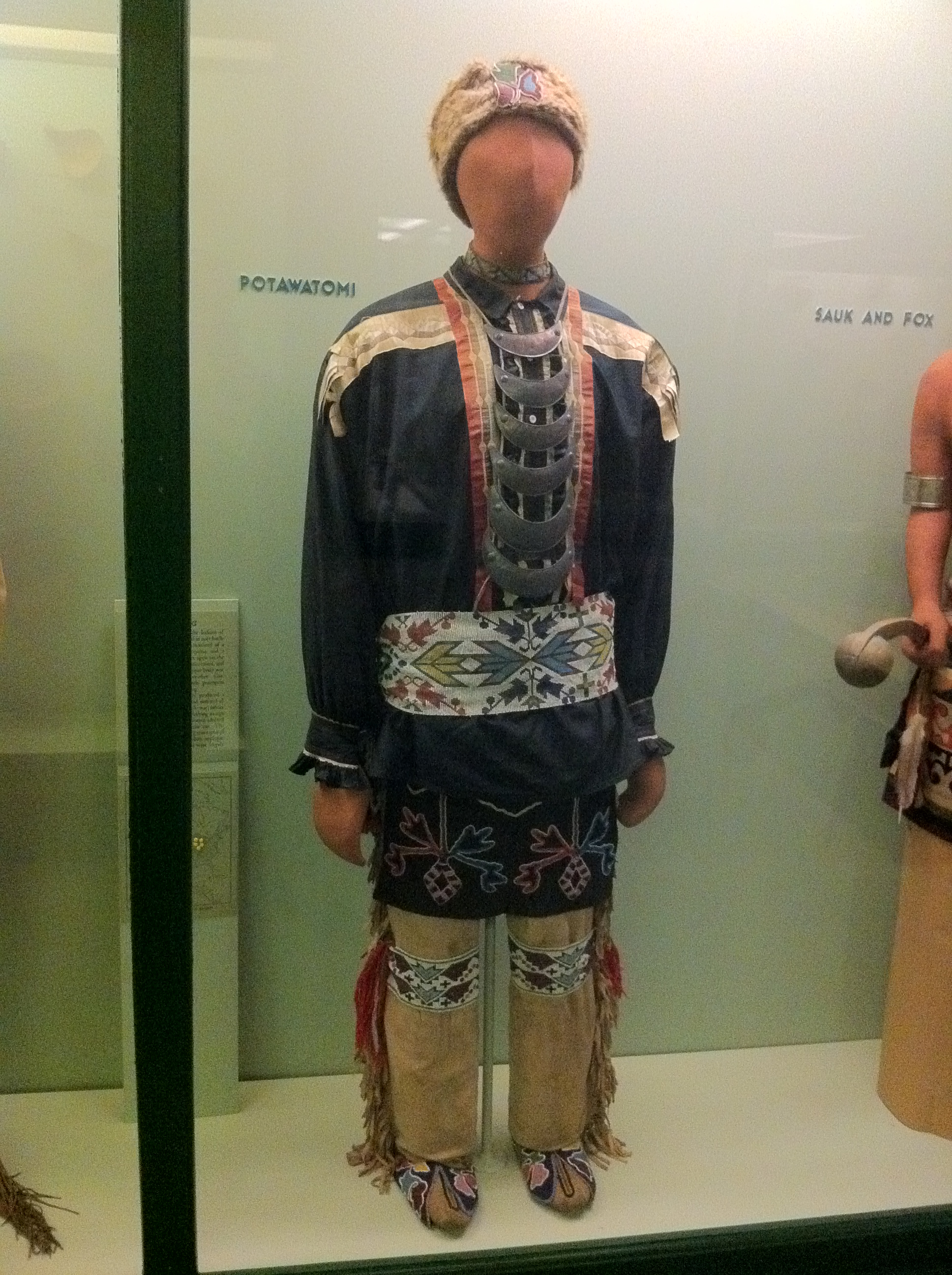
Regalia at the Field Museum in Chicago

In addition to their own history, the Potawatomi are mentioned in early 17th century French records, which suggest that they lived in what is now southwestern Michigan. During the Beaver Wars they fled to the area around Green Bay to escape the expansion of the Iroquois and the Neutral Confederacy seeking new hunting grounds. It is estimated the Potawatomi numbered around 3,000 in 1658.

As an important part of Tecumseh's Confederacy, Potawatomi warriors fought in Tecumseh's War and the War of 1812. Their alliances switched repeatedly between the United Kingdom and the United States as power shifted between the nations, and they calculated effects on their trade and land interests.

At the time of the War of 1812, a band of Potawatomi inhabited the area near Fort Dearborn, where Chicago developed. Chiefs Blackbird and Nuscotomeg (Mad Sturgeon), leading about 500 Potawatomi warriors, ambushed an American evacuation column in the Battle of Fort Dearborn. They killed most of the civilians and 54 of Captain Nathan Heald's force, and wounded many others; among them was George Ronan, the first graduate of West Point to be killed in combat. A Potawatomi chief named Mucktypoke (Makdébki, Black Partridge), had counseled against the attack, and later saved some of the civilian captives being held for ransom.

Post-contact Potawatomi history is divided into four main periods: French contact, British contact, the United States treaty, and Removal.

=== French period (1615–1763) ===
French contact began with early explorers who encountered the Potawatomi in western Michigan. They also found the tribe inhabiting the Door Peninsula of Wisconsin. By the end of the French period, the Potawatomi had begun to move near to Detroit, leaving the large communities in Wisconsin. Their chiefs included:

- Madouche during the Fox Wars
- Millouisillyny
- Onanghisse (Wnaneg-gizs "Shimmering Light") at Green Bay
- Otchik at Detroit

=== British period (1763–1783) ===
The British period began when France ceded its lands to Britain in the French and Indian War (Seven Years' War). Pontiac's Rebellion was an attempt by Native Americans to push out the British and other Europeans. The Potawatomi captured every British frontier garrison except Detroit.

The Potawatomi nation continued to grow and expanded westward from Detroit, most notably in the development of the St. Joseph villages adjacent to the Miami in southwestern Michigan. The Wisconsin communities expanded south along the Lake Michigan shoreline. Among their chiefs:

- Nanaquiba (Water Moccasin) at Detroit
- Ninivois at Detroit
- Peshibon at St. Joseph
- Washee (from Wabzi, "the Swan") at St. Joseph during Pontiac's Rebellion

=== United States treaty period (1783–1830) ===
The period lasted from the Treaty of Paris, which ended the Revolutionary War and acknowledged the United States' power in the lower Great Lakes, until the treaties for Indian removal. The US recognized the Potawatomi as a single tribe. They often had a few tribal leaders whom all villages accepted. Their society was decentralized with several geographic divisions: Milwaukee or Wisconsin area, Detroit or Huron River, the St. Joseph River, the Kankakee River, Tippecanoe and Wabash Rivers, the Illinois River and Lake Peoria, and the Des Plaines and Fox Rivers.

Chiefs are listed below by geographic area.

==== Milwaukee Potawatomi ====
- Manamol
- Siggenauk (Siginak: "Le Tourneau" or "Blackbird")

==== Chicago Potawatomi ====
- Billy Caldwell, also known as Sauganash (Zhagnash: "Englishman") (1780–1841)

==== Des Plaines and Fox River Potawatomi ====
- Aptakisic (fl. 1830s, Abtagizheg "Half Day")
- Mukatapenaise, a.k.a. Black Partridge (Mkedébnés "Blackbird")
- Waubonsie (Wabenizhi, 'He Causes Paleness,' related to 'waben' meaning dawn.)
- Waweachsetoh along with La Gesse, Gomo or Masemo (Resting Fish)

==== Illinois River Potawatomi ====
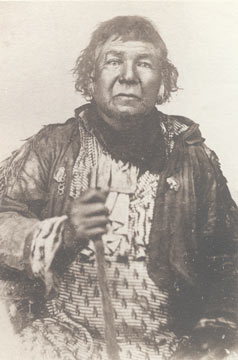
Shabbona

- Mucktypoke (Makdébki: "Black Partridge")
- Senachewine (died 1831) (Petacho or Znajjewan "Difficult Current") was the brother of Gomo who was chief among the Lake Peoria Potawatomi

==== Kankakee River (Iroquois and Yellow Rivers) Potawatomi ====
- Main Poc, also known as Webebeset ("Crafty One")
- Micsawbee 19th century
- Notawkah (Rattlesnake) on the Yellow River
- Nuscotomeg (Neshkademég, "Mad Sturgeon") on the Iroquois and Kankakee Rivers
- Mesasa (Mezsézed, "Turkey Foot")

==== St. Joseph and Elkhart Potawatomi ====
- Chebass (Zhshibés: "Little Duck") on the St. Joseph River
- Five Medals (Wa-nyano-zhoneya: "Five-coin") on the Elkhart River
- Onaska on the Elkhart River
- Topinbee (He who sits Quietly) (died 1826)

==== Tippecanoe and Wabash River Potawatomi ====
- Aubenaubee (1761–1837/8) on the Tippecanoe River
- Askum (More and More) on the Eel River
- George Cicott (1800?–1833)
- Keesass on the Wabash River
- Kewanna (1790?–1840s?) (Prairie Chicken) Eel River
- Kinkash (see Askum)
- Magaago
- Monoquet (1790s–1830s) on the Tippecanoe River
- Tiosa on the Tippecanoe River
- Winamac (Winmég, "Catfish")—allied with the British during the War of 1812
- Winamac (Winmég, "Catfish")—allied with the Americans during the War of 1812

==== Fort Wayne Potawatomi ====
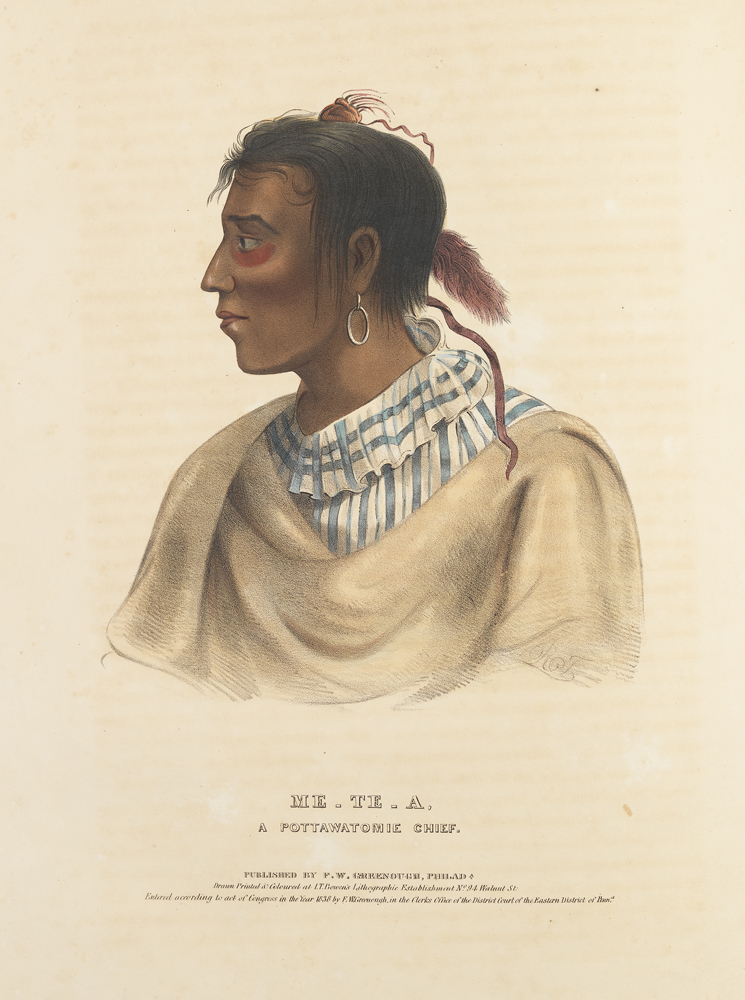
Metea lithograph (1842)

- Metea (1760?–1827) (Mdewé, "Sulks")
- Wabnaneme on the Pigeon River

=== American removal period (1830–1840) ===
The removal period of Potawatomi history began with the treaties of the late 1820s, when the United States created reservations. Billy Caldwell and Alexander Robinson negotiated for the United Nations of Chippewa, Ottawa and Potowatomi in the Second Treaty of Prairie du Chien (1829), by which they ceded most of their lands in Wisconsin and Michigan. Some Potawatomi became religious followers of the "Kickapoo Prophet", Kennekuk. Over the years, the US reduced the size of the reservations under pressure for land by incoming European Americans.

The final step followed the Treaty of Chicago, negotiated in 1833 for the tribes by Caldwell and Robinson. In return for land cessions, the US promised new lands, annuities and supplies to enable the peoples to develop new homes. The Illinois Potawatomi were removed to Nebraska and the Indiana Potawatomi to Kansas, both west of the Mississippi River. Often annuities and supplies were reduced, or late in arrival, and the Potawatomi suffered after their relocations. Those in Kansas were later removed to Indian Territory (now Oklahoma). The removal of the Indiana Potawatomi was documented by a Catholic priest, Benjamin Petit, who accompanied the Indians on the Potawatomi Trail of Death in 1838. Petit died while returning to Indiana in 1839. His diary was published in 1941, over 100 years after his death, by the Indiana Historical Society.

Many Potawatomi found ways to remain, primarily those in Michigan. Others fled to their Odawa neighbors or to Canada to avoid removal to the west.

- Iowa, Wabash River
- Maumksuck (Mangzed, "Big Foot") at Lake Geneva
- Mecosta (Mkozdé, "Having a Bear's Foot")

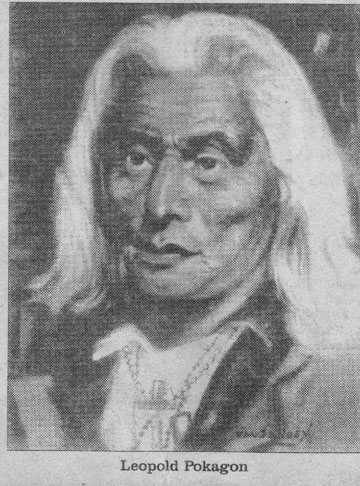
Leopold Pokagon

- Chief Menominee (1791?–1841) Twin Lakes of Marshall County
- Pamtipee of Nottawasippi
- Mackahtamoah (Mkedémwi, "Black Wolf") of Nottawasippi
- Pashpoho of Yellow River near Rochester, Indiana
- Pepinawah
- Leopold Pokagon (c. 1775–1841)
- Simon Pokagon (c. 1830–1899)
- Shupshewahno (19th century – 1841) or Shipshewana (Vision of a Lion) at Shipshewana Lake.
- Topinbee (The Younger) on the St. Joseph River
- Wabanim (Wabnem, "White Dog") on the Iroquois River
- Michicaba (Snapping Turtle) on the Iroquois River
- Wanatah
- Weesionas (see Ashkum)
- Wewesh

== Bands ==
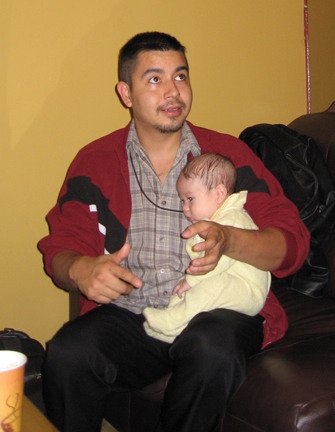
Ed Pigeon, Match-E-Be-Nash-She-Wish cultural coordinator and language instructor, with son, 2006

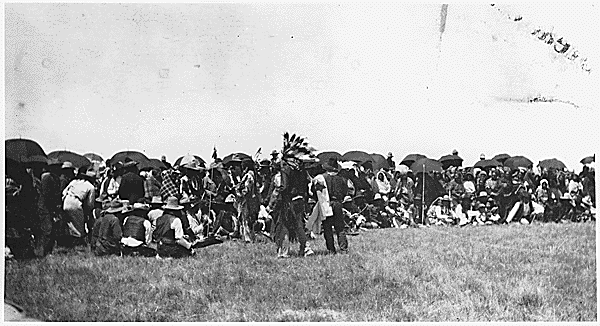
Rain dance, Kansas, c. 1920

There are several active bands of Potawatomi.

=== United States ===
Federally recognized Potawatomi tribes in the United States:

- Forest County Potawatomi Community, Wisconsin;
- Hannahville Indian Community, Michigan;
- Match-E-Be-Nash-She-Wish Band of Pottawatomi (also known as the Gun Lake tribe), based in Dorr in Allegan County, Michigan;
- Nottawaseppi Huron Band of Potawatomi, based in Calhoun County, Michigan;
- Pokagon Band of Potawatomi Indians, Michigan and Indiana; and
- Prairie Band of Potawatomi Nation, Kansas (and since 2024 Illinois).
- Citizen Potawatomi Nation, Oklahoma

=== Canada – First Nations with Potawatomi people ===
- Caldwell First Nation, Point Pelee and Pelee Island, Ontario
- Chippewas of Nawash Unceded First Nation, Bruce Peninsula, Ontario;
- Saugeen First Nation, Ontario (Bruce Peninsula);
- Chippewas of Kettle and Stony Point, Ontario;
- Moose Deer Point First Nation, Ontario
- Walpole Island First Nation, Ontario, Canada
- Wasauksing First Nation, Parry Island, Ontario
- Beausoleil First Nation, Christian Island, Georgian Bay, Ontario

== Population ==
Year	Total	United States	Canada
1667	4,000		
1765	1,500		
1766	1,750		
1778	2,250		
1783	2,000		
1795	1,200		
1812	2,500		
1820	3,400		
1843		1,800	
1854	4,440	4,040	400
1889	1,582	1,416	166
1908	2,742	2,522	220
1910	2,620	2,440	180
1997	25,000		
1998	28,000		
c. 2006	21,000	17,000	4,000
2010	23,400	21,000	2,400
2014			4,500
2018			6,700

== Clans ==
La Chauvignerie (1736) and Morgan (1877) mention among the Potawatomi doodems (clans) being:

- Bené (Turkey)
- Gagagshi (Crow)
- Gnew (Golden Eagle)
- Jejakwe' (Thunderer, i.e. Crane)
- Mag (Loon)
- Mekchi (Frog)
- Mek (Beaver)
- Mewi'a (Wolf)
- Mgezewa (Bald Eagle)
- Mkedésh-gékékwa (Black Hawk)
- Mko (Bear)
- Mshéwé (Elk)
- Mshike' (Turtle)
- Nme' (Sturgeon)
- Nmébena (Carp)
- Shage'shi (Crab)
- Wabozo (Rabbit)
- Wakeshi (Fox)

== Ethnobotany ==
They regard Epigaea repens as their tribal flower and consider it to have come directly from their divinity. Allium tricoccum is consumed in traditional Potawatomi cuisine. They mix an infusion of the root of Uvularia grandiflora with lard and use it as salve to massage sore muscles and tendons. They use Symphyotrichum novae-angliae as a fumigating reviver. Vaccinium myrtilloides is part of their traditional cuisine, and is eaten fresh, dried, and canned. They also use the root bark of the plant for an unspecified ailment.

== Location ==
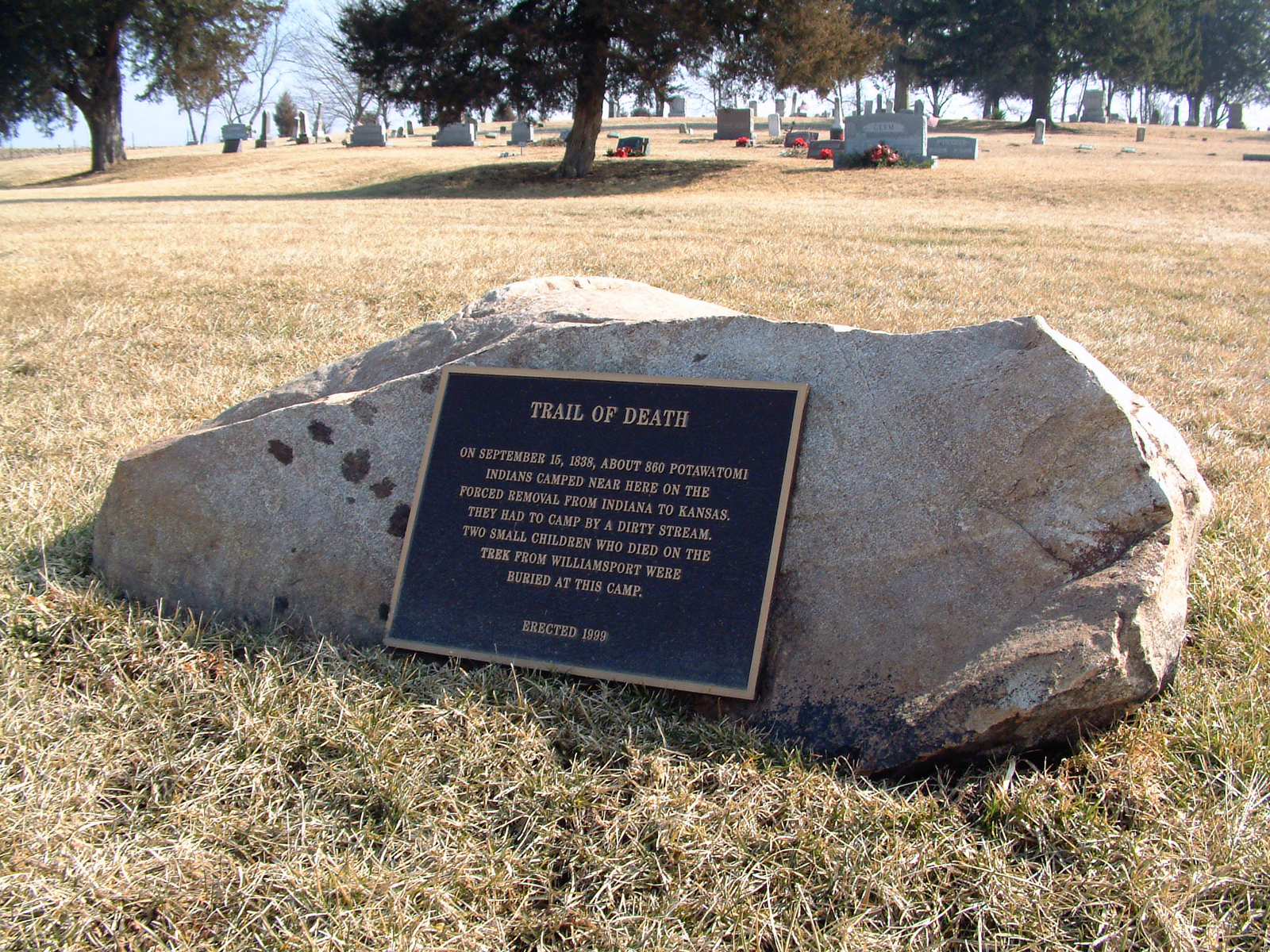
Trail of Death marker in Warren County, Indiana

The Potawatomi first lived in Lower Michigan, then moved to northern Wisconsin and eventually settled into northern Indiana and central Illinois. In the early 19th century, major portions of Potawatomi lands were seized by the US government. Following the Treaty of Chicago in 1833, by which the tribe ceded its lands in Illinois, most of the Potawatomi people were removed to Indian Territory, west of the Mississippi River. Many perished en route to new lands in the west on their journey through Iowa, Kansas, and Indian Territory, following what became known as the "Trail of Death".

Year or Century	Location
1615	East of Michilimackinac, MI
	Islands of Door Peninsula, WI (1st Fr)
1640	(until) with Hochunk (Winnebago) west of Green Bay, WI
1641	Sault Ste. Marie, MI
1670	Mouth of Green Bay, WI/MI
17th century	Milwaukee River, WI
1780s	on St. Joseph River, MI/IN

== Language ==
Potawatomi (also spelled Pottawatomie; in Potawatomi Bodéwadmimwen or Bodéwadmi Zheshmowen or Neshnabémwen) is a Central Algonquian language and is spoken around the Great Lakes in Michigan and Wisconsin. It is also spoken by Potawatomi in Kansas, Oklahoma, and in southern Ontario. As of 2001, fewer than 1,300 people spoke Potawatomi as a first language, most of them elderly. The people are working to revitalize the language, as evidenced by recent efforts such as the online Potawatomi language Dictionary created by the Citizen Potawatomi Nation or the various resources available through the Pokagon Band of Potawatomi Indians.

The Potawatomi language is most similar to the Odawa language; it also has borrowed a considerable amount of vocabulary from Sauk. Like the Odawa language, or the Ottawa dialect of the Anishinaabe language, the Potawatomi language exhibits a great amount of vowel syncope.

Many places in the Midwest have names derived from the Potawatomi language, including Waukegan, Muskegon, Oconomowoc, Pottawattamie County, Kalamazoo, and Skokie.

== Potawatomi people ==
- Ron Baker: played for the New York Knicks and the Washington Wizards.
- Tank Standing Buffalo, artist and animator
- Charles J. Chaput (born 1944 – son of a Potawatomi woman): Catholic Archbishop of Philadelphia from 2011 to 2020.
- Kelly Church (Potawatomi/Odawa/Ojibwe): basket maker, painter, and educator.
- Charles Curtis: 31st Vice President of the United States, Senate Majority Leader and Majority Whip, President pro tempore of the U.S. Senate, and U.S. representative from Kansas. Curtis's mother Ellen Pappan Curtis was one-quarter each of Kaw, Osage, Potawatomi and French ancestry; Curtis was enrolled as Kaw.
- Robin Wall Kimmerer: botanist and writer – author of Braiding Sweetgrass.
- Simon Pokagon: the "Hereditary and Last Chief" of the Pokagon Band.
- Leopold Pokagon: head of the Potawatomi in the Saint Joseph River Valley.
- Jeri Redcorn: the Oklahoman artist who revived traditional Caddo pottery.
- Angela R. Riley: chief justice of Citizen Potawatomi Nation (2010–present).
- Topinabee: head of the Potawatomi of the Saint Joseph River Valley.

== See also ==
- Cherokee Commission (allotment of Cherokee Outlet reservation)
- Potawatomi Trail of Death
- Treaty with the Potawatomi
- Prairie Band Potawatomi Nation
- Citizen Potawatomi Nation
- Pokagon Band of Potawatomi Indians
- Match-e-be-nash-she-wish Band of Pottawatomi Indians of Michigan
- Forest County Potawatomi Community
- Nottawaseppi Huron Band of Potawatomi
- Hannahville Indian Community
- Wasauksing First Nation
- Walpole Island First Nation
- Wiikwemkoong First Nation
- Theresa Marsh
- Nanabozho

== Cited sources ==
- Smith, Huron H. (1933). "Ethnobotany of the Forest Potawatomi Indians". Bulletin of the Public Museum of the City of Milwaukee. 7: 1–230.
