= List of parks in Fort Wayne, Indiana =

This is a list of parks in Fort Wayne, Indiana. As of 2024, the Fort Wayne Parks and Recreation Department maintained 87 public parks totaling 2,805 acres (11 km^{2}) and four golf courses. The department also cares for 50,000 street trees and 25,000 park trees. The largest park in the system is Franke Park which covers 329.24 acres (133 ha), while the smallest is Orff Park which covers .02 acres (0 ha). The Foellinger-Freimann Botanical Conservatory gardens cover 24,500-square-foot (2,280 m^{2}), displaying over 1,200 plants of 502 different species and 72 types of cactus.

The private parks listing only includes parks within the municipal boundaries of the city of Fort Wayne and excludes county parks or nature preserves. Those parks are privately owned or operated, though they may be accessible to the general public.

== Public parks ==
Name	Image	Size	Description
Bass Playground		0.52 acres (0.21 ha)	Bass Playground was acquired in 1928, but was informally used as a neighborhood park before that. Amenities include a basketball court and playground.
Bloomingdale Park		11.55 acres (4.67 ha)	The park was acquired in 1916 and expanded in 1979. Bloomingdale straddles the northern banks of the St. Marys River, and includes a boat launch, basketball courts, playground, and access to the Rivergreenway.
Bob Arnold Northside Park		34.47 acres (13.95 ha)	Acquired in 1979, the park was named after former parks department director Bob Arnold in 1999. The park had housed the State School and Training Center, until the state vacated and deeded the land to the City of Fort Wayne, officially opening June 4, 1983. Amenities include two pavilions, tennis courts, playground, informal soccer field, public pool, and the Fort Wayne Parks and Recreation Department's central offices.
Boone Street Playlot		0.33 acres (0.13 ha)	Acquired in 1969, this small neighborhood park includes a playground.
Bowser Park		0.92 acres (0.37 ha)	The park was donated to the community in 1932 by inventor Sylvanus Bowser and his wife Sarah. Amenities include an open-air pavilion, playground, and basketball court.
Brackenridge Playground		0.38 acres (0.15 ha)	Acquired in 1968, the small neighborhood park was dedicated in 1970. Amenities include a playground and basketball court.
Brewer Park		5.08 acres (2.06 ha)	Acquired in 1954, amenities include a playground, basketball court, and picnic tables.
Buckner Park		197.80 acres (80.05 ha)	Established in 1969 and expanded in 2002, Buckner is one of the largest municipal parks. Amenities include an open-air pavilion, restrooms, two playgrounds, a splash pad, and trails. The park is still largely undeveloped and includes mature deciduous woods and prairie.
Camp Allen Park		3.50 acres (1.42 ha)	Acquired in 1912, Camp Allen was previously a military training camp for Union troops during the U.S. Civil War. The park's namesake is Col. John Allen, a local soldier who was killed during the War of 1812. The park straddles the St. Marys River and includes a playground and basketball court.
Casselwood Park		1.50 acres (0.61 ha)	Acquired in 1975, the park includes a baseball diamond and playground.
Courthouse Green		1.08 acres (0.44 ha)	The Courthouse Green was dedicated on October 15, 1999. Previously, the Allen County Courthouse was hidden from the east by buildings which were razed to make room for the square. The green includes floral displays and benches and has become a gathering place for public demonstrations.
Daryl B. Cobin Memorial Park		6.2 acres (2.5 ha)	The park was dedicated in 2008 and features Carrington Field, home of the Fort Wayne Baseball Federation. The park is also connected to the Rivergreenway.
East Central Playlot		1.0 acre (0.40 ha)	Acquired in 1974, the park includes a playground.
Foster Park		254.86 acres (103.14 ha)	Acquired in 1912 and expanded in 1932, Foster Park is one of the city's most popular parks. The park is a major point on the Rivergreenway, preserving 4 miles (6.4 km) of riverside along the St. Marys River. Amenities include one of the city's three public golf courses, four tennis courts, three pavilions, volleyball courts, a dog park, baseball and softball diamonds, restrooms, soccer fields, playgrounds, and community gardens. A bridal glen and floral gardens are maintained along with a replica of Abraham Lincoln's birth cabin.
Franke Park		329.4 acres (133.3 ha)	Acquired in 1921, Franke Park is the largest city park and one of the most visited. The park includes Shoaff Lake, Foellinger Theatre (an amphitheater), and the Fort Wayne Zoo. Other amenities include three pavilions, restrooms, a BMX track, sledding hill, playgrounds, and hiking trails. Until its closure in 2011, the park was also home to the Jack D. Diehm Museum of Natural Resources.
Freimann Square		4.56 acres (1.85 ha)	Freimann is an urban park that was dedicated in 1971 after a donation from philanthropist and former president of Magnavox, Frank Freimann. The park is a popular events space in the warmer months and includes a fountain, benches, floral gardens, the sculpture Helmholtz by Mark di Suvero (loaned to the adjacent Fort Wayne Museum of Art) and a bronze equestrian statue by George Etienne Ganiere of Gen. Anthony Wayne, the namesake of the city.
Gren Park		5.88 acres (2.38 ha)	The park was donated to the city in 1981. Amenities include a playground, walking trail, and open-air pavilion.
Griswold Avenue Playlot		0.57 acres (0.23 ha)	Acquired in 1931, the park includes a playground.
Guldlin Park		8.17 acres (3.31 ha)	Acquired in 1897, the park includes a boat launch and is preserved as open space to hold flood waters from the adjacent St. Marys River.
Hamilton Park		16.50 acres (6.68 ha)	Acquired in 1903 and expanded in 1930, the park includes baseball and softball diamonds, three playgrounds, three tennis courts, an open-air pavilion, permanent picnic tables, and trails.
Hanna Homestead Park		2.54 acres (1.03 ha)	Acquired in 1966, the park includes a playground, ball diamond, basketball court, open-air pavilion, and paved trail loop.
Hanna's Ford Park		—	Undeveloped natural open space along the St. Joseph River.
Headwaters Park		30 acres (12 ha)	Acquired in 2000, Headwaters Park was constructed from 1995 to 1999 as a flood control project downtown along the St. Marys River. Split down the middle by southbound US 27 (locally Clinton Street), the east and west sides of the park include festival plazas; Headwaters is home to the largest festival in the region (Three Rivers Festival) and includes several other festivals and events annually. An ice rink is open in the winter months. The park includes the Lincoln Financial and Madge Rothschild pavilions, Hamilton Sculpture Garden, an amphitheater, restrooms, splash pad, and is connected to the Rivergreenway.
Indian Village Park		10.50 acres (4.25 ha)	Acquired in 1926, the park is located on the north shore of the St. Marys River and is connected to the Rivergreenway. Amenities include the Sears Pavilion, a playground, and natural open space.
Ivan Lebamoff Reservoir Park		13.10 acres (5.30 ha)	Acquired in 1880, Reservoir Park was the site of the city's first municipal reservoir until the early 1960s when it became obsolete. The park includes a 50 feet (15 m) mound, fishing pond, fountain, Cooper Community Center, basketball courts, and a playground. The park was renamed after former mayor and park board member Ivan Lebamoff in 2009.
Japanese Friendship Garden		0.11 acres (0.045 ha)	The small garden was gifted from the city's sister city, Takaoka, Japan. The garden is located between the Arts United Center and Fort Wayne Museum of Art downtown.
Jehl Park		3.66 acres (1.48 ha)	Acquired in 1979, the park includes a tennis court, basketball court, playground, and trail loop with fitness stations.
John Street Park		0.17 acres (0.069 ha)	Acquired in 1975, the park includes a playground.
Johnny Appleseed Park		31 acres (13 ha)	Acquired in 1973, the park is named after American folklore hero Johnny Appleseed, who is believed to be buried here. Hugging the St. Joseph River, the park is connected to the Rivergreenway and provides access to fishing with a boat launch. Other amenities include a 41-site campground, picnic area, and playground. The park also hosts one of the largest annual events in the region, the Johnny Appleseed Festival. The park is adjacent to the Allen County War Memorial Coliseum.
Justin Study Park		5 acres (2.0 ha)	Acquired in 1932 and expanded in 1975, the park includes basketball courts, tennis courts, an open-air pavilion, and playground.
Kettler Park		6.25 acres (2.53 ha)	Acquired in 1947, the park includes two tennis courts, a basketball court, permanent picnic tables, open-air pavilion, playground, and informal ball diamond.
Klug Park		1.96 acres (0.79 ha)	Acquired in 1916, the park includes a basketball court and playground.
Kreager Park		223.64 acres (90.50 ha)	Though much of the land remains undeveloped after property acquisitions in 1992 and 1997, the park includes four lighted softball fields, the city's first "boundless playground," a splash pad, eight tennis courts, eight lighted soccer fields, and access to the Rivergreenway on the north side of the Maumee River.
Lafayette Park		1.80 acres (0.73 ha)	Acquired in 1915, the park includes an open-air pavilion, two tennis courts, and two playgrounds.
Lakeside Park		23.81 acres (9.64 ha)	Acquired in 1908 and 1912, the park includes three ponds (with access to fishing), a fountain, two basketball courts, two pavilions, a playground, and tennis courts. Lakeside is popular for its sunken floral gardens. It has been designated a National Rose Garden since 1928, with more than 2,000 rose plants of 150 varieties.
Lawton Park		39.33 acres (15.92 ha)	One of the city's oldest parks, Lawton was acquired in 1866 for use as the Indiana State Fairgrounds. Amenities include three informal ball diamonds, an informal football field, playground, 20,000-square-foot (1,900 m^{2}) skate park, greenhouse (housing 130,000 plants for the Fort Wayne Parks and Recreation Department), and access to the Rivergreenway.
Lindenwood Nature Preserve		110 acres (45 ha)	Acquired as a city park in 1987, Lindenwood was granted nature preserve status from the Indiana Department of Natural Resources in 1994. The preserve contains a pond, dense mature deciduous forest, and hiking trails.
Lions Park		14.35 acres (5.81 ha)	Acquired in 1953, the park includes four pickleball courts, a ball diamond, basketball court, tennis court, playground, and open-air pavilion.
Little Turtle Memorial		0.13 acres (0.053 ha)	The final resting place for Miami tribe chief, Little Turtle, the land was donated in 1959 and dedicated in 1960.
Mason Park		—	Includes three ball fields used for Elmhurst Little League.
McCormick Park		9 acres (3.6 ha)	The park was donated in 1927 by International Harvester. Amenities include a pavilion, playground, basketball court, splash pad, restrooms, and picnic tables.
McCulloch Park		4.10 acres (1.66 ha)	The park was donated by Hugh McCulloch (former U.S. Secretary of the Treasury). Originally a public cemetery, the buried were relocated to nearby Lindenwood Cemetery. Indiana's seventh governor, Samuel Bigger, remains buried here. Amenities include a gazebo, playground, and picnic tables.
McMillen Park		168.15 acres (68.05 ha)	The largest park on the city's southeast side, McMillen was donated by Central Soya founder Dale W. McMillen in 1937. Amenities include a pavilion, restrooms, 82,000 square feet (7,600 m^{2}) community center, one of the city's three public golf courses, a driving range, public pool, playground, three ball diamonds, four basketball courts, four tennis courts, and a lacrosse and football field.
Memorial Park		42 acres (17 ha)	Acquired in 1918, amenities include a ball diamond, public pool, splash pad, pavilion, playground, and five basketball courts. Named in honor of local men and women who served the U.S. during World War I, a memorial wall and monuments are located here.
Miner Playground		1.76 acres (0.71 ha)	Acquired in 1973, the park includes a playground.
Moody Park		5.14 acres (2.08 ha)	Acquired in 1864, the park is one of the oldest in the system. Amenities include an open-air pavilion, playground, basketball court, and picnic tables.
Noll Park		9.17 acres (3.71 ha)	The park was gifted to the city in 1974. One of the most passive parks in the system, the area is mostly dense deciduous woodlands.
Nuckols Memorial Park		1.36 acres (0.55 ha)	Acquired in 1876, the park was originally called Hayden Park. In 1986, the park was renamed in honor of Fort Wayne's first African American city councilman, John Nuckols. A monument statue and plaque commemorating Nuckols is located here.
Old Fort Park		0.20 acres (0.081 ha)	Acquired in 1863, Old Fort Park is the oldest municipal park in the system. The park includes volleyball courts, horseshoe pits, and the original well from the 1794 fortification.
Orff Park		0.02 acres (0.0081 ha)	Acquired in 1892, Orff is the smallest park in the system. The park includes a monument and bus shelter. The statue is a memorial donated by the Old Aqueduct Club in 1927. Titled Let's Go Swimming, the sculpture depicts two young men in overalls walking to Fort Wayne's aqueduct for a swim.
Packard Park		4.18 acres (1.69 ha)	Acquired in 1937, the park includes an open-air pavilion, two playgrounds, two tennis courts, and a softball diamond.
Pontiac Block Park		0.17 acres (0.069 ha)	The park includes a basketball court.
Promenade Park		4.5 acres (1.8 ha)	This park opened in 2019 and is connected to the Rivergreenway. This park is split into two parts by the St. Mary's River and features a playground, event space, a small restaurant, and equipment for outdoor games including table tennis and cornhole.
Psi Ote Park		8.90 acres (3.60 ha)	Acquired in 1953, the park includes an open-air pavilion, playground, and a basketball court.
Rea Park		9 acres (3.6 ha)	The park was donated in 2003 by nearby Rea Magnet Wire. A soccer field and natural open space are included.
Robert E. Meyers Park		1.50 acres (0.61 ha)	Named for former Fort Wayne mayor Robert Meyers, the park was dedicated in 2009 as part of the Harrison Square development. Adjacent to Parkview Field, amenities include an amphitheater and splash pad.
Rockhill Park		27.77 acres (11.24 ha)	Amenities include a ball diamond, basketball court, playground, open-air pavilion, and a connection to the Rivergreenway.
Roosevelt Park		1.50 acres (0.61 ha)	Acquired in 1919, the park is preserved for natural open space and offers a connection to the Rivergreenway.
Ronald G. Repka Memorial Park		3.28 acres (1.33 ha)	Acquired in 2003, amenities include an open-air pavilion, playground, paved walking trails, and a bioswale.
Rudisill–Fairfield Park		0.10 acres (0.040 ha)	Acquired in 1976, the pocket park includes a bench and flagpole.
Solomon Farm Park		174 acres (70 ha)	Donated to the city in 1995, the park is maintained as a working farm. The park includes a learning center, YMCA facility, pond, wetlands, woods, and paved walking trails. A farmers' market and fall festival are annual events held here.
Sieling Block Park		0.60 acres (0.24 ha)	Acquired in 1915, the park offers open space.
Shoaff Park		184.48 acres (74.66 ha)	Acquired in 1955, Shoaff Park offers the most amenities of any park in the system. The park hugs 1.3 miles (2.1 km) of the St. Joseph River shoreline, and includes a boat launch and fishing access. Other amenities include one of the city's three municipal golf courses, a driving range, Frisbee disc golf course, two pavilions, playground, splash pad, baseball diamond, and a soccer field. Several miles of paved walking trails are included, with a connection to the Rivergreenway forthcoming in 2015–2016.
Strathmore Park		—	Undeveloped natural open space.
Summit Street Block Park		0.34 acres (0.14 ha)	Acquired in 1976, the park includes a playground, benches, and picnic tables.
Swinney Park		94.56 acres (38.27 ha)	The park is bisected by the St. Marys River, separating the park into an east and west side. The east section was acquired in 1896, while the west was acquired in 1918. Swinney was home to an amusement park from 1920 until 1953. The Swinney Homestead and Log Cabin located in the park (pictured in 1934) was listed on the National Register of Historic Places in 1981. Amenities include access to fishing, a pond, two playgrounds, eight tennis courts, a ball diamond, basketball court, Japanese pavilion, Jaenicke Gardens, disc golf course, open natural space, and a connection to the Rivergreenway.
Tillman Park		70 acres (28 ha)	Acquired in 1966, includes the southern terminus of the Rivergreenway, a soccer field, playground, three ball diamonds, Stewart McMillen Tennis Center, and picnic tables.
Turpie Playlot		.62 acres (0.25 ha)	Acquired in 1969, the park includes a playground.
Vesey Park		15.40 acres (6.23 ha)	Acquired in 1912 and expanded in 1934, Vesey Park preserves natural open space and woods along Spy Run Creek.
Waynedale Gardens		1.10 acres (0.45 ha)	Acquired in 1975, amenities includes a playground and natural open space.
Waynedale Park		8 acres (3.2 ha)	Acquired in 1957, amenities include two tennis courts, a basketball court, horseshoe pit, playground, restrooms, open-air pavilion, splash pad, and exercise stations.
Weisser Park		20 acres (8.1 ha)	Acquired in 1909 and expanded in 1916, amenities include a ball diamond, recreation center, open-air pavilion, playground, basketball court, and two tennis courts.
Wells Street Park		.11 acres (0.045 ha)	The pocket park offers benches and open space.
West Central Playlot		.09 acres (0.036 ha)	Acquired in 1972, amenities includes a playground and open space.
Williams Park		.74 acres (0.30 ha)	Donated to the city in 1890, the small neighborhood park includes open space.
Zeis Park		.05 acres (0.020 ha)	Owned by the Fort Wayne Division of Public Works, the area is undeveloped.

== Private parks ==
- Camp Thomas A. Scott Wetlands Nature Preserve
- Crystal Spring Park
- Eagle Marsh
- Dupont Sport and Fitness Park
- Fort Wayne Police Memorial Garden
- Indian Trails Park
- Klotz Park
- Library Plaza
- Lutheran Park and Gardens
- Mengerson Nature Reserve
- Northwood Park
- I&M Power Center Plaza
- Parkview Family Park
- Praise Park
- Van Hoozen Community Park
- Westlawn Park

== See also ==
- Fort Wayne Daisies
