= Memorial Stadium (Fort Wayne) =

Former baseball stadium in Fort Wayne, Indiana, U.S.

- The Castle
- Interactive map of Memorial Stadium
- Location: 1616 East Coliseum Boulevard; Fort Wayne, Indiana 46805
- Coordinates: 41°6′50.71″N 85°7′8.37″W
- Owner: City of Fort Wayne
- Operator: Allen County War Memorial Coliseum
- Capacity: 6,516
- Surface: Grass
- Field size: Left field - 330 ft Center Field - 400 ft Right field - 330 ft

Construction
- Opened: April 18, 1993
- Closed: 2008
- Demolished: June–July 2009

Tenant
- Fort Wayne Wizards (MWL) (1993-2008)

Memorial Stadium was a stadium located in Johnny Appleseed Park in Fort Wayne, Indiana. It was primarily used for baseball, and was the home field of the Fort Wayne Wizards of the Midwest League baseball team. Memorial Stadium was dedicated on April 18, 1993, before a sold-out crowd.

One of the most historic moments for the stadium came April 24, 1994 when Alex Rodriguez hit the first professional home run of his career.

Memorial Stadium hosted its final baseball game August 28, 2008, with 6,106 in attendance, between the Wizards and South Bend Silver Hawks. Highlights included the ceremonial first pitch thrown by 2008 Summer Olympic Gold medalist Lloy Ball and the national anthem performed by the Fort Wayne Philharmonic Orchestra. The final attendance recorded for Memorial Stadium was 4,046,261.

Memorial Stadium's replacement, Parkview Field, opened for the 2009 season in downtown Fort Wayne as the new home for the franchise. In the summer of 2009, Memorial Stadium was demolished.
