= Fort Wayne TinCaps =

American Minor League baseball team

- Founded in 1947 in Mattoon, Illinois; Based in Fort Wayne, Indiana since 1993
Team logo
Cap insignia

Minor league affiliations
- Class: High-A (2021–present)
- Previous classes: Class A (1993–2020)
- League: Midwest League (1993–present)
- Division: East Division

Major league affiliations
- Team: San Diego Padres (1999–present)
- Previous teams: Minnesota Twins (1993–1998)

Minor league titles
- League titles (1): 2009
- Division titles (3): 2009; 2012; 2017
- Second-half titles (1): 2023

Team data
- Name: Fort Wayne TinCaps (2009–present)
- Previous names: Fort Wayne Wizards (1993–2008)
- Colors: Forest green, red, tin, black, white
- Mascot: Johnny Tincap
- Ballpark: Parkview Field (2009–present)
- Previous parks: Memorial Stadium (1993–2008)
- Owner/ Operator: Hardball Capital
- President: Mike Nutter
- Manager: Jon Mathews
- Website: milb.com/fort-wayne

The Fort Wayne TinCaps are a Minor League Baseball team based in Fort Wayne, Indiana. The TinCaps compete in the Midwest League as the High-A affiliate of the San Diego Padres. The team plays its home games at Parkview Field. The TinCaps won the Midwest League championship in 2009.

== History ==
The Midwest League came to Fort Wayne in 1993. The franchise is the oldest in the Midwest League and dates back to the league's beginning as the Illinois State League, starting in 1947 in Mattoon, Illinois as the Mattoon Indians. In 1958 the team moved to Keokuk, Iowa, where it spent five seasons as the Keokuk Cardinals; it was then based in Wisconsin Rapids, Wisconsin (1963–1983) and Kenosha, Wisconsin (1984–1992) before moving to Fort Wayne. The team was a Minnesota Twins farm team before they affiliated with the Padres in 1999. When the team moved to Fort Wayne in 1993, it adopted a new name, the Wizards.

The name TinCaps was chosen following the 2008 season, alluding to John Chapman, better known as Johnny Appleseed (1774–1845). The Tin Cap refers to the story (dating back to the 19th century), that Johnny Appleseed wore a tin cooking pot as a hat, though this depiction has been disputed by historians. Chapman spent his final years in Fort Wayne and is buried in the city.

The team's home park was Memorial Stadium, opened in 1993; a franchise attendance record of 318,506 was also set that year. As part of the Harrison Square revitalization project, Parkview Field became the official home of the TinCaps at the start of the 2009 season. To coincide with the new ballpark, the team held a contest to determine a new name for the Wizards once that new ballpark opened, and "TinCaps" was the result.

The mascot of the TinCaps is Johnny TinCap. Previously, for the Wizards, it was Dinger the Dragon and prior to that, the Wizards were represented by Wayne the Wizard.

The team won the Midwest League 2009 championship by sweeping the Burlington Bees, 3–0. The first two games were played at Parkview Field and the final, decisive game was played in Burlington, Iowa. The team and its staff were honored at Parkview Field in a special victory rally on September 18, 2009. In addition to winning a franchise record-setting 94 games in their new home, fans shattered the previous attendance record for the season, with 378,529 coming through the turnstiles.

The TinCaps also clinched playoff spots in every season of Parkview Field's existence with the exception of 2016.

In conjunction with Major League Baseball's restructuring of Minor League Baseball in 2021, the TinCaps were organized into the High-A Central. In 2022, the High-A Central became known as the Midwest League, the name historically used by the regional circuit prior to the 2021 reorganization.

== Playoffs ==
Season	Quarterfinals	Semifinals	Finals
1993–1994	DNQ		
1995	L, 2–0, Michigan	-	-
1996	DNQ		
1997	W, 2–0, West Michigan	L, 2–0, Lansing	-
1998	W, 2–1, Peoria	L, 2–0, Rockford	-
1999	DNQ		
2000	L, 2–0, Michigan	-	-
2001–2002	DNQ		
2003	L, 2–0, Battle Creek	-	-
2004	L, 2–0, South Bend	-	-
2005	L, 2–1, West Michigan	-	-
2006	L, 2–1, West Michigan	-	-
2007–2008	DNQ		
2009	W, 2–1, South Bend	W, 2–1, Great Lakes	W, 3–0, Burlington
2010	L, 2–0, Great Lakes	-	-
2011	W, 2–0, Bowling Green	L, 2–0, Lansing	-
2012	W, 2–0, Lansing	W, 2–1, Lake County	L, 3–1, Wisconsin
2013	W, 2–0, Bowling Green	L, 2–1, South Bend	-
2014	W, 2–1, West Michigan	L, 2–0, Lake County	-
2015	L, 2–0, West Michigan	-	-
2016	DNQ		
2017	W, 2–0, Bowling Green	W, 2–1, Dayton	L, 3–0, Quad Cities
2018–2019	DNQ		
2020	Season canceled		
2021–2022	DNQ		
2023	-	L, 2–1, Great Lakes	-

== Awards and honors ==
- 2009 – Midwest League championship
- 2009 – MiLBY Awards "Overall Team of the Year"

== All-time team ==
On August 24, 2008, The Journal Gazette and the franchise selected the all-time Wizards team members.

- Manager
  - Randy Ready
- Catcher
  - Javier Valentín
- First Baseman:
  - John Scheschuk
- Second Baseman:
  - Josh Barfield
- Third Baseman:
  - Sean Burroughs
- Shortstop:
  - Luis Rivas
- Designated Hitter:
  - Josh Loggins
- Outfielders:
  - Torii Hunter
  - Jeremy Owens
  - Will Venable
  - Kevin Reese
- Starting Pitchers:
  - Jake Peavy
  - LaTroy Hawkins
  - Tom Mott
  - Mike Ekstrom
  - Gabe Ribas
- Relief Pitchers:
  - J. J. Trujillo
  - Dale Thayer

== Roster ==
Fort Wayne TinCaps roster
Players	Coaches/Other
Pitchers: 27 Clark Candiotti; -- Jaxon Dalena; -- Vicarte Domingo; -- Clay Edmondson; 32 Luis Germán; -- Igor Gil; -- Bernard Jose; -- Kannon Kemp; -- Ian Koenig; 10 Isaiah Lowe; -- Kash Mayfield; 36 Maikel Miralles; -- Carson Montgomery; -- Kleiber Olmedo; -- Abraham Parra; 36 Braian Salazar; 8 Will Varmette; -- Jeferson Villabona; 28 C.J. Widger; Catchers: 33 Lamar King Jr.; -- Oswaldo Linares; -- Carlos Rodriguez; Infielders: 23 Jack Costello; 34 Zach Evans; -- Dylan Grego; 16 Jonathan Vastine; 1 Rosman Verdugo; Outfielders: 43 Jake Cunningham; -- Alex McCoy; -- Kavares Tears; 12 Kasen Wells	Manager: 5 Jon Mathews; Coaches: 29 Yorman Bazardo (pitching); 50 Jerry Downs (hitting); 2 Luis Mendez (bench); 60-day injured list: -- Tyler Morgan; 7-day injured list; * On San Diego Padres 40-man roster; ~ Development list; # Rehab assignment; ∞ Reserve list; ‡ Restricted list; § Suspended list; † Temporarily inactive list; Roster updated April 1, 2026; Transactions; → More rosters: MiLB • Midwest League; → San Diego Padres minor league players

== Former TinCaps/Wizards in the majors ==
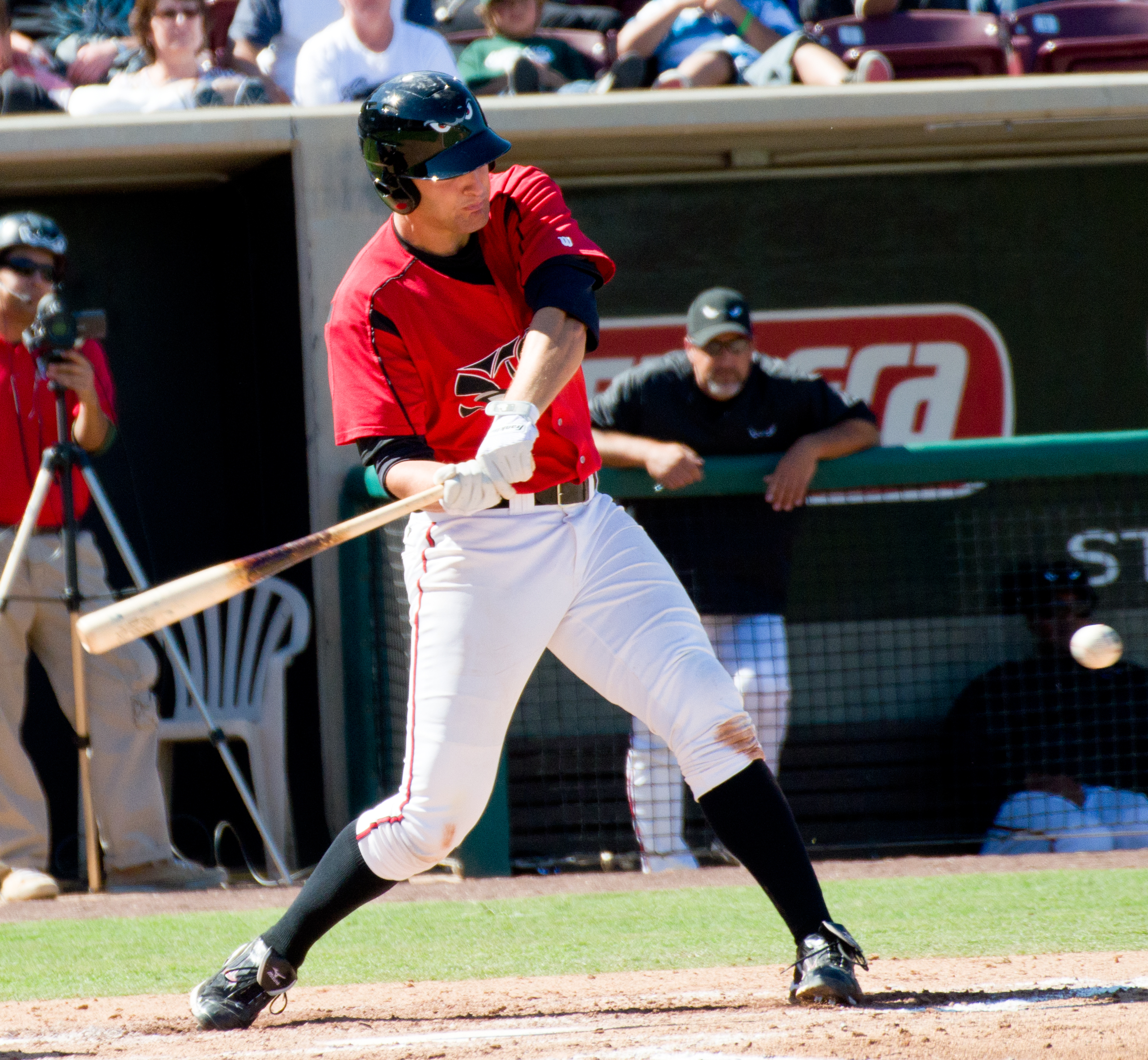
Nate Freiman

Dylan Axelrod, Trea Turner, Torii Hunter, Jake Peavy, Joakim Soria, Nate Freiman, David Freese, Max Fried, Will Venable, Nick Hundley, Matt Antonelli, Josh Geer, Josh Barfield, A. J. Pierzynski, Michael Cuddyer, Wade LeBlanc, Corey Koskie, Dirk Hayhurst, LaTroy Hawkins, Matt Lawton, Brandon Gomes, Mat Latos, Daniel Robertson, Allan Dykstra, Brad Brach, Matt Wisler, Corey Kluber, Dan Serafini, Mike Hazen, Miles Mikolas, Josh VanMeter, Fernando Tatis Jr., Matt Waldron, Tirso Ornelas, and Jackson Merrill

== See also ==
- History of sports in Fort Wayne, Indiana

== Sources ==
- Dinda, J. (2003), "Fort Wayne, Indiana, in the Midwest League"
- TinCaps are champions The Journal Gazette
