= Foellinger-Freimann Botanical Conservatory =

Botanical gardens in Fort Wayne, Indiana, U.S.

- Interactive map of Foellinger-Freimann Botanical Conservatory
- Nearest city: Fort Wayne, Indiana
- Coordinates: 41°04′32″N 85°8′22″W

The Foellinger–Freimann Botanical Conservatory is an enclosed conservatory in downtown Fort Wayne, Indiana, United States. Opened in 1983, the conservatory contains a 25,000-square-foot (2,300 m^{2}) seasonal showcase garden, a tropical oasis display, with a waterfall, Sonoran Desert display, and outdoor terrace and exploration garden, encompassing a total of 100,000-square-foot (9,300 m^{2}). The gardens display over 1,200 plants of 502 different species and 72 types of cactus.

== Gallery ==
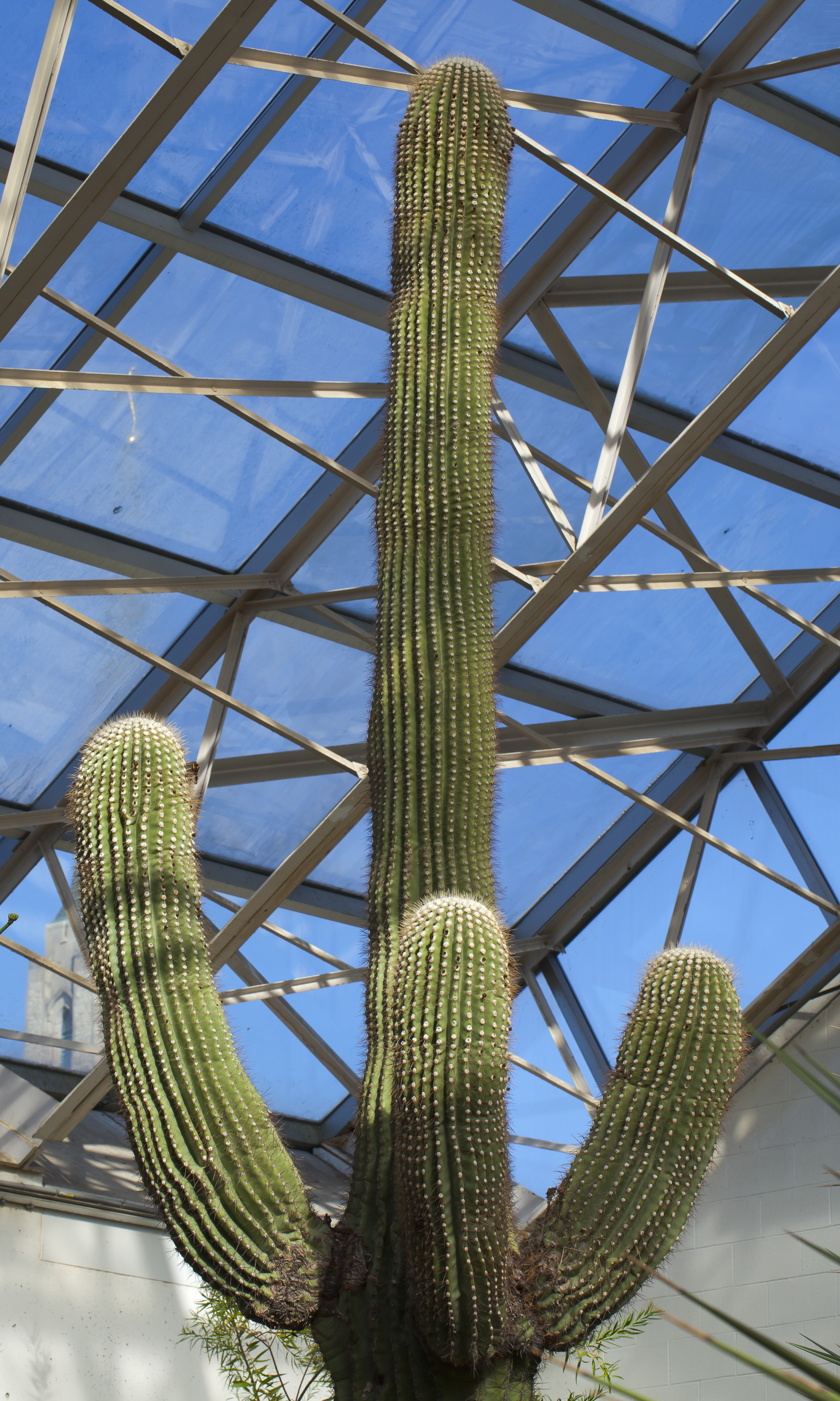
A saguaro cactus in the Sonoran Desert display

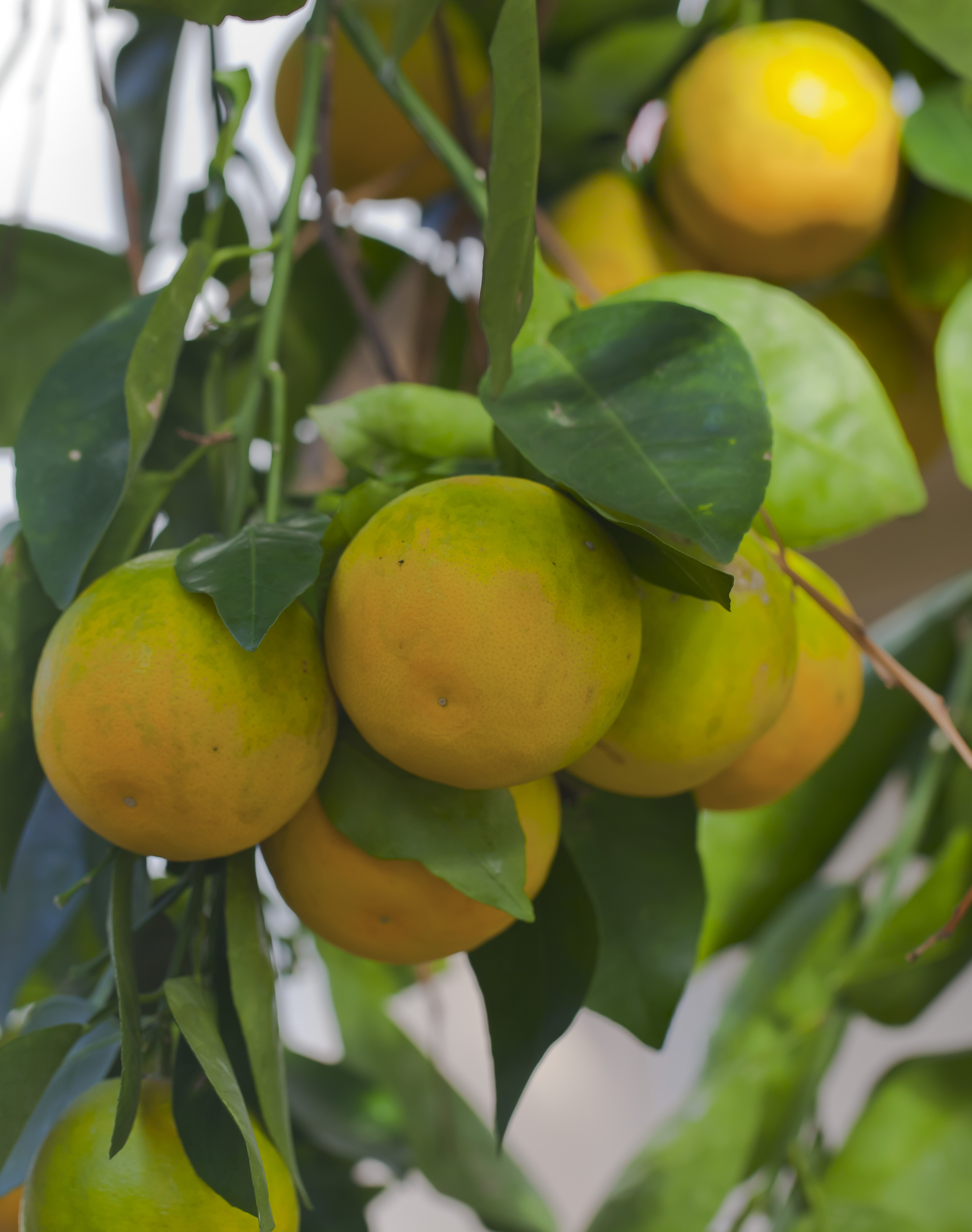
The Common orange in the Botanical Conservatory

== See also ==
- List of parks in Fort Wayne, Indiana
- List of botanical gardens and arboretums in Indiana
