= Grand Wayne Convention Center =

Convention center in Fort Wayne, Indiana, U.S.

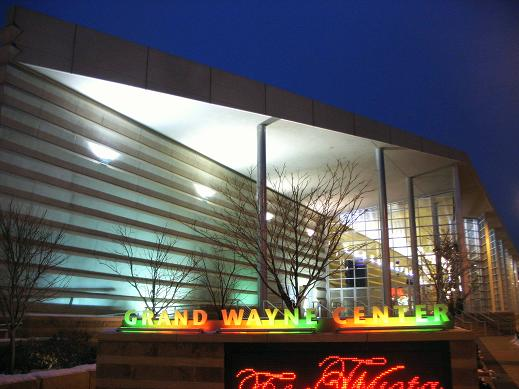
- Façade of the Grand Wayne Center, looking east from West Jefferson Blvd.
- Interactive map of Grand Wayne Convention Center
- Address: 120 West Jefferson Boulevard
- Location: Fort Wayne, Indiana, United States
- Coordinates: 41°4′35″N 85°8′25″W
- Owner: Fort Wayne–Allen County Convention and Tourism Authority

Construction
- Built: 1983–1985
- Opened: January 1985
- Renovated: 2003–2005
- Expanded: 2003–2005

Website
- www.grandwayne.com

The Grand Wayne Center is a convention center located in downtown Fort Wayne, Indiana, Allen County, United States. As a result of a $42 million renovation and expansion from 2003 to 2005, the Grand Wayne now encompasses 225,000 square feet (20,900 m^{2}).

== Facility ==
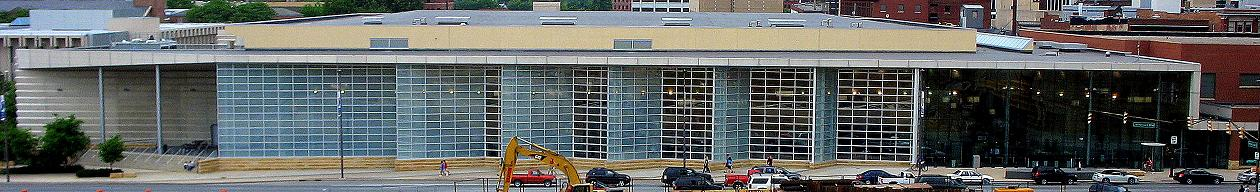
The Grand Wayne's expanded west wing from Harrison Square (2009).

Located on the first floor, the central convention hall of the Grand Wayne consists of 50,000 square feet (4,600 m^{2}) in addition to the Anthony Wayne Ballroom, which consists of 10,000 square feet (930 m^{2}). Together, both the Harrison and Jefferson Meeting Rooms encompass nearly 10,000 square feet (930 m^{2}). On the second floor, the Calhoun Ballroom covers 6,000 square feet (560 m^{2}) alongside The Gallery, which covers 1,680 square feet (156 m^{2}). The Grand Wayne Center's north and south façades feature 1,830 floor-to-ceiling exterior windowpanes with two exterior waterfalls, at the intersections of West Jefferson and West Washington Boulevards with Harrison Street.

Two hotels currently join the convention center. A nine-floor, 244-room attached Hilton Hotel operates at the east wing of the Grand Wayne Center. Also a six-floor, 250-room Courtyard by Marriott attached via a skywalk operates just south of the main entrance to the Grand Wayne Center.

== See also ==
- List of convention centers in the United States
- List of music venues in the United States
