= Old Fort Park =

Park in Fort Wayne, Indiana, United States

- Interactive map of Old Fort Park
- Coordinates: 41°04′53.0″N 85°08′02.0″W
- Area: .2 acres (0.081 ha)
- Created: 1863 (acquired)
- Operator: Fort Wayne Parks and Recreation
- Status: Open all year

Old Fort Park is the oldest park in Fort Wayne, Indiana. It was established in 1863.

== History ==
In 1863, Harry Seymour sold the land used for the park to the city for $800, making it the first official park in Fort Wayne. Civil war veteran Henry M. Williams additionally donated an iron fence and flagpole to the site.

== Features ==
Hence the name, the .20 acre park is home to the original well used by inhabitants of the first Fort Wayne established on October 22, 1794, dedicated to General Anthony Wayne. The fort was allegedly moved and rebuilt on this location in 1798, with completion in 1804. In 1815/1816, after the Siege of Fort Wayne, a third fort was built here on this site by Major John Whistler.
