= Parkview Field =

Baseball stadium in Fort Wayne, Indiana, US

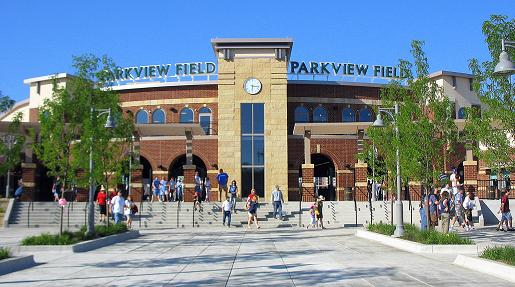

- Location within Indiana Location within the United States
- Location: 1301 Ewing Street; Fort Wayne, IN 46802
- Coordinates: 41°4′26.6″N 85°8′34.3″W
- Owner: Hardball Capital
- Operator: Hardball Capital
- Capacity: 6,516 (fixed seats); 9,266 (lawn and standing room)
- Surface: Kentucky Bluegrass
- Field size: Left Field – 336 ft (102 m); Center Field – 400 ft (122 m); Right Field – 318 ft (97 m)

Construction
- Groundbreaking: December 26, 2007
- Opened: April 16, 2009
- Cost: $30.6 million ($45.9 million in 2025 dollars)
- Architect: Populous
- Structural engineer: Engineering Resources Inc.
- Services engineer: Henderson Engineers Inc.
- General contractor: Weigand Construction

Tenant
- Fort Wayne TinCaps (MWL) (2009–present)

Parkview Field is a ballpark in Fort Wayne, Indiana. It is the home of the Fort Wayne TinCaps, a Minor League Baseball team in the Midwest League.

== History ==
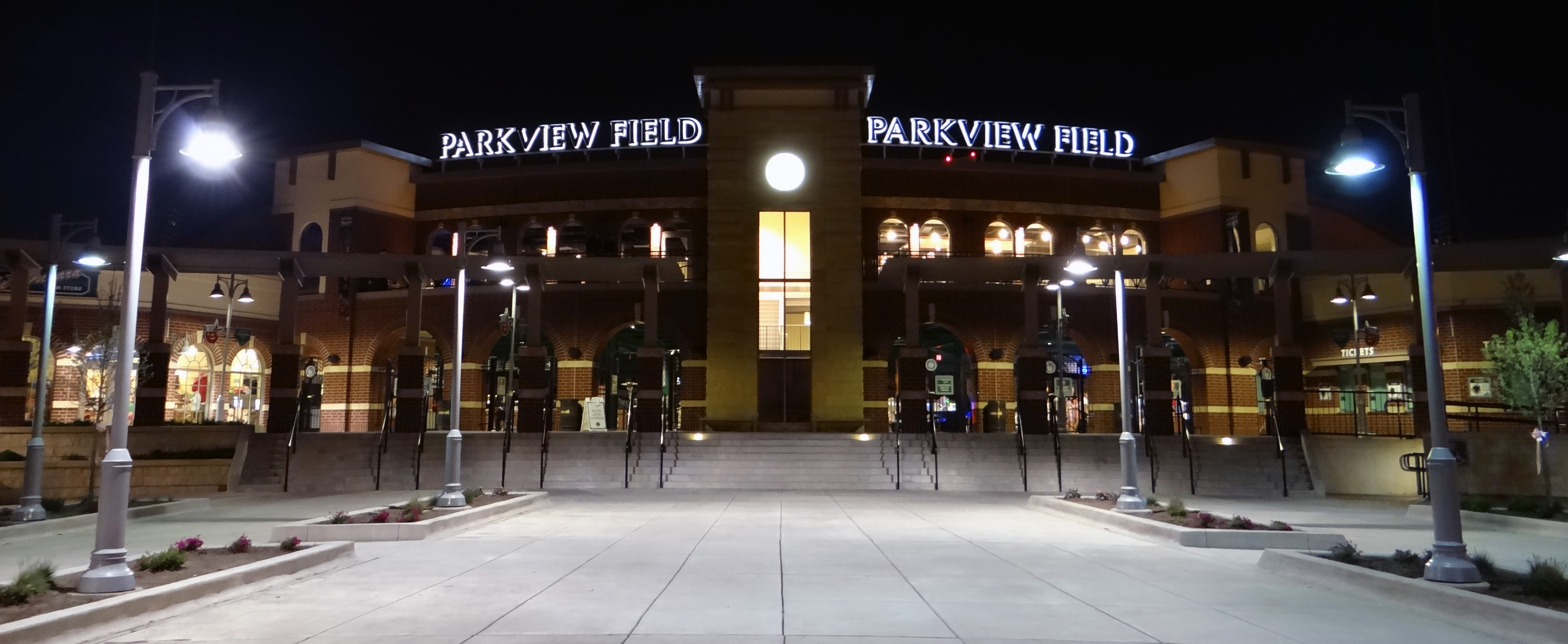
Entrance plaza at night

Parkview Field was built as the new home of the Fort Wayne TinCaps, the Midwest League affiliate of the San Diego Padres, replacing Memorial Stadium. The stadium is also one of the central components to the Harrison Square revitalization project in downtown Fort Wayne. The naming rights were bought by Parkview Health at $3 million over 10 years.

Opening Day was held April 16, 2009 before a sold-out crowd of 8,208. The TinCaps shut out the Dayton Dragons 7–0.

A record attendance of 8,572 made it to Parkview Field on August 6, 2009, not only to watch the TinCaps, but take part in festivities held celebrating Fort Wayne's All-America City designation, pushing the overall season attendance past 300,000. That record was broken on April 5, 2012, when 8,577 attended Opening Day 2012. The record was again broken July 4, 2013 with 8,780 in attendance. The attendance record was broken once again on July 4, 2017, with 9,266 fans attending.

Parkview Field hosted the 2010 Midwest League All-Star Game.

== Features ==
- The ballpark contains 16 luxury suites
- The Appleseed Picnic Pavilion is an old-fashioned ballpark picnic with terraced picnic table seating that wraps around the right field foul pole and extends right down to field level, which accommodates 50–2,500 people
- The Treetops Rooftop Party Area resembles the rooftops at Wrigley Field. Entrees and side items are served throughout the game. Groups as small as 50, up to as large as 250, can enjoy the bird's eye view of all the action.
- Located atop the outfield wall in left field is the Home Run Porch. Complete with food rails in front of each seat, wider, more comfortable padded seats and an overhead trellis, this section accommodates 20-160 guests.
- The park contains lawn seating sections. In 2017, a section of the lawn seating was dedicated to Frederick Waldor, a prominent Fort Wayne native and early investor in the stadium.
- A one-of-a-kind luxury suite equipped with a bar and concessions named the 400 club opened in April 2013. The $800,000 private-investment stands alone as the only such seating area in the minor leagues; located in the "batters eye" (section of a ball park usually blocked off and plain so as not to distract the current batter).

== See also ==
- Sports in Fort Wayne, Indiana
- List of Midwest League stadiums
- List of U.S. baseball stadiums by capacity
