= Johnny Appleseed Park =

Public park in Fort Wayne, Indiana, U.S.

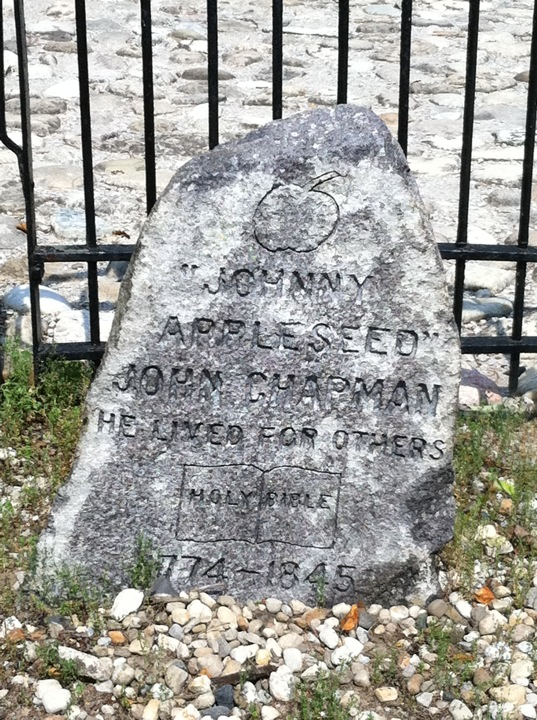
- Interactive map of Johnny Appleseed Park
- Location: Indiana 930, 1500 Harry Baals Drive Fort Wayne, Indiana
- Area: 31.0 acres (12.5 ha)
- Created: 1973 (acquired)
- Operator: Fort Wayne Parks and Recreation
- Status: Open all year
- Johnny Appleseed Memorial Park
- U.S. National Register of Historic Places
- Location within Indiana Location within the United States
- Location: Swanson Blvd. at Parnell Ave. along Old Feeder Canal, Fort Wayne, Indiana
- Coordinates: 41°6′42.5″N 85°07′23.39″W
- Area: 2 acres (0.81 ha)
- Built: 1845
- NRHP reference No.: 73000028
- Added to NRHP: January 17, 1973

Johnny Appleseed Park, including what was formerly known as Archer Park, is a public park in Fort Wayne, Indiana. It is named after the popular-culture nickname of John Chapman, better known as "Johnny Appleseed", a famous American pioneer, who was buried on the site. Chapman's gravesite is accessible to public view through steel gates. The weathered tombstone says, "Johnny Appleseed He lived for others. 1774–1845." It also has a carved apple in bas relief.

It was listed on the National Register of Historic Places in 1973.

The land of the park was donated to Allen County, Indiana, by William T. McKay to serve as a memorial park for the community. It became part of the Fort Wayne Parks and Recreation Department as the city grew and annexed the land. Johnny Appleseed Park serves as the home for Fort Wayne's annual Johnny Appleseed Festival.

The current park, as of 2008, includes a large campground nestled in rolling meadows and woods along the St. Joseph River, Vietnam War Memorial, and at the extreme northwest corner of the park, includes the Allen County War Memorial Coliseum and Exposition Center.

== See also ==
- List of parks in Fort Wayne, Indiana
