= Fort Wayne Rivergreenway =

Shared-use paths in Fort Wayne, Indiana, U.S.

Coordinates: 41°05′03.4″N 85°07′52.6″W

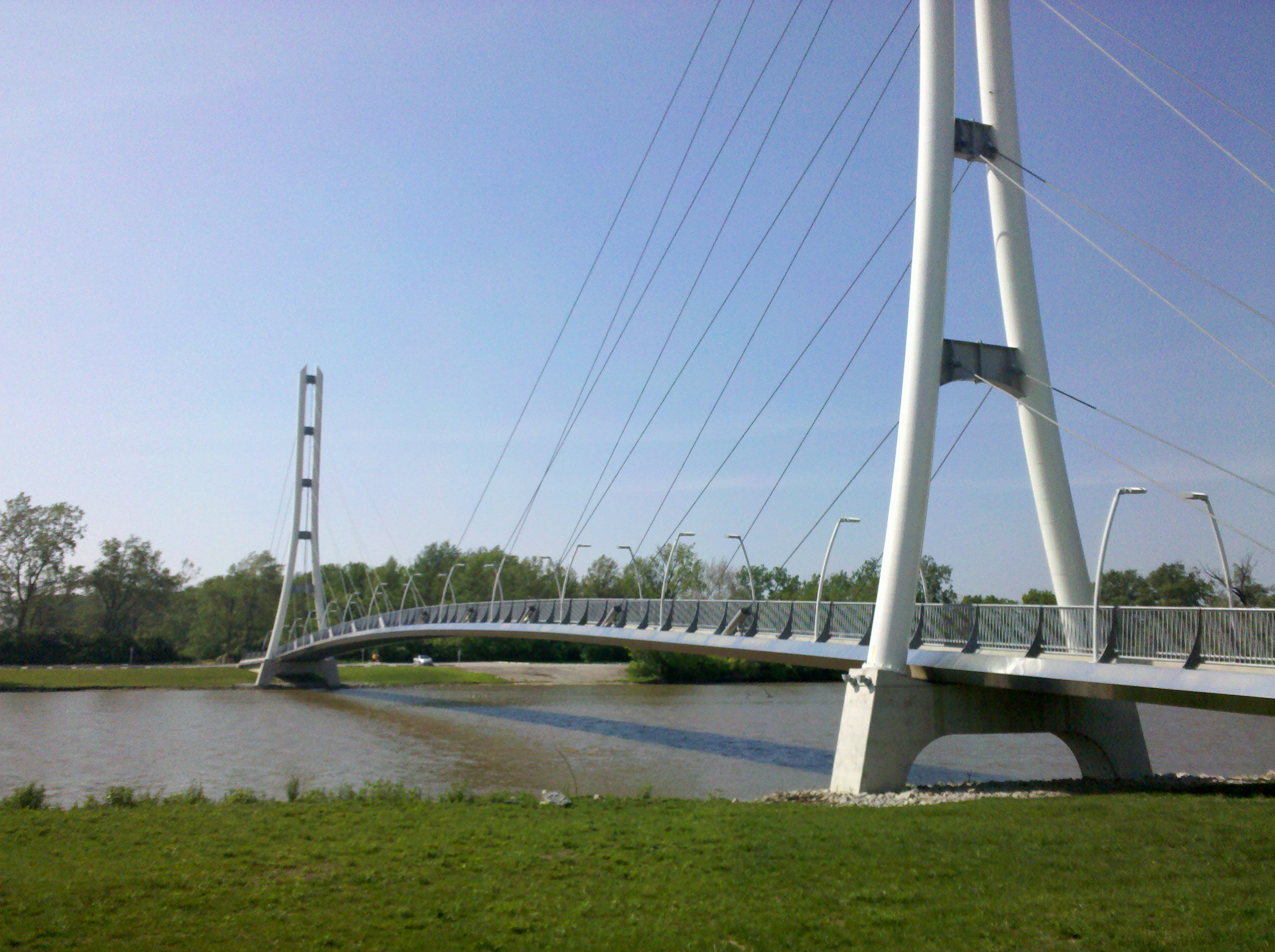
Pedestrian bridge on the St. Joseph River at the Northern end of St Joseph Pathway near IPFW.

The Rivergreenway is the backbone of burgeoning Fort Wayne Trails network in Fort Wayne, Indiana and the surrounding area. The Rivergreenway consists of 26-miles of connected trails through a linear park following alongside or near the City's three rivers: St. Joseph River, St. Marys River, and Maumee River. In 2009, the Rivergreenway was designated as a National Recreation Trail. The trail network also connects to the Wabash & Erie Canal Towpath Trail. Including other trails, like the scenic Pufferbelly Trail which spans Fort Wayne's north side and will eventually connect downtown Fort Wayne to the northern edge of Allen County and beyond, the City of Fort Wayne has over 101 miles of trails. 140 miles exist within Allen County.

The Rivergreenway originates at the confluence of the three rivers meet in downtown Fort Wayne at the water filtration plant. This is considered the zero-mile marker for the St. Joseph, St. Marys and Maumee Pathways.

- The St. Joseph Pathway (5.7 miles) follows the west side of the St. Joseph River from the confluence to Shoaff Park. The trail connects to both the Purdue Fort Wayne and Ivy Tech campuses and offers many scenic areas including views from the Ron Venderly Family Pedestrian Bridge. Users can also access the many businesses along North Anthony Blvd via a connection just south of Coliseum Blvd.
- The St. Joe Blvd. Pathway (1.14 miles) follows the east side of the St. Joseph River from State Blvd to Lafayette Street. This section of trail sits atop the levee system and was built as part of a flood control project.
- The St. Marys Pathway (8.90 miles) runs south from the confluence to Tillman Park in the City's South Side. Along the way, the St. Marys Pathway connects with multiple city parks including the Historic Old Fort, Promenade, Lawton, Headwaters, Bloomingdale, Swinney, Foster and Tillman Parks. This pathway is also the main trail connection to downtown Fort Wayne. At its terminus, the St.Marys Pathway connects to the 6-Mile Creek trail which offers pedestrian access to the Southtown Center Plaza. Trail users can also use the St.Marys Pathway to extend north at Tillman Park via the Hanna Street Trail.
- The Maumee Pathway (8.75 miles) cuts east on the north side of the Maumee River winding its way to the City of New Haven's Moser Park where it terminates. This section of trail is the most remote section because it is located behind the City's treatment ponds. In 2009, the City built a trail spur to Coliseum Blvd in order to provide emergency access and another point of entry for trail users. A connection to Maplecrest Road also provides pedestrian access to the City's Northeast side, including the businesses commonly known as "Georgetown".
- The Yarnell Trail (1.11 miles) originates in West Swinney Park at the St. Marys Pathway just southeast of the swimming pool and runs west through West Swinney Park, along West Jefferson Boulevard to Rockhill Park.
- The 6-Mile Creek Trail (.60 miles) begins at Tillman Park, where the St. Marys Pathway ends, and it runs south along Hanna St. to a mid-block crossing, taking trail users across a field to the back side of Southtown Centre. The trail continues north along South Anthony Boulevard and then extends east along Tillman Road, ending at Fellowship Missionary Church.
