= Harrison Square =

Urban redevelopment project in Indiana, U.S.

Coordinates: 41°4′28″N 85°8′31.5″W

Harrison Square is a mixed-use downtown revitalization project in Fort Wayne, Indiana. The project includes a ballpark that is primarily used for baseball, home field to the Fort Wayne TinCaps minor league baseball team. Also included are new retail, office, and apartments, a Courtyard by Marriott to serve Grand Wayne Convention Center and Embassy Theatre patrons, and an adjoining park with amphitheater and fountain.

== Parkview Field ==
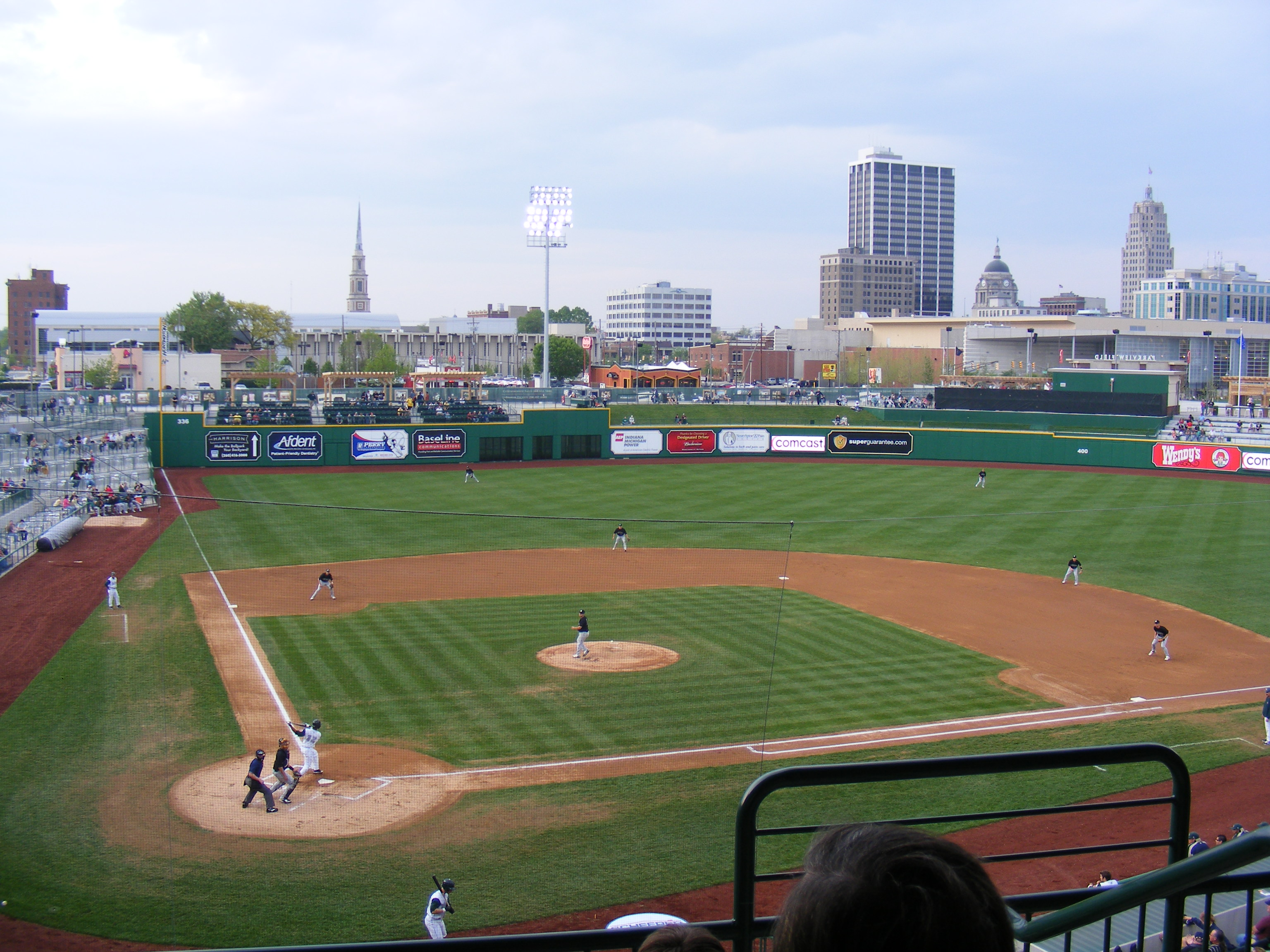
Parkview Field in 2009.

The ballpark at Harrison Square is valued at $30 million with fixed seating of 6,000 and a capacity of 8,000 to 9,000 with the inclusion of non-fixed seats such as berm seating (estimated at 1,000) and bar and table top seating, as well as other non-fixed seating arrangements.

Populous (formerly HOK Sport Venue Event) was selected to design the ballpark, which features a retro design that takes cues from the architecture of familiar Downtown Fort Wayne landmarks. The ballpark is located at the corner of West Brackenridge Street and Ewing Street.

On September 11, 2008, Parkview Health System announced a 10-year naming rights deal that would dub the ballpark Parkview Field and have the sponsor provide health and food services there.

== Residential ==
The Harrison apartments are valued at $14.5 million and number 44 residential units on the third and fourth floors, with south facing units looking onto the ballpark. There were originally three phases of residential included in the Harrison Square plan. The second and third phases are contracted to be completed after the prior phase has reached capacity.

== Retail and office ==
The retail portion of the project is valued at $6 million and covers 24,000 square feet (2,200 m^{2}) at the ground level of The Harrison along West Jefferson Boulevard. Retail tenants also enjoy south facing views into the ballpark. Currently, a Three Rivers Federal Credit Union and Indianapolis-based Los Patios Mexican Restaurant occupy space on the lower level. Carson Boxberger LLP occupies the entire second floor of The Harrison.

== Hotel ==
A 250-room Courtyard by Marriott is situated at the corner of West Jefferson Boulevard and South Harrison Street. A skywalk was erected over Harrison Street in 2010 between the third floor of the hotel and the Embassy Theatre. The hotel also includes a Champions Sports Bar and Restaurant. In 2019 a new six-story Hampton Inn was added between The Harrison and the Courtyard by Marriott. The hotel has two restaurants, Burger Bar on the first floor and Connor's Rooftop on the top of the hotel.

== Parking garage ==
A $10 million parking garage, located at the corner of South Harrison Street and West Douglas Avenue, houses 900 parking spaces, 300 spaces dedicated to the Courtyard by Marriott.

On Thursday, December 18, 2008, construction workers punctured a natural gas line with dirt-moving equipment, causing an isolated fire that burned for over an hour. No injuries and only minimal damage to the parking garage were reported.
