= Allen County War Memorial Coliseum =

Multi-purpose arena in Fort Wayne, Indiana, U.S.

- Memorial Coliseum, Fort Wayne Coliseum, The Jungle

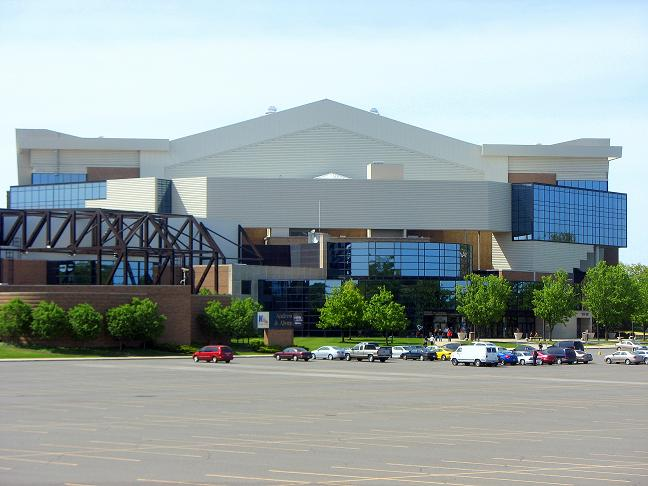

- Location within Indiana Location within the United States
- Former names: War Memorial Coliseum
- Address: 4000 Parnell Avenue
- Location: Fort Wayne, Indiana, U.S.
- Coordinates: 41°6′56″N 85°7′28″W
- Owner: Allen County
- Operator: Allen County
- Capacity: Ice hockey/concerts: 10,480; Basketball: 13,000

Construction
- Groundbreaking: January 24, 1950
- Opened: September 28, 1952
- Cost: 1952: $2,647,390 ($32.1 million in 2025 dollars); 1989: $26 million 2002: $35 million 2013: $3.96 million
- Architect: A.M. Strauss
- General contractor: Hagerman Construction Corp.

Tenants
- Fort Wayne Komets (ECHL) (1952–present); Fort Wayne Pistons (NBA) (1952–1957); Fort Wayne Flames (AISA) (1986–1989); Indiana Kick (AISA) (1989–1990); Fort Wayne Fury (CBA) (1991–2001); Fort Wayne Mastodons (NCAA) (2001–2013, occasional games since); Fort Wayne Freedom (NIFL/UIF/CIFL) (2003–2006, 2008–2009); Fort Wayne Fusion (AF2) (2007); Fort Wayne Mad Ants (NBAGL) (2007–2023); Fort Wayne Firehawks (CIFL) (2010)

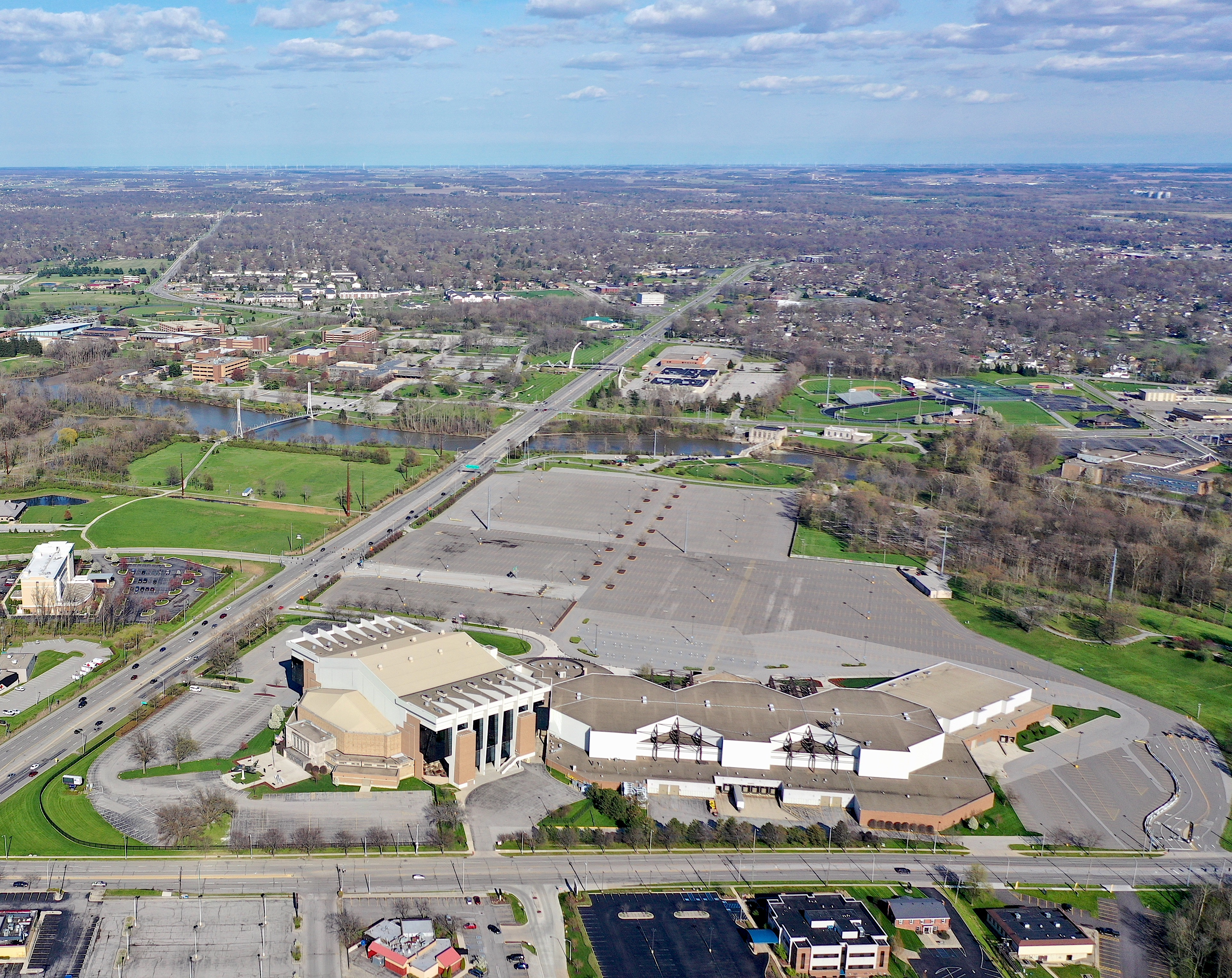
The Allen County War Memorial Coliseum in 2020

Allen County War Memorial Coliseum is a 13,000-seat multi-purpose arena located in Fort Wayne, Indiana, United States, near present-day Johnny Appleseed Park. It opened in 1952 with a construction cost of nearly $3 million. The Allen County War Memorial Coliseum was originally designed to seat 8,103 for hockey or 10,240 for basketball. Opened in 1989, the Coliseum's $26 million Exposition Center contains 108,000 square feet (10,000 m^{2}) devoted to hosting substantial trade shows and other events with seating for 7,500.

In 2002, an extensive $35 million renovation and expansion raised the Allen County War Memorial Coliseum's roof by 41 feet (12 m), thus increasing the arena's seating capacity to 10,500 for hockey or music concerts and 13,000 for basketball. The original structure was designed by A.M. Strauss Architects.

== Sports ==
The Allen County War Memorial Coliseum is the current home of the:

- Fort Wayne Komets of the ECHL ice hockey league
- Fort Wayne Derby Girls of the Women's Flat Track Derby Association Division 2

=== Major events ===
War Memorial Coliseum was known foremost as the home of the NBA's Fort Wayne Pistons for five seasons (1952–57) as well as the 1953 NBA All-Star Game and 1955 and 1956 NBA Finals. After the Pistons moved to Detroit in 1957, the facility continued to host at least one of their games every season from the 1958–59 to 1966–67 campaigns. Other pro basketball events there were the 1994 CBA All-Star Game and the 2014 and 2015 NBA D-League Finals.

Memorial Coliseum was the site of several NCAA events, including the 2000, 2001 and 2002 Mid-Continent Conference men's basketball tournaments and the 1988, 1994 and 2000 NCAA Division I Final Four men's volleyball championships. More recently, the University of Notre Dame hosted the 2010 NCAA Division I men's ice hockey tournament Midwest Regional at Memorial Coliseum. The 2022 and 2023 NCAA Division III men's basketball championship also were held there.

The arena has hosted college wrestling tournaments as well as the sectional, regional and semistate championships of the IHSAA boys' basketball tournament during the one-class era.

The Coliseum was selected in April 2017 as one of the sites for the "Sweet 16" round of the 2020 NCAA Division I Women's Basketball Championship and the "Final Four" of the NCAA Division III men's basketball championship in 2019, 2020, 2021 and 2022.

The Coliseum has hosted several live events by World Wrestling Entertainment, including Saturday Night's Main Event on May 23, 2026. It was the first WWE televised event in Fort Wayne since 2014.

== Related facilities ==
The Allen County War Memorial Coliseum complex includes the Allen County War Memorial Coliseum Exposition Center and Holiday Inn, managed in cooperation with Purdue–Fort Wayne.

=== Exposition Center ===
Within the same complex as the arena, the Allen County War Memorial Coliseum Exposition Center contains 108,000 square feet (10,000 m^{2}) devoted to hosting substantial trade shows, banquets, graduation ceremonies, concerts, truck and tractor pulls, and wrestling matches, with the capability of seating 7,500 guests. When no events are scheduled for the arena, the Exposition Center's capacity can extend to a total of 175,000 square feet (16,300 m^{2}). The Exposition Center was added in the $26 million renovation and expansion of the complex, completed in 1989.

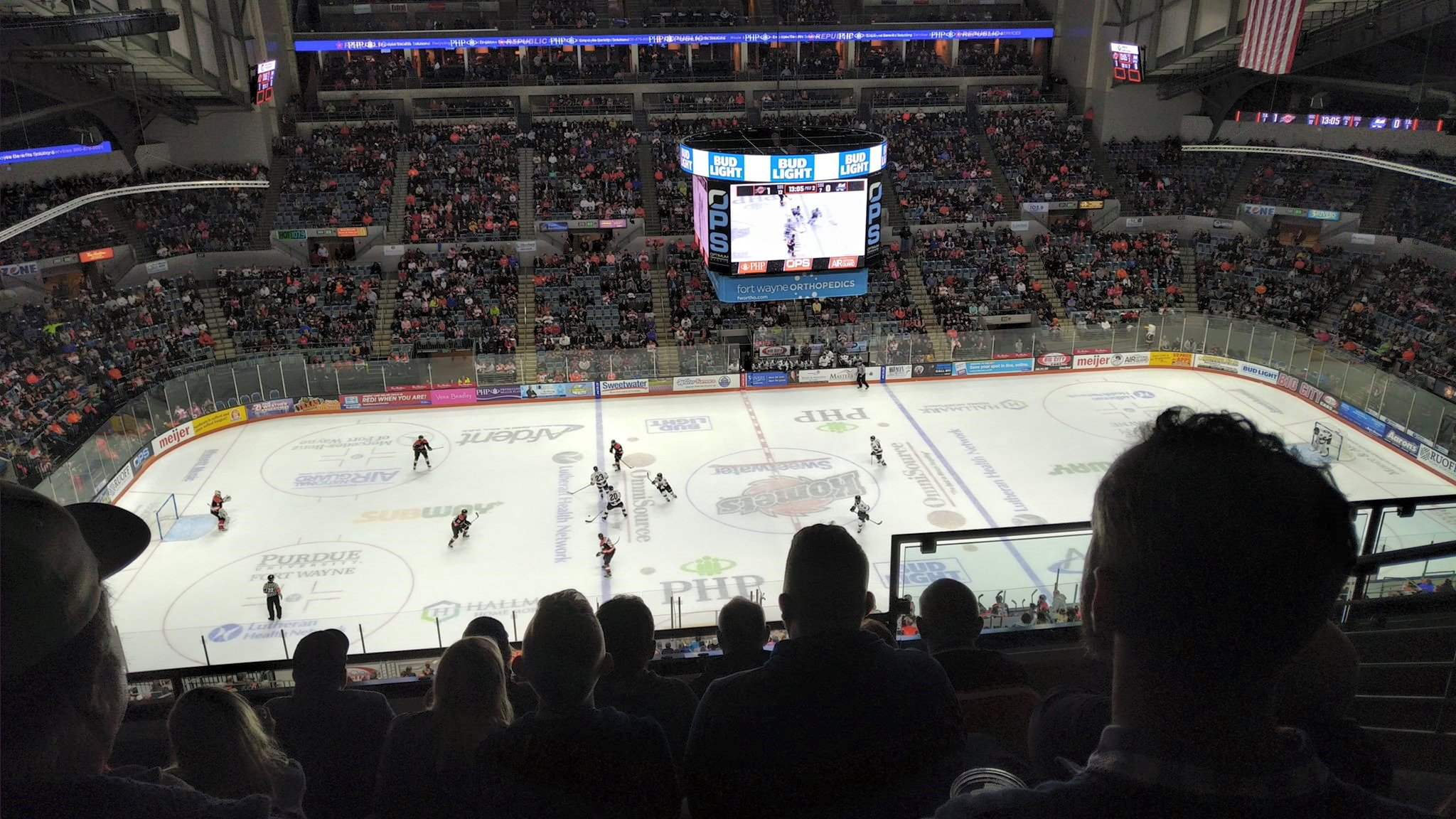
The arena during a Komets hockey game

=== Grounds ===
The grounds immediately surrounding the Allen County War Memorial Coliseum display the anchor from World War II's USS Indiana battleship. South and east of the central complex is an expansive parking lot, containing 4,500 available parking spaces. To the south and west along the St. Joseph River, lies Johnny Appleseed Park, containing the gravesite of American folklore figure John Chapman. To the north and northeast is the Purdue–FW campus, especially the portion of the Purdue–FW campus located on the western bank of the St. Joseph, on which a 151-room Holiday Inn is located.

=== Recent construction ===
In 2013, a $3.96 million renovation and expansion of the 200 Level was completed. The project included upgraded restrooms with LED lighting, no-touch sinks, no-touch toilets, and no-touch urinals, and the addition of two food courts with three new vendors. Other restrooms throughout the Memorial Coliseum were upgraded in 2014. The ribbon cutting ceremony was October 11, 2013. In 2018, a new four-sided LED scoreboard was installed by Daktronics, Inc. The screens from the previous scoreboard were placed in each corner of the arena.

== Other events ==
=== Midget car racing ===
The Coliseum Arena hosted the first ever United States Auto Club race in 1956, a 100-lap midget car race at a 1/10-mile oval. The event continued until 1989, usually with two separate events in early and late January.

Since 1998, the Coliseum Exposition Center has hosted the Rumble in Fort Wayne, an annual midget car race. Featuring a 1/6-mile flat oval, it takes place at the end of the year, and after most major racing series seasons have ended. It has allowed drivers from major racing series to participate: Dave Darland, Tracy Hines, J. J. Yeley, Bryan Clauson Sammy Swindell; with NASCAR, USAC and IndyCar champion Tony Stewart having the most feature wins at 9.

=== Politics ===
On May 1, 2016, Donald Trump held a campaign rally ahead of the Indiana Primary election at the Allen County War Memorial Coliseum. Over 12,500 were in attendance.

On November 5, 2018, then President Donald Trump returned to the Allen County War Memorial Coliseum on the eve of the Midterm Election, holding a rally for his administration and to aid Mike Braun in his efforts to win a seat in the United States Senate. Coliseum officials estimated 20,000 Trump supporters attended the rally.

== See also ==
- Sports in Fort Wayne, Indiana
- List of convention centers in the United States
- List of indoor arenas in the United States
- List of music venues in the United States

Events and tenants
Preceded by North Side High School Gym	Home of the Fort Wayne Pistons; 1952–1957	Succeeded by Olympia Coliseum
Preceded by Boston Garden	Host of the NBA All-Star Game; 1953	Succeeded by Madison Square Garden
