= Home Reserve =

American furniture manufacturing company

Home Reserve, LLC.
- Type: Private
- Industry: Furnishings
- Founded: 2000
- Headquarters: 3015 Cannongate Drive, Fort Wayne, IN 46808, USA
- Products: RTA Upholstered Furniture
- Website: www.homereserve.com

Home Reserve, LLC, is a furniture manufacturing company headquartered in Fort Wayne, Indiana, US. The company manufactures ready-to-assemble furniture.

The company adapted an e-commerce model in 2000. Previously, the company founders had been designing seating products for public lobbies in the healthcare and educational markets. In 2004, The Cincinnati Post reported that “the company has constructed other furniture for four generation and some designs were used on the sets of TV shows “ER” and “Touched by an Angel”.
